= Lev Vladimir Goriansky =

Naval officer, architect, and artist

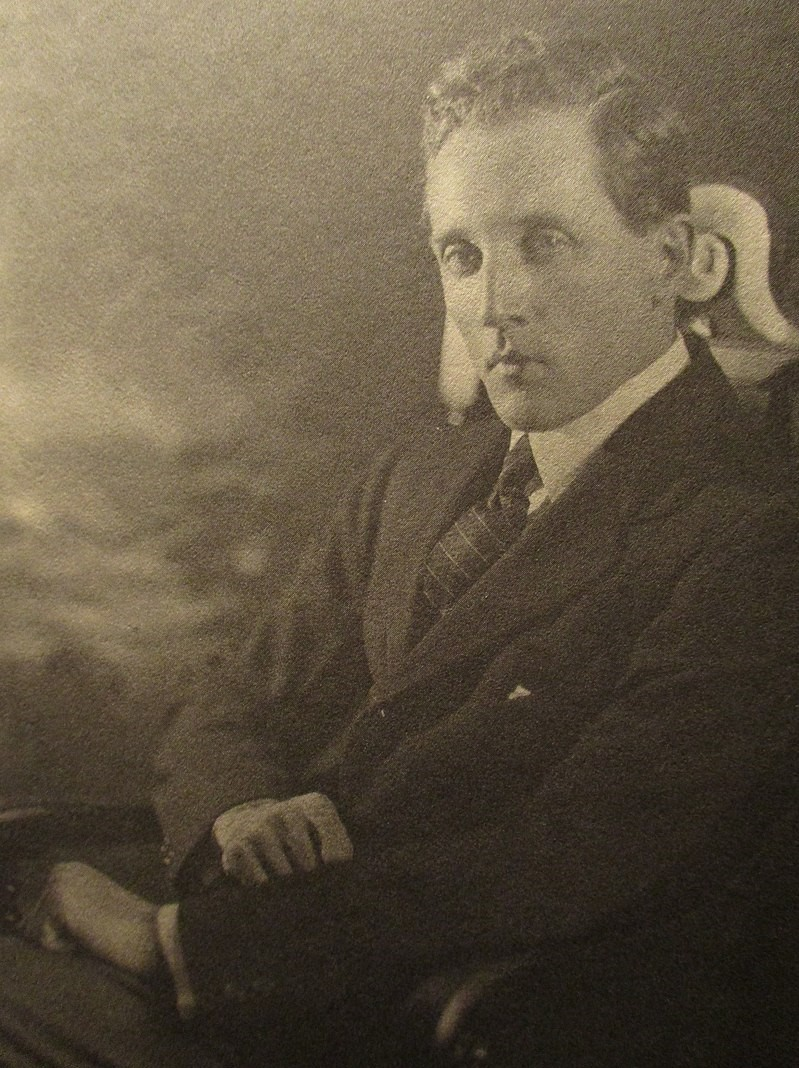
- Goriansky c. 1923
- Born: 1894; Kharkov, Russian Empire
- Died: 1967 (aged 72–73); Andover, Massachusetts, U.S.
- Resting place: Forest Hill Cemetery, Northeast Harbor, Maine
- Education: Imperial Academy of Arts; Massachusetts Institute of Technology, B.S., M.Arch.; Harvard University, M.A. Fine Arts
- Occupations: Lieutenant Russian Imperial Navy, Architect, Artist
- Employer(s): Cram & Ferguson, Boston; Cross & Cross, New York
- Spouse: Carola Eliot Goriansky 1896-1989

Lev Vladimir Goriansky (1894–1967) also known as LVG, was a Russian naval officer. He later emigrated to the United States and became an architect and artist.

== Early life ==
Goriansky was born in Kharkov, Ukraine, the second son of six children (Uri, Lev, Nicholas, Olga, Alexis, Benjamin) to Vladimir Goriansky and Anna Savitch. His father was an engineer and later appointed by Emperor Nicholas II as President of the Chamber of Control in Poltava. His mother's family was titled and owned a large country estate in Ukraine.

From an early age Goriansky was gifted and excelled in drawing. In 1910 at the age of sixteen he entered a competition to study for two years at the Imperial Academy of Arts in St. Petersburg and was accepted. While studying art at school he lived with his uncle, Dr. Goriansky who had an apartment in the Winter Palace adjacent to the Hermitage Museum, allowing the young student time to investigate and appreciate many of the great works of the world.

== Naval officer ==
In 1914 at the beginning of World War I, Goriansky entered the Russian Naval Academy to train as an officer. Upon graduation he was assigned to the Russian Cruiser Rurik (1906) of the Baltic Fleet. During the upheavals of the 1917 Russian Revolution, and after a murderous mutiny aboard his ship, Goriansky made his way towards Poland where he was stopped and placed into a detention camp. He would later manage to escape and return home to Kharkov before it fell in the revolution. He bid his parents farewell, and joined the loyal Black Sea Fleet in Sebastopol, where he would serve aboard the cruiser Kagoul as a Lieutenant under Admiral Osteletsky. During his travels in the Navy he made a stop in Constantinople where he visited Haghia Sophia, which greatly inspired him and he would later write about. While stationed in Bizerte, he took the opportunity to board an American freighter and work his way to America, which would become his new home.

== Architect ==
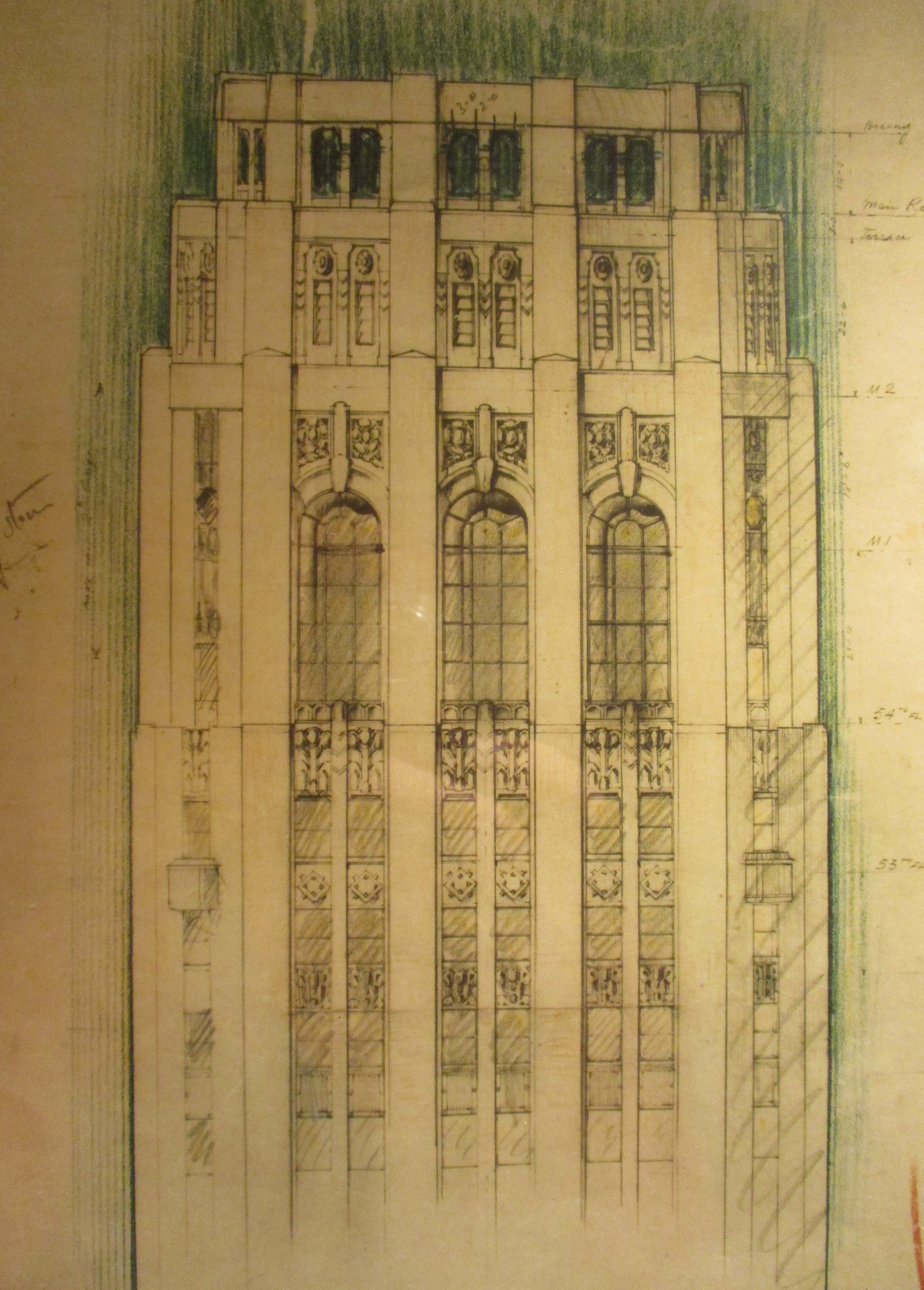
Cross & Cross approved architectural drawing by Lev Vladimir Goriansky of City Bank Farmers Trust Building. Circa 1929, Goriansky Family Collection

Nicholas Roerich gave Goriansky his first job in America by helping remodel an old brownstone house which would become the Nicholas Roerich Museum. Roerich would later recommend Goriansky enrolling in the Massachusetts Institute of Technology, which he did in January 1922 and received his B.S. in Architecture in January, 1924. He found two good friends while studying there in Prof. William Emerson and Prof. Jacques Carlu, a French professor of art and design. While working part-time at Cram & Ferguson, Goriansky continued studying at MIT for his master's degree in architecture, which he received in 1925.

With Cram & Ferguson he worked on the designs for the walls of the Baptistry of Cathedral of St. John the Divine. By 1929 he was working with Cross & Cross in New York City. Notable projects of that period include working on the City Bank-Farmers Trust skyscraper in Manhattan, New York (20 Exchange Place) and being instrumental in the exterior design of the upper half of the building and the concept of the flat top, among the first in NYC. At the time of completion it was the tallest stone clad building in the world.

In 1955, Goriansky designed a family summer home at Pebble Beach, on Peabody Drive, in Northeast Harbor, Maine. Notable features of the home are the "Brick Jali Wall" inspired by Middle Eastern / Islamic architecture, and the Steel Porcelain Enameled Fireplace Hood.

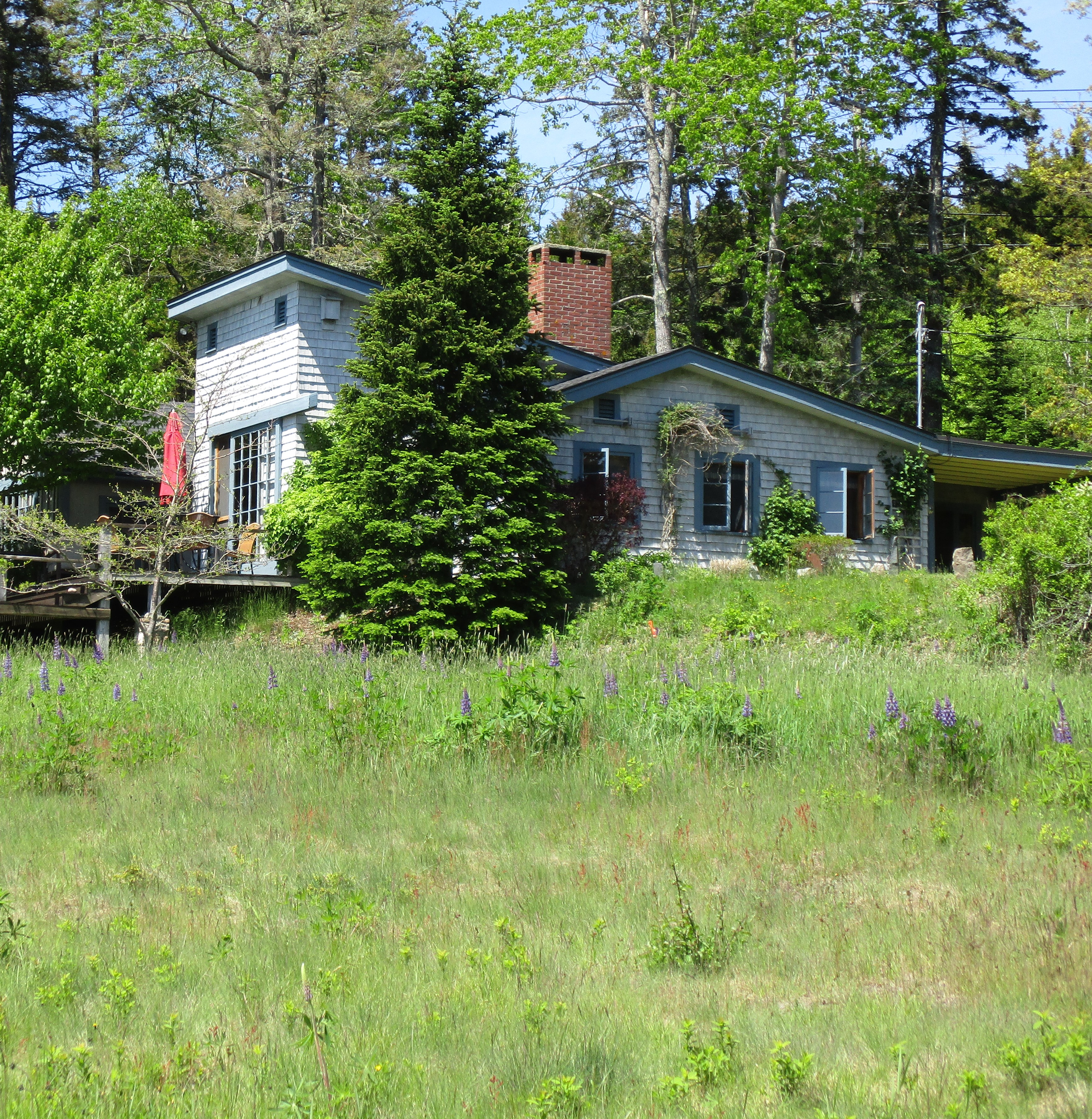
Pebble Beach house, 2018

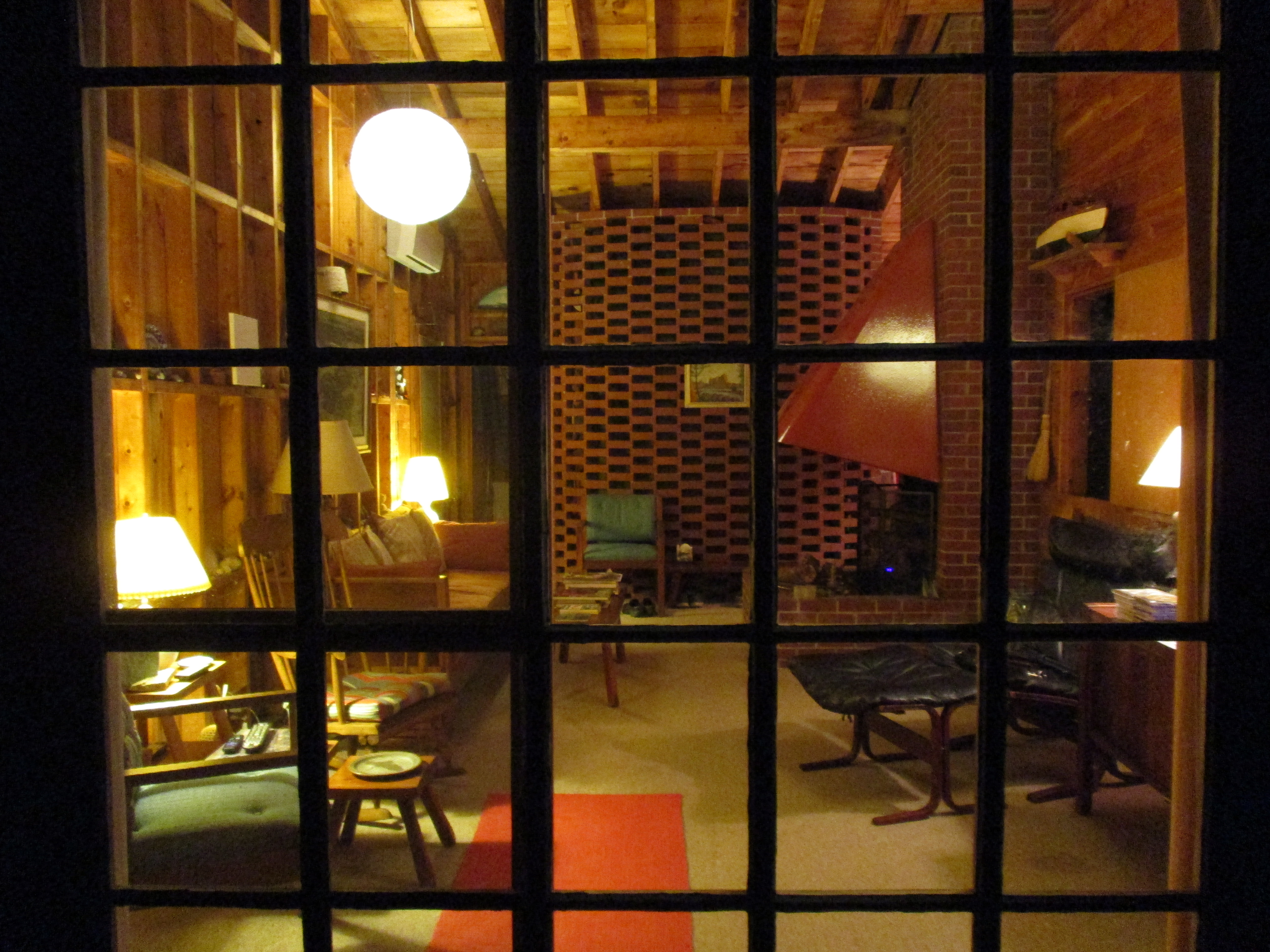
Living Room 2018

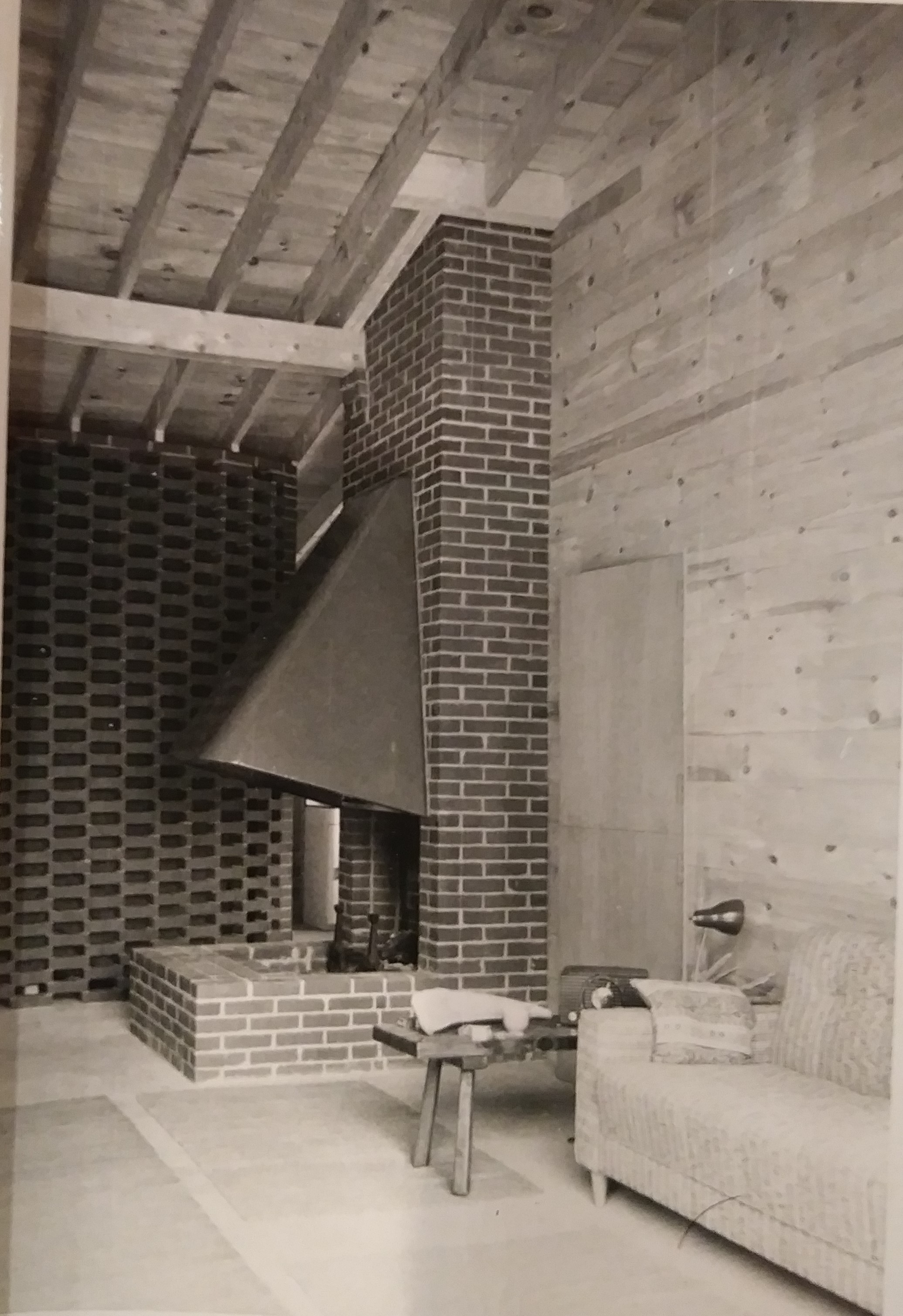
Living Room 1956

== Artist ==
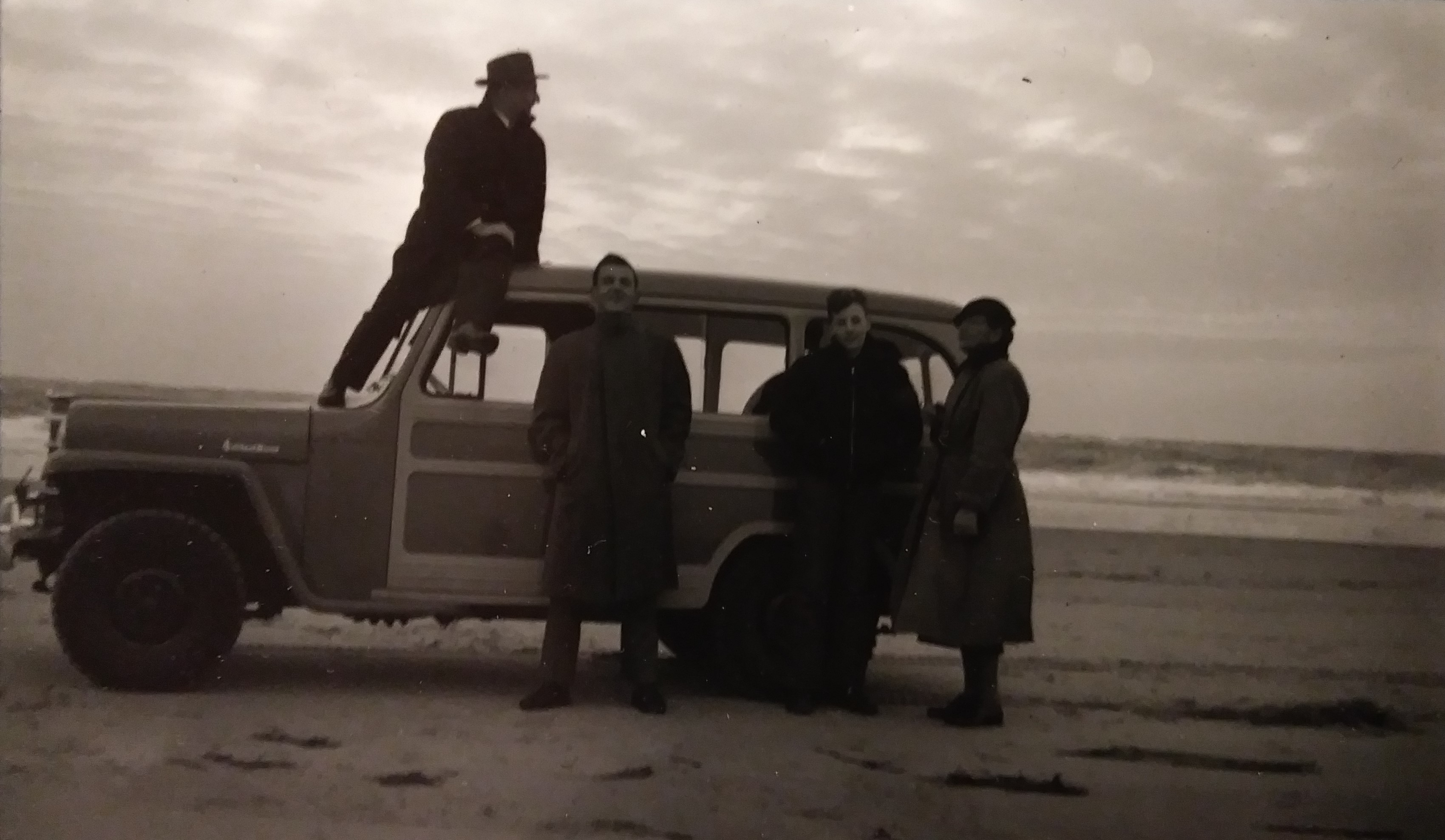
The Artist on car with his family, Crane Beach, Ipswich MA, 1949, Goriansky Family Collection

With the onset of the Great Depression, Goriansky's professional career as an architect would come to a close. He would spend 1932-1934 studying at Harvard and receiving his master's in Fine Arts, and then traveling, studying, and sketching in Europe between 1934 and 1936. Between 1936 and 1956 he worked as a professional artist drawing and painting a diverse body of work, numbering over several hundred pieces. Ranging from spiritual and biblical themes, to still lifes, landscapes, figure studies and architectural renderings, signing his works LVG / BTS in a red square.

During this period he published:

- 1938 - The Fine Arts: Some Thoughts on Higher Education: A Resume of Personal Experience and Investigations, Search for Truth. La Merite Francaise, Paris (prize).
- 1941 - Haghia Sophia: Research in the Line of Dynamic Philosophy as to the Nature of the Great Enigma. (Andhra Research University Pamphlets, Vizianagaram City, South India).

== Works ==
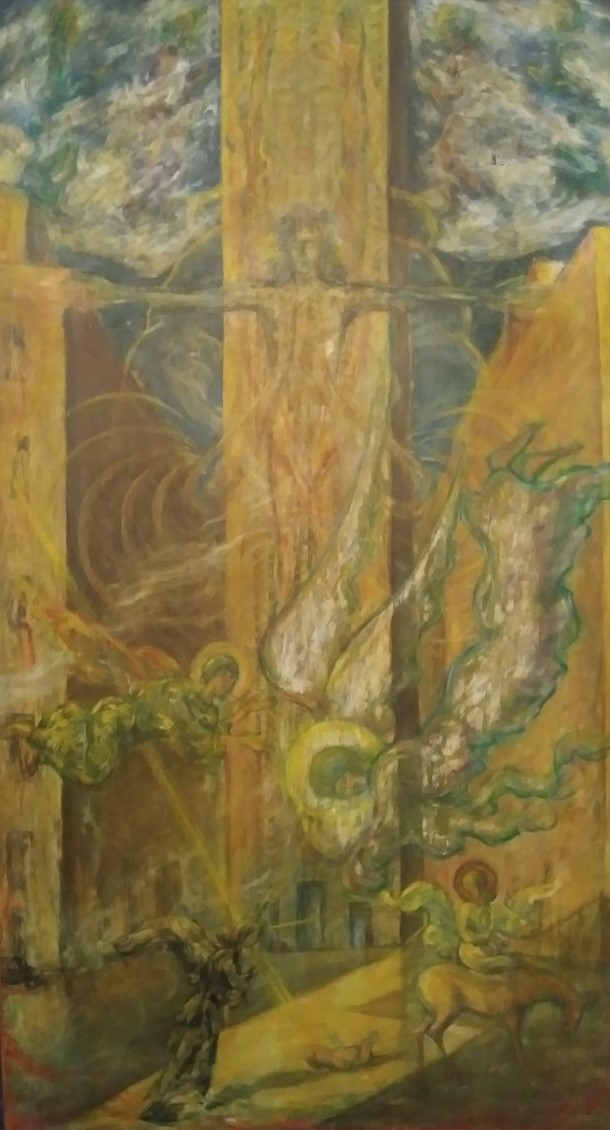
Birth of a New Humanity, by LVG, oil on panel, 1940s, 47"x 83", Goriansky Family Collection

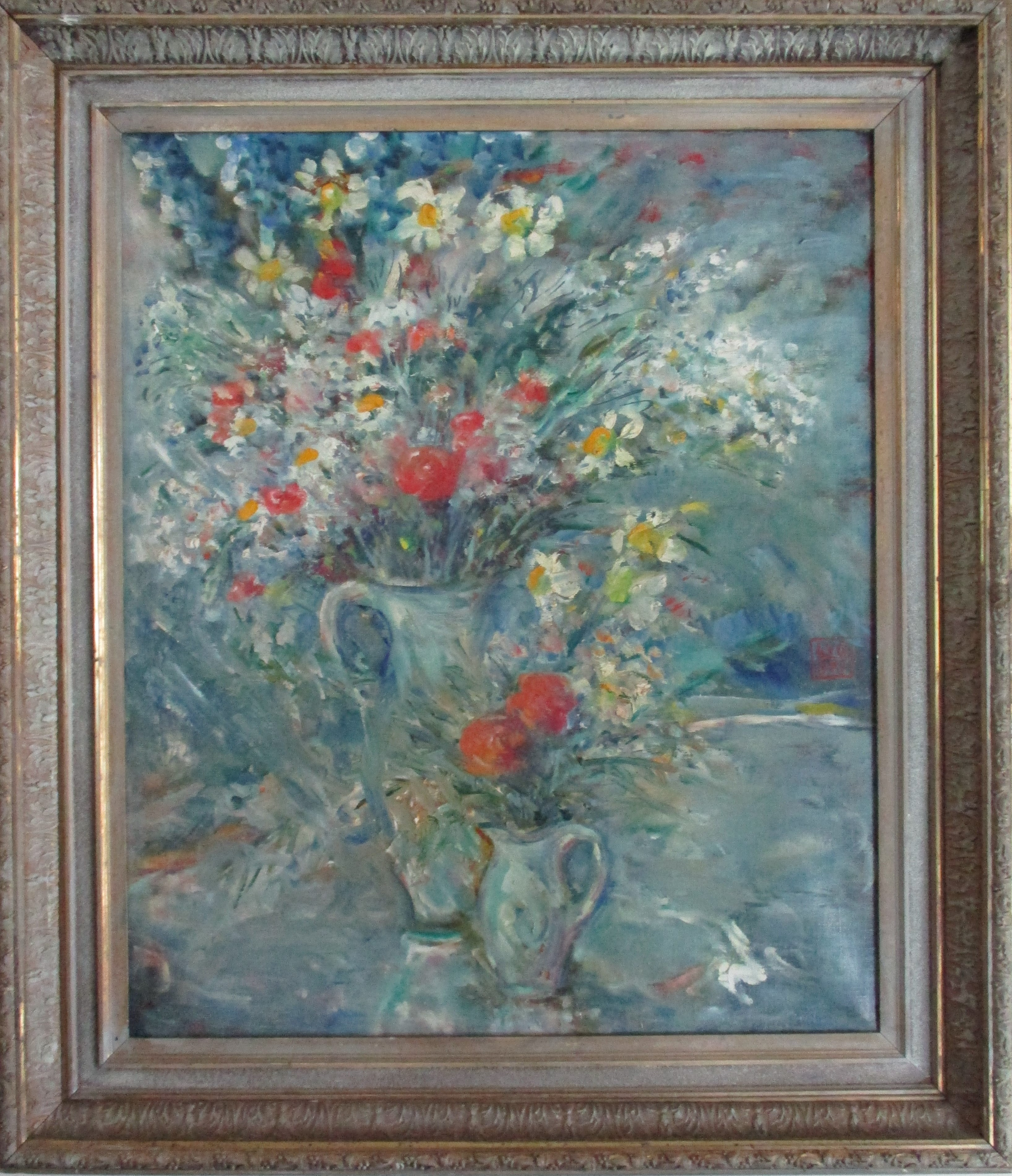
Bouquet # 7, by LVG, oil on canvas, 1940s, 24" x 30", courtesy Jan L. Goriansky

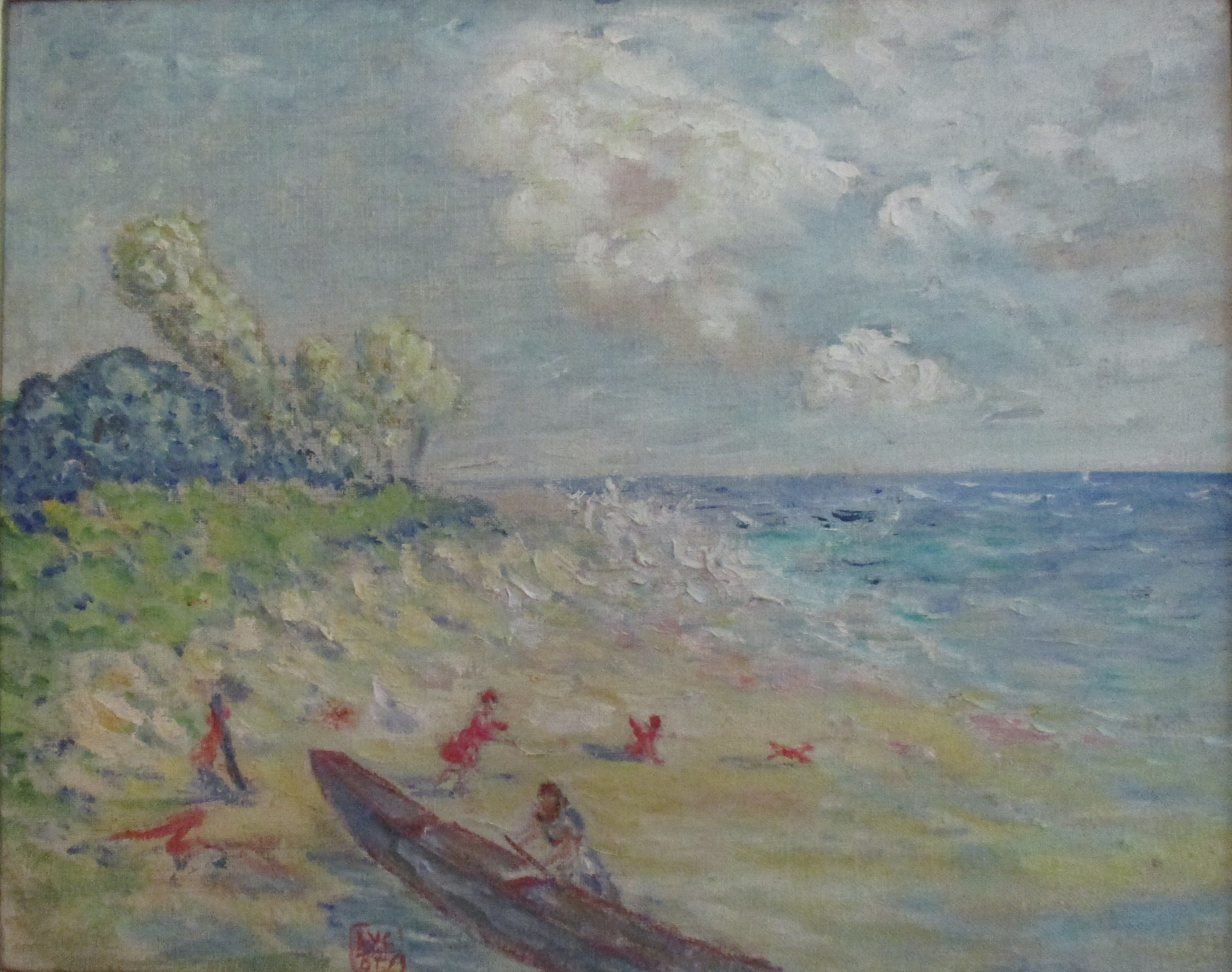
Seaside, by LVG, oil on canvas, 1940s, Goriansky Family Collection

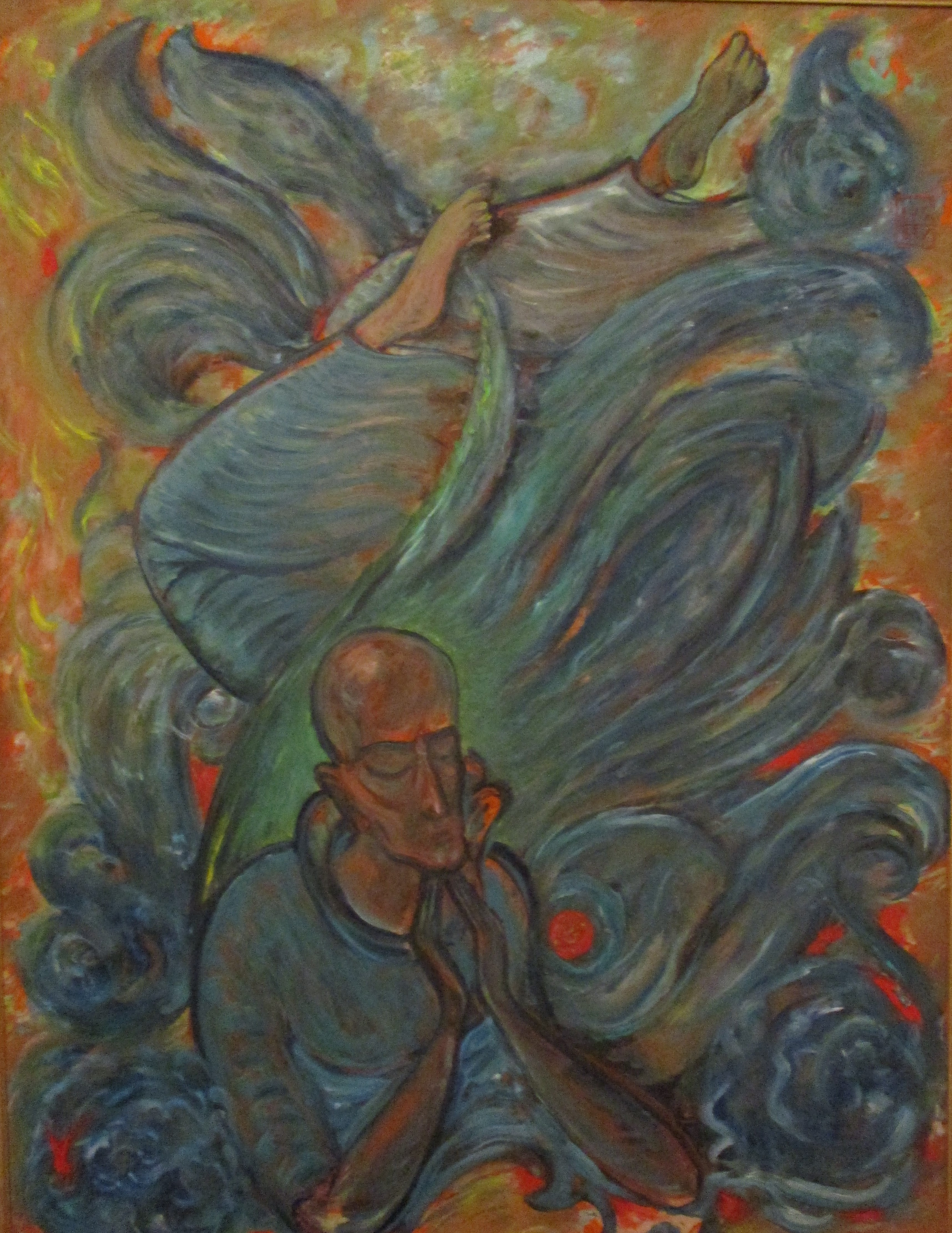
The Fallen Angel, by LVG, oil on paper, 1944, 33" x 43", Goriansky Family Collection

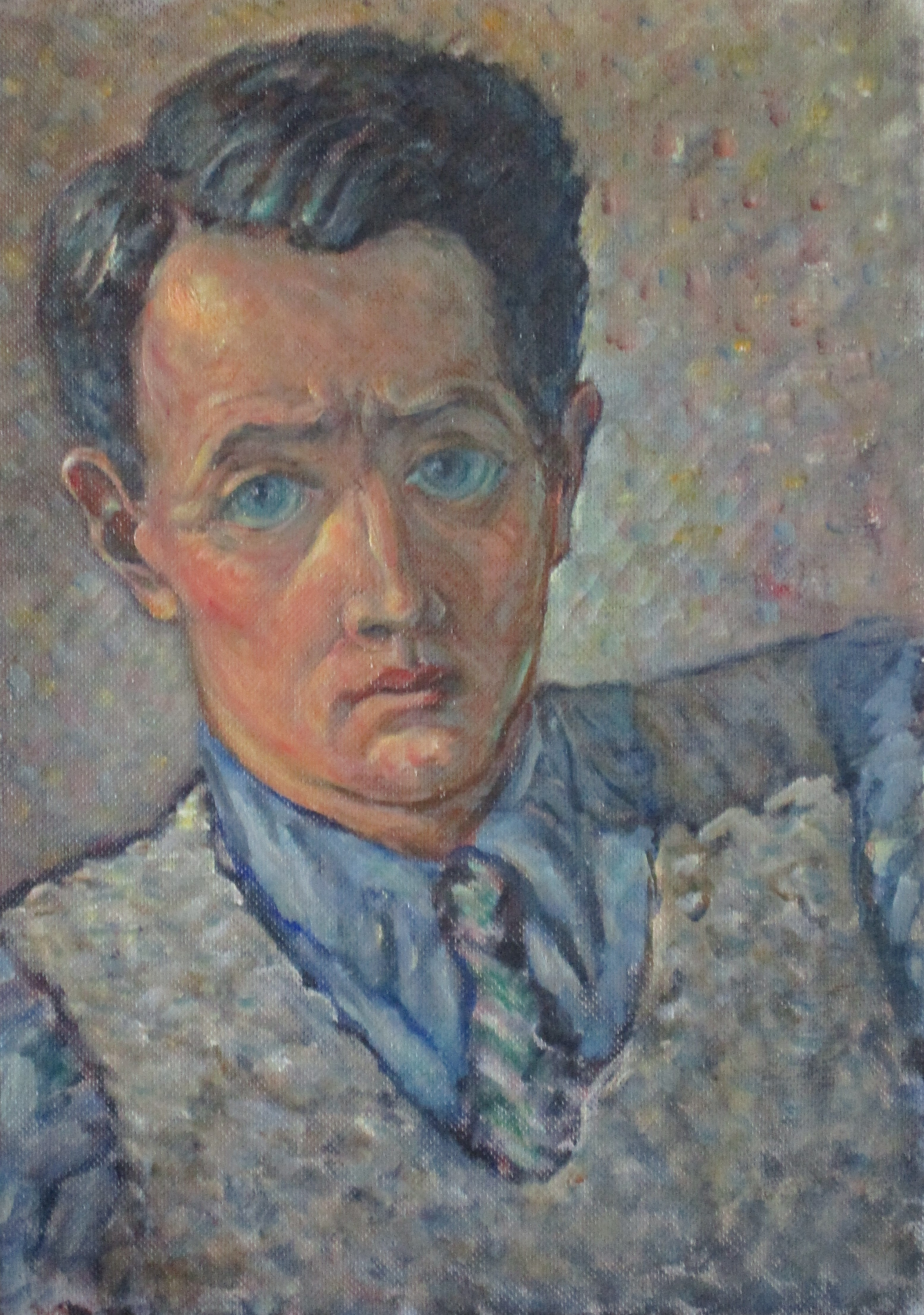
LVG Self Portrait, by LVG, oil on panel, 1935, 15" x 21", Goriansky Family Collection

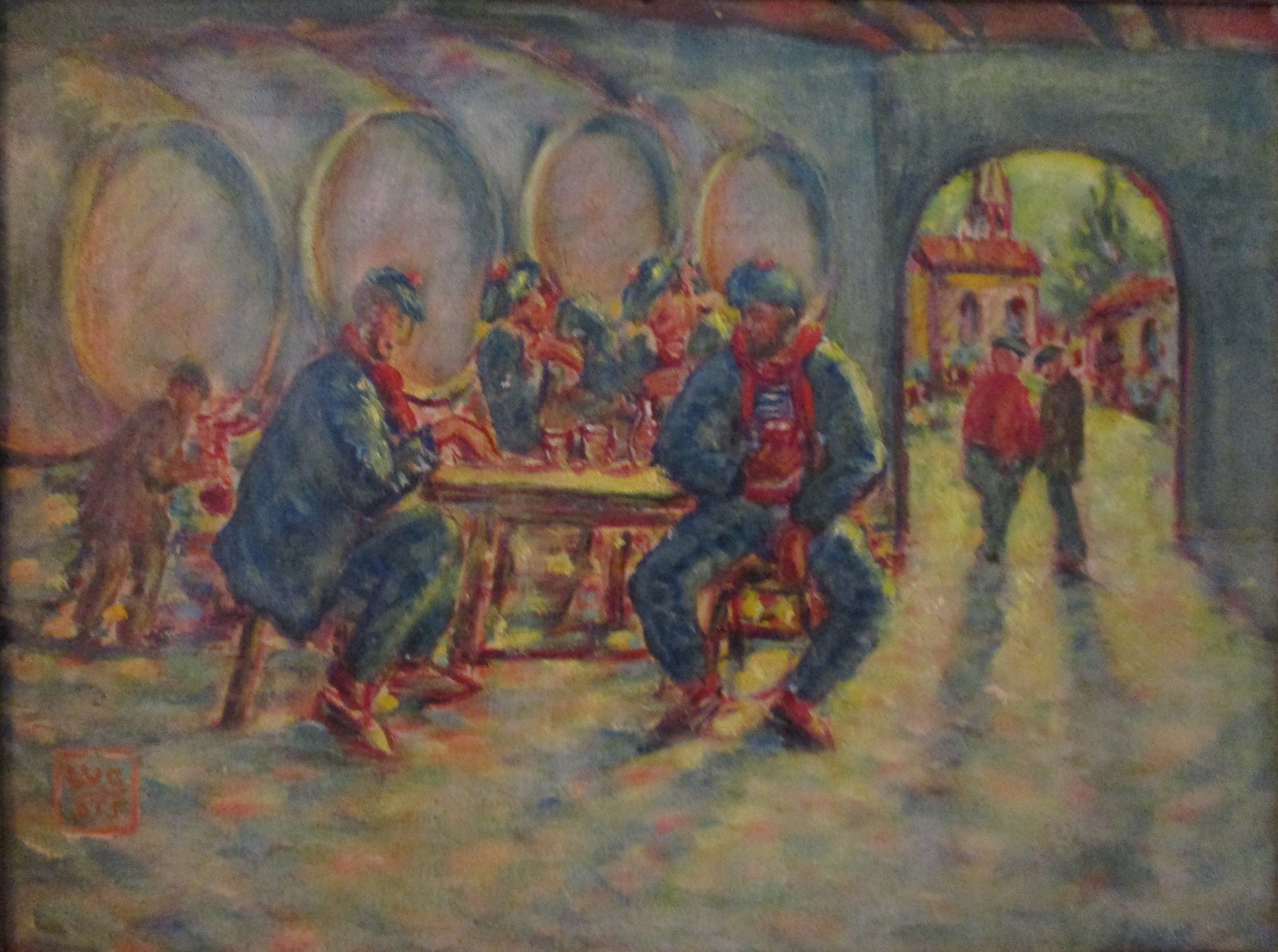
Card Game, by LVG, oil on canvas, 1940s, Goriansky Family Collection

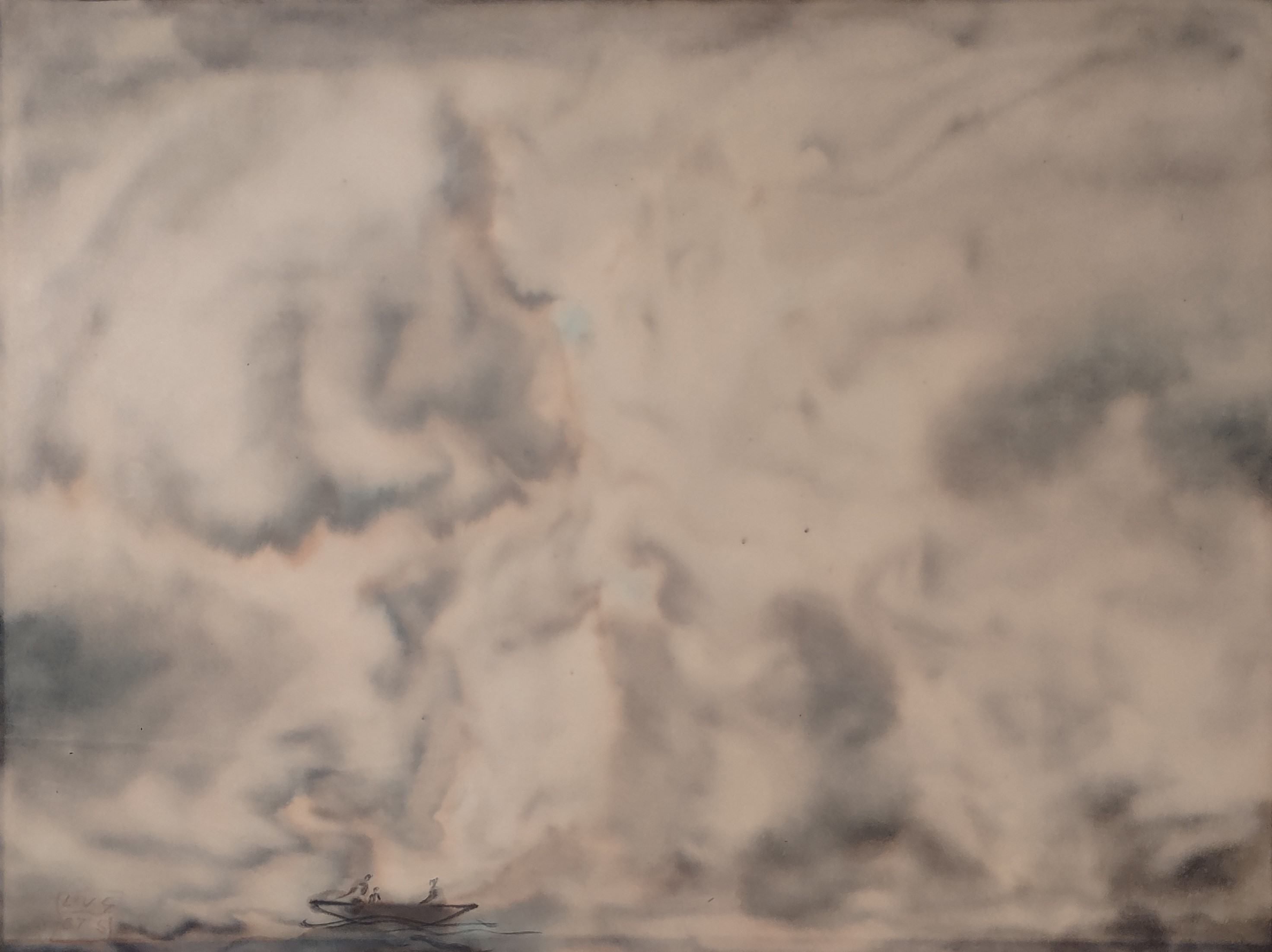
Tranquility within the Fog, by LVG, watercolor, 1950, 17" x 23", Goriansky Family Collection

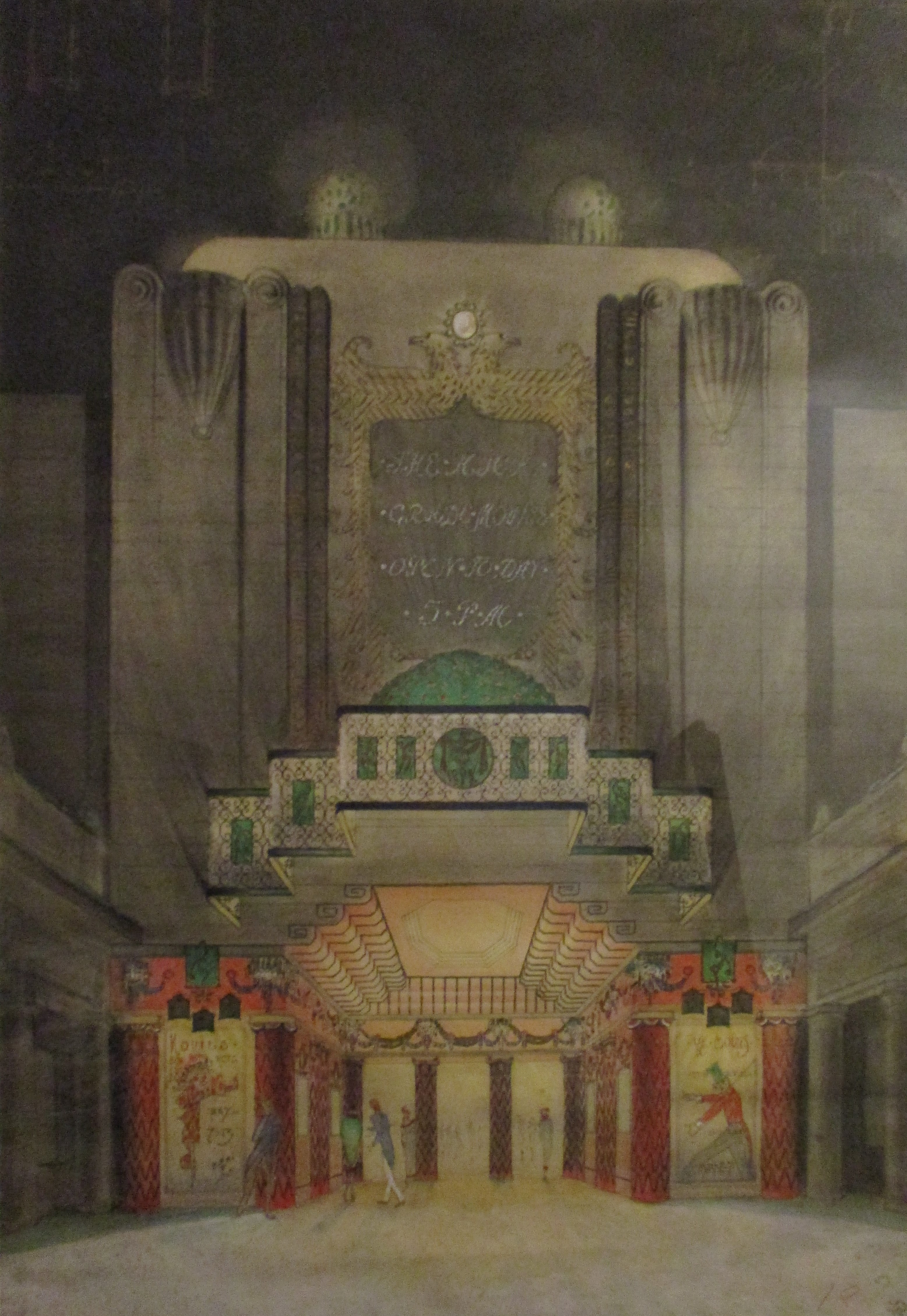
Evening at the Theater, by LVG, drawing with colorant, 1924, Francis Ward Chandler Prize (MIT), 22" x 34", Goriansky Family Collection

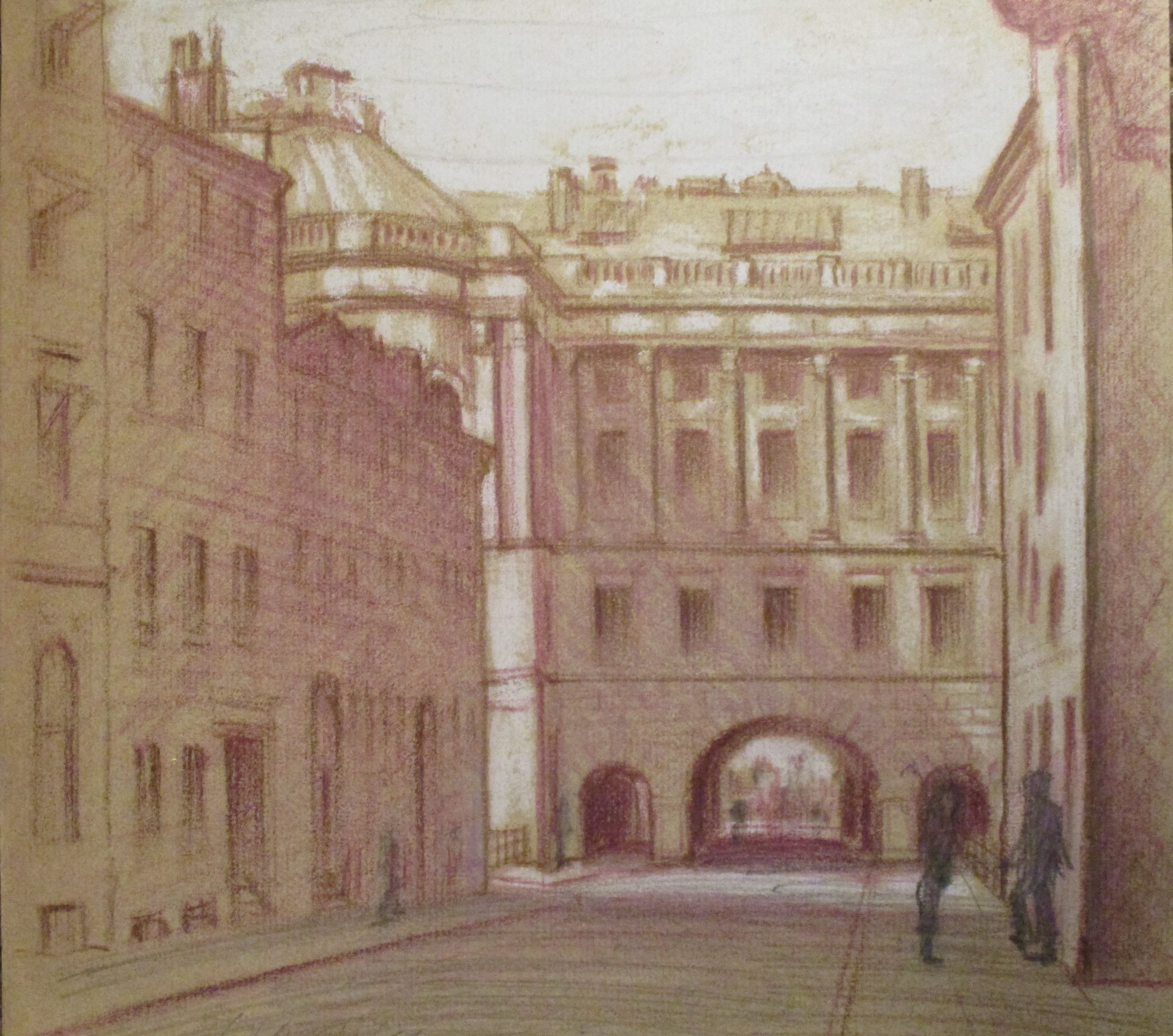
European Building Study 21, by LVG, pencil and charcoal on paper, 1934, 8 1/2" x 9", Goriansky Family Collection

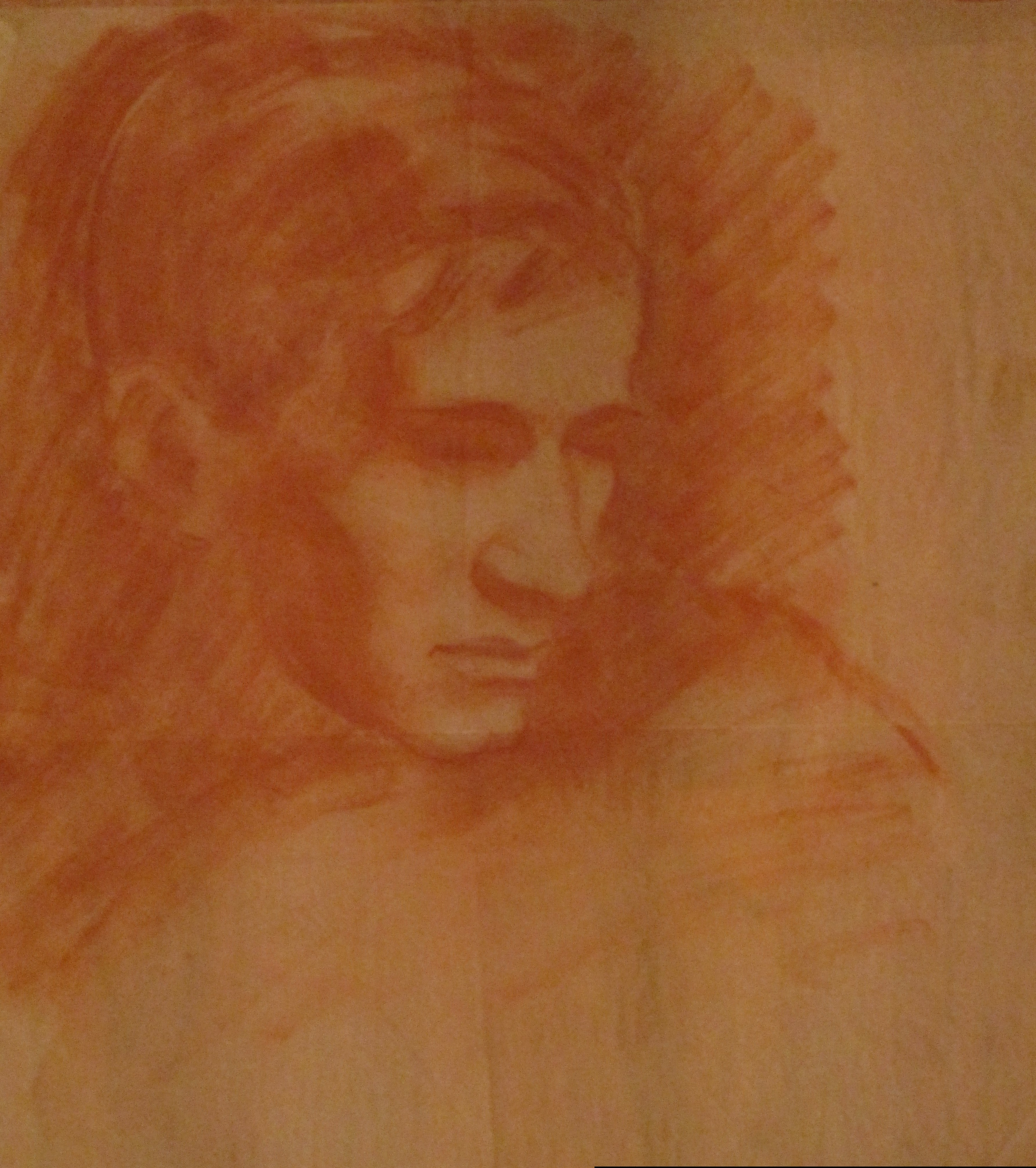
Male Study 26, by LVG, charcoal on paper, 1920s, 14" x 16", Goriansky Family Collection

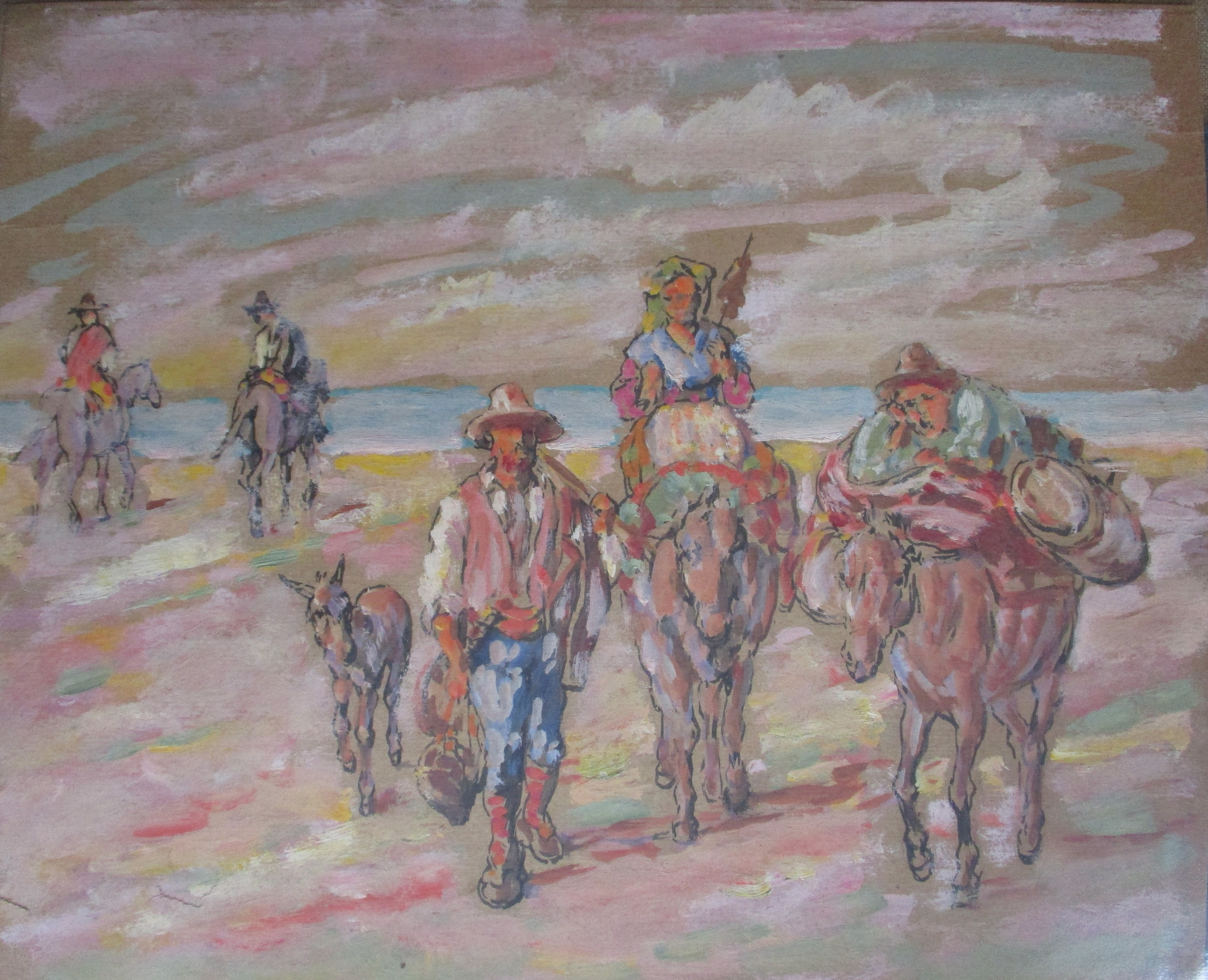
Breaking Camp, by LVG, drawing and gouache, Goriansky Family Collection

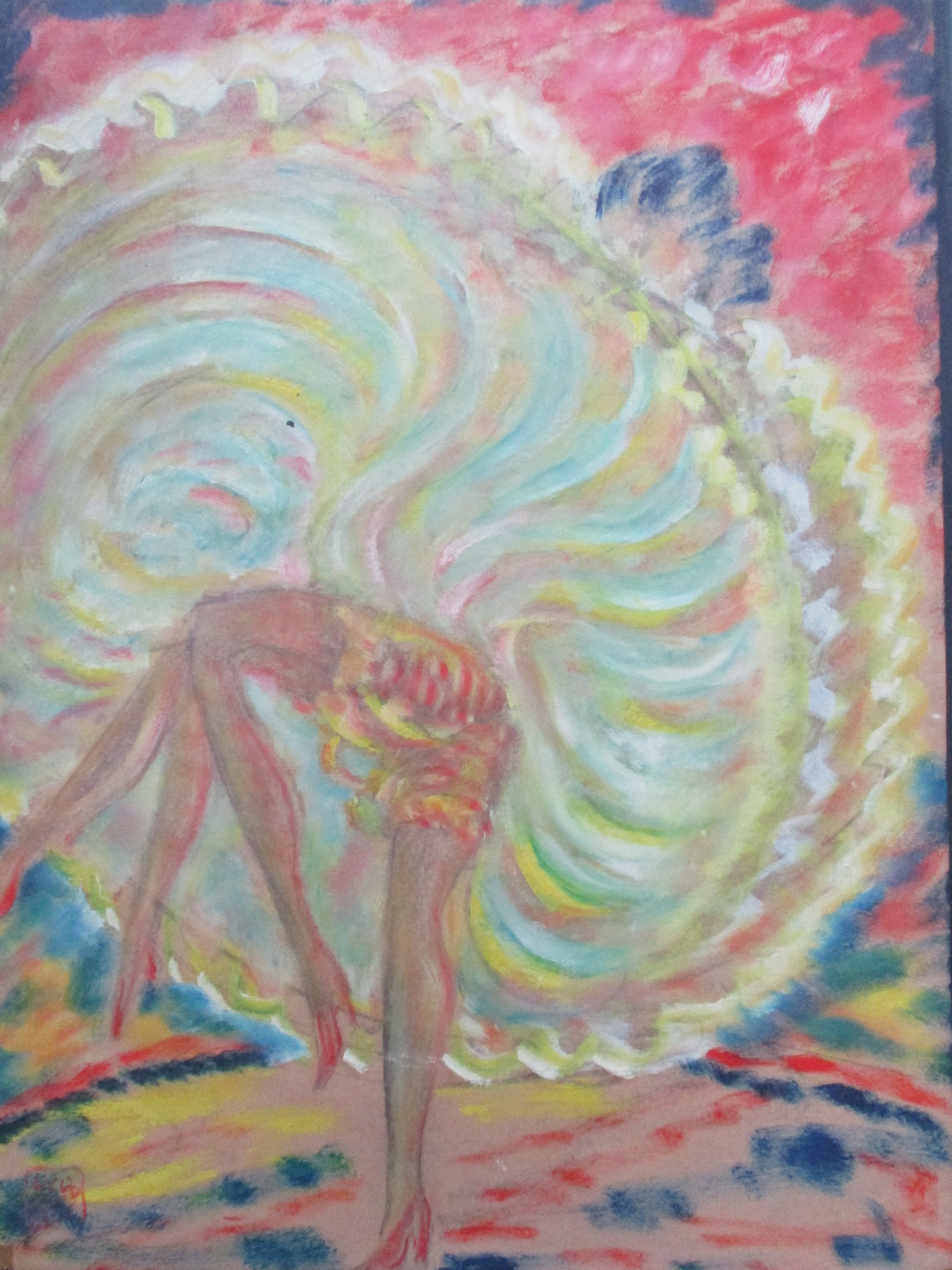
Cabaret, by LVG, 1935, gouache, Goriansky Family Collection

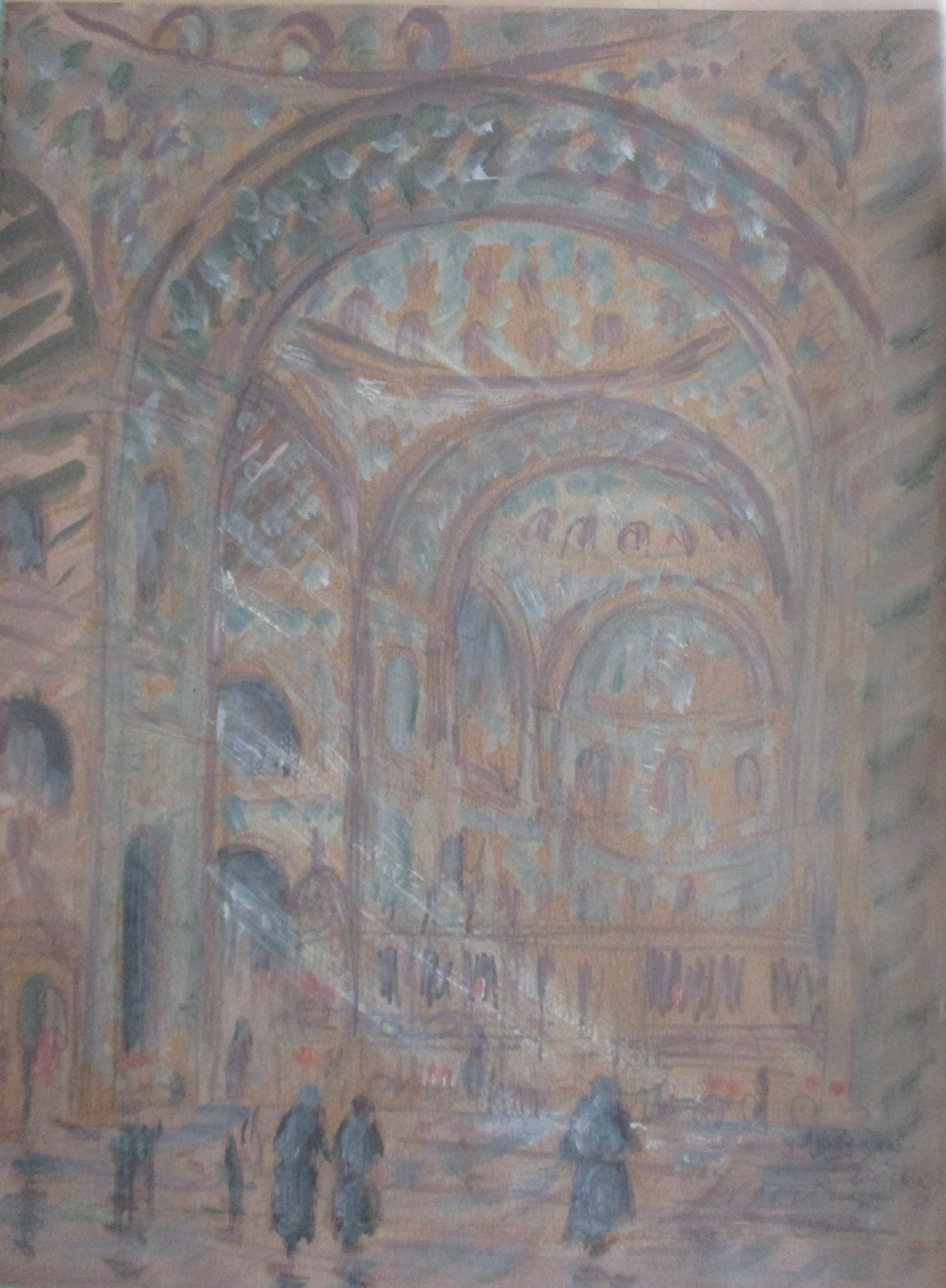
Cathedral Study 17, by LVG, 1929, drawing and gouache, Goriansky Family Collection

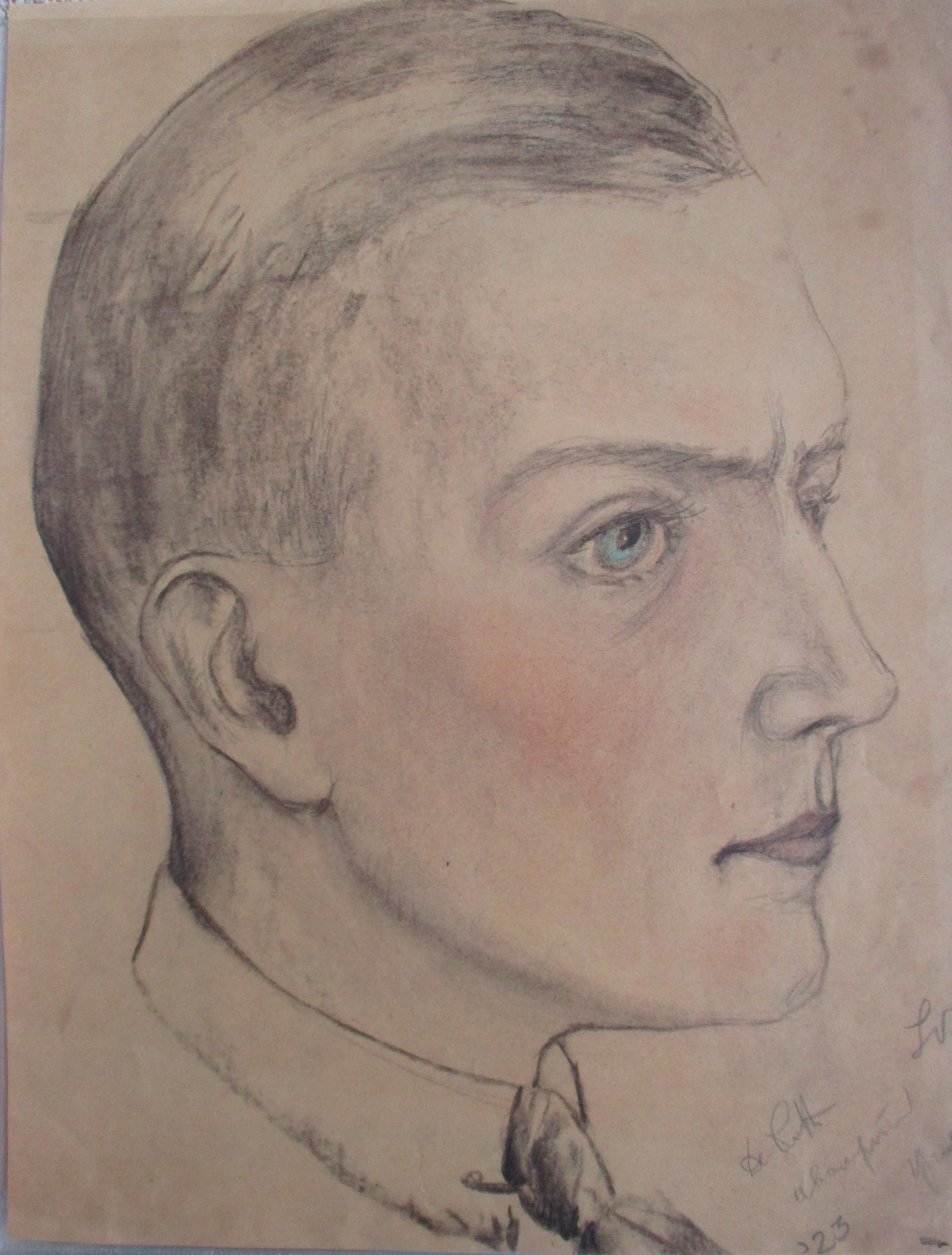
Figure Study 17, by LVG, 1923, pencil and charcoal, Goriansky Family Collection

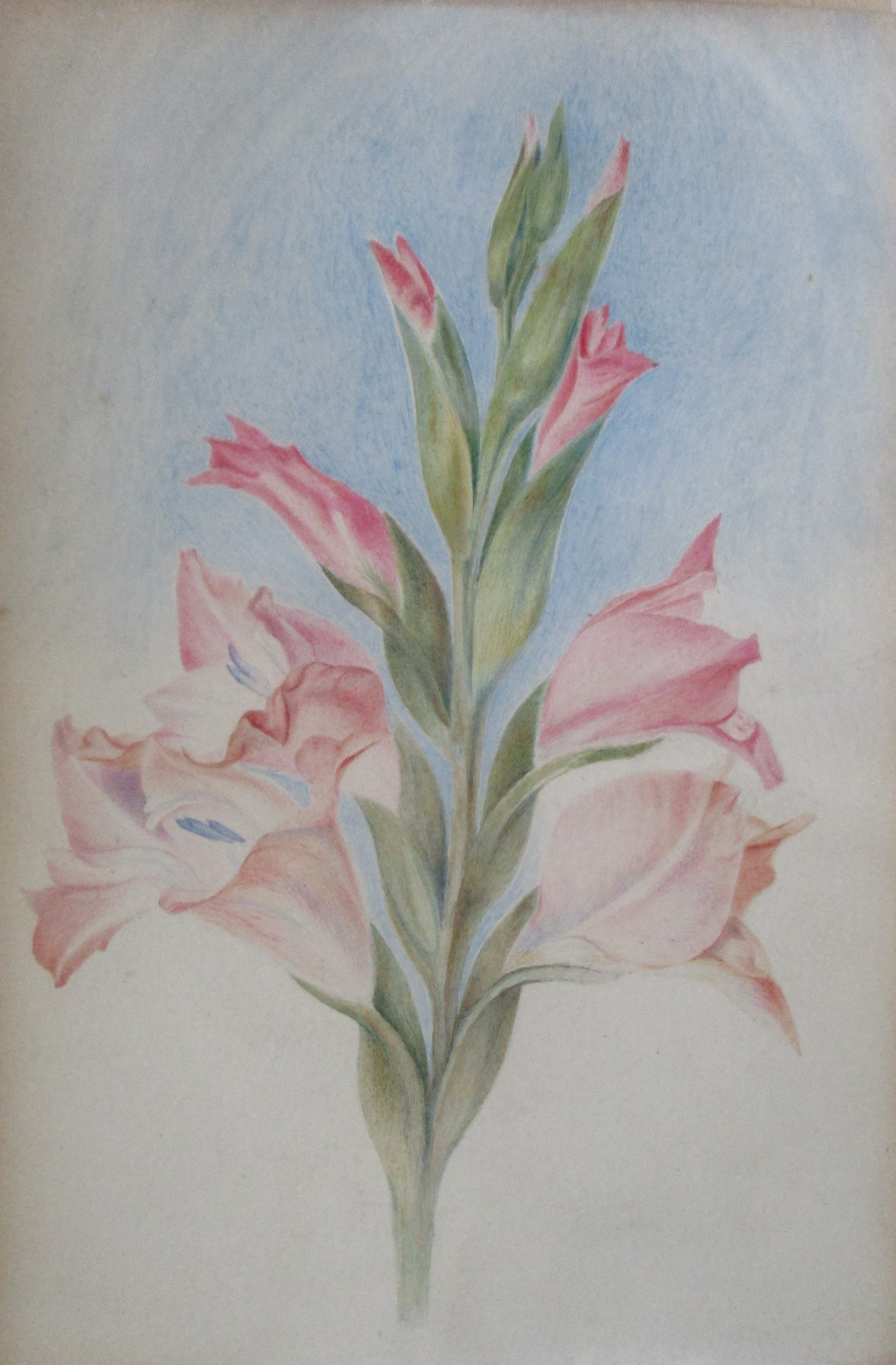
Flower Study 4, by LVG, charcoal, Goriansky Family Collection

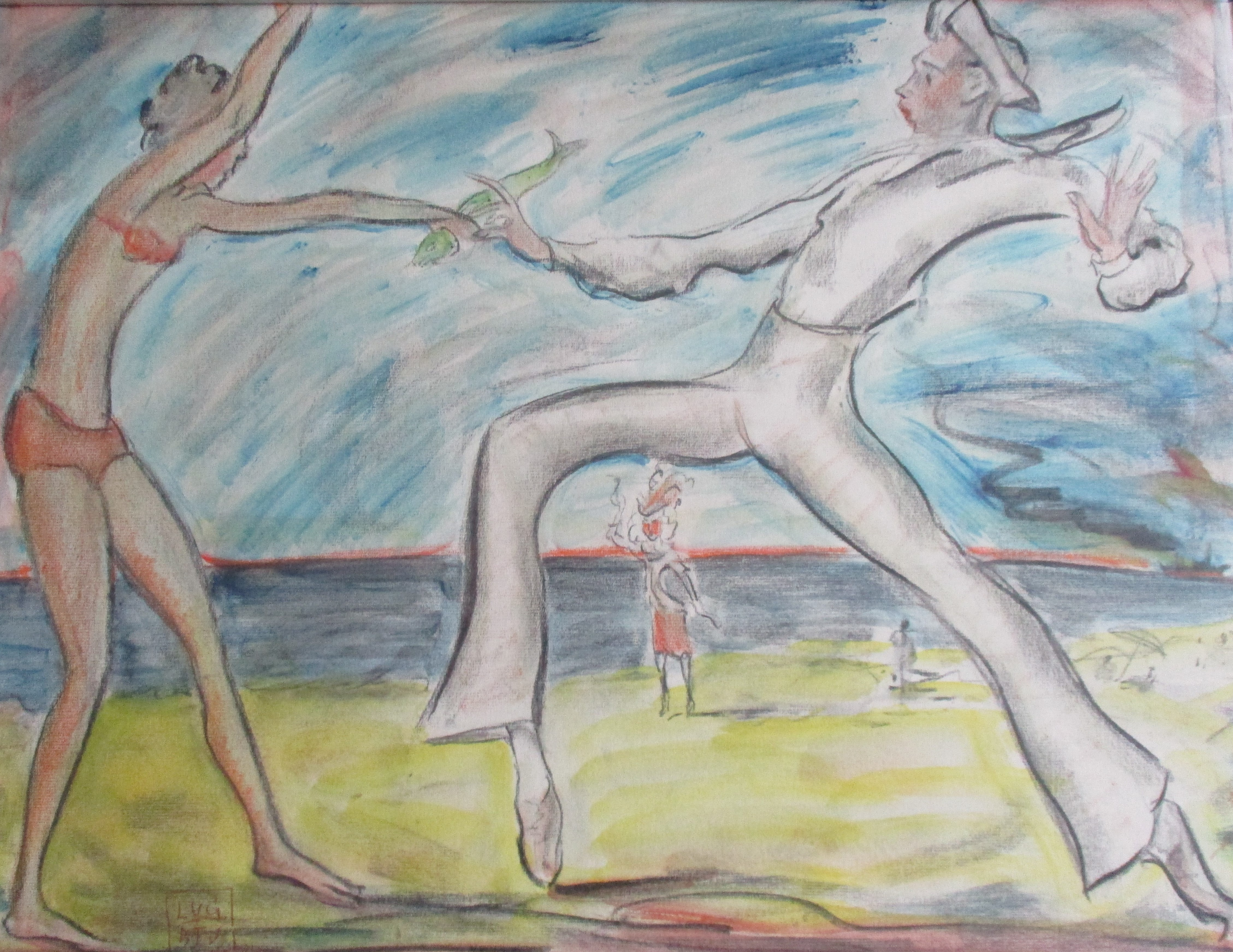
Day at the Beach, by LVG, 1935, drawing and gouache, Goriansky Family Collection

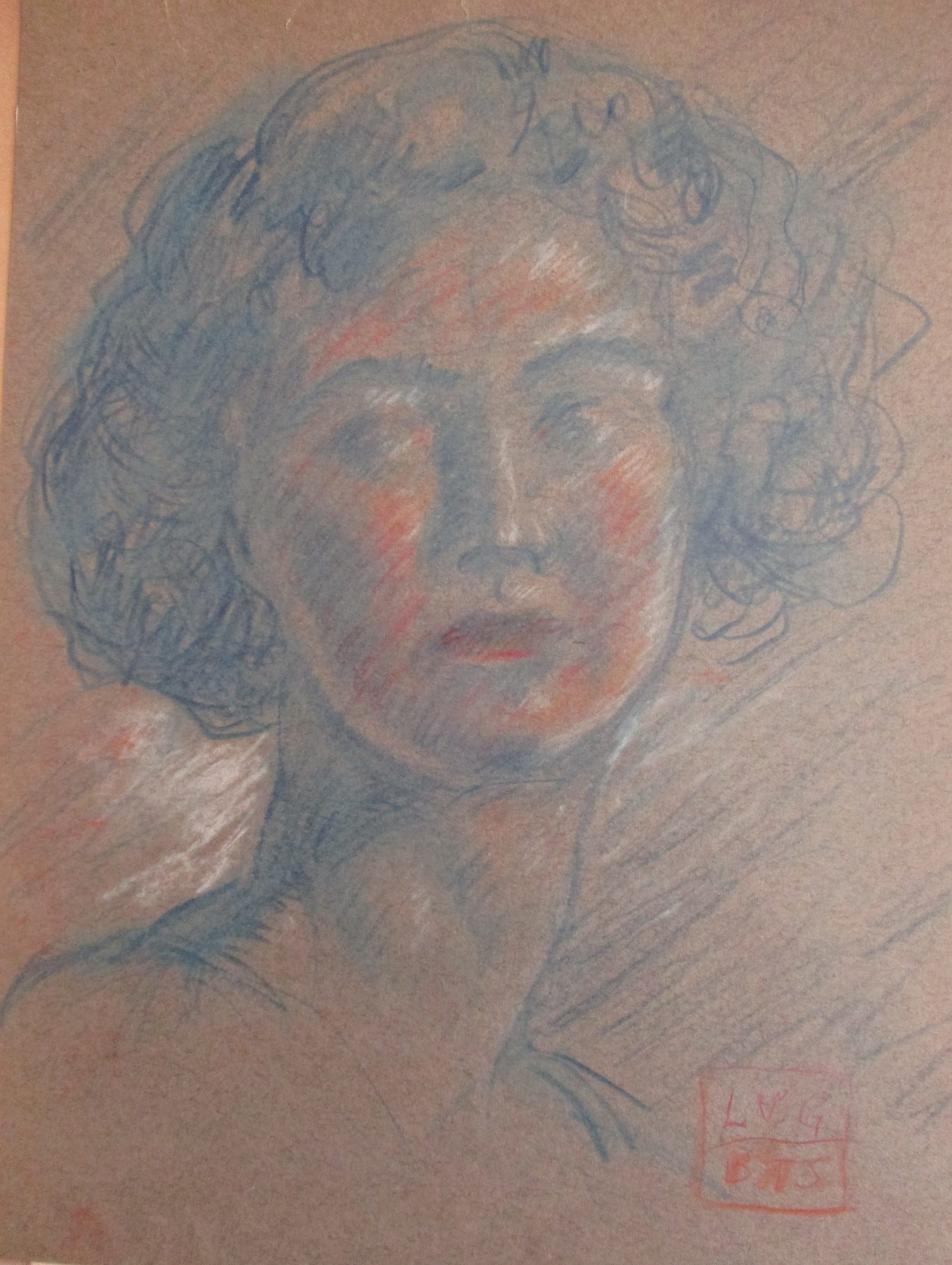
Figure Study 23, by LVG, pen and charcoal, Goriansky Family Collection

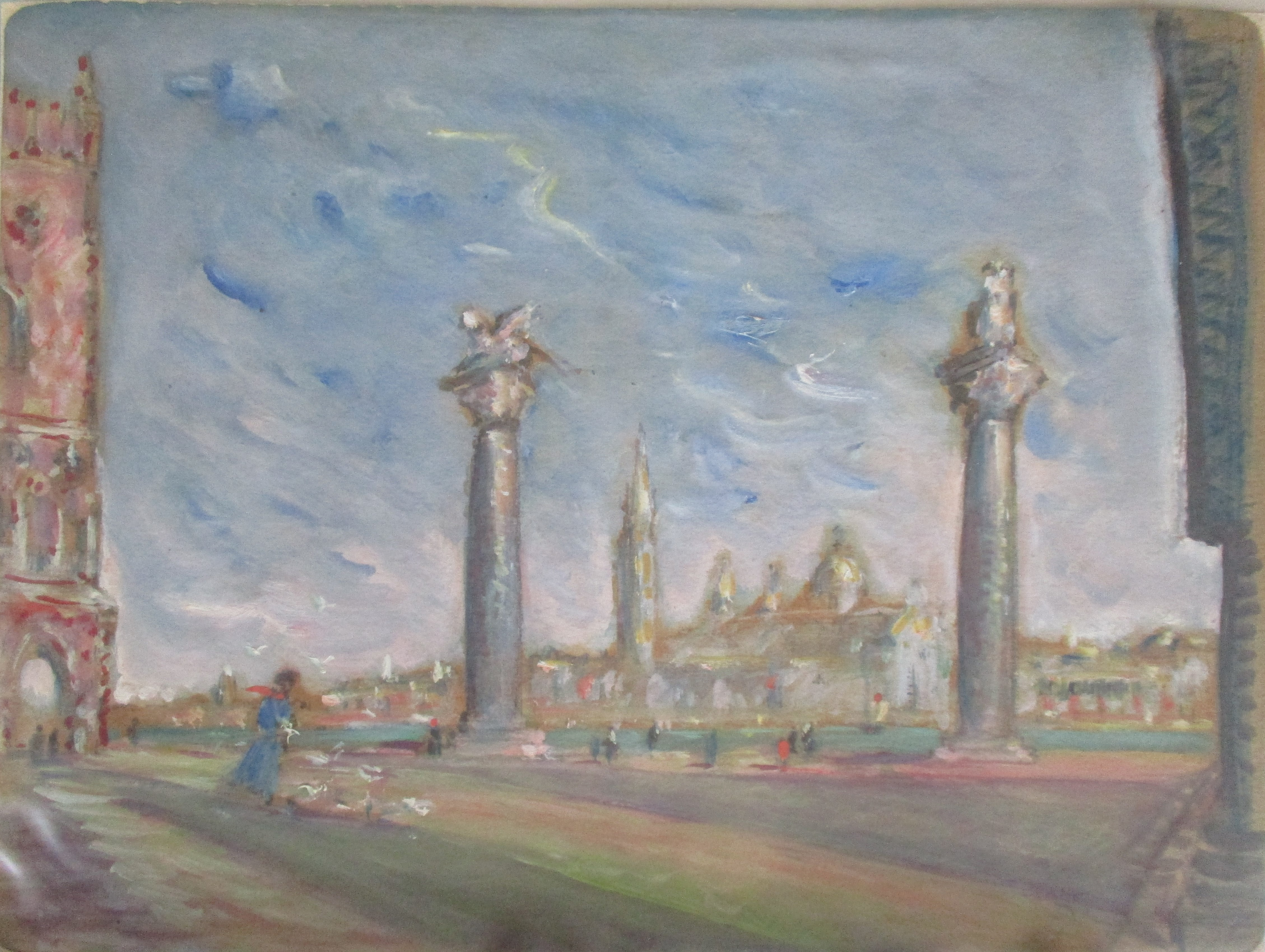
Venice 13, by LVG, 1935, drawing with gouache, Goriansky Family Collection

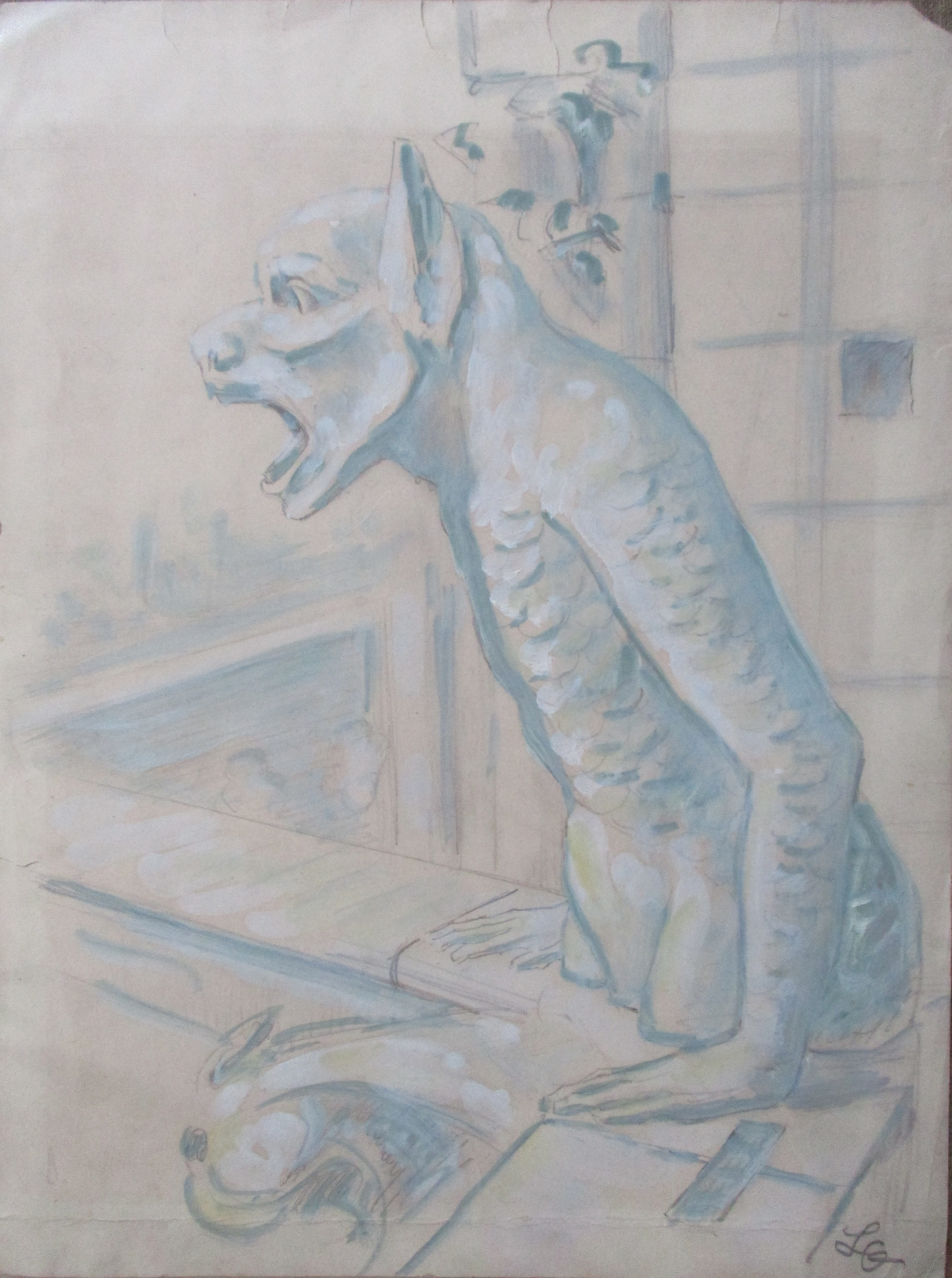
Notre Dame Gargoyle, by LVG, 1936, drawing with gouache, Goriansky Family Collection

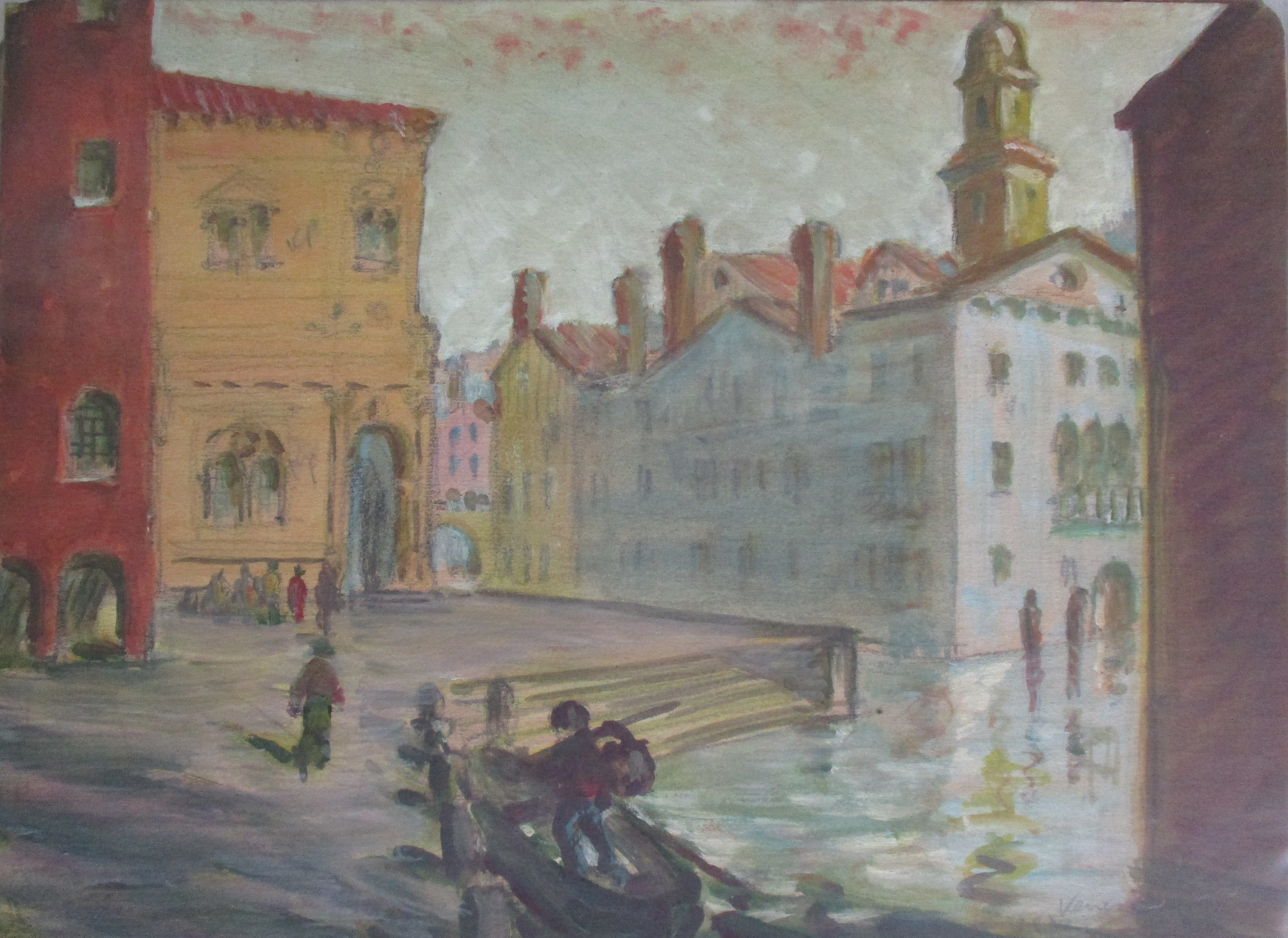
Venice 24, by LVG, 1934, drawing with gouache, Goriansky Family Collection

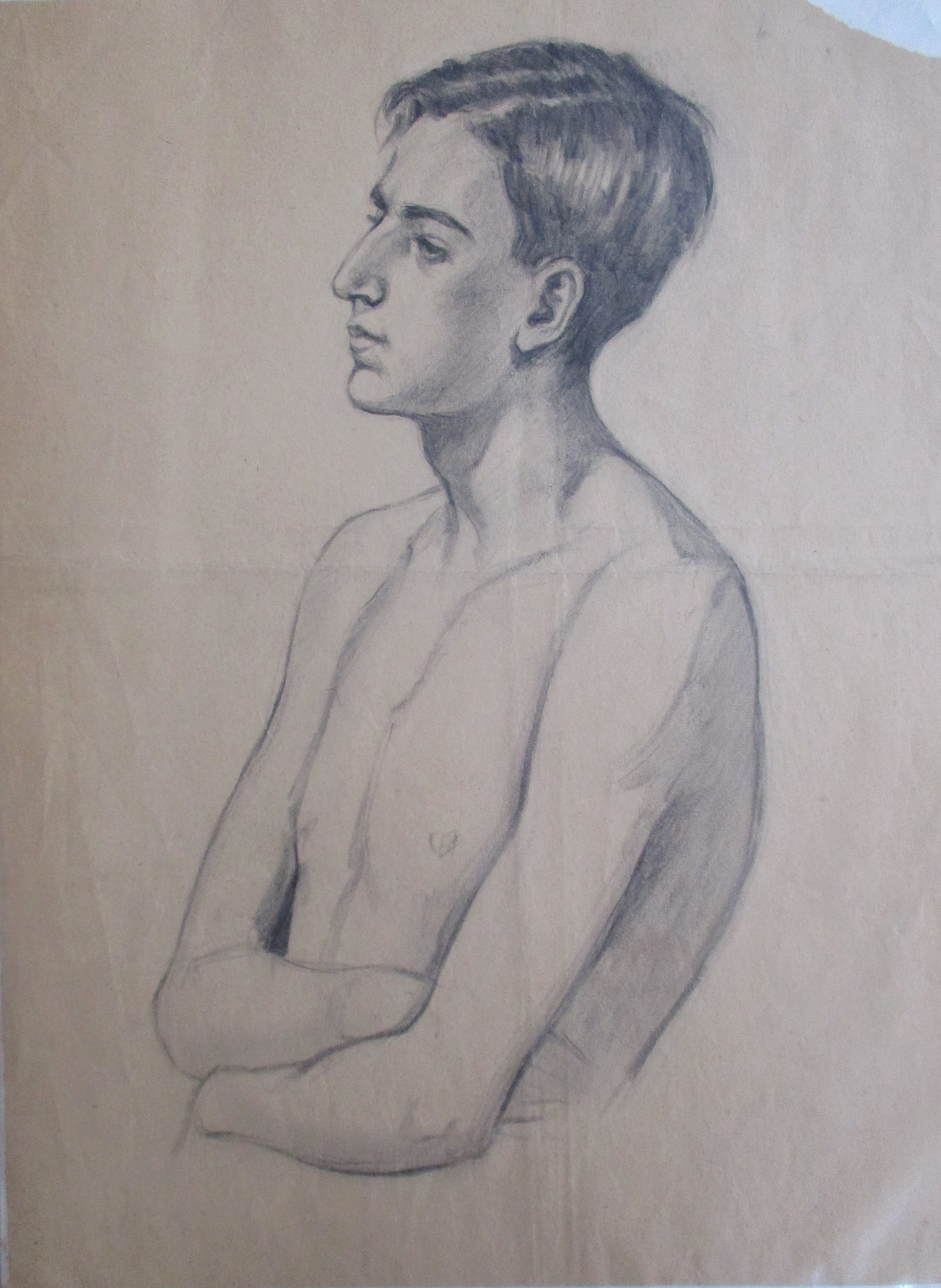
Figure Study 42, by LVG, 1923, pencil, Goriansky Family Collection

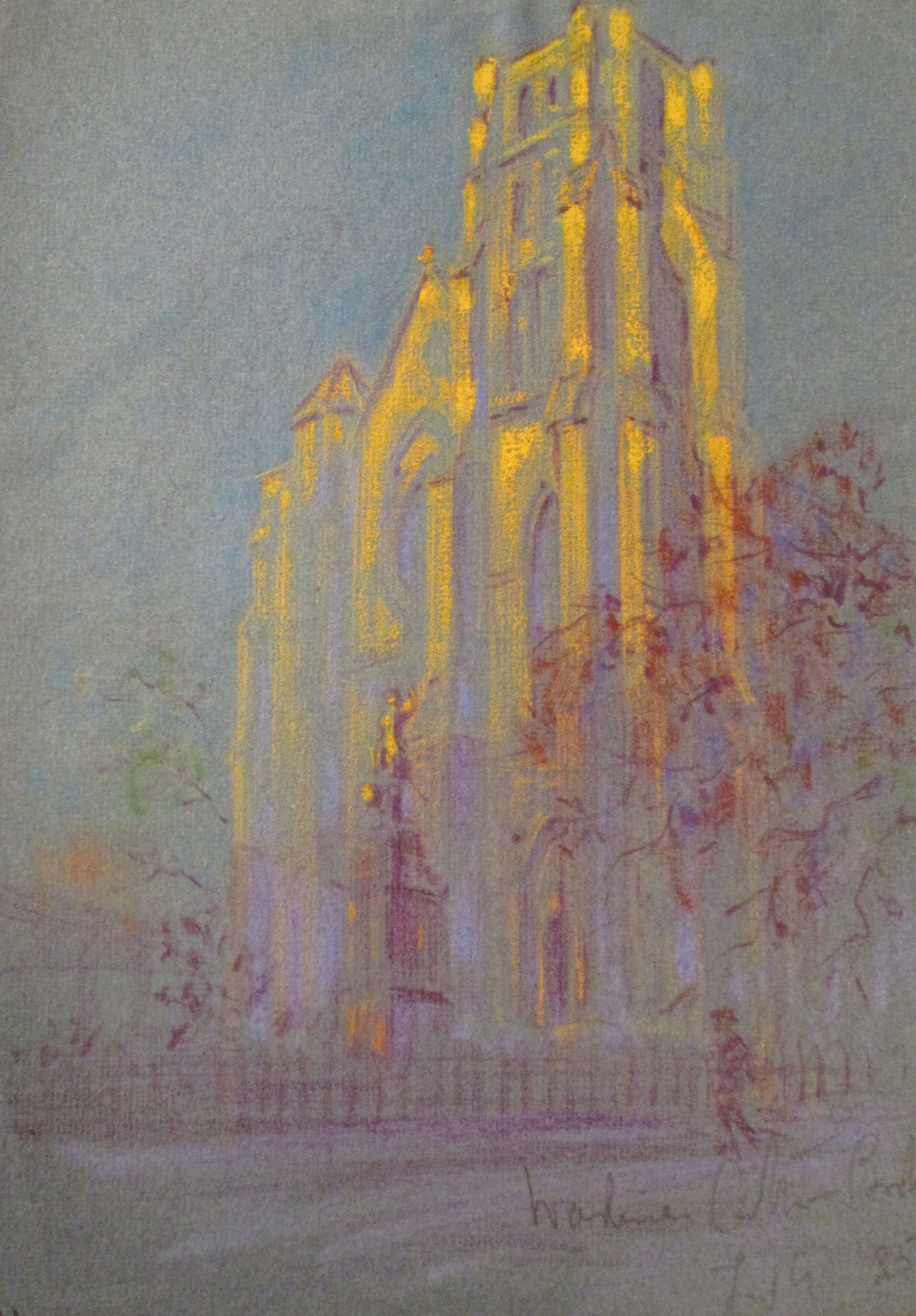
Cathedral Study 9, by LVG, 1925, charcoal, Goriansky Family Collection

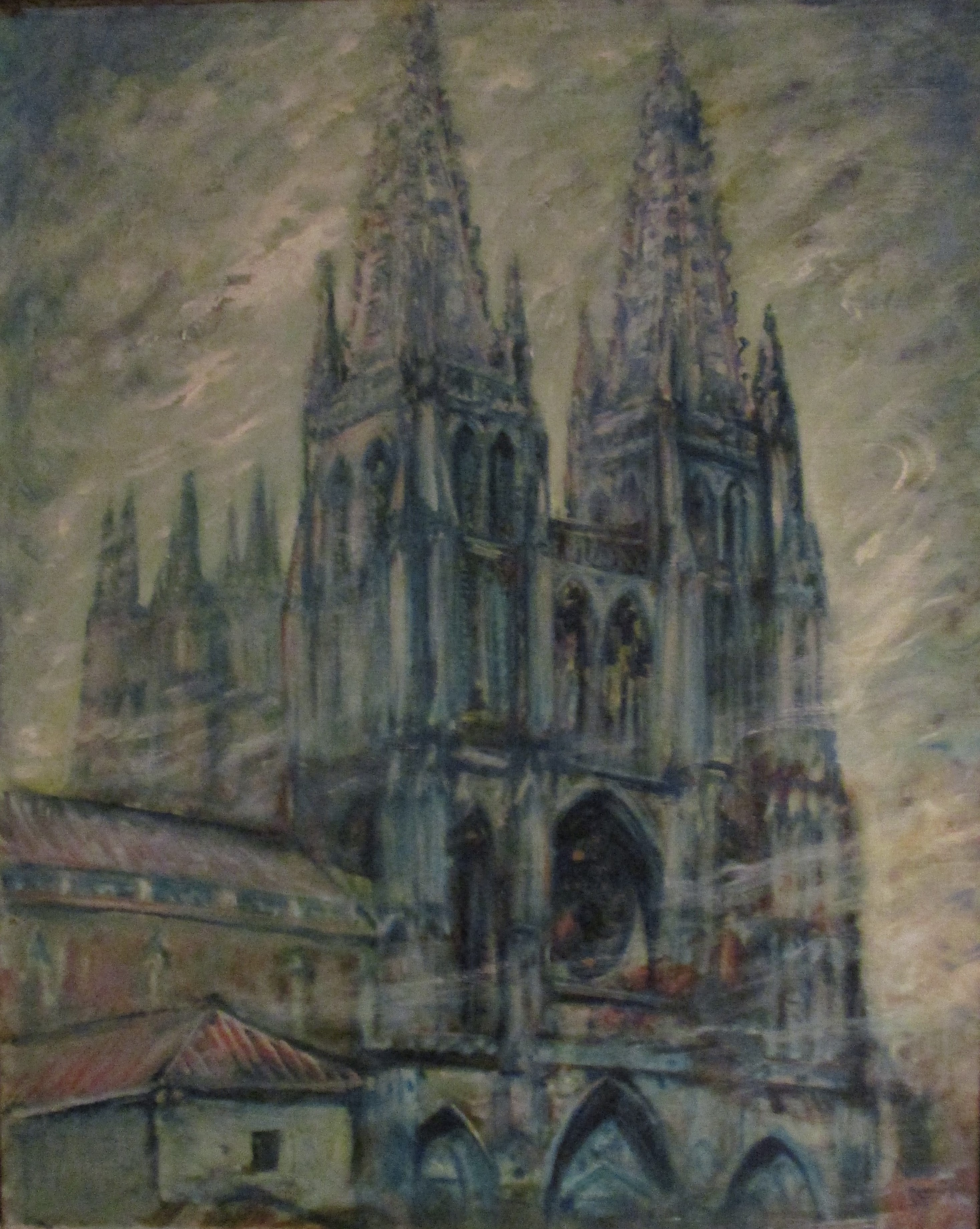
European Cathedral 3, by LVG, 1940, oil on canvas, Goriansky Family Collection

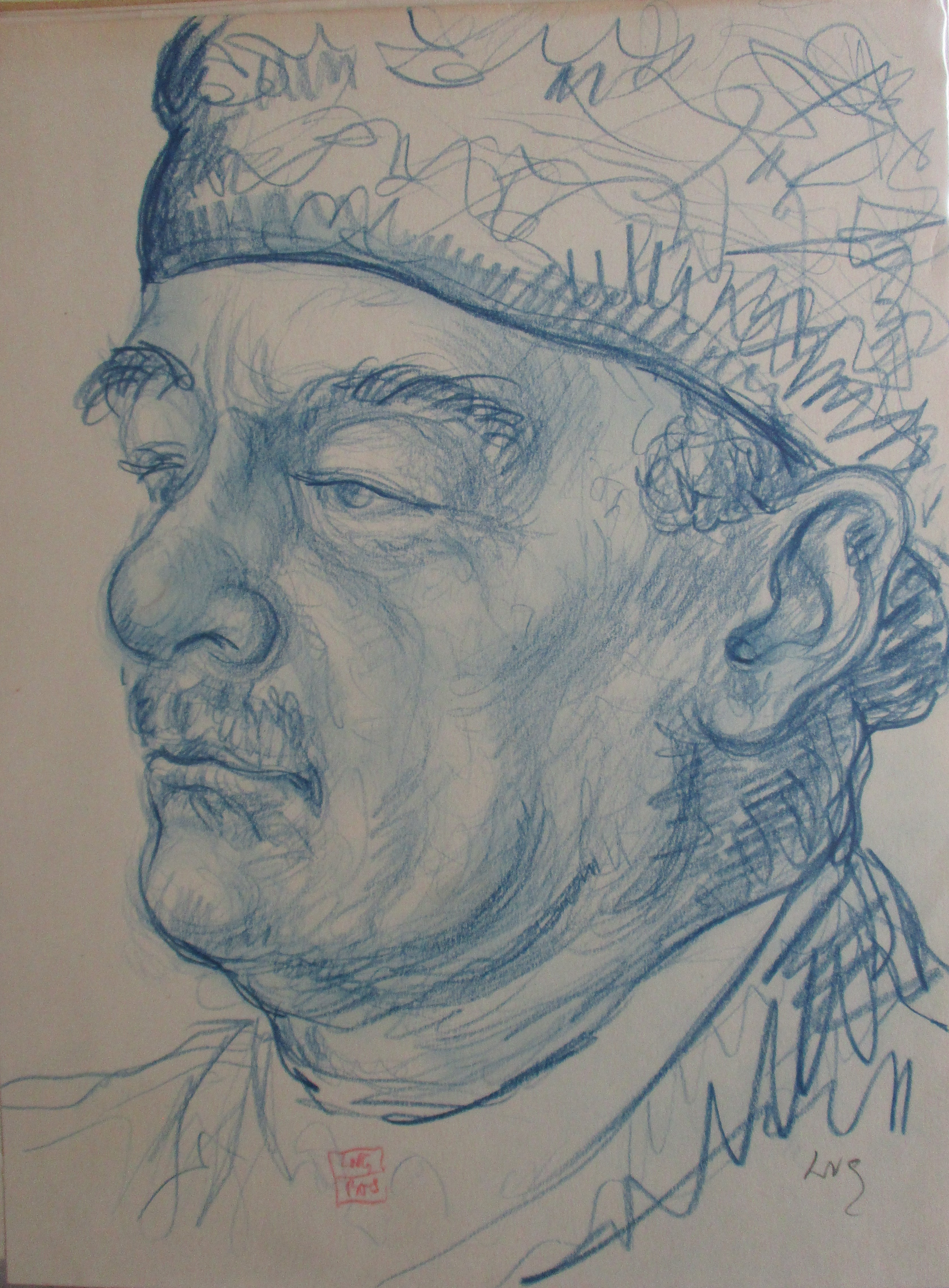
Figure Study 27, by LVG, 1924, pen and chalk, Goriansky Family Collection

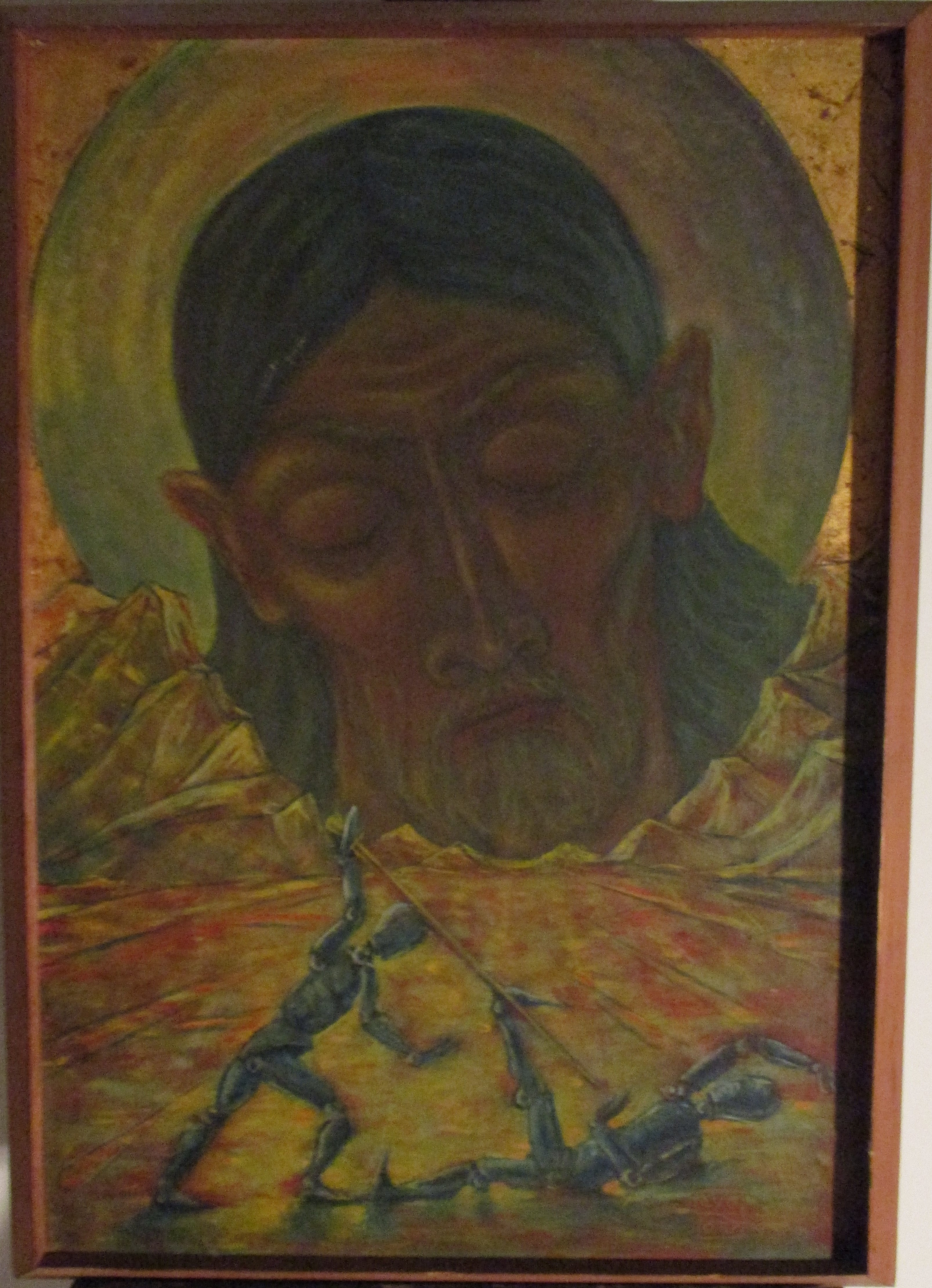
Praying for Humanity, by LVG 1945, 18" x 26" Oil on Board, Goriansky Family Collection

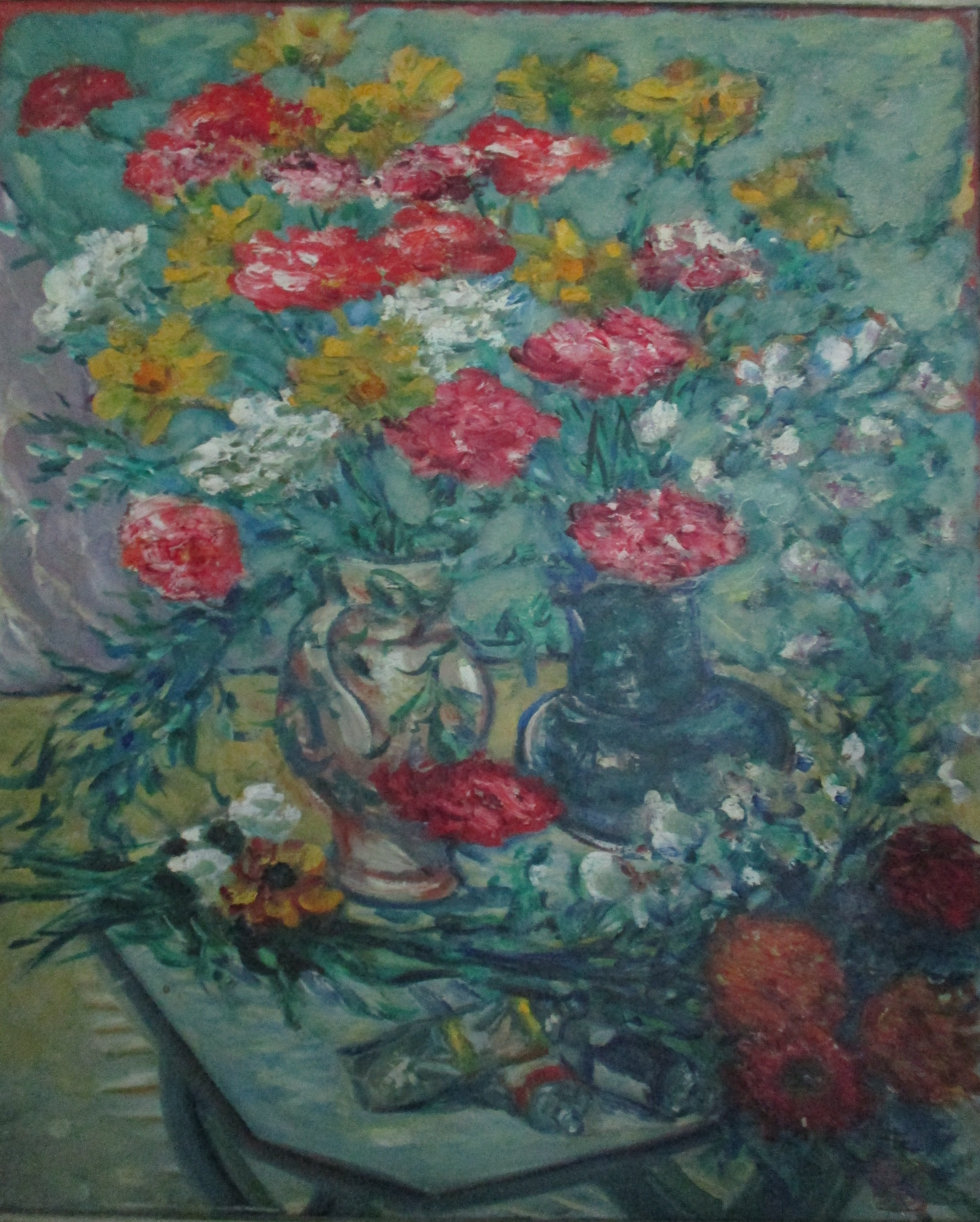
Bouquet # 16 by LVG, 1950, 20" X 23", Oil on Canvas, Goriansky Family Collection

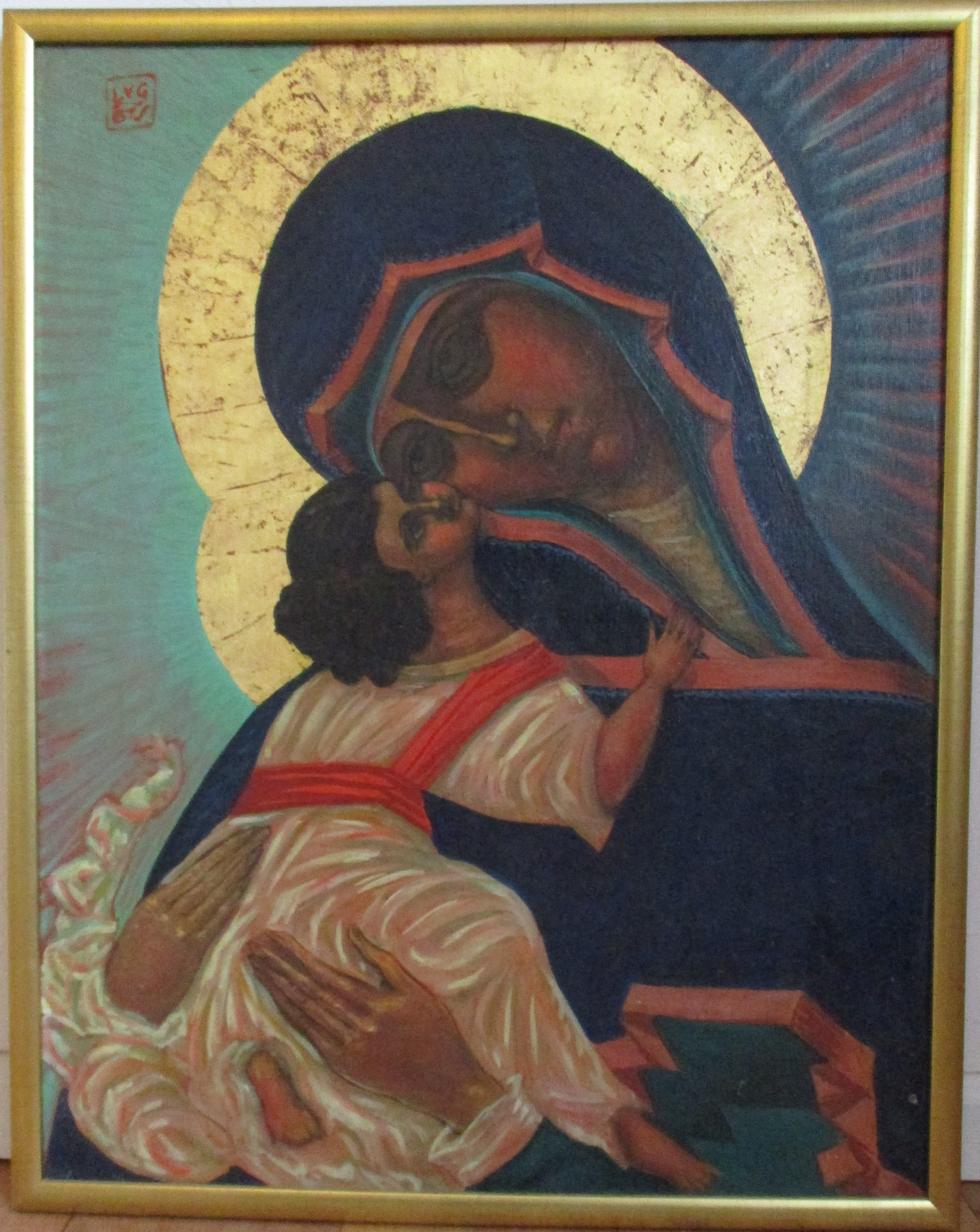
Virgin of Vladimir by LVG, 1940, Goriansky Family Collection

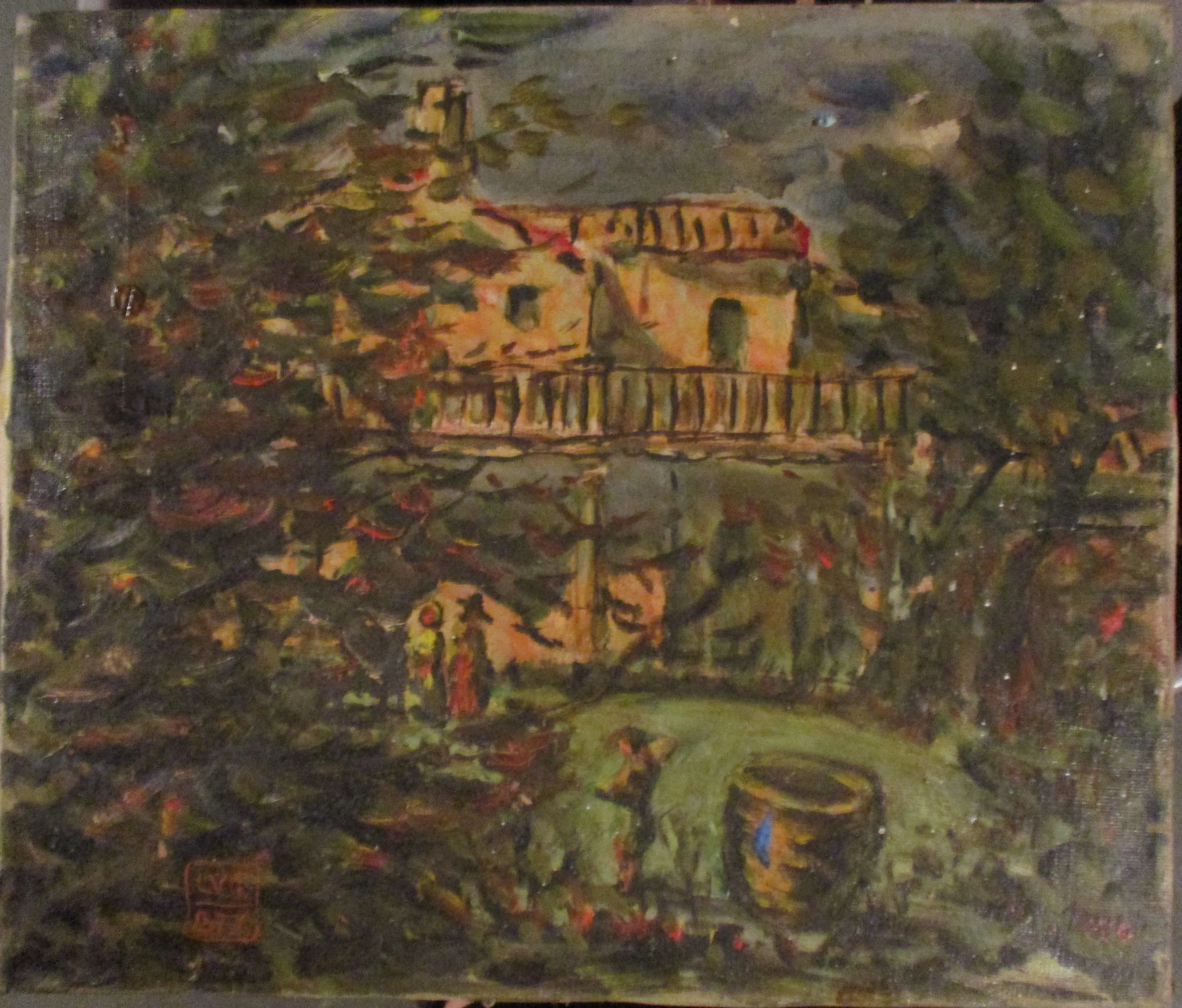
Florence Garden, by LVG, 1935, Goriansky Family Collection

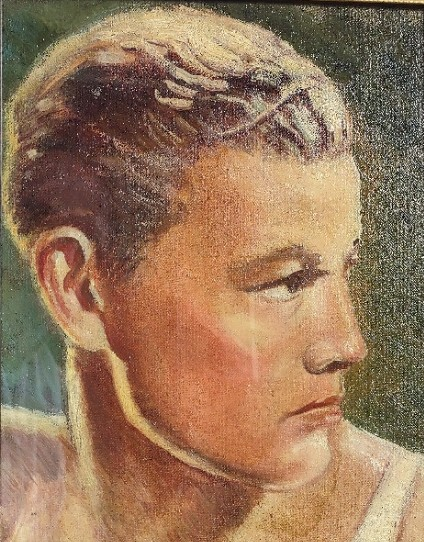
"Figure Study 41", By LVG, 1925, Oil on Panel 8" x 10", Goriansky Family Collection

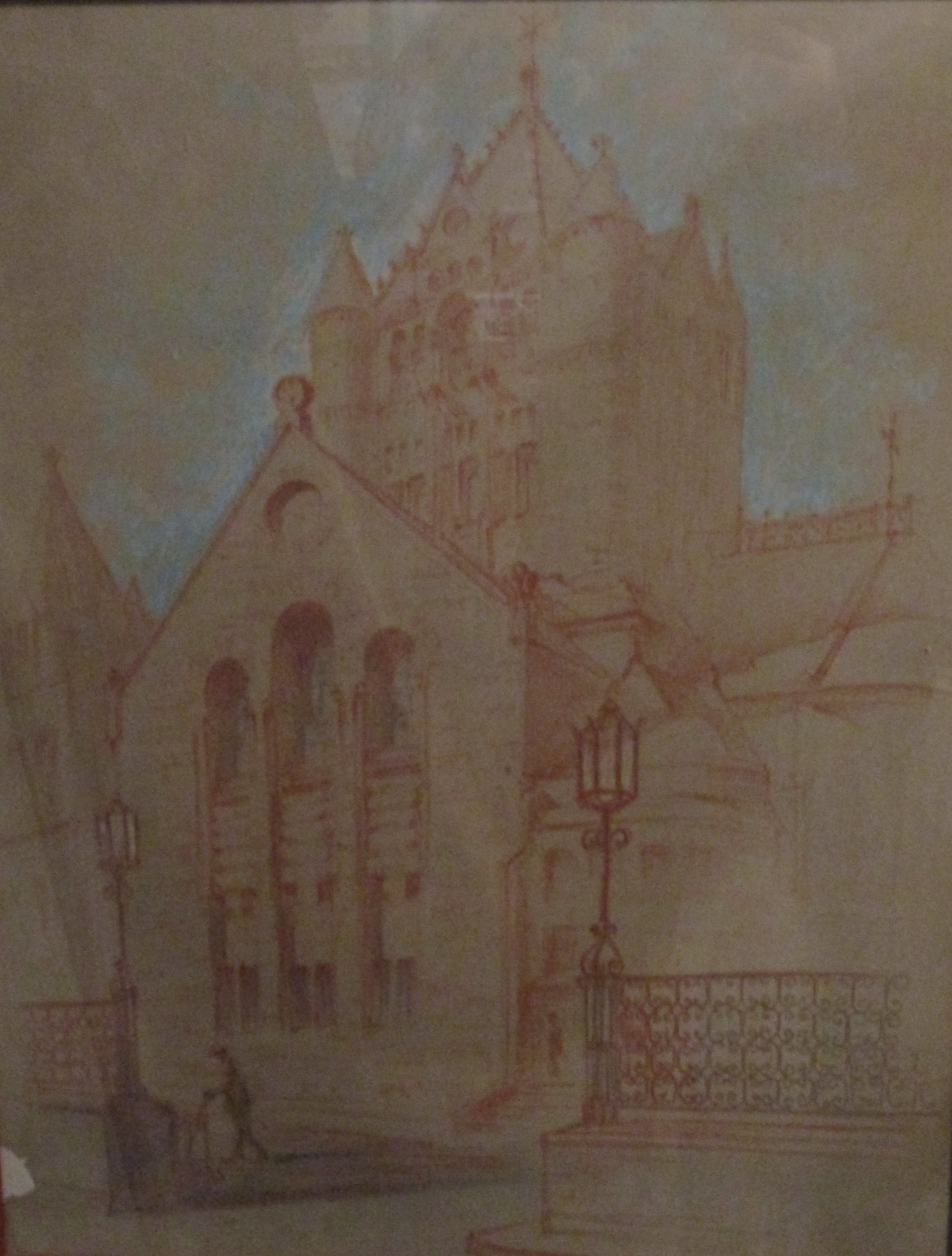
"Trinity Church", Copley Square, Boston MA, By LVG, 1928, Drawing & Charcoal, 16" x 21", Goriansky Family Collection

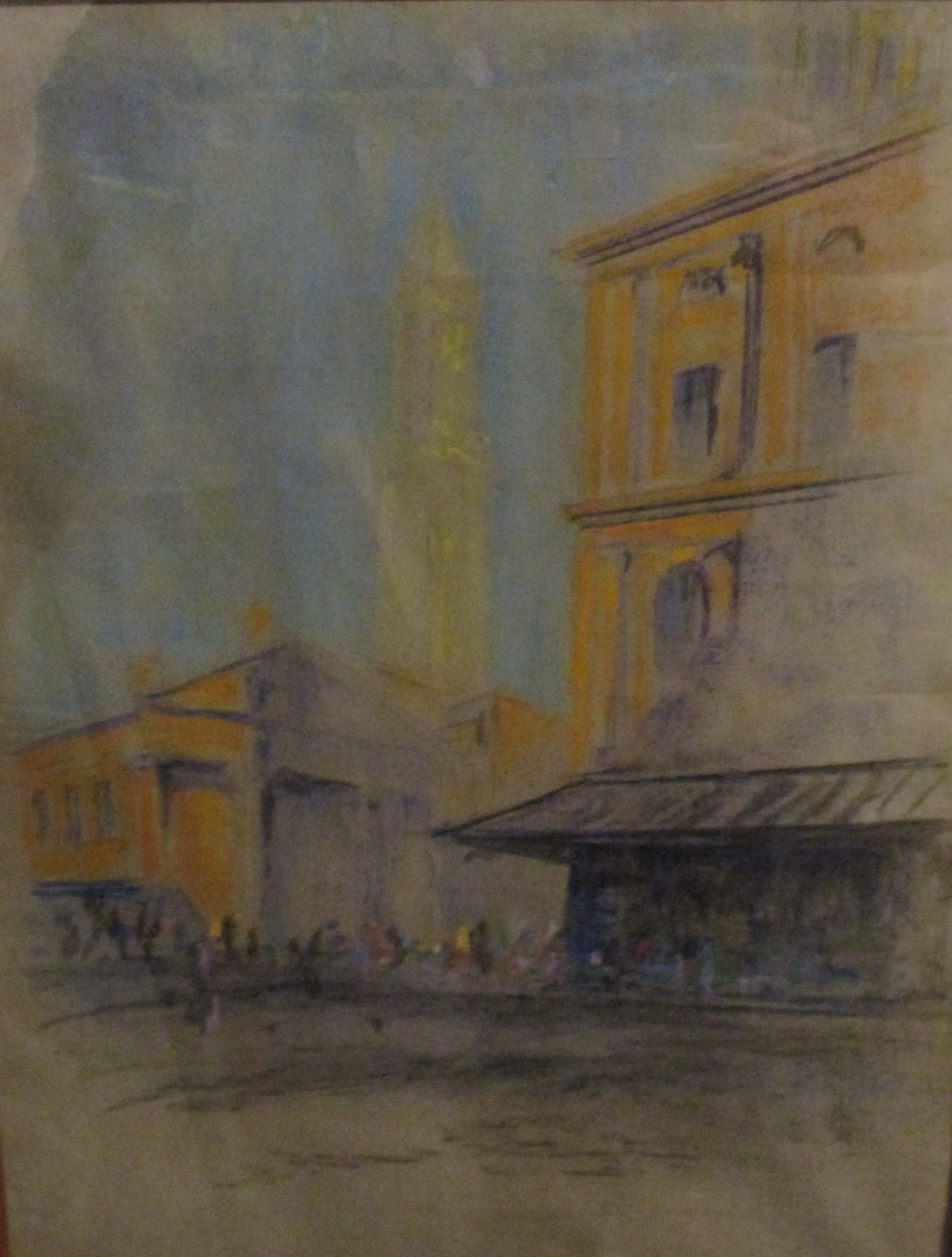
"Faneuil Hall Market Place", Boston MA, By LVG, 1928, Drawing & Charcoal, 16" x 21", Goriansky Family Collection

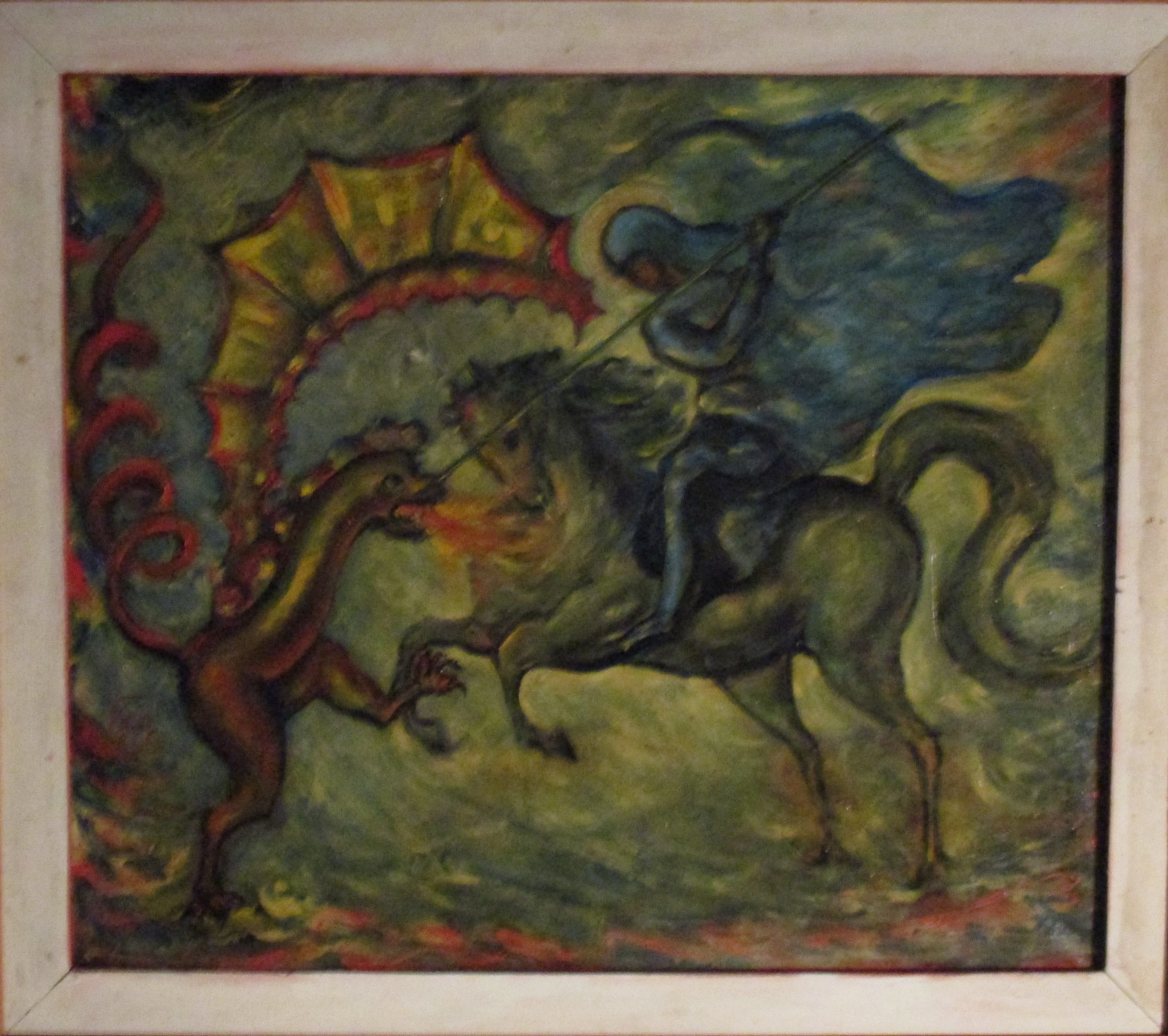
"Confronting Demons", By LVG, 1935, Oil on Canvas, 24" x 28", Goriansky Family Collection

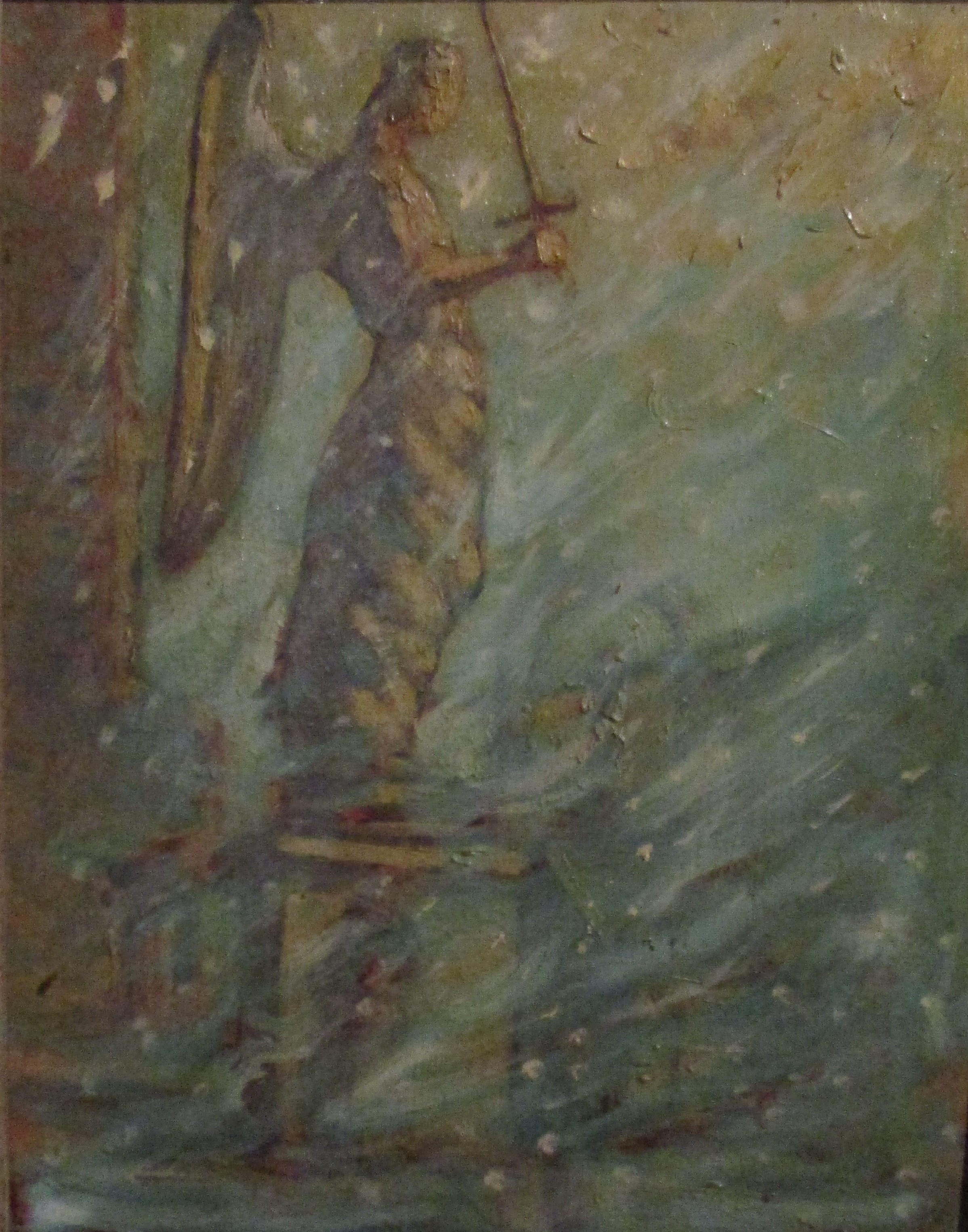
"Angel with Sword", By LVG, 1934, Oil on Panel, 10" x 13", Goriansky Family Collection

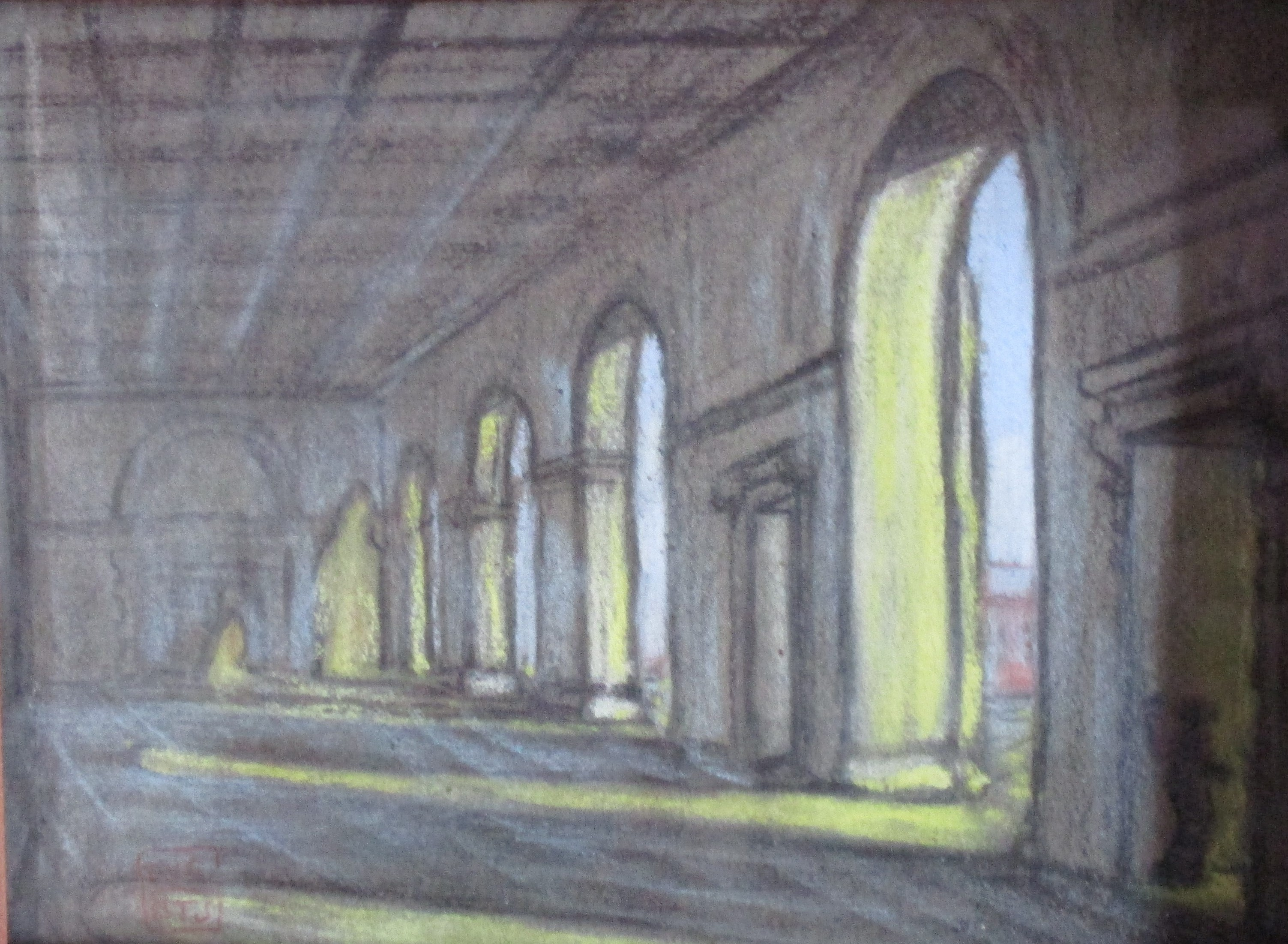
"European Hall Interior", By LVG, 1935, 6" x 8", Pastel/Charcoal, Goriansky Family Collection

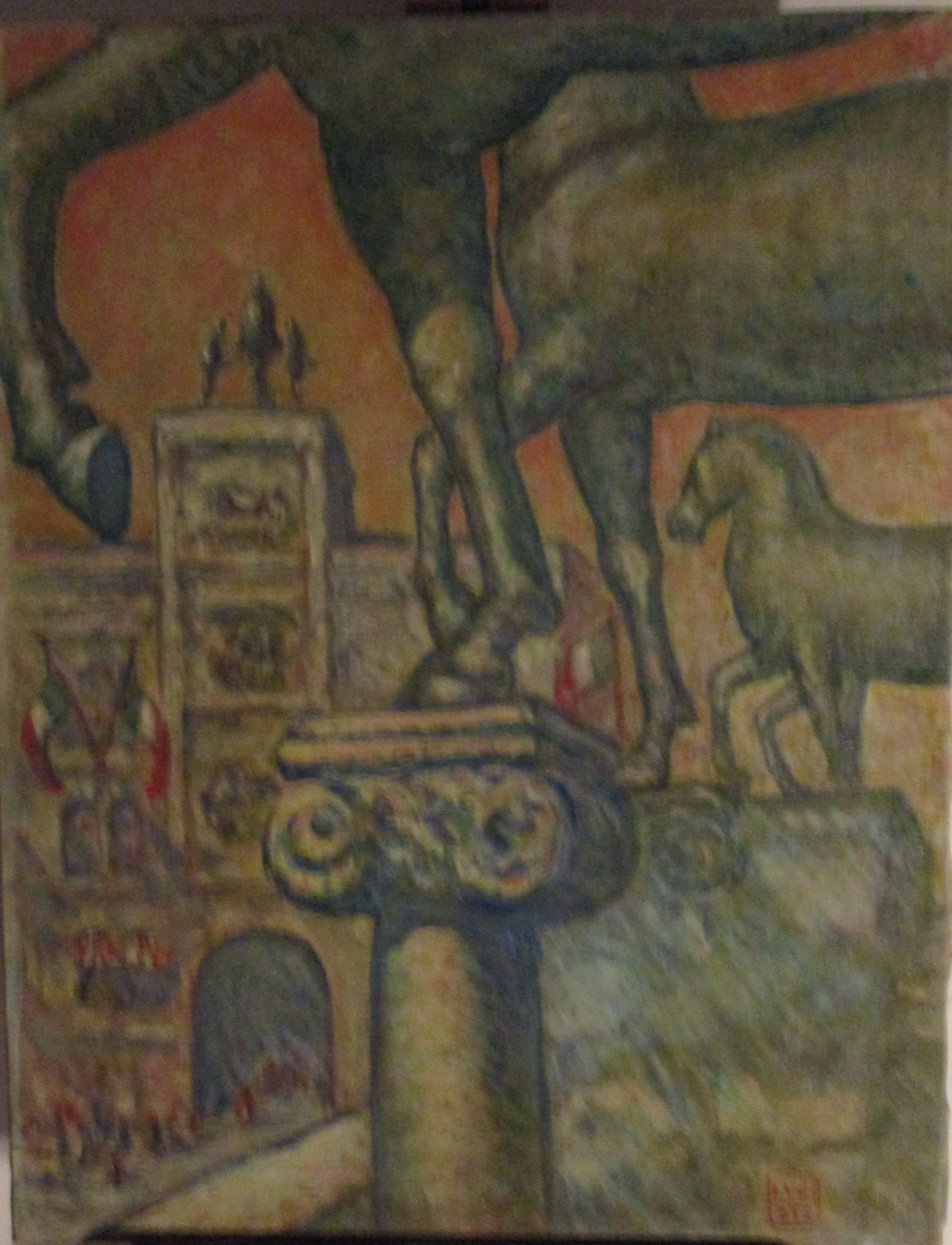
"European Monument Study", By LVG, 1935, 24"x 31", Oil on Canvas, Goriansky Family Collection

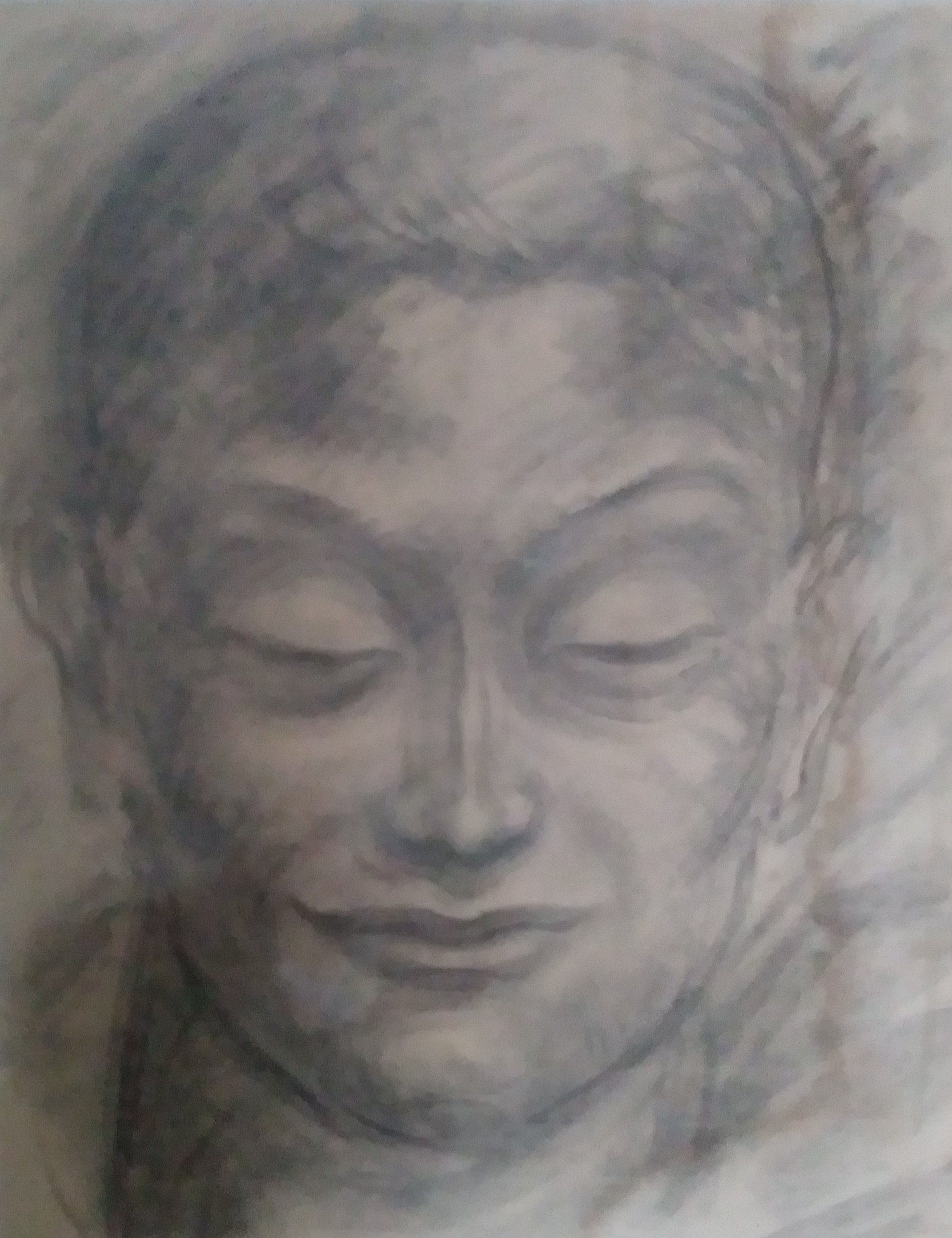
"Buddha Study", By LVG, 1928, 17" x 22", Charcoal Pencil, Goriansky Family Collection

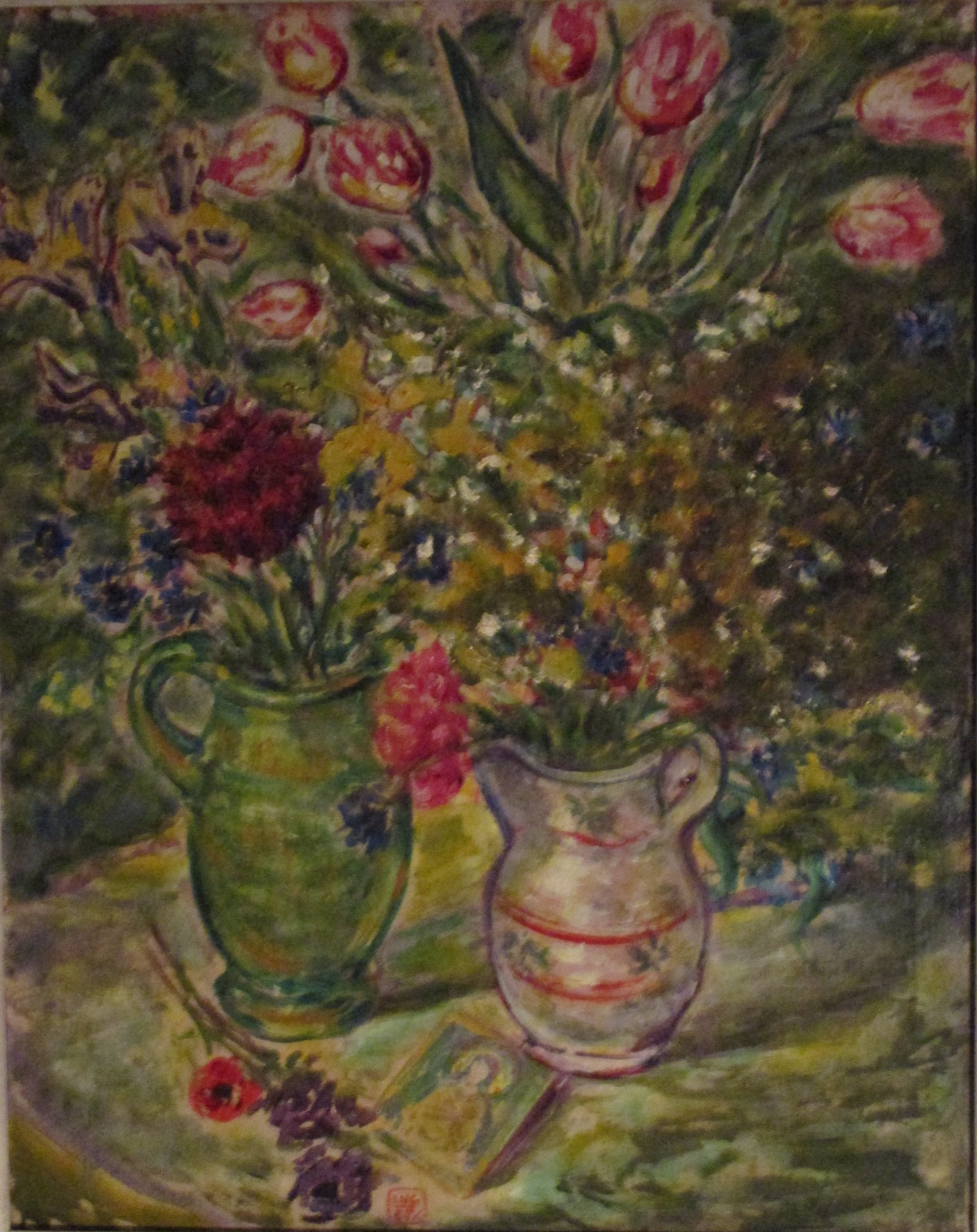
"Bouquet 32", By LVG, 1940, Oil on Canvas, 22" x 29", Goriansky Family Collection

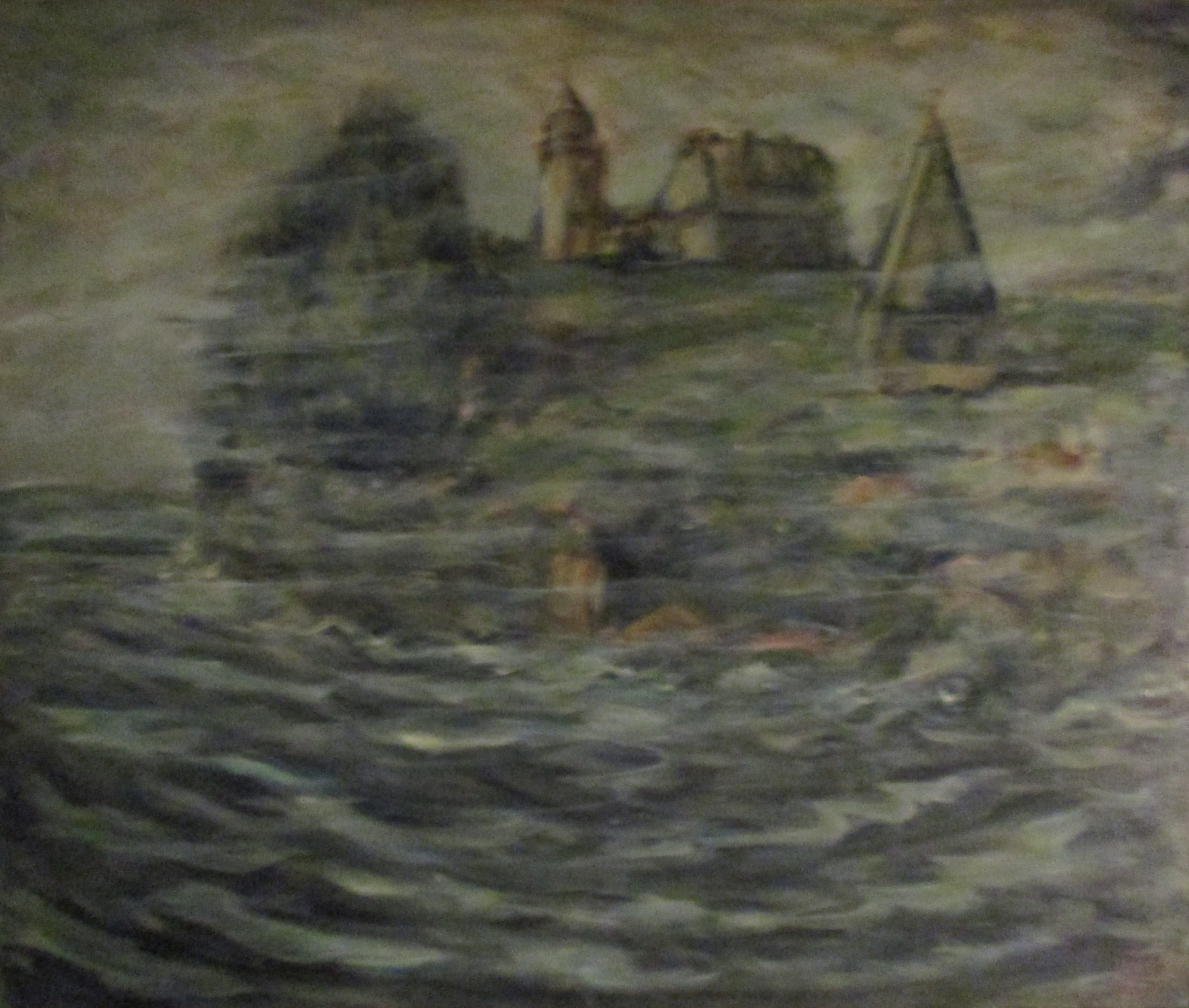
"Bear Island Maine Light House", 1940, Oil on Canvas, 24" x 29", Goriansky Family Collection

== Personal life ==
In 1927 in New York City, Goriansky married Carola Eliot from Brookline, Massachusetts. She was the daughter of Charles Eliot and Mary Yale Pitkin from Philadelphia (1865–1946); the marriage produced two sons. In 1942 the couple purchased 148 Main Street in Andover Massachusetts, where the family lived until 1990.

== Museum links ==
- Farnsworth Art Museum
- Worcester Art Museum
- Harvard Art Museums
- Museum of Fine Arts, Boston
