= Arthur MacArthur =

Arthur MacArthur is the name of:

- Arthur MacArthur Sr. (1815–1896), lieutenant governor of Wisconsin and acting governor for four days; United States federal judge
- Arthur MacArthur Jr. (1845–1912), his son, general in the United States Army and the Military Governor of the occupied Philippines
- Arthur MacArthur III (1876–1923), his son, captain in the United States Navy
- Arthur MacArthur IV (born 1938), son of Douglas MacArthur and Jean MacArthur

== See also ==
- Arthur McArthur (born 1988), Canadian music producer
- Arthur McArthur (politician) (1884 – after 1933), Australian politician
