= Browning School =

Coordinates: 40°45′53.7″N 73°58′09.2″W

The Browning School

- Upper School (2026)

Location
- 52 East 62nd Street, New York City 10065; New York City, New York; United States

Information
- Type: Private
- Motto: Grytte
- Established: 1888
- Founder: John A. Browning
- President, board of trustees: Valda Witt
- Headmasters: John A. Browning (1888–1920); Arthur Jones (1920–1948); Lyman B. Tobin (1948–1952); Charles W. Cook (1952–1988); Stephen M. Clement, III (1988–2016); John M. Botti ( 2016 - Present)
- Faculty: 110
- Grades: K–12
- Gender: Male
- Enrollment: 431
- Student to teacher ratio: 6:1
- Campus: Urban
- Colors: Red and black
- Sports: NYCAL, NYSAIS
- Mascot: The Panther
- Accreditation: New York Interschool, New York State Association of Independent Schools
- Newspaper: The Grytte
- Yearbook: The Grytte
- Website: browning.edu

The Browning School is a college preparatory school for boys located on the Upper East Side of Manhattan. Founded in 1888 by John A. Browning, the school is a member of the New York Interschool.

== History ==
The school was founded in 1888 by John A. Browning to instruct the Rockefeller brothers, including Percy and John D. Rockefeller. Arthur Jones succeeded Browning as headmaster in 1920, moved the school from West 55th Street to its present location on East 62nd Street, and expanded extracurricular activities. Jones retired in 1948; Lyman B. Tobin, a Browning teacher for more than 30 years, became the school's third headmaster.

In 1952, upon Tobin's retirement, the school named teacher Charles W. Cook (class of 1938), as its fourth headmaster. Under his 36-year leadership, the Browning School expanded rapidly. After a lengthy fundraising drive, the school bought the adjoining carriage house and rebuilt it, and the new building opened in 1960. The school's expansion continued in 1967, with the building of a larger gymnasium on the roof and, in the late 1970s, with the acquisition of an interest in the building next door.

In 1988, Stephen M. Clement, III became Browning's fifth headmaster and served a tenure of 28 years. John M. Botti was appointed head of school in 2016. And currently still is.

Serving over 400 students, the school has more than doubled its size over 50 years. A new library, four new science laboratories, two new art studios, and additional classrooms were built in 2013. In 2022, the school announced renovation plans to expand its upper school, renovating a former parking garage to house its new high school grades at 337 East 64th Street, a few blocks northeast from the main campus building. This renovation finished in the 2025-26 school year, a massive change for middle, lower, and upper school, but also for the school's history up-front.

In 2021 Browning began publishing Buzzwords, a new digital magazine, designed to tell the school's story in a fresh and compelling way. Browning is a part of the Interschool. Per tradition, the school year commences and closes with an assembly in Christ Church United Methodist.

== Admissions ==
Browning has a highly selective admissions process. There are approximately 25-34 boys per grade at the school, averaging about 32 per grade with a student-teacher ratio of 6:1. A financial aid program ensures that the boys remain heterogeneous; as with many of its peer NYC schools. The school is private, functioning under a New York City non-profit statute enacted in the 1940s. The school is governed by a board of trustees and administered by a head of school.

== Academics ==
The school is divided into three schools that serve boys from kindergarten through 12th grade. It has a rigorous academic curriculum, with the majority of graduates going onto enroll in college.

=== Lower School ===
Lower and Middle School (2026)

The Lower School consists of kindergarten through fourth grades and is located at the 52 E 62nd Street location. Curriculum includes:

- Language Arts (Reading, Writing)
- Social Studies (Geography, Humanities, History)
- Mathematics (Arithmetic, Math in Focus, Singapore Math)
- Science (Physical Science, Biology, Planetary Science)
- Modern languages (French, Spanish)

Specialty classes include:

- Visual Arts (Drawing, Painting, Sculpture, Media)
- Music (Rhythm, Music Theory, Singing and Instruments)
- Library (Literacy and Research Skills)
- Computer Science and Engineering (Robotics, Coding, Digital Safety)
- Health and Wellness
- Physical Education
- Chess

=== Middle School ===
The Middle school consists of fifth through 8th grades and is located at the 52 E 62nd Street location along with the Lower School. Middle school curriculum expands upon the foundations from the Lower School:

- English (Literature, Reading, Writing)
- History (Ancient World, Atlantic World, American History)
- Mathematics (Arithmetic, Algebra I)
- Science (Earth Science, Biology, Physics, Chemistry)
- World Languages (French, Spanish, Latin)

Specialty classes include:

- Fine Arts (Drawing, Painting, Sculpture, Media)
- Computer Science and Engineering (Robotics, Design, Engineering)
- Physical Education
- Health and Wellness
- Modern Masculinities, which is also a part of The Browning School's Speaker Series.

=== Upper School ===
The Upper School consists of high school, 9th-12th grades. It is ranked as one of the top ten high schools for boys in the United States. In 2024, the Upper School will open a newly constructed facility at 337 E 64th Street. The campus expansion houses 13 new classrooms, four stories of offices, a library, cafeteria, gymnasium, and green roof and rear yard.

Upper-level curriculum consists of:

- English (Creative Writing, World Literature, American Literature)
- History (European, United States, World History)
- Mathematics (Geometry, Algebra, Calculus, Data Science)
- Science (Biology, Chemistry, Physics)
- World Languages (Latin, French, Mandarin, Spanish, Greek).

Curriculum also includes specialty classes:

- Fine Arts (Music, Studio art, Drama, Public Speaking),
- Computer Science and Engineering (Computer Engineering, Data Science)
- Health and Wellness (Health, Modern Masculinities)
- Peer Leadership (12th grade students advising 9th grade students)
- Social Impact (Community Involvement)
  - Browning Senior Class partners with Grassroots Grocery
  - The Browning School partners with Daniel's Music Foundation
- Physical Education (either in-school PE classes or interscholastic team athletics).
- Seniors also participate in a Senior Project.

The Upper School also offers a signature program called Certificates of Distinction to students who pursue specific independent projects in one of four disciplines: engineering, data science, humanities, and fine arts. In April 2024, A Browning high school student created an AI algorithm that improved EMS accuracy in predicting what assistance 911 callers need.

Graduates of the school often consider or enroll at various Ivy League and higher ed institutions.

== Athletics ==
Browning teams compete in interscholastic soccer, cross country, basketball, squash, baseball, tennis, table tennis, golf, and track. Interscholastic team sports are open to students in Grades Six through Grade Twelve in good academic standing. Interscholastic competition in basketball begins at Grade Six. There are also intramural opportunities at Browning in the fall, winter, and spring.

In anticipation of the fall and spring seasons, coaches provide preseason training to support boys in the honing of their game skills. Fall preseason camp takes place in the Berkshires at the end of August, and the spring camp is over break in Florida. The athletic department makes use of both facilities at school and those of New York City. The soccer and baseball teams practice at fields on Randall's Island. The track team makes use of Randall's Island and Central Park.At the new location on 64th street the school recently built a new gym where the basketball practices and games take place. The tennis team practices and plays a number of its matches at the National Tennis Center, home of the U.S. Open, in Flushing, Queens as well as The West Side Tennis Club in Forest Hills. Golf team practices are held at the driving ranges on Randall's Island and Chelsea Piers; matches are held at Mosholu.

== Notable alumni ==
- John D. Rockefeller Jr., financier and philanthropist, son of John Davison Rockefeller Sr.
- Percy Avery Rockefeller, businessman, son of William Avery Rockefeller Jr.
- Everett Colby, banker and politician, member of the New Jersey Assembly and New Jersey Senate
- Harold Fowler McCormick, businessman, son of Cyrus Hall McCormick
- Ogden Mills Reid, President of the New York Herald Tribune
- Christian A. Herter, diplomat and politician, 59th Governor of Massachusetts, Secretary of State
- Frederic R. Coudert Jr., member of the New York State Senate and United States Congress
- Thomas Quinn Curtiss, historian, writer, and theatre critic
- Orme Wilson Jr., diplomat, member of the Astor family
- W. Warren Barbour, businessman, politician, United States Senator
- Whitman Knapp, United States District Judge
- R. Sargent Shriver, diplomat and politician, creator of the Peace Corps, member of the Kennedy family
- Claiborne Pell, U.S. Senator from Rhode Island, son of Herbert Pell
- Thomas Hedley Reynolds, historian, President of Bates College
- Osborn Elliott, editor of Newsweek
- Jock Elliott Jr, Chairman of Ogilvy & Mather
- Arthur MacArthur IV, son of Douglas MacArthur and Jean MacArthur, grandson of Arthur MacArthur Jr.
- Thomas E. Lovejoy, ecologist, Senior Fellow at the United Nations Foundation
- Jeff Moss, composer, son of Arnold Moss
- Richard Ballantine, composer, son of Ian Ballantine of Ballantine Books
- Linton Wells II, Deputy Assistant Secretary of Defense under Presidents Bill Clinton and George Bush
- Thomas Oliphant, journalist, correspondent and columnist at The Boston Globe
- Andrew Lack, chairman of NBC and MSNBC
- Howard Dean, 79th Governor of Vermont, Chair of the Democratic National Committee
- Winthrop P. Rockefeller, Lieutenant Governor of Arkansas, member of the Rockefeller family
- Arthur Ochs Sulzberger Jr., Chairman of The New York Times Company, publisher of The New York Times
- Jamie Dimon, Chairman and Chief executive officer of JPMorgan Chase
- Sam Morril, comedian, actor, writer, and producer

== Affiliated organizations ==
- New York State Association of Independent Schools
- New York Interschool Association, Inc.
- International Boys' Schools Coalition (founding member & current member)
- Independent Schools Admissions Association of Greater New York
