= 1st New Mexico Volunteer Infantry, Reorganized =

1st New Mexico Volunteer Infantry, Reorganized was a New Mexico Territory Volunteer Regiment of the Union Army.

The 1st New Mexico Volunteer Infantry, Reorganized was organized on October 1, 1863, under the command of U. S. Army Major, Henry Raymond Selden, promoted colonel of New Mexico Volunteers. Colonel Selden, died at Fort Union, aged 44, on February 2, 1865. He was succeeded by Lieutenant Colonel Francisco P. Abreu on February 4, 1865, who was subsequently promoted Colonel of the regiment before February 28, 1865.

The regiment was attached to the Department of New Mexico and on garrison duty by detachments at Fort Union, Fort Selden, Fort Craig, Fort Bowie, Fort Cummings, Fort McRae, Fort Goodwin and other points in that department during its entire term of service. Company “K” garrisoned Fort Lyon, Colorado, from September, 1864, to February, 1865.

== Operations ==
- Expedition from Fort Craig, New Mexico Territory, to Fort Goodwin, Arizona Territory, May 16 to August 2, 1864, Company “I”.
- Expedition to Pinal Mountains, July 18 to August 17, 1864, Detachment Company “I”.
- Expedition to Pinal Creek, August 1 to 5, 1864.
- Expedition from Fort Craig to Fort Goodwin, Arizona Territory, October 1 to November 27, 1864.

The regiment was mustered out November 7, 1866 as its last units were replaced by units of the U. S. Army returning from the Union Army after the end of the American Civil War.

== See also ==
- List of New Mexico Territory Civil War units
