= Henry Selden =

Henry Selden may refer to:

- Henry R. Selden (1805–1885), American lawyer and politician
- Henry Raymond Selden (1821–1865), U.S. Army and Union Army officer
