= Arthur MacArthur IV =

Son of Douglas MacArthur (born 1938)

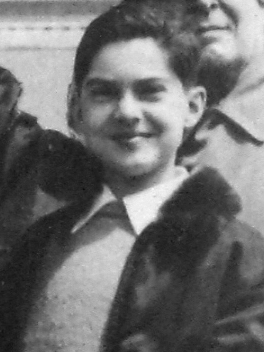
- MacArthur in 1950
- Born: February 21, 1938 (age 88); Manila, Commonwealth of the Philippines
- Other names: David Jordan
- Education: Browning School; Columbia College
- Parents: Douglas MacArthur (father); Jean MacArthur (mother)

Arthur MacArthur IV (born February 21, 1938) is an American concert pianist and writer, and the only child of General Douglas MacArthur and Jean MacArthur. He is also the grandson of General Arthur MacArthur Jr.

== Early life ==
Born in Manila while his father was serving as a civilian advisor to the military of the Commonwealth of the Philippines, Arthur MacArthur IV's early life was chronicled extensively in the press. His early childhood was spent around the penthouse built for his father atop the Manila Hotel. Arthur's father would play with him every morning before work. After the Japanese invasion of the Philippines, Arthur, his mother and his nanny were forced to relocate from the Manila Hotel as bombs fell nearby. They first joined Arthur's father on Corregidor Island and then were evacuated by PT boat and a Boeing B-17 Flying Fortress bomber to Brisbane, Australia. The United Press agency reported in March 1942 on the boy's escape with his family and that he was a "real MacArthur, a soldier like his father and grandfather". Life made Arthur their cover story in August 1942 and reported on such matters as the boy's life in Australia, his "curiously mixed-up accent", his kindergarten routine, and his new tricycle.

While the fighting was going on in the Philippines, Arthur and his mother left Brisbane on the refrigerator ship Columbia Express. They arrived in Manila on March 6, 1945, and were met by his father, who ferried out on a Higgins (or LCVP) boat, as there was no place for the ship to dock. Upon arriving in Manila, they discovered that their old penthouse at the Manila Hotel had been burned down by the Japanese, and thus they took up residence at "Casa Blanca," the house of Russian Jewish-born American businessman Emil Bachrach in Santa Mesa, which also happened to be the house used by General Tomoyuki Yamashita before he evacuated to Baguio with his Northern Force.

After the Japanese surrender in 1945, the family moved to Tokyo, from where the United Press agency reported in 1946 that eight-year-old Arthur MacArthur was considered a "musical prodigy". Arthur's first meeting with Emperor Hirohito's sons, the future Emperor Akihito and Prince Masahito in September 1949, at a swimming meet, was covered by Sir Keith Murdoch's Adelaide News under the headline "MacArthur's son and Jap. princes".

Even trivial childhood matters could find their way into the newspapers. When Arthur broke his arm ice skating in Tokyo in May 1947, the Australian Associated Press reported that “[d]octors said he behaved 'like a soldier'".

Not only doctors assumed that Arthur had the makings of a soldier. Perhaps inevitably, as he was the son and grandson of Army generals, it was assumed by soldiers, newspaper correspondents, and even by his mother that Arthur would be a soldier. At Arthur's christening his mother was asked whether Arthur would attend the United States Military Academy at West Point and replied "how can he help it, having such a father?" The troops on Corregidor called four-year-old Arthur "the Sergeant". Inevitably, Douglas MacArthur also wished for a military career for his son, writing "I hope that God will let me live to see the day that young Arthur MacArthur is sworn in on The Plain as a plebe at West Point".

== Arrival in the United States ==
Upon Douglas MacArthur's dismissal by President Truman, MacArthur flew home with his family on April 18, 1951. Arthur, then aged 13, had never been to the United States mainland.

The family's return to the United States brought intense media scrutiny of the General's son as well as the father. Douglas' selection as "Father of the Year" in June 1942 by the National Father's Day Committee, together with his reputation for being a particularly devoted father, drew attention to his only son. While newspapers' political correspondents focused on Douglas MacArthur's testimony before the Senate in Washington in May 1951, the general press sought out human interest stories connected to Arthur, his mother and his Chinese nanny, Ah Cheu. The New York Times ran a front-page story covering young MacArthur's first visit to a Major League Baseball game, as "guest of Horace Stoneham, owner of the Giants." Only two days later the Times ran another story (this time only on page 5) covering Arthur's first visit to a circus, the Ringling Bros. and Barnum & Bailey Circus at Madison Square Garden. The article was subheadlined "Two Notables Meet At The Garden" above the photo caption "The 13-year-old son of General of the Army Douglas MacArthur and Felix Adler, King of the clowns." The Waldorf-Astoria Hotel, where the family had taken up residence, was besieged by press and photographers. Scripps's Newspaper Enterprise Association syndicate reported that "Arthur is the object of staring eyes and photographers' flash-bulbs and reporters' questions."

The popular interest continued. In May 1951 the United Press syndicate ran a story reporting that young MacArthur was to receive a "100-year old peace pipe as a gift" from the people of Havre, Montana.

Not all the attention was flattering. The Associated Press reported the same year that Arthur MacArthur was "'Gifted,' But Gift Is Not Spelling." The article went on to quote his tutor saying that the "outstanding talent of 13-year-old Arthur MacArthur is a gift for music, but spelling is his weakness". Phillis Gibbons said that Arthur MacArthur "is just an ordinary American boy, like your son or mine. He is quite intelligent but he can't spell – what American boy can?"

Gibbons ("'Gibby', Tutor of Young Mac" according to a front-page headline in the Brooklyn Daily Eagle) was summoned from Tokyo to tutor Arthur for some time. Thereafter, Arthur attended New York's Browning School until he entered Columbia University as a freshman in 1956. The New York Times reported Arthur MacArthur's admission along with that of the son of MacKinlay Kantor, the Pulitzer Prize-winning author.

Interest in Arthur MacArthur was not limited to the press. Hope Cooke, a contemporary in New York who later became Queen of Sikkim, commented in her autobiography that "all the parents want[ed] their daughters to dance with Arthur MacArthur, the general's son... when he comes to church with his parents, there is always a huge crowd on the steps to watch them go by."

MacArthur graduated from Columbia University in 1961, having majored in English.^{,} The only non-prizewinning student mentioned by name in The New York Times was Arthur MacArthur. The New York Times pointed out that MacArthur's parents sat in the box of the president of the university, Grayson L. Kirk, with the General in full dress uniform.

== Later life ==
After graduation, MacArthur avoided the public spotlight. The United Press agency reported following his father's funeral in 1964 that, since graduating, "the tall handsome young man ... has made few public appearances." The Associated Press reported the same year that "MacArthur's Son Shuns Military Life" but pointed out that "his childhood had been filled with war." He works as a concert pianist and writer. He is also reportedly living under an assumed name.

Apparently, MacArthur lived in the Mayflower Hotel on New York's Upper West Side until 2004 when it was demolished. Forbes magazine tracked him down in 2005 but MacArthur "declined to be interviewed". During this time he went by the alias "David Jordan". When the Mayflower hotel was demolished he moved to Greenwich Village and bought a condominium a few blocks away from the hotel for $650,000. In 2014, MacArthur was featured in a New York Post article that discussed his long and secret residency in the hotel. Michael Gross's 2014 book, House of Outrageous Fortune: Fifteen Central Park West, the World's Most Powerful Address, also devoted a page to the mystery of MacArthur's life and assumed name. When Arthur moved out of the Mayflower Hotel he was described by lawyer Michael Grabow as one of four bachelors living there.

In 2024, upon the occasion of his father being awarded the Order of Military Merit (First Class) by the Republic of Korea, Arthur MacArthur issued his first public statement in at least six decades. A little over a year later, in February 2025, Arthur MacArthur issued a statement on the 80th anniversary of the Battle of Manila, fondly recalling the Philippines as "the land of my birth." In September 2025 during the 75th anniversary of the Incheon landing he made another statement mentioning "As a result of the Incheon Landing Operation, the Republic of Korea has become a shining beacon to all free people around the world today. I sincerely hope for eternal peace and prosperity."
