= USS Vixen (PY-4) =

Patrol vessel of the United States Navy

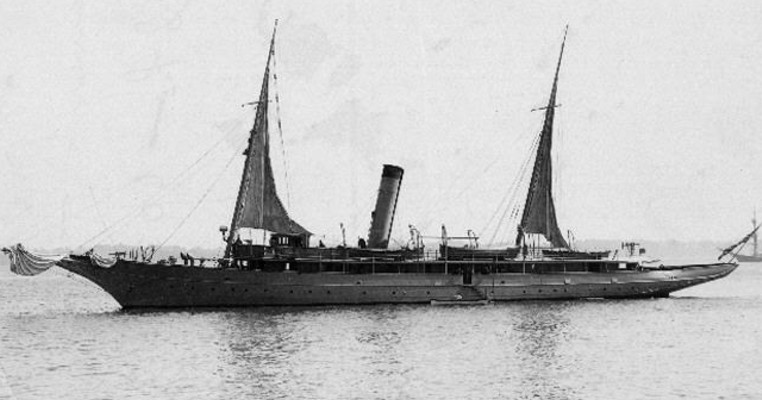
- USS Vixen, photographed in 1898, with sails hoisted on both masts.

History

United States
- Name: Vixen
- Namesake: Vixen
- Owner: Philadelphia, Pennsylvania, financier; Peter Arrell Brown Widener
- Builder: Lewis Nixon, Elizabethport, New Jersey
- Laid down: October 1895
- Launched: 4 March 1896
- Sponsored by: Eleanor Widner (granddaughter of owner)
- Acquired: 9 April 1898
- Commissioned: 11 April 1898 at the Philadelphia Navy Yard
- Recommissioned: 2 April 1917
- Decommissioned: 15 November 1922
- Stricken: 9 January 1923
- Fate: Sold on 22 June 1923

General characteristics
- Type: schooner-rigged, steam yacht
- Displacement: 806 long tons (819 t)
- Length: 182 ft 3 in
- Beam: 28 ft 0 in
- Draft: 12 ft 8 in (mean)
- Propulsion: steam engine and schooner sail
- Speed: 16.0 knots
- Complement: 5 officers and 74 enlisted
- Armament: four 6-pounder guns; two 1-pounder guns
- Armor: steel-hulled

USS Vixen (PY-4) was a yacht acquired by the U.S. Navy for operations in the Spanish–American War, where she served with distinction during the Battle of Santiago. She was commissioned again for duty during World War I when she was assigned to patrol the U.S. East Coast.

== Yacht Josephine ==
Josephine was a steel-hulled, schooner-rigged, steam yacht built at Crescent Shipyard, Elizabethport, New Jersey, by Lewis Nixon as hull number 16 for Philadelphia financier Peter Arrell Brown Widener. The first frame was raised in October, 1895 and the hull launched on 4 March 1896 with the owner's granddaughter, Ealonor Widner, christening the yacht. The completed yacht was delivered in June, 1896.

Two coal heated boilers provided steam to a triple expansion engine driving a single shaft. Coal capacity of 210 tons gave a design range of 6,000 miles (nm/statute not stated) without refueling. The yacht was supported by five boats, including a steam launch. Up to fifty 16 candle power incandescent lights and a search light were planned.

== Commissioned at the Philadelphia Navy Yard ==
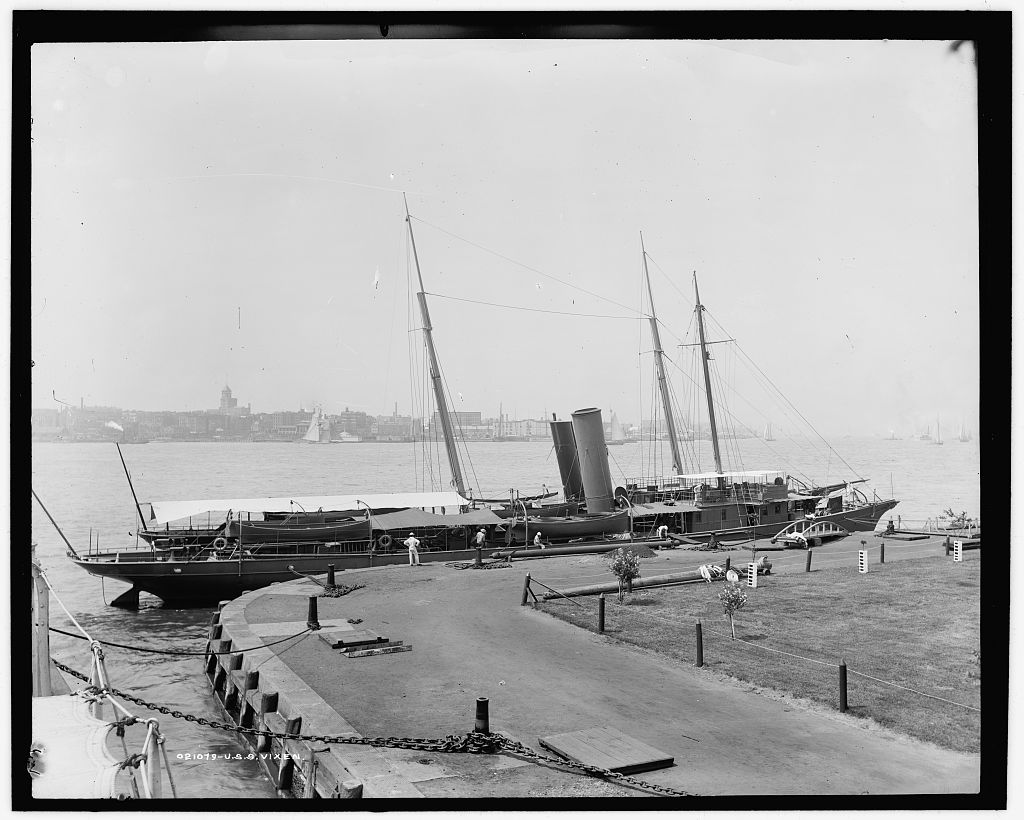
USS Vixen, circa unknown

The United States Navy purchased the yacht for $150,000 on 9 April 1898. Renamed Vixen, the erstwhile pleasure craft was armed and fitted out for naval service at the Philadelphia Navy Yard where she was commissioned on 11 April 1898.

== Spanish–American War service ==
=== A ship of many talents ===
Assigned to the North Atlantic Station, Vixen sailed for Cuban waters on 7 May and arrived off the coast of Cuba nine days later. For the duration of the "splendid little war", the graceful armed yacht performed a variety of duties, blockading and patrolling, carrying mail and flags of truce, ferrying prisoners, establishing communications with Cuban insurgents ashore, and landing reconnaissance parties. Among her passengers embarked during that time was Colonel (later President) Theodore Roosevelt, of the famous "Rough Riders". Also aboard during that time period was Midshipman, later Admiral, Thomas C. Hart. Arthur MacArthur III, General Douglas MacArthur's brother, served on Vixen during the Battle of Santiago.

=== The Battle of Santiago, Cuba ===
Between 13 and 17 June 1898, she took part in the bombardment of Santiago, Cuba, and, on 3 July 1898, took part in the Battle of Santiago.

On the latter occasion, the highlight of the ship's operations during the Spanish–American War, Vixen was patrolling off Santiago between 0935 and 0945 and was at a point some four miles to the westward of the distinctive landmark, the Morro Castle. At about 0940, a messenger reported to the captain, Lt. Sharp, that there had been an explosion inside the entrance to the harbor. Rushing on deck, Sharp almost immediately sighted the first Spanish vessel to sortie—the armored cruiser Vizcaya.

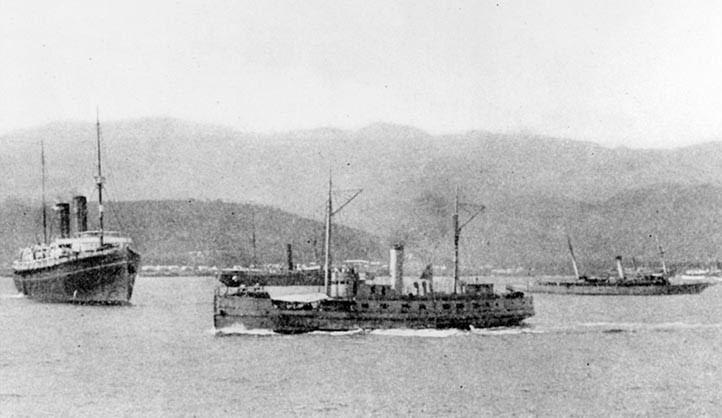
Photograph of USS Suwanee underway off Siboney, Cuba, during the Spanish–American War. Ships in the background include USS St. Louis (left) and USS Vixen (right).

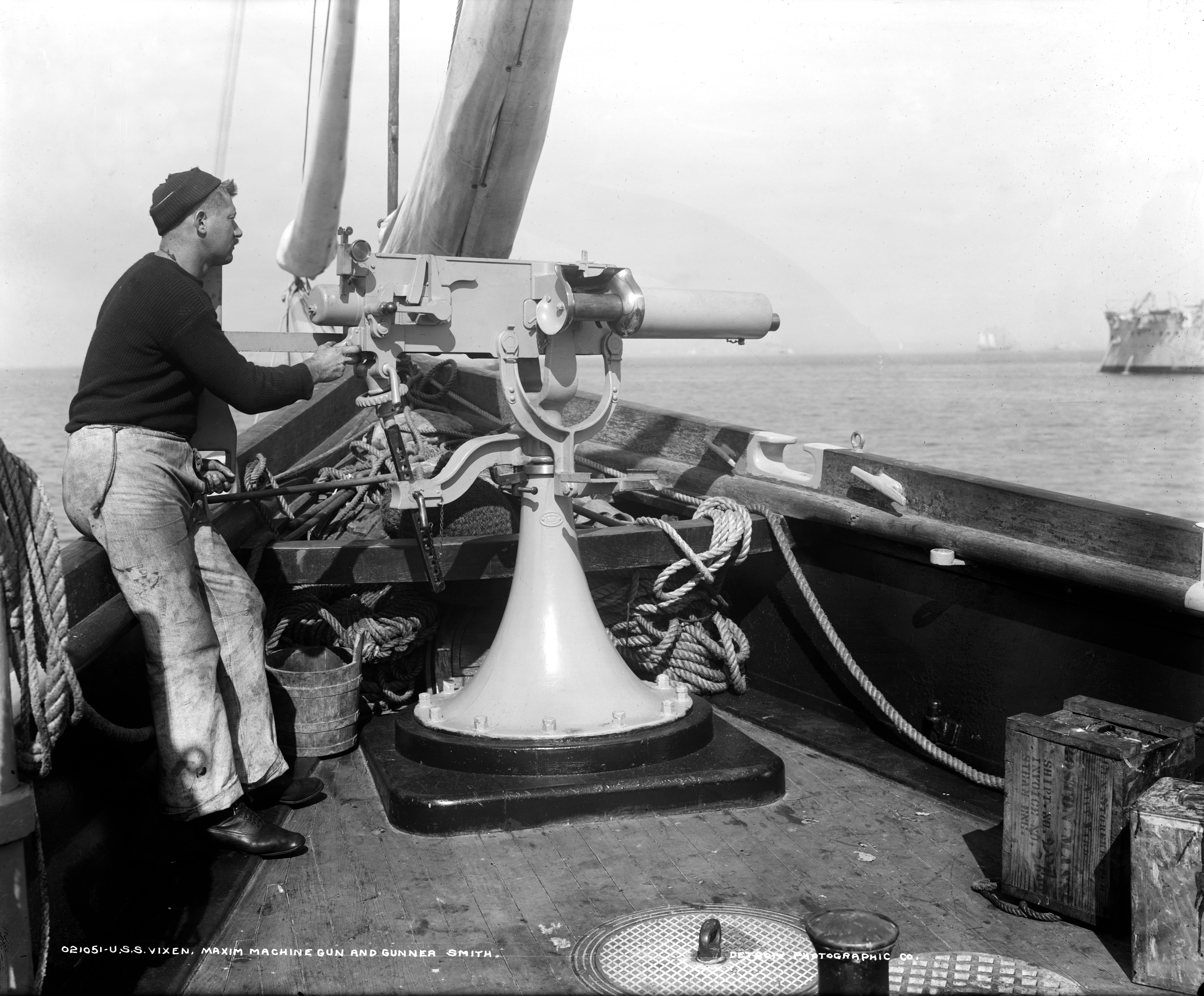
A large-bore Maxim on the USS Vixen c. 1898

=== Vizcaya fires on Vixen ===
Sharp ordered full speed ahead and hard-a-port, a move taken in the nick of time because shells from his own ships—alerted to the sortie of Admiral Cervera's fleet—splashed in the water astern in the yacht's frothing wake. Vizcaya acknowledged the presence of the yacht in the vicinity when she sent a salvo toward her with her starboard bow guns. Fortunately for Vixen, the shells passed overhead, "all being aimed too high."

As Vixen gathered speed, she steered south by east, clearing the armored cruiser Brooklyn's field of fire, about two points on Vixen's port bow. The yacht then steered west by south, as Sharp wanted to steer a course parallel to that of the Spanish fleet that was then under fire from the other American ships. Unfortunately, the helmsman erred and steered southwest by south—a mistake not discovered until Vixen had steered farther from the action.

Meanwhile, Brooklyn had engaged the leading ships of the Spanish fleet and was trading shell for shell in a spirited exchange of fire. Shells from Cristobal Colon passed over Brooklyn. One splashed "close ahead" and another splashed astern on the yacht's starboard beam. Several others passed directly overhead, a piece of bursting shell going through Vixen's battle flag at her mainmast.

=== Vixen fires on Vizcaya ===
Vixen witnessed the battle as it unfolded, but, as her commanding officer observed, ". . . seeing that the Spanish vessels were out of range of our guns while we were well within range of theirs, we reserved our fire." In fact, Vixen did not fire upon the enemy ships until 1105, when she opened fire on the badly battered Vizcaya, which had gone aground, listing heavily to port. Vixen's fire was short-lived for Vizcaya's flag came down at 1107, and Lt. Sharp ordered cease fire. The yacht remained underway to participate in the chase of the last remaining heavy unit of the Spanish fleet, Cristobal Colon, until that Spanish warship struck early in the afternoon.

After the conclusion of hostilities with Spain later that summer, Vixen returned to the United States, reaching Staten Island, New York, on 22 September. She then shifted southward to Norfolk, Virginia, arriving there on 19 October. Subsequently placed in reserve there on 18 January 1899, Vixen was recommissioned on 17 March, sailing for Key West, Florida, and the Caribbean on 21 May.

== Post-war service ==
For the next seven years, Vixen operated in waters off Puerto Rico, conducting surveys, carrying mail, stores, and passengers for the fleet, interspersing those miscellaneous duties with annual voyages to Norfolk for overhauls. During that time, she also briefly served as tender for Amphitrite (Monitor No. 2), the station ship at Guantanamo Bay, and later herself held the assignment of station ship there. Her diligent service was often rewarded with commendations for the excellence of her surveying activities. She often carried out her duties in completely uncharted waters and under a variety of weather conditions.

== World War I service ==
Decommissioned at Pensacola, Florida, on 30 March 1906, Vixen remained there until 6 December 1907, when she was turned over on loan to the New Jersey Naval Militia. Serving with that force until the American entry into World War I, Vixen was recommissioned on 2 April 1917. She patrolled off the eastern seaboard and, following the establishment of United States naval activities in the recently acquired Virgin Islands (purchased from Denmark), served as station ship at St. Thomas.

== Subsequent decommissioning and sale ==
During her tour at that West Indian port, Vixen was classified as a converted yacht, PY-4, on 17 July 1920. Ultimately decommissioned on 15 November 1922, Vixen was struck from the Navy list on 9 January 1923. She was subsequently sold on 22 June 1923 to the Fair Oaks Steamship Corp., of New York City.

== See also ==
- Arthur MacArthur III
