= 125th United States Colored Infantry Regiment =

- Active: 1865–1867
- Disbanded: December 20, 1867
- Country: United States
- Allegiance: Union
- Branch: United States Colored Troops
- Type: Infantry
- Role: Garrison and guard duties
- Size: 26 officers and 610 enlisted men
- Garrison/HQ: Louisville, Kentucky; various forts in New Mexico and Texas

Commanders
- First Commander: Colonel Charles D. Armstrong
- Last Commander: Colonel William R. Gerhart

The 125th United States Colored Infantry Regiment, (USCI) part of the United States Colored Troops (USCT), was an African-American unit formed during the final months of the American Civil War. Organized in Louisville, Kentucky, between February 12 and June 2, 1865, the regiment was the last of its type to be formed, thus not participating in active combat during the war itself. The regiment performed garrison and guard duties, initially around Louisville then in New Mexico. It was officially disbanded and paid off in Louisville on December 20, 1867, the last of the USCT units to be mustered out.

== History ==
During the Civil War, calls for African-American troops by President Abraham Lincoln and Frederick Douglass led to some 23,703 African Americans in the State of Kentucky enlisting into the Union Army, forming a variety of units, including the 125th USCI regiment. Mustered in Louisville, Kentucky, the unit was under the command of Colonel Charles D. Armstrong from 1865 until 1866, with Colonel William R. Gerhart succeeding him afterwards, leading the regiment until its disbandment in 1867.

After the Civil War ended, the 125th USCI regiment continued serving the Union, performing garrison duties in Louisville. In 1866, eight companies of the regiment were ordered to New Mexico Territory to replace white volunteer troops leaving service and protect settlers and travelers in the Rio Grande River region from potential bandit and Indian attacks. The unit, consisting of about 26 officers and 610 men, traveled by steamboat to Fort Leavenworth, Kansas, then marched along the Santa Fe Trail afterwards. They finally arrived in New Mexico by August 1866. During the journey, some soldiers mutinied in St. Louis upon learning of their destination, and a few deserted.

During service in New Mexico, the regiment was stationed at various forts, including Fort Bayard, which they founded on August 21, 1866; Fort Selden, where they were the first African-American troops to occupy the fort; and Fort Bliss in Texas. The unit continued its duties until October 1867, after which they were sent to Fort Riley, Kansas, to be mustered out. The regiment was officially disbanded and paid off in Louisville on December 20, 1867.

== See also ==
- List of United States Colored Troops Civil War units
- Louisville in the American Civil War
