= Milton Gross =

American sportswriter

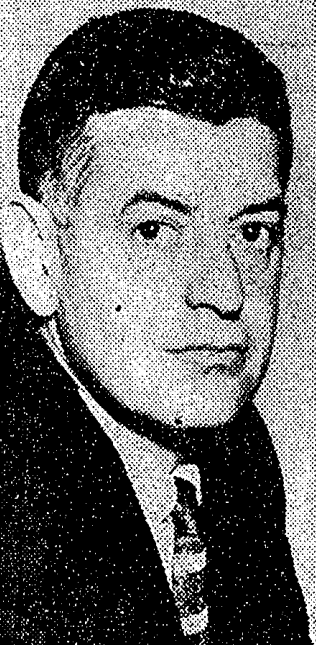
- Born: February 12, 1912; Brooklyn, New York, U.S.
- Died: May 9, 1973 (aged 61); Rockville Centre, New York, U.S.
- Education: Fordham University (B.A.), Columbia University (M.A.)
- Occupations: Sportswriter, Author
- Spouse: Estelle Murov (m. 1940)
- Children: Jane; Michael

Milton Gross (February 13, 1912 – May 9, 1973) was an American sportswriter and author best known for his nationally syndicated column in the New York Post.

Born in the Brownsville section of Brooklyn, New York, Gross attended Thomas Jefferson High School where he played basketball. He graduated with a bachelor's degree from Fordham University and then earned a master's degree in economics at Columbia University. In 1933, he became a newspaper reporter, beginning his career at The Brooklyn Daily Eagle, where he specialized in baseball, covering The Brooklyn Dodgers, the New York Giants and the Boston Red Sox.

In 1937, he moved to the New York Post and became a beat reporter covering the New York Yankees. After serving in the United States Army and the Coast Guard during World War Two, he returned to the Post, and also wrote freelance articles for the Saturday Evening Post, Collier's, Liberty, Sport, Sporting News and other national magazines. He wrote Yankee Doodles, a 1948 book about the baseball team. Gross began writing a nationally syndicated column for the Post in 1949, and it continued until his death. Additionally, he wrote an Eighteen Holes in My Head, a comic 1959 memoir about his attempts to master the game of golf, co-authored the heavyweight champion Floyd Patterson's autobiography, Victory Over Myself (1962), and continued to contribute articles to magazines like the Sports Illustrated.

Gross' final book, The House That Jack Built, was a biography of basketball player-turned-gambler Jack Molinas, the central figure in a 1961 college basketball point-shaving scandal. The book was completed but never released after Molinas exercised a right to stop its publication. Molinas was arrested and charged with interstate shipment of pornography in January 1973 and those charges were still pending when he was murdered in 1975 in what was thought to be a mob-related killing.

Gross and his wife Estelle (née Murov), a nurse, lived in Rockville Centre, New York on Long Island and had two children: a son named Michael, a journalist and author who writes about popular culture, and a daughter named Jane, who became a distinguished journalist for Newsday and ‘’The New York Times’’. Gross died due to agranulocytosis on May 9, 1973, and was survived by his wife and two children.
