= 15 Central Park West =

Residential skyscraper in Manhattan, New York

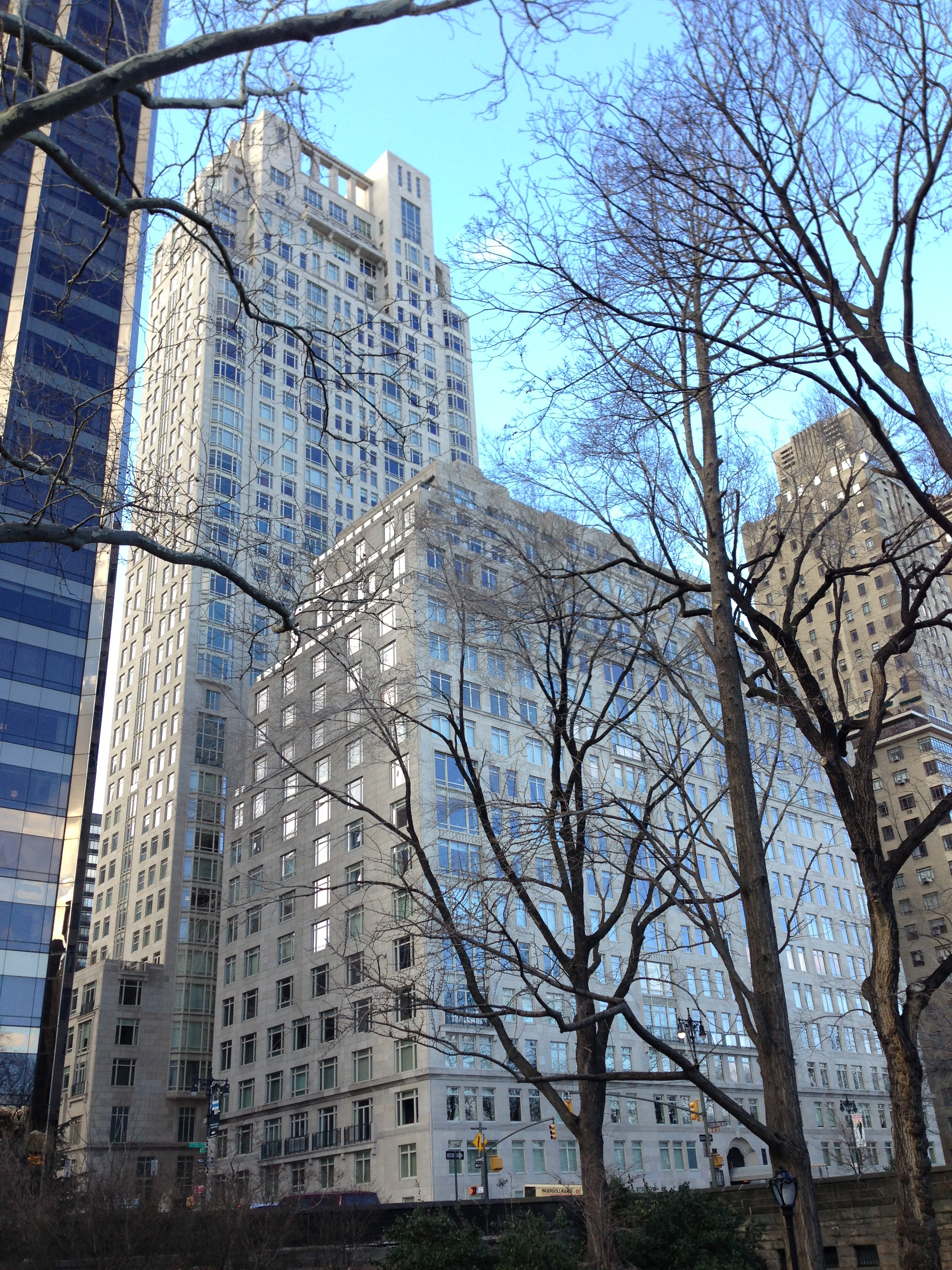
- View of 15 Central Park West from Central Park, with the House in front and the Tower in back

General information
- Status: Completed
- Type: Residential condominiums
- Architectural style: New Classical
- Location: Upper West Side, Manhattan, 15 Central Park West, New York City, New York 10023, U.S.
- Coordinates: 40°46′11″N 73°58′52″W
- Construction started: 2005
- Completed: 2008
- Cost: $950 million (2008)

Height
- Roof: 550.01 ft (167.64 m) (The Tower); 230.97 ft (70.40 m) (The House)

Technical details
- Floor count: 35 (The Tower); 19 (The House)

Design and construction
- Architects: Robert A.M. Stern Architects and SLCE Architects
- Developer: Arthur Zeckendorf; William Zeckendorf

Other information
- Number of units: 202

15 Central Park West (also known as 15 CPW) is a luxury residential condominium along Central Park West, between 61st and 62nd Streets adjacent to Central Park, on the Upper West Side of Manhattan in New York City, United States. It was constructed from 2005 to 2008 and was designed by Robert A.M. Stern Architects in the New Classical style. The building consists of two sections: "the House", a 19-story structure occupying the eastern part of the city block, and "the Tower", a 35-story structure occupying the western part of the block. It has approximately 200 apartments, of which two-thirds are in the Tower and one-third are in the House.

Both the House and the Tower contain several setbacks, complementing the design of older apartment buildings on Central Park West. The Tower rises above a retail podium, which faces west toward Broadway. The two sections are connected by an elliptical entrance pavilion, which abuts a cobblestone courtyard and a private garden. The facade of 15 Central Park West is made of Indiana limestone, with large window openings and metal balconies. The building's main entrance on Central Park West connects with two lobbies, one for each section of the building. Each unit has one to eight bedrooms, and there are also studio apartments for servants. The building also contains amenities such as a fitness center, wine cellar, and movie-screening room.

15 Central Park West was built on the sites of the Mayflower Hotel, which dated from 1926, and a vacant lot. In May 2004, a joint venture composed of Arthur and William Lie Zeckendorf, Whitehall Street International, and Global Holdings Inc. purchased the Mayflower and the vacant lot for $401 million. Robert A.M. Stern Architects was selected to design the building in August 2005, and construction began the next month, when the building's sales office opened. All apartments had been sold by early 2007, and the first tenants moved into the building in early 2008. Following 15 Central Park West's opening, many condominiums were sold at high prices. Its residents have included actors, athletes, CEOs, hedge fund managers, and entrepreneurs.

== Site ==
15 Central Park West is on the Upper West Side of Manhattan in New York City. The building's land lot occupies the entire trapezoidal city block between Central Park West to the east, 61st Street to the south, Broadway to the west, and 62nd Street to the north. The land lot has an area of 57,899 ft^{2} (5,379.0 m^{2}), with a frontage of 232.31 ft (70.81 m) along Central Park West and a depth of 346.64 ft (105.66 m). The building is adjacent to Central Park to the east, Trump International Hotel and Tower to the south, Park Loggia to the west, and the Century apartment building to the north.

The current condominium building replaced the Mayflower Hotel at 15 Central Park West, as well as a vacant lot. The Mayflower, on the eastern part of the site, had been designed by Emery Roth in the Neo-Renaissance style. The hotel, originally known as the Mayflower-Plymouth, was completed in 1926 and contained 365 rooms across 18 stories. The vacant lot contained several buildings until the 1970s; the wealthy Goulandris family of Greece acquired the Mayflower and all other buildings on the block from 1973 to 1978. The Mayflower had been built with ornate terracotta ornamentation, which was removed in 1982. All buildings on the western part of the site had been razed by 1987. Several developers unsuccessfully offered to buy the site, which was valued at $300 million by 2001. By then, several luxury residential buildings and hotels had been developed around Columbus Circle, three blocks to the south.

== Architecture ==
15 Central Park West (also known as 15 CPW) was designed in a New Classical style by Robert A.M. Stern Architects. It was developed by a joint venture of Arthur and William Lie Zeckendorf, grandsons of real estate developer William Zeckendorf; Whitehall Street International, a subsidiary of Goldman Sachs; and Global Holdings, a company headed by Eyal Ofer. 15 Central Park West is divided into two sections: the 19-story House on Central Park West and the 35-story Tower on Broadway. Because some floor numbers are skipped, the House's highest story is numbered 20, while the Tower's highest story is numbered 43.

=== Form ===
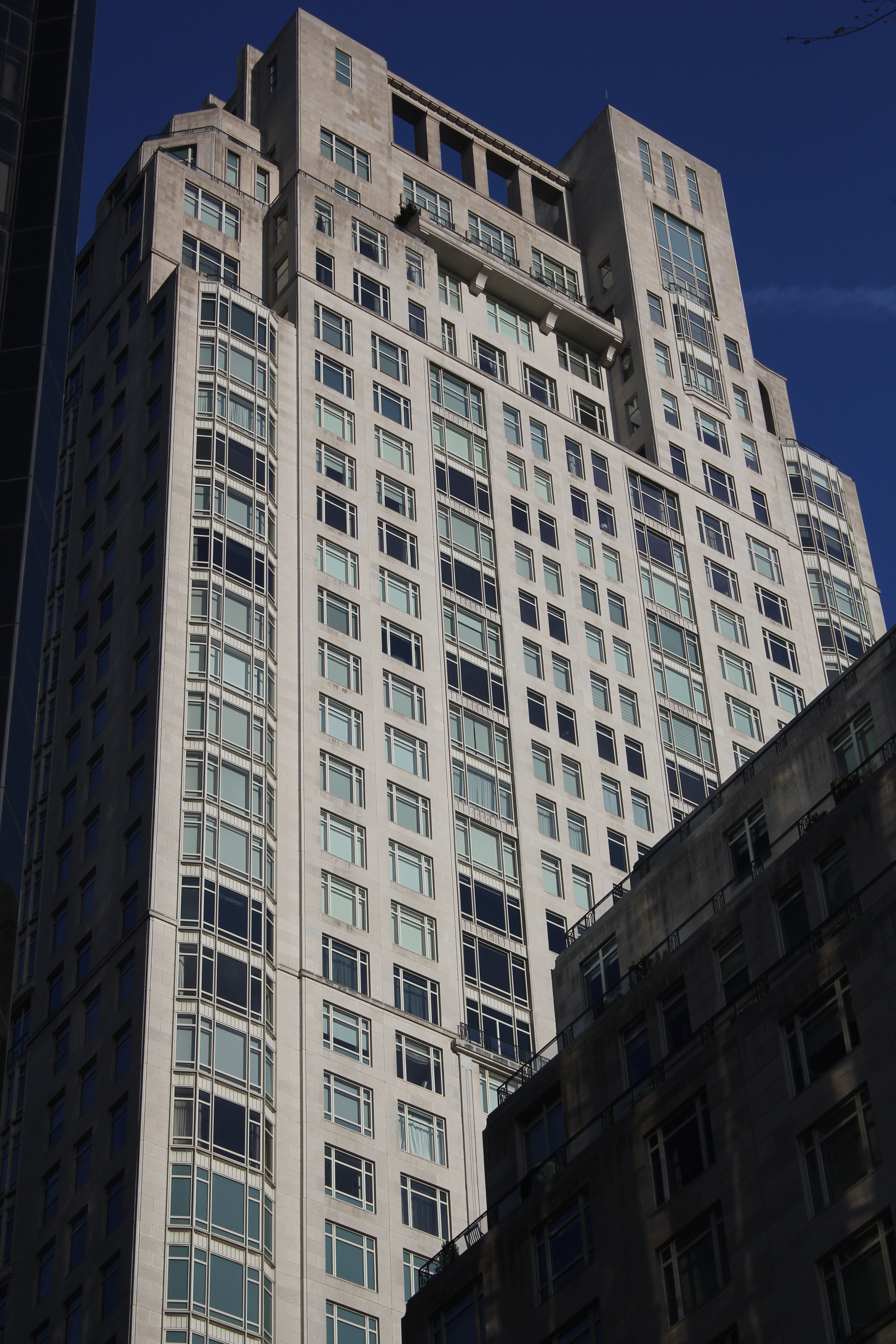
Asymmetrical massing of the Tower, with the House in the foreground

The House measures 231 ft (70 m) tall, while the Tower measures 550 ft (170 m) tall. The Tower rises from a ground-level retail podium, aligned with the diagonal axis of Broadway, though it was intended to blend in with other mid-rise buildings along Central Park West. According to Robert A.M. Stern Architects, the design complemented Central Park West's twin-towered developments: the Century, the Majestic, the San Remo, and the El Dorado. The two sections are connected by an elliptical entrance pavilion with a copper dome. The design of the entrance pavilion was inspired by that of the Sanssouci, a palace in the German city of Potsdam.

South of the entrance pavilion, accessed from a driveway on 61st Street, is a "motor court" paved in cobblestones. The motor court measures 70 by 200 ft (21 by 61 m) and is arranged around a black-granite fountain. The building's management discouraged chauffeurs from waiting in the motor court; many chauffeurs instead wait on a shoulder along Central Park West, which is designated as a no-parking zone. After the building opened, there were controversies over the fact that chauffeurs were using the shoulder illegally. There is also a private outdoor garden for tenants along 62nd Street, north of the entrance pavilion. The private garden contains a reflecting pool, which serves as a skylight above the swimming pool in the basement. The garden can also be arranged to accommodate additional seating for the building's dining room.

The penthouse apartments on the upper stories of both sections contain setbacks with terraces. The House includes symmetrical setbacks, while the Tower has a more complicated massing with asymmetrical setbacks. The southern elevation of the Tower contains multiple setbacks, allowing direct sunlight into these apartments. The Tower's northern elevation complements the Century and other high-rise buildings on Central Park West. The penthouse atop the House contains a terrace measuring 282 ft (86 m) long. The top of the Tower contains a crown, which consists of an open loggia.

=== Facade ===
The facade of 15 CPW is made of Indiana limestone, sourced from the same quarry as the Empire State Building. The developers and the architect had selected limestone because of its durability and because there were other limestone structures along Central Park West. There are 85,000 pieces of buff and gray limestone, collectively weighing over 6,000 short tons (5,400 long tons; 5,400 t). The facade is primarily clad with 2,832 limestone panels. There are also 80,000 pieces of ornamentation, of which 50,000 were designed specially for the building.

There are large windows, many of which contain small balconies. The windows were intended to appeal to buyers while also retaining the character of the limestone facades. Some of the windows are narrower than the others, indicating the internal arrangement of each apartment. The southern elevation of the Tower is visible from Columbus Circle two blocks away. The center of the Tower's southern elevation contains a vertical strip of bay windows, emphasizing the building's vertical dimension. On the Tower's western elevation, there is a deep indentation at the center of the facade, just above the retail podium on Broadway.

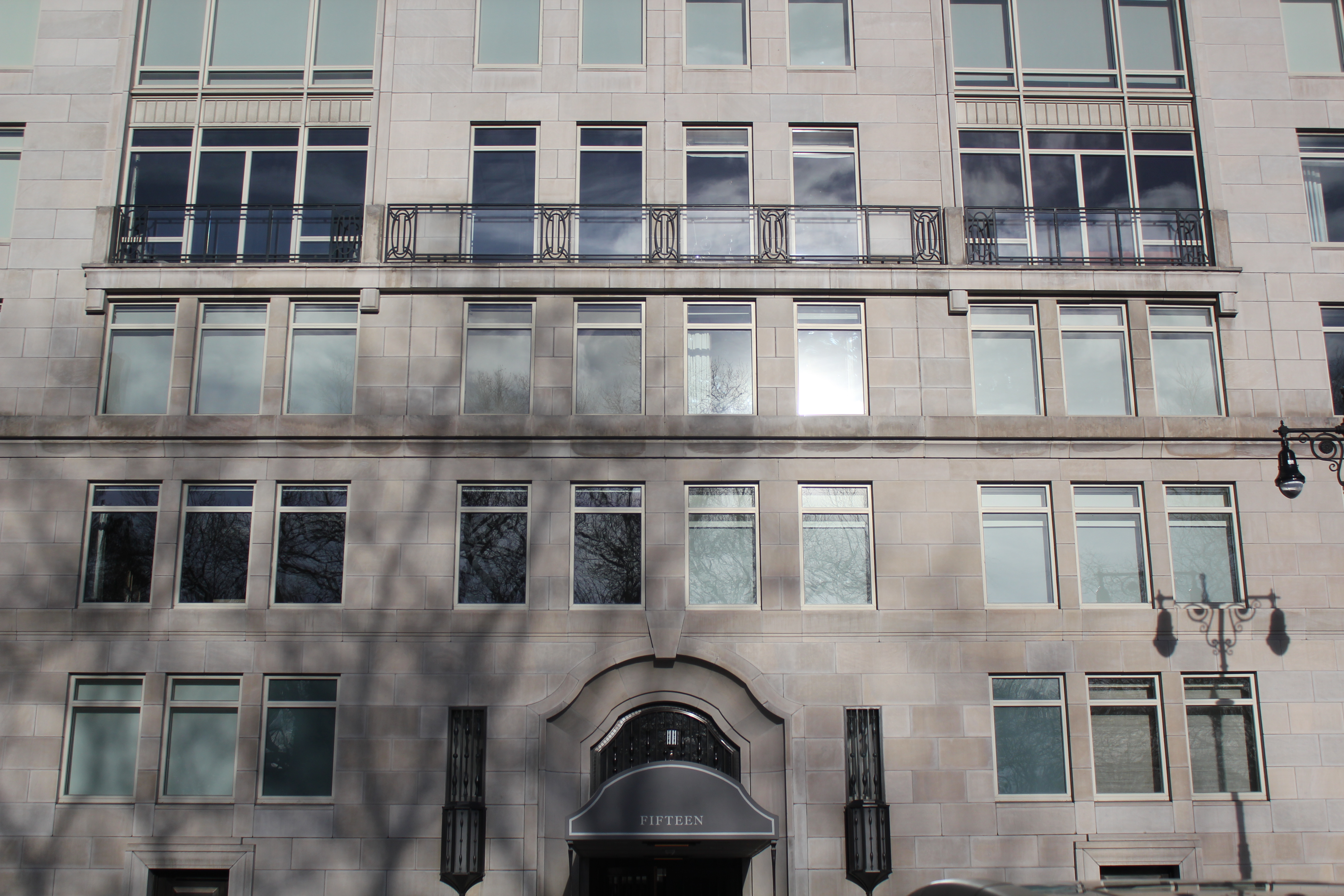
Main entrance to the House

The building's main entrance is through a curved limestone doorway on Central Park West, which contains a set of double doors topped by a transom. There are lighting sconces on either side of the entrance, above which are grilles. On the Broadway elevation of the Tower, the lowest two stories contain double-height storefronts. These large storefronts were required under zoning regulations.

=== Features ===
The building has a doorman, chef, and concierge service. There are two lobbies, both of which are staffed by concierges. The building has more than 50 employees. In 2009, these included six doormen, seven concierges, eight lobby attendants, eight porters, and twelve engineers. At any given time, there were fifteen staff members in the lobbies.

==== Lobbies ====
The House's lobby on Central Park West is designed in English oak with marble trim, as well as two fireplaces with elaborate mantels. The lobby contains an elliptical dome at its center, as well as four Sarrancolin marble columns carved from linenfold. Two groups of seating, arranged around the fireplaces, flank the main passageway through the lobby. Arthur Zeckendorf also commissioned two paintings, one above each fireplace, which depict Central Park in summer and winter. Next to the House's lobby is a private library and dining room for residents. The library is paneled in walnut, giving what Robert A.M. Stern Architects described as "an atmosphere of calm sophistication". The dining room is decorated with stucco veneziano walls and can fit 60 people. In 2012, it was one of three private restaurants at an apartment building in New York City.

A gallery connects the House with the Tower's lobby and the Tower's residences. The gallery is decorated with marble frames and mirrored panels. The Tower's lobby is underneath the elliptical entrance pavilion connecting the two sections of the building. It contains Sarrancolin-marble window frames, limestone walls with niches, as well as a monitor above the middle of the ceiling. The gallery also gave the Tower's residents the impression that they lived on Central Park West, since it had a direct view of the Central Park West entrance.

==== Apartments ====
The building contains either 201 or 202 apartments. The Tower contains about two-thirds of the apartments, while the other one-third are in the House. Each section has two elevator cores, which each originally served no more than two apartments per floor, although some apartments have since been combined. The arrangement of the elevator cores allows each apartment to have exposures on at least two elevations. Each unit has one to eight bedrooms. When the building opened, the average apartment covered 2,800 ft^{2} (260 m^{2}). Almost all rooms have an open view and layouts that borrow heavily from common 1920s and 1930s architectural styles, such as Art Deco. The secondary bedrooms of each apartment have a flexible layout and could be converted into another type of room, such as a study. The ceilings of the smaller apartments measure 10 ft (3.0 m) high, but many rooms have taller ceilings. Some of the penthouses have ceilings measuring up to 14 ft (4.3 m) high. Floor 9 (physically the sixth story) of the Tower contains four apartments, each with large terraces above the retail podium on Broadway.

In the original condominium offering, the largest residence covered 6,600 ft^{2} (610 m^{2}). This residence, on the 19th floor of the House, has an entrance hall with a skylight, as well as a three-sided terrace. Mica Ertegun redecorated the unit in materials such as mahogany, onyx, and plaster; the apartment's roof contains wind, moisture, and temperature sensors. Before the building opened, the Zeckendorfs combined two apartments to create a 10,500 ft^{2} (980 m^{2}) unit on floor 39 of the Tower (physically the 31st story). The eight-bedroom unit contains a library, a private screening room measuring 26 by 16 ft (7.9 by 4.9 m), and private yoga and massage rooms.

The lower levels also contain 27 or 29 studio apartments for tenants' live-in servants. These units originally cost $650,000 to $1.74 million, though they could only be purchased along with an apartment; some of these apartments were sold for more than $2 million. One such studio is apartment 6H, formerly owned by banker Sanford I. Weill, who sold it for $5.34 million in 2017. It contains a private bedroom, two closets, a bathroom with a tub, a kitchen with a bar, and a private terrace.

==== Amenities and retail ====
Some of the building's amenity spaces are below the courtyard. There is a 14,000 ft^{2} (1,300 m^{2}) fitness center. One amenity within the fitness center is a 75-foot (23 m) swimming pool, which can be divided into three lanes. Other fitness equipment was placed next to one end of the swimming pool. In addition, a whirlpool tub and a seating area were placed next to the swimming pool. According to William Lie Zeckendorf, the swimming pool was intended to attract potential tenants who would otherwise be hesitant to move there.

The basement contains a wine cellar with an octagonal wine-tasting area, another feature intended to attract potential residents. The wine-tasting area is surrounded by approximately 30 wine closets. These wine closets are sold individually to residents at prices ranging from $50,000 to $80,000. In addition, there is a studio for yoga and massages, as well as storage bins (which are also sold individually). Each of the 73 storage bins originally cost $35,000.

The lowest stories of the Tower contain four levels of retail space facing Broadway. The retail space spans 86,000 ft^{2} (8,000 m^{2}) across the ground story, the second story, and two basement levels. The three stories immediately above the retail space are numbered as floors 6 through 8. In addition to the servants' suites, they contain part of the amenity space. This section of the building includes a movie-screening room with 20 seats. There is also a billiards room, a computer room, and a conference space with two meeting rooms on floor 6.

== History ==
=== Development ===
==== Planning ====
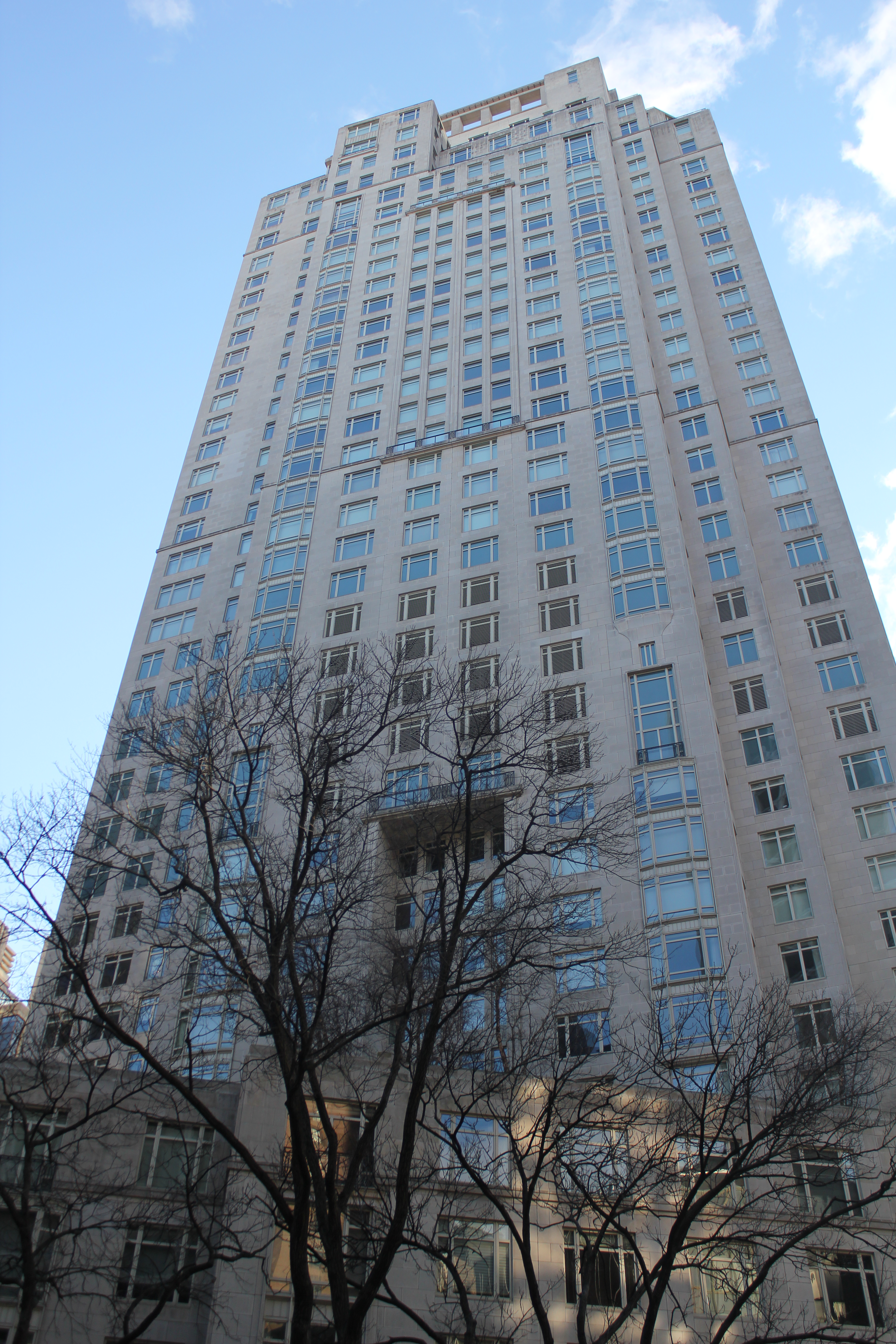
The Tower as seen from Broadway, rising above the podium

In May 2004, a joint venture composed of Arthur and William Lie Zeckendorf, Whitehall Street International, and Global Holdings purchased the Mayflower and the adjacent vacant lot for $401 million. Architectural critic Paul Goldberger described the assemblage as "the most expensive site in Manhattan". The developers had paid $690/ft^{2} ($7,400/m^{2}) for the land, more than twice the amount other developers had paid for comparable sites. The Mayflower closed in October 2004, and the Zeckendorfs sold the Mayflower's furnishings at auction. They expected to raise $1 million but only received about $200,000, a circumstance which W. L. Zeckendorf called "idiotic".

More problematic for the Zeckendorfs was that the Mayflower Hotel still had four residents who refused to move out of their rent-regulated apartments. All four residents had resided there for at least 30 years. They all lived in the hotel's north wing; if any of them refused to relocate, the Zeckendorfs planned to seal off and demolish the south wing first. Two of the tenants readily agreed to leave after receiving large amounts of compensation. The third resident was Arthur MacArthur IV, the reclusive son of General Douglas MacArthur, who had lived there in near-total anonymity since 1964. The final resident, Herbert Sukenik, refused to even negotiate with the developers until the other three residents had left. After an extended period of negotiations, the Zeckendorfs started demolishing the south wing in mid-2005, while Sukenik still lived in the north wing. Ultimately, Sukenik received $17 million and was allowed to live in the nearby Essex House for just $1 a month. This was quoted as the most costly tenant relocation in New York City history.

The Zeckendorfs agreed to build affordable housing in another part of the city in exchange for a 421-a tax exemption for 15 Central Park West, as well as 114,000 ft^{2} (10,600 m^{2}) in additional floor area. The joint venture initially did not divulge details of its plans, even as the site was being cleared. The Zeckendorfs invited six architecture firms to present proposals for the new building, although most of the respondents presented plans for modern, slab-like glass towers. Ultimately, the Zeckendorfs selected a proposal by Robert A.M. Stern Architects and SLCE Architects, which called for two limestone towers of different height. Stern later recalled that he had designed all of the details manually, without any computer assistance. Stern and SLCE presented details of the building's design to the local community in August 2005. At the time, the building was expected to cost $700 to $800/ft^{2} ($7,500 to $8,600/m^{2}), but the land was worth $2,500/ft^{2} ($27,000/m^{2}).

==== Construction and sales ====
Before starting construction, Arthur Zeckendorf conducted studies to determine which amenities to include in the building and which type of limestone to use for the facade. The building's sales office opened in September 2005, and construction work commenced the same month. Within two months, 74 of the units had been sold at a combined $650 million, including 12 of the penthouses. The building's sales agent, Richard Wallgren of the firm Brown Harris Stevens, told The New York Observer that tenants had signed contracts for apartments ranging from $2 million to $40 million. Because the building was a condominium development, its apartment prices tended to be higher than in housing cooperatives on the Upper West Side, which generally were more restrictive than condos.

The developers did not host any parties to promote the new building. Nonetheless, 15 CPW was popular, and sixty percent of the apartments had been sold by May 2006. At the time, the developers planned to start selling units on the lower stories in early 2007. Wallgren attributed the building's popularity to "careful pricing" and to promotional photos of the apartments. Sales were also driven by reports of numerous high-profile personalities who bought condos at the building, such as sportscaster Bob Costas, NASCAR driver Jeff Gordon, producer Norman Lear, actor Denzel Washington, musician Sting, and investment bankers Lloyd Blankfein and Sanford I. Weill. Total condominium sales at 15 CPW surpassed $1 billion after Washington bought a condo in June 2006, and the building's developers hosted a "Billion-Dollar Bash" to celebrate the event.

The building's two sections topped out during mid-2006. Nine months after the sales office opened, the developers had sold around 150 of the apartments for an aggregate of $1.2 billion. The average apartment had sold for $9.5 million (a rate of $3,300/ft^{2} ($36,000/m^{2})), although fourteen units sold for over $20 million. In October 2006, electronics retailer Best Buy leased about half of the retail podium for $75 million, representing one of the largest real estate transactions in Manhattan during that year. The last penthouse apartment was sold in December 2006. About 30 apartments remained unsold by the next month, leading William Lie Zeckendorf to say: "I wish we had 20 more to sell." All units had been sold by April 2007. The building contained the city's most expensive apartment at the time, a $45 million penthouse owned by hedge fund manager Daniel Och, though this record was quickly surpassed by an apartment at the Plaza Hotel.

=== Usage ===
==== Opening ====
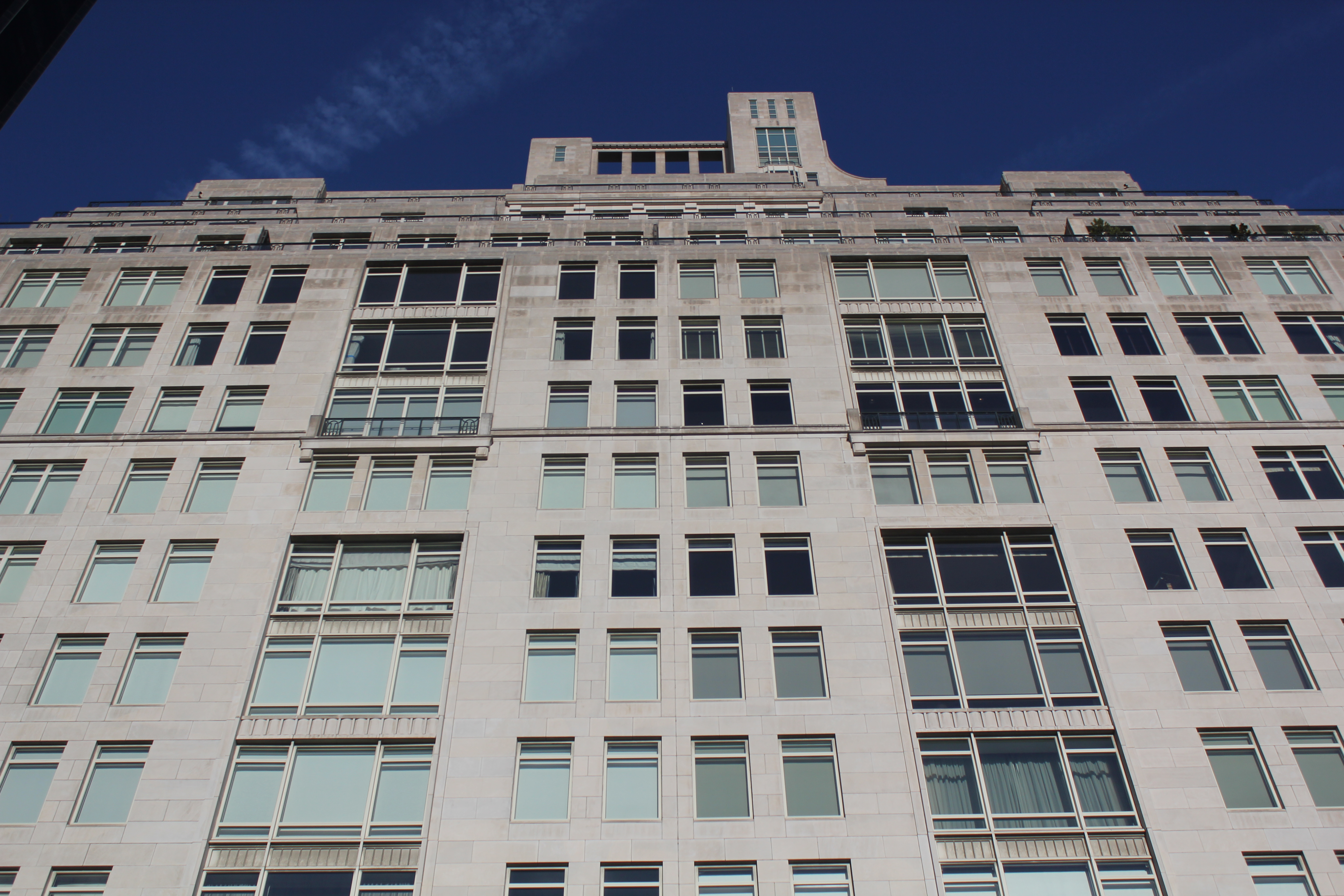
Facade of the House as viewed from ground level

15 CPW opened in August 2007. By the end of that year, a third of condo purchases had been finalized, though some tenants immediately sought to resell their condos. Several units were listed for $80 to $90 million, far more than what their owners had paid; at the time, the most expensive residence ever sold in New York City was a $53 million townhouse. One penthouse was so expensive that the brokers were not allowed to formally advertise it, though its tenant sought $100 million. Another unit, resold at $9,486/ft^{2} ($102,110/m^{2}), was the city's most expensive condominium per square foot. There was also demand for rental apartments at the building; in early 2008, a four-bedroom apartment (listed at $55,000 a month) was rented within three weeks of being listed. Vanity Fair described 15 CPW as "the highest-priced new apartment building in the history of New York". Though the real-estate market in general had slowed down due to the 2008 financial crisis, luxury condo sales at 15 CPW and the Plaza Hotel disproportionately impacted average apartment prices in Manhattan.

The first tenants moved into the building in early 2008, though the Zeckendorfs were still finishing the amenities by that May. Several tenants had resold their condos by June 2008, and Chase Bank and furniture store West Elm agreed to rent storefront space in the building's retail podium the next month. The first staff residence at the building was resold in late 2008. Asking prices for the building's condos had started to decline, amid a greater slowdown in the luxury real estate market. Even so, high-priced sales at 15 CPW continued through 2009, leading The New York Times to call it "a beacon of hope for the battered luxury real estate market in Manhattan".

==== 2010s to present ====
High-priced sales at 15 CPW continued in the 2010s. The New York Times wrote: "15 Central Park West has sustained its status as a real estate success story at a time when 'real estate' and 'success story' rarely appear in the same sentence." Although the building faced competition from newer Billionaires' Row developments like One57 by the early 2010s, William Lie Zeckendorf said he believed the building's units were underpriced. In late 2011, Russian oligarch Dmitry Rybolovlev paid $88 million for a penthouse apartment for his daughter Ekaterina Rybolovleva, making it the most expensive residence in New York City. The transaction encouraged developers of nearby buildings to raise their apartment prices, although it was surpassed by a sale at One57 not long afterward. In spite of these high-priced sales, the building's residents paid relatively low tax rates due to an old New York state law regarding tax valuations.

According to a 2017 report, apartments at 15 CPW generally were more expensive than at any other building in the city, even compared with Billionaires' Row developments such as 432 Park Avenue and One57. There had been eight sales at 15 CPW over a twelve-month period, with an average price of $6,045/ft^{2} ($65,070/m^{2}), compared to an average of $2,494/ft^{2} ($26,850/m^{2}) for the top hundred buildings. One of these was for a maid's residence, which had been sold for over $5 million. In October 2018, Madison Realty Capital placed a $27.7 million first mortgage loan on the building, allowing the owners of 15 CPW to refinance the building's existing debt. Best Buy closed its store within the building's retail podium in early 2023, putting the retail portion of the building in danger of foreclosure.

== Notable residents ==
According to journalist Michael Gross, many of the building's first residents came from BRICS countries, which had emerging markets, as well as countries with unstable governments. Another large group of residents were alternative investment entrepreneurs or financial executives. According to a 2013 Curbed article, fifteen of the building's residents were executives at a single investment bank, Goldman Sachs. Due to the large number of hedge fund managers who lived in the building, Gross referred to 15 CPW as a "hedgie hive"; he estimated that these residents managed a total of $437 billion. Residents also include those in the entertainment industry, including writers and actors. The building has been nicknamed the "Tower of Power" because of the large number of residents in the financial and entertainment industries.

Gross wrote that 15 CPW's residents also included "more traditional wealthy types" such as doctors, chief executives, and lawyers. Smaller apartments also attracted less wealthy residents such as a TV writer, a cartoonist, and small business owners. In contrast to buildings on the Upper East Side, 15 CPW had few "old money" residents. Furthermore, many residents used 15 CPW as a pied-à-terre, being occupied by their owners only occasionally, rather than as a primary residence.

Notable residents have included:

- Barbara Bradley Baekgaard, fashion designer
- Sara Blakely, entrepreneur; lived with Jesse Itzler
- Lloyd Blankfein, former Goldman Sachs CEO
- Chung Eui-sun, businessman
- Bob Costas, sportscaster
- Robert De Niro, actor
- Bob Diamond, former Barclays CEO
- Brian France, former NASCAR CEO
- Jeff Gordon, NASCAR driver
- Kelsey Grammer, actor
- Alan F. Horn, former Warner Bros. president
- Jesse Itzler, entrepreneur; lived with Sara Blakely
- Min Kao, entrepreneur
- Omid Kordestani, entrepreneur
- Norman Lear, television writer and producer
- Daniel Loeb, hedge fund manager
- Ranan Lurie, cartoonist
- Daniel Och, hedge fund manager
- Eyal Ofer, entrepreneur
- Idan Ofer, entrepreneur
- Sultan bin Muhammad Al-Qasimi, member of the United Arab Emirates' Supreme Council
- Alex Rodriguez, baseball player
- Lindsay Rosenwald, pharmaceutical investor
- Dmitry Rybolovlev, Russian oligarch; bought a unit for his daughter Ekaterina Rybolovleva
- Sting, musician
- Marcel Herrmann Telles, entrepreneur
- Mark Wahlberg, actor
- Denzel Washington, actor
- Sandy Weill, former Citigroup CEO
- Les Wexner, entrepreneur
- Jerry Yang, former Yahoo CEO

Both Zeckendorf brothers also bought units at the building. Though the condominium development's rules were less stringent than those of housing cooperatives, one broker described the buying process as "brutal, ludicrous, anal". Prospective buyers had to complete a 32-page application form, including an acknowledgement that they had "read and agreed to seven pages of single-spaced house rules". Residents could rent out their units for one year at a time, and the condominium board banned pets and smoking. Conversely, any resident who sold a condominium had to pay two months' worth of maintenance charges, which were then used to fund improvements to the building.

== Impact ==
=== Reception ===
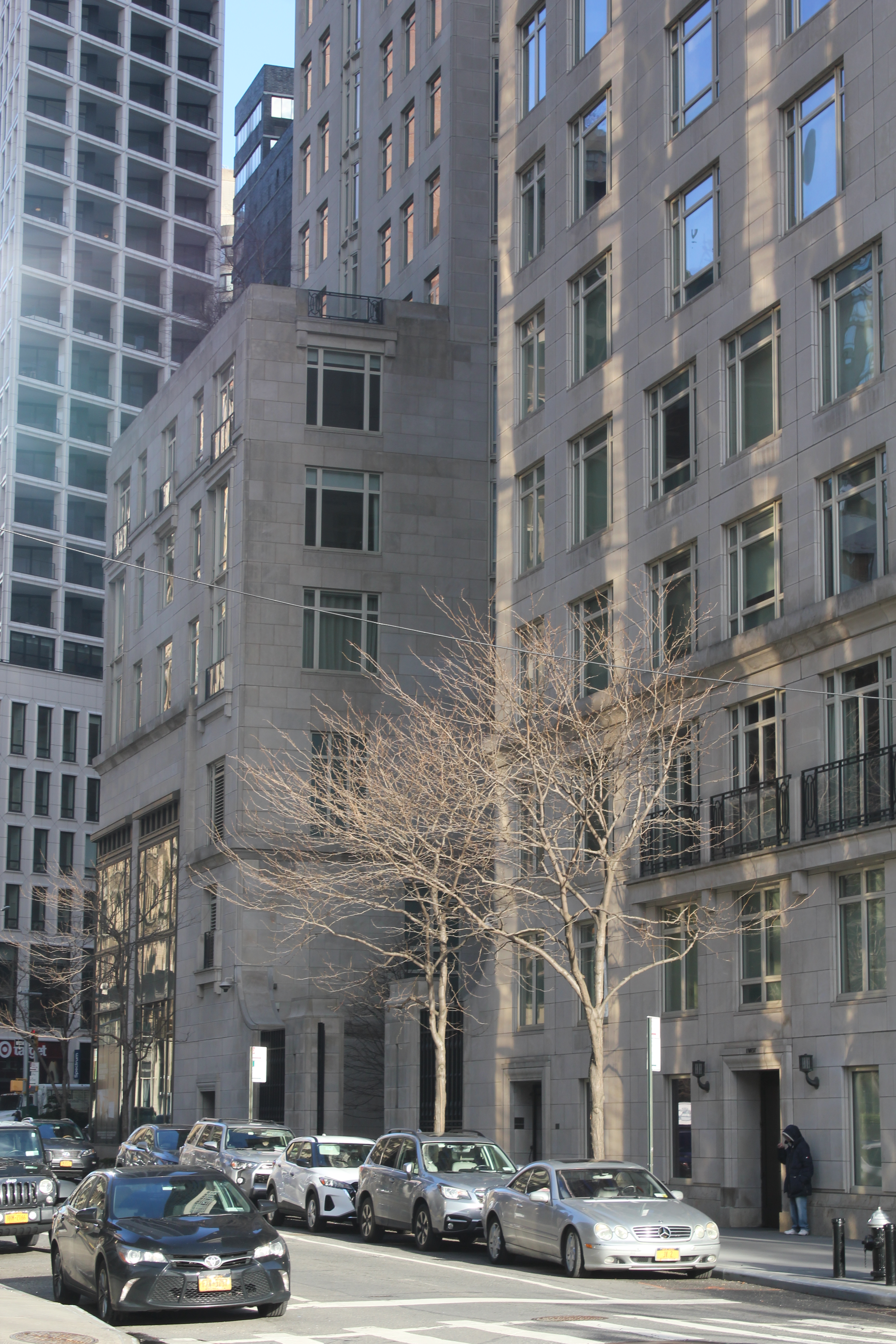
Westward view down 61st Street

When 15 CPW was completed, it received mixed criticism. The New Yorker architecture critic Paul Goldberger wrote that the building was designed to "echo" Central Park West's many notable late Art Deco buildings. Goldberger also compared the building to the great apartment houses of the 1920s, 778 Park Avenue, 834 Fifth Avenue, 1040 Fifth Avenue, and 740 Park Avenue. James Gardner of The New York Sun wrote: "Mr. Stern has applied a skillful sense of proportion and scale, not only between the two buildings in the project, but in the handling of the angular, pillared summit of the taller building, and the zigguratted terraces in the smaller building." Justin Davidson, writing for New York magazine in 2007, described the building as the city's "best new prewar" structure during that year. The New York Times said the building "pulls off the trick of appearing simultaneously new and as if it had always been there".

Conversely, the AIA Guide to New York City lamented Stern's "attempted re-incarnation" of the luxurious apartment buildings built on Central Park West between the two world wars. It criticized how "everything's exaggerated, retro and gigantic" and characterized the building as inferior to the Century just to the north. Many of the building's residents had made their wealth through intangible assets such as software, music, or hedge funds, leading Justin Davidson to say: "Stern does not claim to be an architect of great originality; instead, he has built the best knockoff money can buy."

The Master Architect Series described 15 CPW as having sometimes been ranked among New York's most prestigious residential addresses. Numerous commentators have described the building in various ways over the years. The Economist described it as the "Limestone Jesus", while S. Jhoanna Robledo wrote for New York magazine in 2010 that 15 CPW had surpassed 740 Park Avenue as New York City's "most glamorous apartment building". Michael Gross extensively described the building's history and residents in his book House of Outrageous Fortune, which was published in 2014. When Stern died in 2025, The New York Times called CPW "an unusual coupling of grandeur from the past and the clean lines of an ultramodern high-rise".

=== Influence on Stern's designs ===
Robert A.M. Stern Architects replicated 15 CPW's design at five other buildings in Manhattan. These buildings have included Four Seasons Hotel New York Downtown, in lower Manhattan, and 220 Central Park South, about three blocks away from 15 Central Park West. According to one real-estate commentator: "Developers keep hiring Stern in the hopes that he'll design something as successful as 15 Central Park West." The firm has also recreated 15 CPW's design in West Palm Beach, Florida. Stern's firm designed similar buildings as far away as the Chinese city of Xiamen, where Stern said he was hired specifically because of the success of 15 Central Park West.

== See also ==
- 520 Park Avenue
