= Michael Gross (journalist) =

American author, journalist and editor (born 1952)

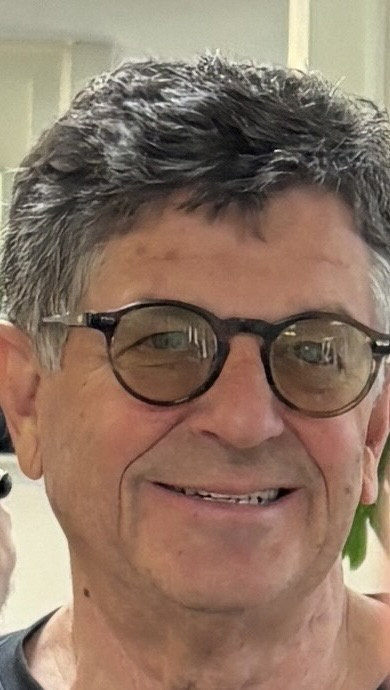
Michael Gross

Michael Robert Gross is an American author, journalist and editor whose work focuses on the American upper class. He writes a Substack called The Haves.

== Early life ==
Gross has an A.B. in History from Vassar College.

== Career ==
Early in his career, Michael Gross wrote about rock music for magazines. From 1973, his work appeared primarily in Crawdaddy!, the New Musical Express, Zoo World, Rock, Club, Circus and Swank. In addition to writing features for Circus magazine's sister publication, Circus Raves, during the mid 1970s, he served as editor-in-chief of Rock in 1976 and 1977. Gross was the editor of the Fire Island News, a weekly newspaper in a New York summer colony, in 1978. He then began covering fashion photography for Photo District News and subsequently wrote the column "Fashion Statements" for Manhattan, Inc., a short-lived business magazine. In 1985, he went to work for The New York Times, writing about fashion in feature stories and a weekly column, "Notes on Fashion". In 1988, he became a contributing editor of New York magazine, covering fashion and the world of the rich and famous.

In 2000, he was briefly a senior editor of George, a political magazine. In 2002, he wrote a gossip column, "The Word", for the New York Daily News. From 2002 until 2010, he edited the written content of Bergdorf Goodman Magazine. He worked for Crain's New York Business as a columnist from 2010 to 2012.

Gross was also the real estate editor and a monthly columnist for Avenue magazine, its editor-in-chief from October 2016 until March 2019, and a contributing editor of Travel and Leisure magazine from 1997 until 2014. In 2015, he was named a contributing editor of Departures. In addition to The New York Times and New York, he has written for Esquire, GQ, Vanity Fair, and Town & Country.

Gross is the author of the bestsellers Model: The Ugly Business of Beautiful Women and 740 Park: The Story of the World's Richest Apartment Building. He has also written books on the Baby Boom, the fashion designer Ralph Lauren, the Metropolitan Museum of Art and estates in Los Angeles. In 2014, Gross published a book on the luxury condominium building 15 Central Park West, with the title House of Outrageous Fortune. It reached number 20 on the New York Times Non-Fiction Best Seller list.

In July 2016, Gross published Focus: The Secret, Sexy, Sometimes Sordid World of Fashion Photographers through Simon & Schuster. In November 2023, Atlantic Monthly Press. published “Flight of the WASP: The Rise, Fall and Future of America’s Original Ruling Class,” about a dozen prominent Colonial American families over 400 years. The fourth book in his tetralogy of real estate-based social studies, Treasured Island on the exclusive French resort of St. Barth, will be published in 2026 by HarperCollins.

== Personal life ==
Gross is married to Barbara Hodes. His sister, the late Jane Gross, a reporter and bureau chief at The New York Times, and their father, Milton Gross, a syndicated sports columnist for the New York Post, were also authors.

== Works ==
- Treasured Island: The Story of St. Barth . . . and Its Barbarians, Billionaires, and Beauties (Harper, 2026)
- Flight of the WASP: The Rise, Fall, and Future of America’s Original Ruling Class, (Atlantic Monthly Press, 2023)
- Focus: The Sexy, Secret, Sometimes Sordid World of Fashion Photographers, Atria Books (Simon & Schuster, 2016)
- House of Outrageous Fortune, on 15 Central Park West, Atria Books (Simon & Schuster, 2014)
- Unreal Estate: Money, Ambition and the Lust for Land in Los Angeles (Broadway Books, 2011)
- Rogues' Gallery: The Secret Story of the Lust, Lies, Greed and Betrayals That Made the Metropolitan Museum of Art, the paperback edition of a book first published in hardcover with the subtitle The Secret History of the Moguls and the Money That Made the Metropolitan Museum, an unauthorized social history of the Metropolitan Museum of Art in New York City (Broadway Books, 2009).
- 740 Park: The Story of the World's Richest Apartment Building (Broadway Books, 2005)
- Genuine Authentic: The Real Life of Ralph Lauren (HarperCollins, 2002)
- My Generation: Fifty Years of Sex, Drugs, Rock, Revolution, Glamour, Greed, Valor, Faith and Silicon Chips (Cliff Street Books, 2000)
- Model: The Ugly Business of Beautiful Women (William Morrow, 1995).

== Film adaptations ==
- 740 Park inspired Park Avenue: Money, Power and the American Dream, the documentary directed by Alex Gibney that explores the theme of income inequality in the United States. The film was produced for the Why Poverty? documentary project aired on public television networks around the world in fall 2012.
