= Fort Selden =

United States historic place in New Mexico

- U.S. National Register of Historic Places
- New Mexico Historic Site
- NM State Register of Cultural Properties
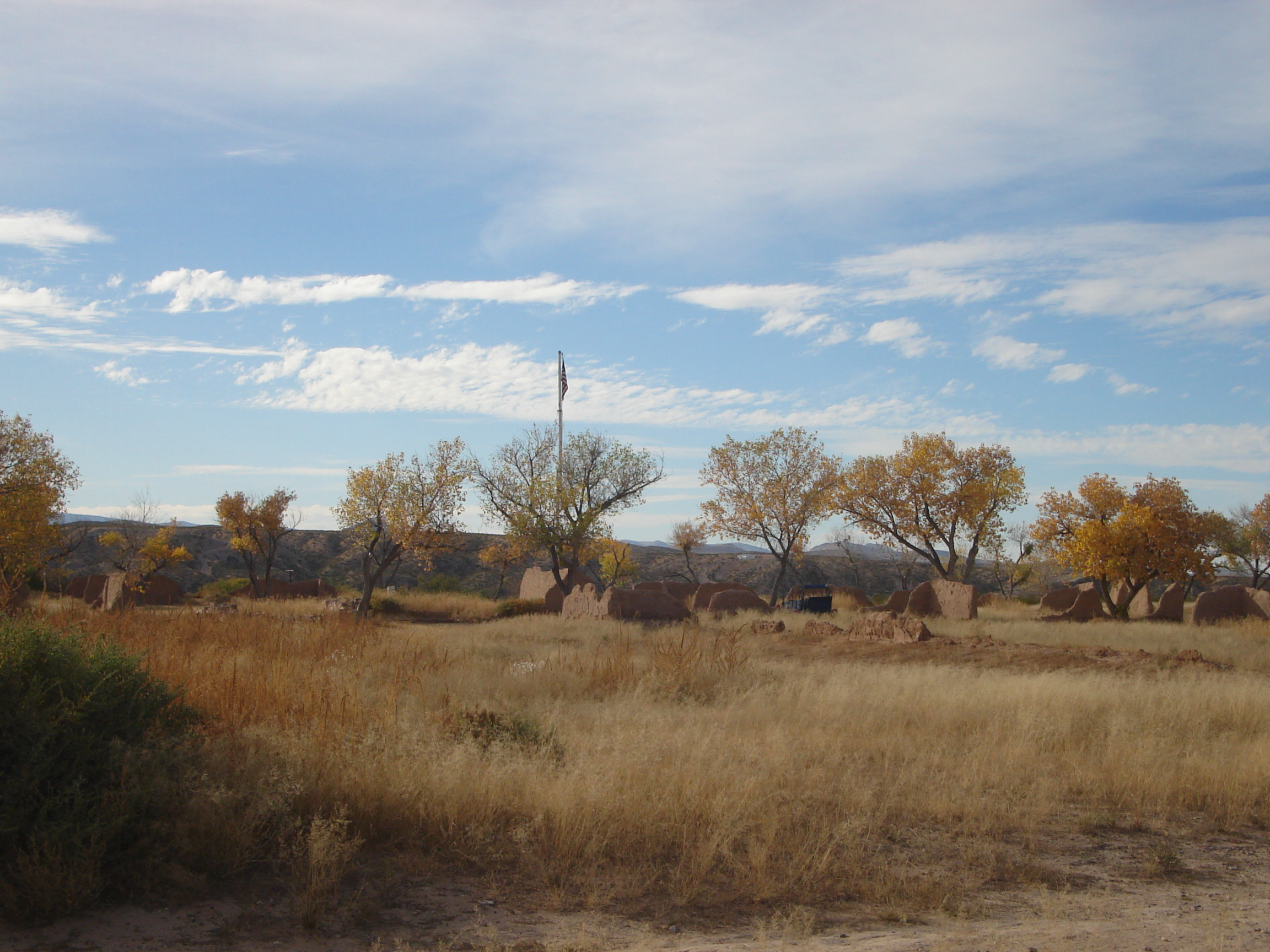
- Ruins of Fort Selden

- Location within New Mexico
- Nearest city: Las Cruces, New Mexico
- Coordinates: 32°29′45″N 106°55′30″W
- Area: 7 acres (2.8 ha)
- Built: 1865
- NRHP reference No.: 70000401
- NMSRCP No.: 47

Significant dates
- Added to NRHP: July 9, 1970
- Designated NMHS: 1974
- Designated NMSRCP: March 21, 1969

Fort Selden was a United States Army post, occupying the area in what is now Radium Springs, New Mexico. The site was long a campground along the El Camino Real de Tierra Adentro. It was the site of a Confederate Army camp in 1861. The U.S. Army established Fort Selden in 1865 for the purpose of protecting westward settlers from Native American raids, but the post fell into disrepair after the American Civil War. It was ultimately abandoned in 1891, due in large part to the decision to expand Fort Bliss and the lack of any expenditures for repair of the facility.

== History ==
=== Paraje de Robledo ===
For centuries the site of Fort Selden had been the Paraje de Robledo, a camp site along the course of the El Camino Real de Tierra Adentro on the east bank of the Rio Grande. The campground or paraje was named for an old Spanish soldier, Pedro Robledo, who died and was buried there on the 1598 expedition of Juan de Oñate. It became known as La Cruz de Robledo because of the cross originally marking his grave there. Later the name was shortened to Paraje Robledo.

Paraje Robledo was the last stop along the Rio Grande before the route of the Camino Real left the river to enter the Jornada del Muerto on the way north toward Santa Fe. By the time of the American Civil War, the Mesilla Valley around Las Cruces had developed a population base who valued the fertile land along the Rio Grande and were suffering from attacks by the Apache. Also, travelers along Camino Real that passed through the area were uneasy about moving further north on the Jornada del Muerto.

=== Camp Robledo ===
In 1861, the Confederate Army established a post, Camp Robledo, at the Paraje de Robledo to guard the approaches from the north to the Mesilla Valley of Confederate Arizona along the Rio Grande and across the Jornada del Muerto on the El Camino Real de Tierra Adentro. It was used as a base for cavalry patrols and operations against Fort Craig and other places in Union held New Mexico Territory.

=== Fort Selden ===
Fort Selden was located in Doña Ana County, 13 miles north of Las Cruces, New Mexico. It was established in 1865 at the Paraje de Robledo in an effort to bring peace among the varied inhabitants in the south central region of present-day New Mexico. It was named in honor of Col. Henry Raymond Selden who had served many years in New Mexico Territory before and during the American Civil War and had died of illness in Doña Ana County, and buried at Fort Union on February 2, 1865. The primary intent of the fort was to protect settlers and travelers in the Mesilla Valley from attacks by desperados and Mescalero Apache Indians. Built near the banks of the Rio Grande, the adobe fort housed units of the California Volunteer Cavalry, U.S. Army Infantry and Cavalry.

The first troops to occupy the fort were Company M 1st Regiment of Cavalry, California Volunteers from 31 July 1865 to 31 August 1866, and subsequently companies of the 125th US Colored Infantry Regiment, a group of African-American enlisted soldiers from Kentucky who had been mustered into the Union Army near the close of the American Civil War. Several of the units assigned later, including the 38th Infantry Regiment, 9th US Cavalry and 10th US Cavalry, all composed of black troopers, sometimes referred to as Buffalo Soldiers. As a testament to their bravery, nine Buffalo Soldiers received the Medal of Honor while serving in New Mexico Territory.

In 1884, Captain Arthur MacArthur Jr., 13th Infantry, was assigned as post commander. With him was his wife and two young sons, Arthur MacArthur III, age 7, and Douglas MacArthur, age 4. In his memoirs, MacArthur wrote that it was at Fort Selden that he and his brother "learned to ride and shoot, even before we learned to read and write." The MacArthurs spent two years at Fort Selden before Captain MacArthur was transferred to Fort Wingate.

By late 1886, the frontier had rapidly changed. Geronimo's surrender to Brigadier General Nelson A. Miles at Skeleton Canyon in Arizona ended the nation's long Indian Wars.

As a result, Army commander-in-chief, Lt. General William Tecumseh Sherman, ordered a consolidation of six military posts in southern New Mexico and eastern Arizona. He favored a giant, one-square-mile installation large enough to accommodate six troops of cavalry and six companies of infantry. Sherman further ordered that the permanent post be located near the junction of the Santa Fe Railroad and the Southern Pacific Railroad in southern New Mexico. For a time, Fort Selden was the leading candidate for the site of the new post, but because the railroads had brought spectacular growth to the El Paso, Texas area, Fort Bliss, was selected.

By 1890, criminals and raiding parties were no longer considered a threat as hostilities eventually lessened and the fort was no longer needed. Like many small forts in the American Southwest, the government decommissioned the fort and it was abandoned for the last time in 1891. On 20 January 1891, Lt. James Brett, commanding a small caretaker force, filed the final post return, which reported:

"All public property from this post having been disposed of, it was abandoned on this date."

== Fort Selden Historic Site ==
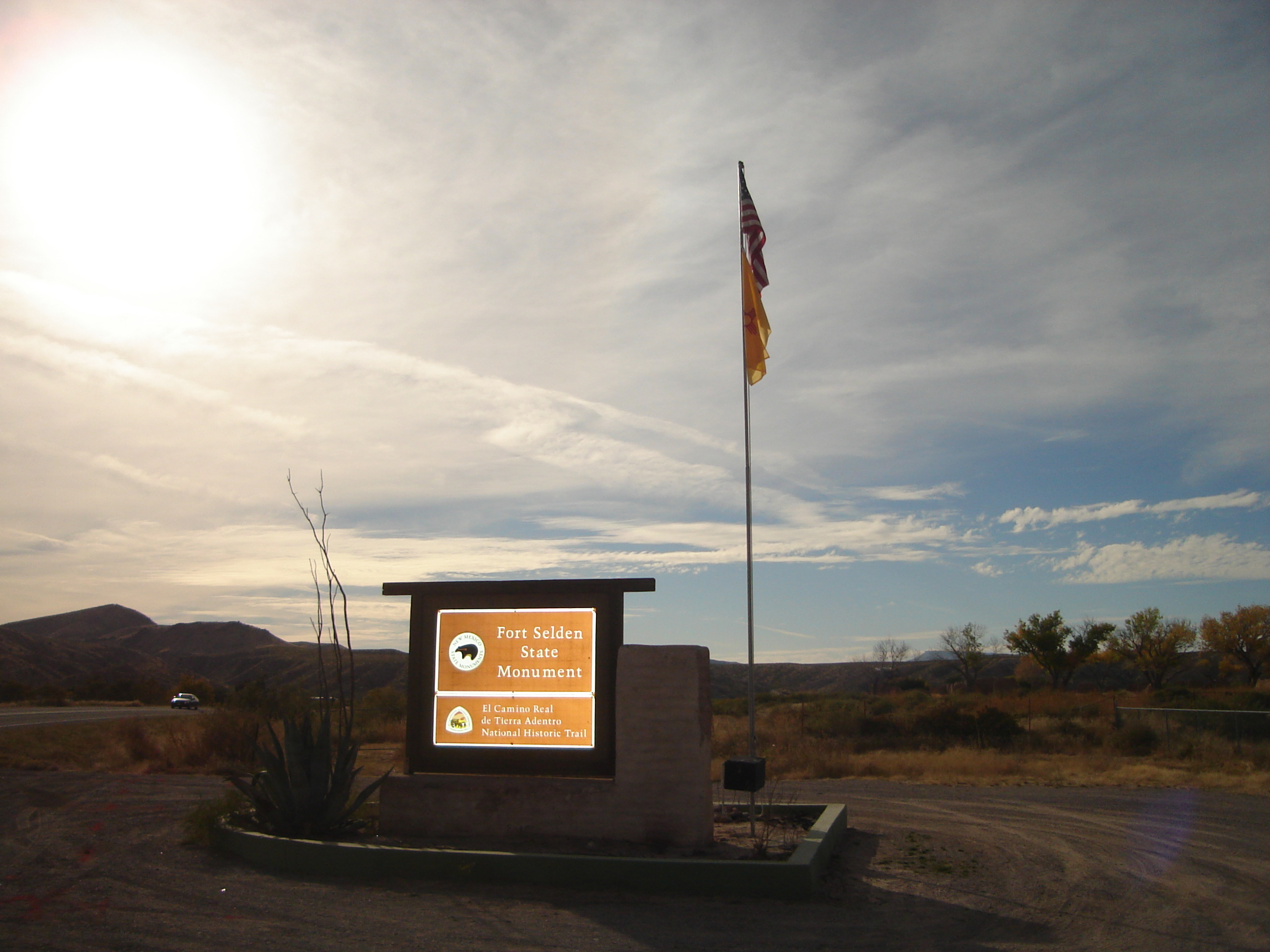

For decades, the ruins of Fort Selden were consumed by the ravages of rain, snow and wind. Vandals, souvenir hunters and treasure-seekers added to its demise. In 1963, the land encompassing Fort Selden was donated to the state by Harry N. Bailey, a longtime resident of the area. In 1970, the fort was listed on the National Register of Historic Places and in 1974, the fort was declared a New Mexico State Monument. It is overseen by the New Mexico Historic Sites (formerly State Monuments) Division of the New Mexico Department of Cultural Affairs.

The present day ruins are available for viewing via an interpretive trail. A visitor center offers exhibits on frontier and military life. Fort Selden Historic Site is located 13 miles (21 km) north of Las Cruces, New Mexico, off Exit 19 of Interstate 25, near Radium Springs, New Mexico.

== See also ==
- National Register of Historic Places listings in Doña Ana County, New Mexico
