= House of Outrageous Fortune =

2014 book by Michael Gross

House of Outrageous Fortune: Fifteen Central Park West, the World's Most Powerful Address
- Hardcover edition
- Author: Michael Gross
- Language: English
- Subject: 15 Central Park West
- Genre: Non-fiction
- Set in: New York City
- Publisher: Atria Books
- Publication date: March 11, 2014
- Publication place: United States
- Media type: Print, e-book
- Pages: 416
- ISBN: 978-1451666199 (hardcover edition)
- OCLC: 842316540
- Website: Official website

House of Outrageous Fortune: Fifteen Central Park West, the World's Most Powerful Address is a non-fiction book by American writer Michael Gross. The book was initially published on March 11, 2014 by Atria Books.

== Background ==
The book is dedicated to 15 Central Park West, a luxury condominium apartment building located at the corner of West 61st Street and Central Park West in New York City. Construction started in 2005 and was completed in 2008, costing a total of $950 million (equivalent to $1.42 billion in 2025). The two-tower building, known as "Limestone Jesus", was designed in a New Classical style by Robert A.M. Stern Architects and developed by Arthur and William Zeckendorfs. The boldface residents include Denzel Washington, Sting, Bob Costas, Norman Lear, Wall Street moguls, top executives, and Russian and Chinese oligarchs.

Gross offers a detailed research on the billion-dollar development and on the mindset and lifestyle of its residents, today's rich and famous. The book also explores the history of real estate development on Manhattan's Upper West Side and Columbus Circle area, and the Zeckendorf family. In an interview to The Real Deal, Gross stated that "15 CPW is very different than what Tom Wolfe called “the good buildings.” It redefines “good building.” It is a condo, not pre-war, on the West Side. And, of course, the other difference is how much [the units] sell for."

== Reception ==
Roberta Bernstein of USA TODAY stated "With a tsunami of colorful details, Gross traces the evolution of Manhattan's Upper West Side, the histories of the real estate families that saw (or gambled on) its development, the foreign shipping magnates whose heirs helped it to happen, and the circumstances and people who made über-luxury condos desirable." A reviewer of Publishers Weekly added "The book is at its best when describing how architect Robert Arthur Morton Stern exercised every creative instinct to maximize profit and stay within New York’s complex zoning requirements, but most of the text is a complex rundown of the buyers: who they are, where their money comes from, and why they bought." A reviewer of Kirkus Reviews commented "An incisive but somewhat tedious report of New York’s "new money."
