= Henry Raymond Selden =

Henry Raymond Selden (1821–1865) from Vermont, was an officer in the United States Army during the Mexican–American War, and in service on the frontiers and then in the Union Army during the American Civil War in New Mexico Territory.

== Early career ==
Henry Raymond Selden was born in Bennington, Vermont, on March 14, 1821. He was appointed Cadet from there to the United States Military Academy at West Point from July 1, 1839, to July 1, 1843, when he graduated 31st of 39 in his class. Promoted in the Army to Brevet Second Lieutenant, 1st Infantry Regiment serving at his first post at Fort Snelling, from 1843 to 1846. Promoted Second Lieutenant, 5th Infantry Regiment, March 25, 1846, he went to Mexico, where he was engaged in the Battle of Monterey, September 21‑23, 1846, — and Siege of Vera Cruz, March 9‑29, 1847, and was promoted First Lieutenant, 5th Infantry, September 8, 1847.

== Antebellum service on the frontiers ==
He was assigned to the garrison at East Pascagoula, Mississippi in 1848, then on frontier duty at Fort Washita, Indian Territory from 1848 to 1851. While there he served as Aide-de-camp to Brevet Brigadier General William G. Belknap from May 20 to October 10, 1851. He next served at Fort Belknap, Texas, 1851‑52, then was on recruitment duty from 1852 to 1854. Sometime during his time as Lieutenant he had married Mary Alice Selden who died at the age of 29, in January, 1854.

Selden returned to Texas frontier duty at Fort McIntosh, from 1854 to 1855 and Ringgold Barracks in 1855, serving as Adjutant, 5th Infantry, from May 1 to October 18, 1855. From that date promoted Captain, 5th Infantry, he returned to Ft. McIntosh from 1855 to 1856. From 1856 to 1857 he was in Florida involved with hostilities against the Seminole Indians in the area around Fort Myers. Then he served in garrison at Jefferson Barracks, before joining the Utah Expedition and being on frontier duty in Utah from 1857 to 1860. In the autumn of 1860, the 5th Regiment marched south into New Mexico Territory for operations against the Navajos. Selden served at Fort Defiance, and Fort Fauntleroy, in 1860, Fort Defiance, in 1860‑61, in Edward Canby's Navajo Expedition and again Fort Fauntleroy in 1861.

== American Civil War in New Mexico ==
With the secession crisis in New Mexico Territory, resulting in the formation of Confederate Arizona, Selden was sent to command and defend Fort Craig with five companies of the 5th Infantry Regiment from August 14, 1861, to January 31, 1862. Fort Craig blocked the approach to Union held New Mexico from Confederate Arizona up the Rio Grande or Jornada del Muerto. It was a base for the operations of detachments of Mounted Riflemen and New Mexico Volunteers. As Sibley's New Mexico Campaign began, Selden was made captain in command of regiment in operations in New Mexico, from January 31, 1862, to September 23, 1863. He led a battalion of four companies of the 5th Infantry Regiment garrison of Fort Craig in the Battle of Valverde. He was also in the Action of Pigeon's Ranch, March 28, 1862. Selden was involved in scouting the retreating Confederate Army, from March 31 to May, 1862 and was involved in the Action of Peralta, April 14, 1862, that forced the Confederate retreat down the relatively barren and waterless west bank of the Rio Grande.

Selden was back at Fort Craig, from May to August 14, 1862, then at Belen, New Mexico, from August 31 to September 29, 1862, and finally at Fort Marcy, from 1862 to September 23, 1863. While at Fort Marcy he was promoted major, of the U. S. Thirteenth Infantry Regiment on July 1, 1863, but remained in New Mexico Territory, appointed Superintendent of Recruiting Service and the Disbursing Officer for the Department of New Mexico, at Santa Fé, from September 1863 to April 25, 1864. On that later date Selden was promoted Colonel of 1st New Mexico Volunteer Infantry, Reorganized, in charge of Operations in New Mexico until February 2, 1865, the date of his death at Fort Union.

== Death and legacy ==
Selden died of an illness in at Fort Union, aged 44, on February 2, 1865. He was first buried at Fort Union, and when that post was closed his grave was moved to Santa Fe National Cemetery. Fort Selden was named for him soon after his death when that fort was established.

A cenotaph was also erected in Old Bennington Cemetery, Bennington, Bennington County, Vermont, memorializing Col Henry Raymond Selden and his wife when he was a Lieutenant, Mary Alice Selden who died on January 15, 1854, aged 29 years.
