= Jane Gross =

American sportswriter (1947–2022)

Jane Gross (September 10, 1947 – November 9, 2022) was an American sportswriter, journalist, and author. She was the first female sportswriter known to have entered a professional basketball locker room. In February 1975, as a reporter for Newsday she asked New York Knicks coach Red Holzman to enter the locker room at Madison Square Garden, to which he agreed.

Gross was born in 1947 in Manhattan, and graduated from Skidmore College in 1969 with a degree in literature. Her first journalism job was with Sports Illustrated, and she also worked for Newsday, The New York Times, and The Los Angeles Times. After spending her earliest years in journalism as a sportswriter, she expanded into general reporting and also wrote about the AIDS crisis, abortion, and the challenges faced by adults caring for their aging parents.

In 2011 Gross authored the book Bittersweet Season: Caring for Our Aging Parents – and Ourselves.

In 2018 she was given an award by the Association for Women in Sports Media.

She was the daughter of sportswriter Milton Gross of the New York Post.
