= Jean MacArthur =

Wife of Douglas MacArthur (1898–2000)

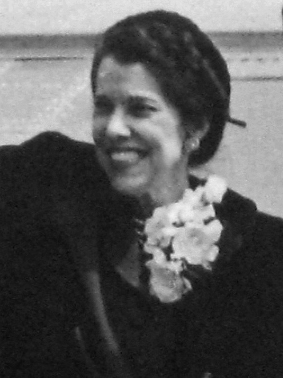
- MacArthur in 1950
- Born: Jean Marie Faircloth; December 28, 1898; Nashville, Tennessee, U.S.
- Died: January 22, 2000 (aged 101); New York, New York, U.S.
- Spouse: Douglas MacArthur (m. 1937; died 1964)
- Children: Arthur MacArthur IV
- Parents: Edward Cameron Faircloth Sr.; Sallie Dromgoole Beard Faircloth
- Awards: Philippine Legion of Honor; Presidential Medal of Freedom

Jean Marie MacArthur (née Faircloth; December 28, 1898 – January 22, 2000) was the second wife of U.S. Army General of the Army Douglas MacArthur.

== Early life and education ==
Born Jean Marie Faircloth in Nashville, Tennessee, she was the daughter of Edward C. Faircloth, a banker. After her parents divorced when she was eight, her mother took her to live with her grandparents in Murfreesboro. Her grandfather, a former captain in the Confederate Army, instilled in her a love of uniforms. She attended Ward-Belmont College in Nashville, but graduated from Soule College in Murfreesboro. Jean and her father can be found later listed on a passenger manifest of the SS Belgenland, which arrived in the Port of Los Angeles on December 29, 1927, from Balboa, Panama Canal Zone. When her father died, she inherited a large fortune and travelled extensively.

== Marriage ==
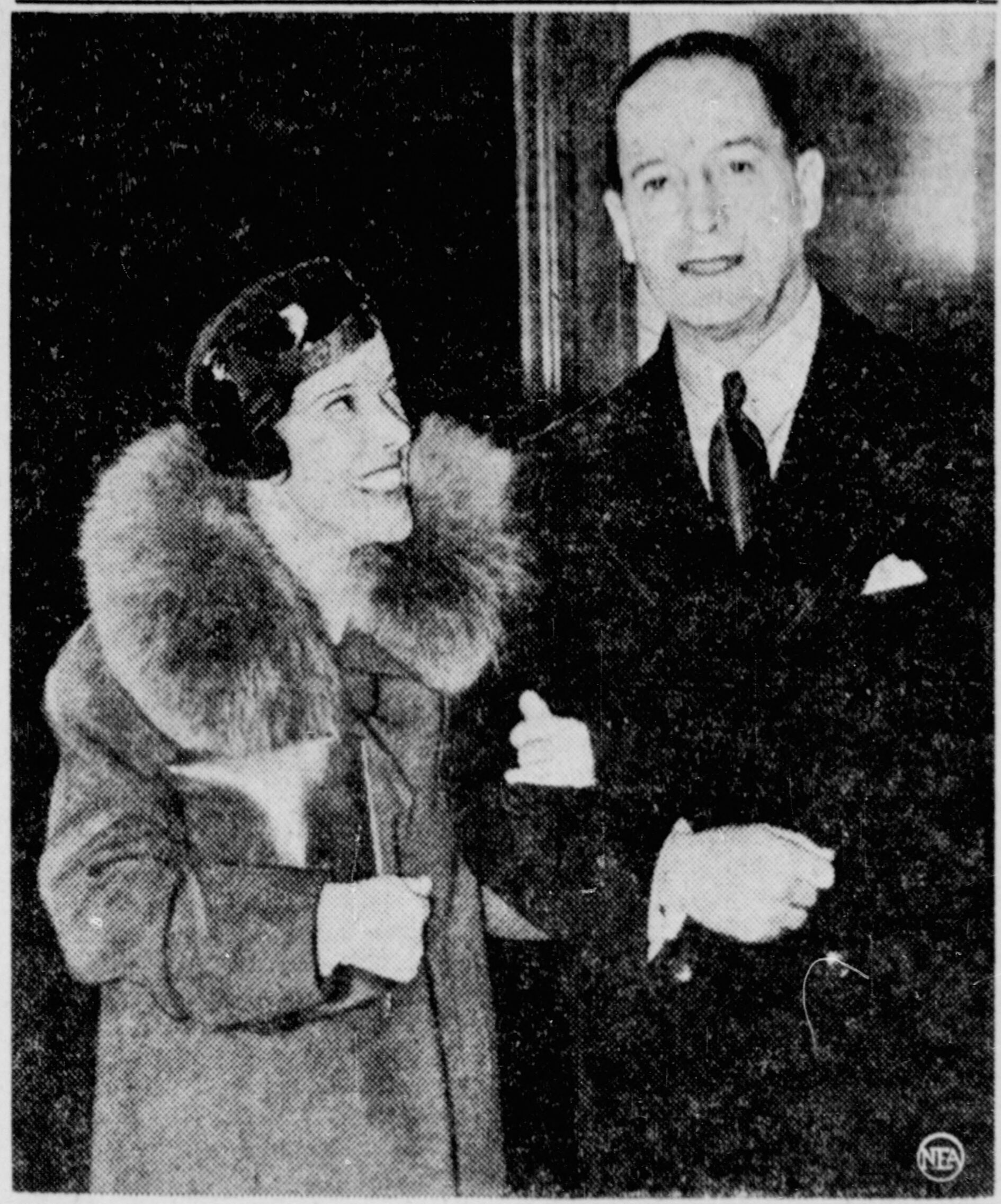
Douglas and Jean MacArthur on their wedding day after leaving the New York City courthouse.

On a trip she intended to be to Shanghai, in 1935, she met General MacArthur aboard the SS President Hoover, which was to stop first in Manila, where MacArthur would disembark. Despite the age difference — she was nearly nineteen years younger than he — they began a permanent relationship in Manila, and married in New York City on April 30, 1937, during Gen. MacArthur's trip home to build support for the defense of the Philippines. This was to be Gen. MacArthur's last trip to the mainland United States for the next 14 years, when he was relieved from duty by President Truman. His only other visits to U.S. soil between 1937 and 1951 were a 1944 strategy meeting in Honolulu, Hawaii with President Roosevelt and Admiral Nimitz and a 1950 meeting with President Truman on Wake Island.

Jean was MacArthur's second wife and he described her as his "constant friend, sweetheart, and devoted support." They had one son, Arthur MacArthur IV (1938–), and were married until Douglas' death in 1964.

== Wartime ==
Jean MacArthur was with her husband when the Japanese attacked the Philippines and went with him to the island of Corregidor in Manila's harbor. Even when the island was attacked, she refused to leave her husband. Only when President Roosevelt ordered the MacArthurs to leave they went to Australia.

== Charity work ==
After her husband's death she helped with the Metropolitan Opera and other charities. In her later years, she often gave speeches on her late husband's military career. In 1974, she was awarded honorary membership into the Southern Dames of America. President Ronald Reagan awarded her the Medal of Freedom in 1988 and the Philippine government gave her its Legion of Merit in 1993.

== Death ==
Mrs. MacArthur died of natural causes in Lenox Hill Hospital in Manhattan at age 101. She is entombed with her husband in the rotunda of the MacArthur Memorial in Norfolk, Virginia, the hometown of Gen. MacArthur's mother.
