= Arthur MacArthur Jr. =

American general (1845–1912)

- MacArthur in 1900

3rd Military Governor of the Philippines
- In office May 5, 1900 – July 4, 1901
- President: William McKinley
- Preceded by: Elwell Stephen Otis
- Succeeded by: William Howard Taft (as Governor-General of the Philippines)

Personal details
- Born: June 2, 1845 Chicopee Falls, Massachusetts, U.S.
- Died: September 5, 1912 (aged 67) Milwaukee, Wisconsin, U.S.
- Resting place: Arlington National Cemetery
- Spouse: Mary Pinkney Hardy (m. 1875)
- Children: Arthur III; Malcolm; Douglas
- Parents: Arthur MacArthur Sr. (father); Aurelia Belcher (mother)
- Relatives: Douglas MacArthur II (grandson); Arthur MacArthur IV (grandson)
- Nickname: The Boy Colonel

Military service
- Allegiance: United States
- Branch/service: United States Army; Union Army
- Years of service: 1861–1865; 1866–1909
- Rank: Lieutenant general
- Unit: 24th Wisconsin Volunteer Infantry Regiment; 13th Infantry Regiment; III Corps
- Commands: 1st Brigade, 2nd Division, Eighth Army Corps; 2nd Division, Eighth Corps; Eighth Corps; Department of Northern Luzon; Department of the Pacific; Military Governor of the Philippines
- Battles/wars: See list: American Civil War; Battle of Stones River; Battle of Chickamauga; Battle of Missionary Ridge; Atlanta campaign; Battle of Franklin (WIA); Indian Wars; Spanish–American War; Battle of Manila (1898); Philippine–American War; Battle of Manila (1899)
- Awards: Medal of Honor

Arthur MacArthur Jr. (June 2, 1845 – September 5, 1912) was a lieutenant general of the United States Army. He became the military Governor-General of the American-occupied Philippines in 1900; his term ended a year later due to clashes with the civilian governor, future-U.S. President William Howard Taft.

His son, Douglas MacArthur, was one of only five men promoted to the five-star rank of General of the Army during World War II. In addition to their both being promoted to the rank of general officer, Arthur MacArthur Jr. and Douglas MacArthur also share the distinction of having been the first father and son to each be awarded a Medal of Honor.

== Early life ==
MacArthur was born in Chicopee Falls, Massachusetts. His father was Arthur MacArthur Sr., a Scottish-born American lawyer, judge and politician who served as the fourth Governor of Wisconsin (albeit for only four days), a Wisconsin Circuit Court Judge in Milwaukee, and an Associate Justice on the Supreme Court of the District of Columbia.

His mother was Aurelia Belcher (1819–1864), the daughter of a wealthy industrialist, Benjamin B. Belcher. From his parents' marriage, he had one brother, Frank. After his mother's death in 1864, his father remarried to Mary E. Willcut.

== Military career ==
At the outbreak of the Civil War, MacArthur's father attempted to secure him an appointment to the United States Military Academy, even going so far as having a Wisconsin Senator take young MacArthur to appeal to President Abraham Lincoln at the White House, but they were unsuccessful as all the available slots were filled.

=== American Civil War ===
MacArthur during the Civil War

On August 4, 1862, his father secured a commission for the 17-year-old MacArthur as a first lieutenant, and he was appointed as adjutant of the 24th Wisconsin Volunteer Infantry Regiment, seeing action at Chickamauga, Stones River, Chattanooga, the Atlanta campaign and Franklin.

At the Battle of Missionary Ridge on November 25, 1863, during the Chattanooga campaign, the 18-year-old MacArthur inspired his regiment during a largely uncoordinated and spontaneous frontal assault of Union forces against entrenched Confederate forces on a hilltop. During the charge the regimental flags were carried in front, so that every flag-bearer was constantly a target, causing immense casualty among them. MacArthur seized the flag from a fallen comrade and planted the regimental flag on the crest of Missionary Ridge 35°1′7.15″N 85°15′51.02″W at a particularly critical moment, shouting "On, Wisconsin." For these actions, he was awarded the Medal of Honor. He was brevetted colonel in the Union Army the following year. Only 19 years old at the time, he became nationally recognized as "The Boy Colonel" (not to be confused with Henry K. Burgwyn, known as the "Boy Colonel of the Confederacy").

MacArthur was severely wounded in the Battle of Franklin, receiving bullet wounds to the chest and leg from a rebel officer's pistol, but would ultimately survive.

On January 25, 1864, he was promoted to major and about a year and a half later, on May 18, 1865, to lieutenant colonel – shortly before he was mustered out of service on June 10, 1865. In recognition of his gallantry in action he received brevets (honorary promotions) to lieutenant colonel and colonel dated March 15, 1865.

=== American Indian Wars ===
With the conclusion of the Civil War in June 1865, MacArthur resigned his commission and began the study of law. After just a few months, however, he decided this was not a good fit for him, so he resumed his career with the Army. He was recommissioned on February 23, 1866, as a second lieutenant in the Regular Army's 17th Infantry Regiment, with a promotion the following day to first lieutenant. Because of his outstanding record of performance during the Civil War, he was promoted in September of that year to captain. However, he would remain a captain for the following two decades, as promotion was slow in the small peacetime army.

Between 1866 and 1884, MacArthur completed assignments in Pennsylvania, New York, Utah Territory, Louisiana, and Arkansas.

In 1884, MacArthur became the post commander of Fort Selden, in New Mexico. The following year, he took part in the campaign against Geronimo. In 1889, he was promoted to Assistant Adjutant General of the Army with the rank of major, and was promoted to lieutenant colonel in 1897.

=== Oklahoma Land Rush of 1889 ===
Ahead of the Land Rush of 1889 (a land run in the Oklahoma Territory), the Army sent troops to maintain order in the absence of local governments. For this, MacArthur was made commanding officer of Camp Guthrie (in Guthrie, Oklahoma).

=== Spanish–American War (1898) ===
MacArthur (second from left) with his staff c. 1898

Following the outbreak of the Spanish–American War, MacArthur was serving as the adjutant general of the Third Army Corps in Georgia. In June 1898 he was brevetted to brigadier general in the volunteer army. He was appointed as commanding general of the 1st Brigade, 2nd Division, Eighth Army Corps and led it to victory at the Battle of Manila on August 12, 1898. He was promoted to major general on August 13, 1898.

=== Philippine–American War (1899–1902) ===
Major General MacArthur and his staff at the headquarters of the Second Division of the Eighth Army Corps in Bautista c. 1901

He led the 2nd Division of Eighth Corps during the Philippine–American War at the Battle of Manila (1899), the Malolos campaign and the Northern Offensive. When the American occupation of the Philippines turned from conventional battles to guerrilla warfare, MacArthur commanded the Department of Northern Luzon. In January 1900, he was appointed brigadier general in the Regular Army and was appointed military governor of the Philippines with command of Eighth Corps, replacing General Elwell S. Otis.

He authorized the expedition, under General Frederick Funston, that resulted in the capture of Emilio Aguinaldo. MacArthur persuaded the captured Aguinaldo to cease fighting and to swear allegiance to the United States. He was promoted to major general in the Regular Army on February 5, 1901.

During the war, President William McKinley relieved Major General Elwell S. Otis of command and replaced him with MacArthur giving him the title of Military Governor of the Philippines on May 6, 1900. However, William Howard Taft was appointed to head the Philippine Commission by McKinley and arrived to Manila in June 1900 to effect the transition from military to civil government. MacArthur firmly opposed the timing of direct involvement by the Philippine Commission as he did not believe the Philippines was ready for civil rule yet. Both Taft and MacArthur, in separate correspondences, informed Secretary of War, Elihu Root, of the contention between each other and their differing views on the future of the Philippines. On February 27, 1901, shortly after promoting MacArthur to the rank of major general, Secretary Root informed Major General Adna R. Chaffee that he would succeed MacArthur as military governor in the Philippines. However, Chaffee would be subordinate to William Howard Taft, who would be appointed as Civilian Governor.

On June 21, 1901, Root's War Department informed MacArthur that Chaffee was to replace him as military head in the Philippines with the change to take place on July 4, 1901. Taft decided, "four, possibly five and two small parts of others", of the 27 organized provinces across the Philippines (16 additional provinces remained unorganized at the end of 1900), "in which armed insurrection continues, will remain under the executive jurisdiction of the military governor and commanding general". The contentiousness between Taft and MacArthur seemed all too apparent as Taft stated publicly that neither his approach of municipal code nor the provincial government act under both Otis and MacArthur would form a perfect government, "though it was possible to make the former much more complete than the latter". Taft further distanced himself and work by characterizing prior military efforts as "two experiments in municipal government under the administrations of General Otis and General MacArthur before the [Philippine] Commission began its legislative work".

After the combined ceremony installing Taft and change of command from MacArthur to Chaffee on July 4, 1901, MacArthur packed his bags that same day and boarded a ship for the United States.

=== Return to the United States ===
MacArthur c. 1904

In the several years that followed, he was assigned to serve at various times as commander of the Department of the Colorado, the Lakes, the East, and eventually the Pacific Division. When the Russo-Japanese War exploded in early 1904, eight American officers were promptly sent to the Manchurian front as observers. Chafing at the bit at his headquarters in Fort Mason, San Francisco, MacArthur requested that he also be assigned as a military observer upon hearing of the outbreak of war between Russia and Japan in 1904. He finally secured the appointment, but arrived in Manchuria in mid-March, 1905, just after the major fighting had ended with the Japanese triumph at the Battle of Mukden. When the Portsmouth Peace Conference was convened in August, MacArthur was sent to Tokyo as military attaché to the American legation.

MacArthur (right) and governor George Pardee during joint maneuvers between the U.S. Army and the California National Guard in San Luis Obispo County, August 1904

During Secretary of War William Howard Taft's 1905 trip to Japan, Taft also met with MacArthur, as he was now the United States military attaché to Japan, in Yokohama (likely at the Oriental Palace Hotel where MacArthur and his wife, Mrs. "Pinky" MacArthur, were staying). In the course of this meeting, it was decided 1st Lieutenant Douglas MacArthur would replace Captain Paul W. West as Maj. Gen. MacArthur's aide-de-camp and accompany him on a 'reconnaissance mission' to various Asian countries from November 1, 1905, through late June 1906 traveling over 20,000 miles (32,000 km), per Douglas MacArthur vouchers.

On July 17, 1906, MacArthur, Mrs. MacArthur, and Douglas MacArthur sailed from Yokohama and arrived at San Francisco to resume his post at Fort Mason as Commander of the Pacific Division. In this capacity he was promoted to lieutenant general in September 1906, but though now the highest-ranking officer in the Army, was not elevated to chief of staff then or later. Brigadier General J. Franklin Bell had been made the chief of staff while MacArthur was in Asia on April 14, 1906, and subsequently promoted to major general on 3 January 1907.

"Loading the first '07 Pope-Toledo shipped by express to the Coast, at Toledo, Ohio. This car has just arrived and was delivered to General Arthur MacArthur of the United States Army." Town Talk, February 2, 1907

In early 1907, MacArthur, after 47 years of devoted and distinguished service, was told by Taft's War Department that he had been passed over for chief of staff of the Army. Instead of chief of staff, he was offered command of the Eastern department. MacArthur refused Taft's offer of commanding the Eastern department, stating that it would mean a humiliating reduction in authority for him. MacArthur proposed that the War Department either accept his retirement or assign him to some "special duty" which would not be an affront to his honor. Shortly thereafter, MacArthur received orders to 'proceed to Milwaukee, there to perform such duties as may hereafter be assigned', but no further duties were given to him. Taft was inaugurated as President of the United States in March 1909, and MacArthur retired quietly from the Army on June 2, 1909.

MacArthur never did realize his dream of commanding the entire Army. He was one of the last officers on active duty in the Army who had served in the Civil War.

MacArthur was elected a member of the Military Order of the Loyal Legion of the United States (MOLLUS) in 1868 and was assigned insignia number 648. On May 6, 1908, he was elected commander of the Wisconsin Commandery of MOLLUS. He was elected as the Order's senior vice commander in chief on October 18, 1911, and became the Order's commander in chief upon the death of Rear Admiral George W. Melville on March 17, 1912. He held the office until his own death six months later.

== Personal life ==
On May 19, 1875, MacArthur married Mary Pinkney "Pinky" Hardy (1852–1935), daughter of Thomas A. Hardy of Norfolk, Virginia. Together, they had three children:

- Arthur MacArthur III (1876–1923), a captain in the United States Navy who was awarded the Navy Cross in World War I.
- Malcolm MacArthur (1878–1883), who died young of measles.
- Douglas MacArthur (1880–1964), who was born at the Arsenal Barracks in Little Rock, Arkansas

On September 5, 1912, while addressing a reunion of the 24th Wisconsin veterans in Milwaukee, MacArthur was suddenly and fatally stricken by an apoplectic attack (now known as a stroke). As MacArthur recounted "one of the most remarkable scouting expeditions of the war", he told his men, "Your indomitable courage...", then halted his speech with the words, "Comrades, I am too weak to go on". He sat back down and collapsed, dying moments later. A young medical intern, serving as a waiter at the banquet, pronounced him dead on the platform. Dr. William J. Cronyn, the Surgeon-General of the Grand Army of the Republic for the State of New York, and a veteran of the Civil War in the 30th Michigan, was also present and called Mrs. MacArthur but was unable to tell her of the General's death over the phone.

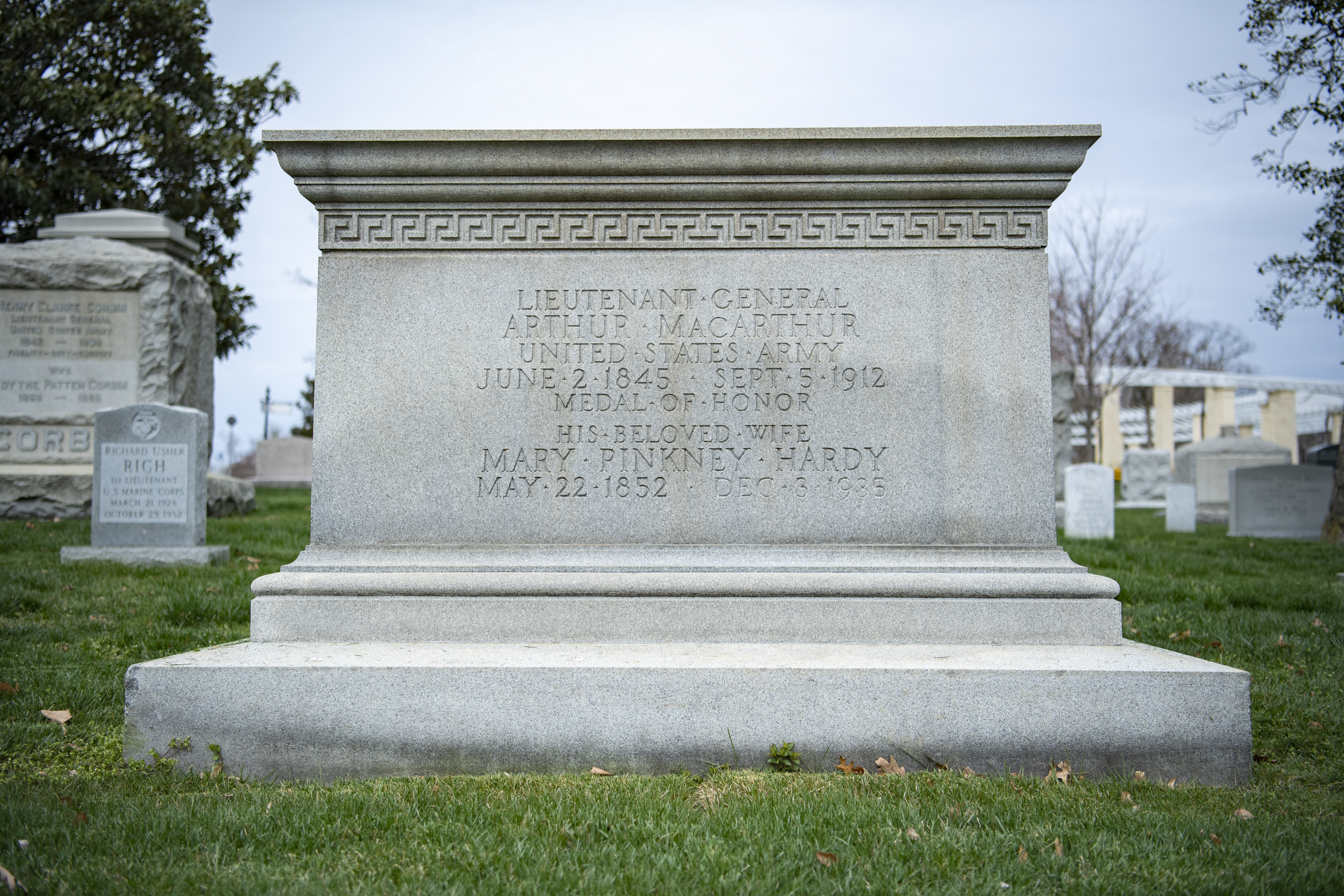
Gravestone in Arlington National Cemetery, Arlington, Virginia

Both Mrs. MacArthur and Major General Charles King, a retired officer and close friend of MacArthur, carried out MacArthur's final wishes to not be dressed [buried] in his uniform and for the funeral service to be 'utterly devoid' of military display. Except for MacArthur's two sons, the only active military officer present at the funeral was a solitary colonel from a nearby fort. Finally, per MacArthur's final wishes, he was interred in a cemetery in Milwaukee rather than in Arlington National Cemetery. He was originally buried in Milwaukee on Monday, September 7, 1912, but was moved to Section 2 Gravesite 856-A of Arlington National Cemetery in 1926. He is buried among other members of the family there, while his son Douglas chose to be buried in Norfolk, Virginia, the hometown of his mother, Mary Pinkney Hardy, and the site of the Hardy family home Riveredge.

The Military Order of the Loyal Legion of the United States prepared and printed a eulogy praising MacArthur's military record and extolling "his fervent patriotism, his unshaken loyalty, his silent and soldierly acceptance of conditions little looked for in view of his great services and exalted rank".

For some reason, Mrs. MacArthur was granted a pension of only $1,200.00/year, less than half of the $2,500.00/year for widows of all other lieutenant generals. Attorney and family friend James Flanders led a long but successful fight to get Mrs. MacArthur the same pension as the others.

== Awards and honors ==
=== Military awards ===
- Medal of Honor
- Civil War Campaign Medal
- Indian Campaign Medal
- Spanish Campaign Medal
- Philippine Campaign Medal

=== Medal of Honor citation ===

Rank and Organization:

First Lieutenant, and Adjutant, 24th Wisconsin Infantry. Place and date: At Missionary Ridge, Tenn., November 25, 1863. Entered service at: Milwaukee, Wis. Birth: Springfield, Mass. Date of issue: June 30, 1890.

Citation:

Seized the colors of his regiment at a critical moment and planted them on the captured works on the crest of Missionary Ridge.

Just over eight decades later (1864–1945), his son, Douglas MacArthur, would also gain fame for leading U.S. forces to victory in the Philippines. Arthur MacArthur Jr. and Douglas MacArthur were the first father and son ever to each be awarded a Medal of Honor. To date, the only other father and son to be given this honor are former president Theodore Roosevelt and his son, Theodore Roosevelt Jr.

=== Legacy ===
Fort MacArthur, which protected the San Pedro, California, harbor from 1914 until 1974, was named after General Arthur MacArthur. Camp MacArthur, a World War I training camp in Waco, Texas, was also named for the General.

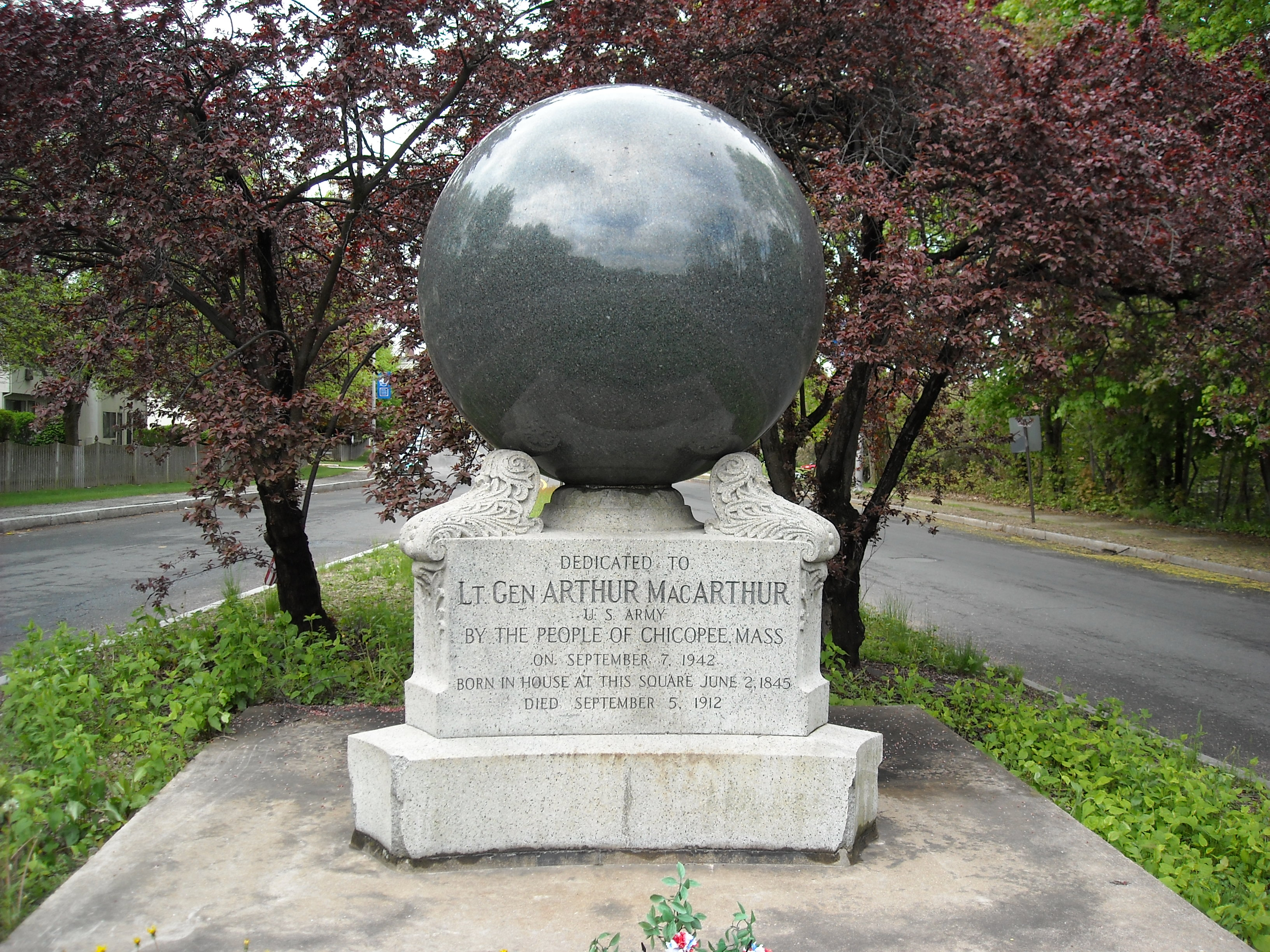
MacArthur's Ball located in Chicopee, MA

MacArthur Square in Chicopee was named for the General. MacArthur Square was originally located at the intersection of Broadway, East and Belcher streets. Within the square was MacArthur's Ball, a 22-ton monument, which was dedicated to the General on September 7, 1942. During Chicopee's 1975 urban renewal project, MacArthur Square was removed and the monument was moved to its present location on Church St.

One of MacArthur's fellow officers in the 24th Wisconsin was future United States Senator John L. Mitchell, the father of controversial Army aviator Major General Billy Mitchell. MacArthur's son, General Douglas MacArthur, was a member of the younger Mitchell's court martial in 1925.

The actor Tom Palmer (1912–1997) played Arthur MacArthur Jr. in the 1959 episode, "The Little Trooper", of the syndicated television anthology series, Death Valley Days, hosted by Stanley Andrews. Child actor Bryan Russell (1952–2016) played Arthur's four-year-old son, Douglas, the subject of the title of the episode, set at Fort Selden in the New Mexico Territory. Leonard Bremen (1915–1986) was cast as played Trooper Norkul, who takes a protective interest in young Douglas.

== Dates of rank ==
Insignia	Rank	Component	Date
	First lieutenant	24th Wisconsin	August 24, 1862
	Major	24th Wisconsin	January 25, 1864
	Brevet colonel	Volunteers	March 13, 1865
	Lieutenant colonel	24th Wisconsin	May 18, 1865
	Second lieutenant	Regular Army	February 23, 1866
	First lieutenant	Regular Army	February 24, 1866
	Captain	Regular Army	July 28, 1866
	Major	Regular Army	July 21, 1889
	Lieutenant colonel	Regular Army	May 26, 1896
	Brigadier general	Volunteers	May 27, 1898
	Major general	Volunteers	August 28, 1898
	Brigadier general	Regular Army	January 2, 1900
	Major general	Regular Army	February 5, 1901
	Lieutenant general	Regular Army	September 15, 1906

Union Army

- First Lieutenant, 24th Wisconsin Volunteer Infantry Regiment, Union Army – August 4, 1862
- Major, 24th Wisconsin Volunteer Infantry Regiment, Union Army – January 25, 1864
- Brevet Lieutenant Colonel and Brevet Colonel – March 13, 1865
- Lieutenant Colonel, 24th Wisconsin Volunteer Infantry Regiment, Union Army – May 18, 1865
- Mustered out of Volunteer service – June 10, 1865
- Colonel, 24th Wisconsin Volunteer Infantry Regiment, Union Army – June 13, 1865 (Commissioned but not mustered)

United States Army

- Second Lieutenant – February 23, 1866
- First Lieutenant – February 24, 1866
- Captain – July 28, 1866
- Major – July 1, 1889
- Lieutenant Colonel – May 26, 1896
- Brigadier General of Volunteers – May 27, 1898
- Major General of Volunteers – August 13, 1898
- Brigadier General (Regular Army) – January 2, 1900
- Major General – February 5, 1901
- Lieutenant General – September 15, 1906

== In popular culture ==
- MacArthur was a character in the alternate history novel 1901 by Robert Conroy (1995).
- MacArthur was portrayed by James Paolleli in the Filipino film, El Presidente (2012).
- MacArthur was portrayed by Miguel Faustmann in the Filipino film, Heneral Luna (2015), and its sequel, Goyo: Ang Batang Heneral (2018).

== See also ==
- List of Medal of Honor recipients
- List of American Civil War Medal of Honor recipients: M–P

== Bibliography ==
- James, D. Clayton (1970). The Years of MacArthur. Vol. 1. Boston: Houghton Mifflin. ISBN 0-395-10948-5. OCLC 60070186.
- MacArthur, Douglas (1964). Reminiscences of General of the Army Douglas MacArthur. Annapolis: Bluejacket Books. ISBN 1-55750-483-0. OCLC 220661276.
- Young, Kenneth Ray (1994). The General's General: The Life and Times of Arthur MacArthur. Boulder, Colorado: Westview Press. ISBN 0-8133-2195-6.

Government offices
Preceded by Elwell Stephen Otis	Military Governor of the Philippines; May 5, 1900 – July 4, 1901	Succeeded by William Howard Taft as civilian Governor-General
