= Arthur MacArthur III =

United States Navy officer (1876–1923)

- Born: June 1, 1876
- Died: December 2, 1923 (aged 47); Washington, D.C., US
- Burial place: Arlington National Cemetery
- Spouse: Mary Hendry McCalla (m. 1902)
- Children: 5, including Douglas MacArthur, II
- Relatives: Arthur MacArthur, Jr. (father); Douglas MacArthur, I (brother); See MacArthur family
- Military career
- Allegiance: United States
- Branch: United States Navy
- Service years: 1896–1923
- Rank: Captain
- Commands: USS Winslow (TB-5); USS Holland (SS-1); USS McCall (DD-28); USS San Francisco (CM-2); USS South Dakota (ACR-9); USS Chattanooga (CL-18)
- Conflicts: Spanish–American War; Battle of Santiago; Philippine–American War; Boxer Rebellion; World War I; U-boat Campaign
- Awards: Navy Cross; Navy Distinguished Service Medal

Arthur MacArthur III (June 1, 1876 – December 2, 1923) was a United States Navy officer, whose active-duty career extended from the Spanish–American War through World War I. He was the oldest brother of General Douglas H. MacArthur (1880–1964).

== Early life ==
A son of United States Army General Arthur MacArthur Jr. (1845–1912), he chose a career in the Navy instead of following his father, graduating from the United States Naval Academy in 1896.

== Naval career ==
During the Spanish–American War, Ensign MacArthur served aboard the steam yacht USS Vixen (PY-4) in the Battle of Santiago. He later participated in naval operations during the Philippine–American War and the Boxer Rebellion.

On August 21, 1902, in Newport, Rhode Island, he married Mary Hendry McCalla (1877–1959), the daughter of Rear Admiral Bowman H. McCalla. His brother Douglas, a cadet at the United States Military Academy at the time, was his best man. Arthur and Mary MacArthur had five children, Arthur (1904–1912), Bowman McCalla, Douglas (named in honor of his brother), Mary Elizabeth, and Malcolm (who died while attending the Naval Academy in 1933).

From 1901 to 1903, MacArthur commanded the torpedo boat Winslow. While in this capacity, he was involved in early submarine boat testing. While also commanding the USS Holland, he participated in Electric Boat's testing using their prototype Fulton, as a testbed for the Plunger-class submarines.

In November 1901, MacArthur was aboard the Fulton when it set an underwater endurance record of 15 hours on the bottom of Peconic Bay, New York.

Later, MacArthur was injured when, on a run from New Suffolk, New York, to Washington, D.C., to exhibit the submarine to naval committees of the House and Senate, the Fulton experienced a battery explosion off the Delaware Breakwater. By June 1903, he was at Mare Island Naval Shipyard in command of the submarine flotilla consisting of the Pike and Grampus.

MacArthur was transferred to the battleship Ohio prior to her commissioning in October 1904, making him a plank owner, and served aboard her until September 1906, when he was transferred to the United States Naval Academy. At the Naval Academy, he served initially as aide to the superintendent, Admiral James H. Sands and subsequently on the staff for the commandant of midshipmen. His other commands included destroyer USS McCall (DD-28), minelayer USS San Francisco (CM-2), armored cruiser USS South Dakota (ACR-9) and light cruiser USS Chattanooga (CL-18).

For distinguished service in protecting convoys from U-boats engaged in the Atlantic U-boat Campaign during 1918, MacArthur was awarded the Navy Cross and the Distinguished Service Medal. He was promoted to captain on January 1, 1921. MacArthur was a hereditary member of the Military Order of the Loyal Legion of the United States by right of his father's having served as a Union officer in the Civil War. Captain MacArthur died in Washington, D.C., of appendicitis in 1923, and was buried in Arlington National Cemetery near his parents.

== Awards ==
- Navy Cross
- Navy Distinguished Service Medal
- Sampson Medal
- Spanish Campaign Medal
- China Campaign Medal
- Philippine Campaign Medal
- World War I Victory Medal

=== Navy Cross Citation ===
"For distinguished service in the line of his profession as commanding officer of the U.S.S. Chattanooga engaged in the important, exacting and hazardous duty of transporting and escorting troops and supplies to European ports through waters infested with enemy submarines and mines."

== Dates of rank ==
- Midshipman, United States Naval Academy – 6 September 1892
- Ensign – 6 May 1898
- Lieutenant (junior grade) – 6 May 1901
- Lieutenant – 3 March 1903
- Lieutenant Commander – 25 February 1909
- Commander – 17 August 1915
- Captain – 1 January 1921
