= Pre-war architecture =

American architectural time period

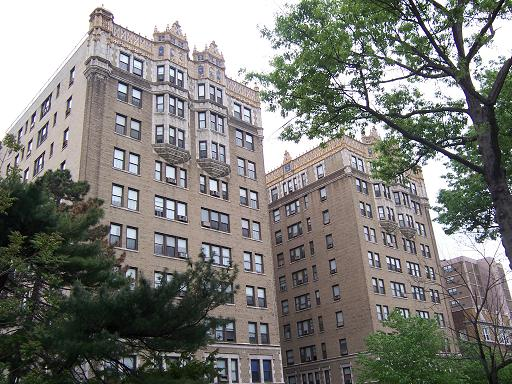
A "pre-war" apartment building in East Orange, New Jersey

Pre-war architecture refers to buildings built in the period between the turn of the 20th century until the Second World War, particularly in and around New York City. Many mid- and high-rise apartment buildings which were built between 1900 and 1939 in New York and surrounding areas are considered "pre-war" and known for their spaciousness, hardwood flooring, detailing, and, in some cases, fireplaces. Quite often they are luxury rentals or co-op apartments.

== Examples ==
- 620 Park Avenue
- 655 Park Avenue
- 740 Park Avenue
- 834 Fifth Avenue
- The Beresford
- 444 East 58th Street

== See also ==
- Antebellum architecture
