= 444 East 58th Street =

Apartment building in Manhattan, New York

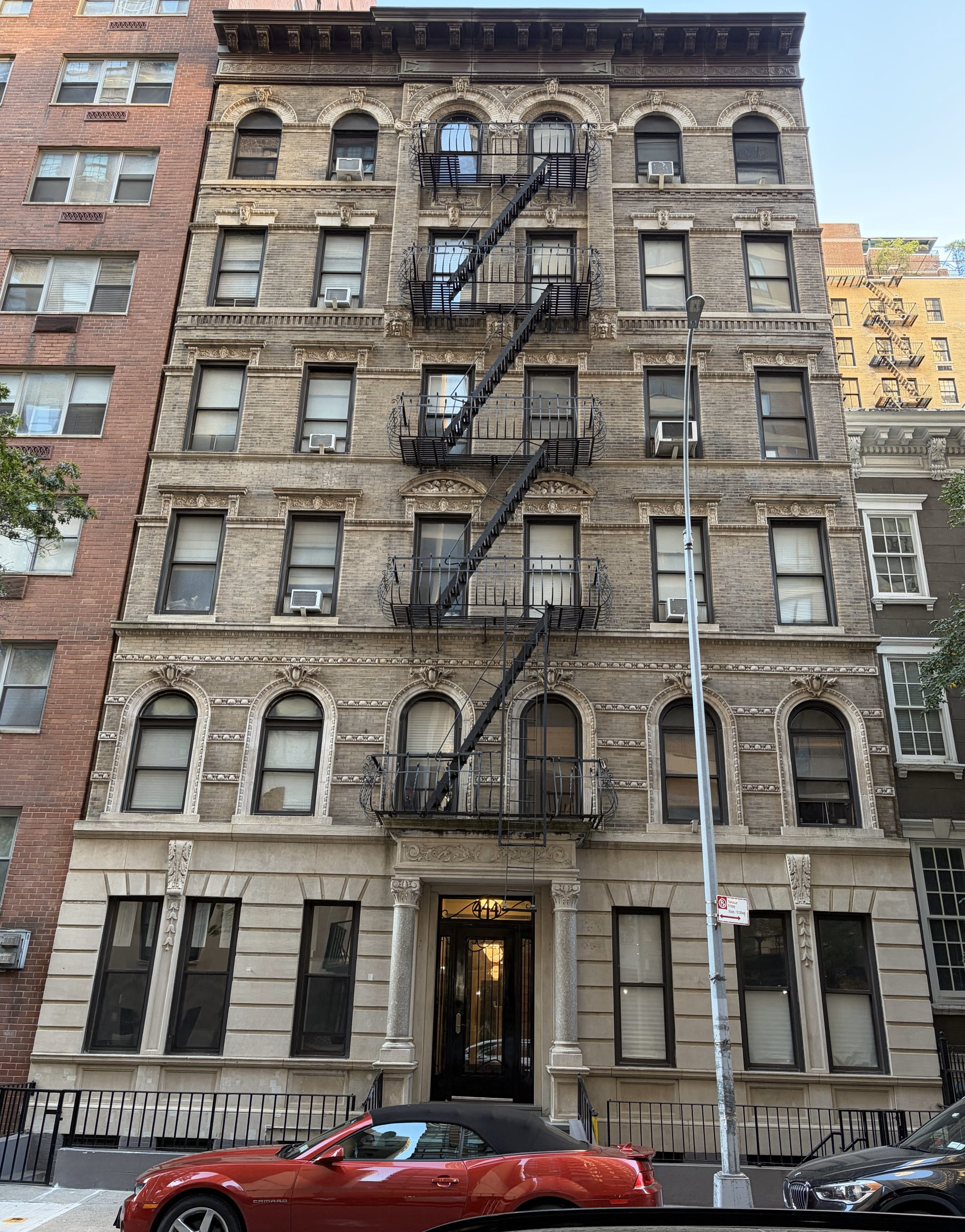
- 444 East 58th Street in September 2025

General information
- Type: Housing cooperative
- Architectural style: Beaux-Arts
- Location: 444 East 58th Street, New York, NY, U.S.
- Coordinates: 40.758077°N 73.960789°W
- Elevation: 157.5ft
- Completed: 1901
- Inaugurated: 1901
- Cost: $55,000
- Owner: 444-446 East 58th Owners Corp
- Operator: New Bedford Management Corp

Height
- Top floor: 6

Technical details
- Floor count: 6
- Lifts/elevators: 1

Design and construction
- Architect: George F. Pelham

Other information
- Number of units: 26

444 East 58th Street is a six-story residential building located on 58th Street in the Sutton Place neighborhood of Manhattan in New York City, United States. Designed in the Beaux-Arts style by architect George F. Pelham, the structure was completed in 1901. Originally constructed as a middle-class walk-up rental for developers Abraham Levy and Isaac Haft, the building was retrofitted with an elevator in 1956 and converted into a cooperative in 1984. The area used to be farmland.

Throughout the early 20th century, the property changed hands several times and remained a rental property, housing diverse commercial tenants—such as the River Book House and the Institute of Physical Medicine and Rehabilitation directed by Howard A. Rusk—alongside residents. In 2015, the cooperative sold its air rights to the developers of the adjacent Sutton 58 tower.

The building's demographics shifted toward the arts and professions as Sutton Place evolved. Notable residents have included Crockett Johnson, who wrote Harold and the Purple Crayon, and Drue Heinz, publisher of The Paris Review.

== Location and history ==
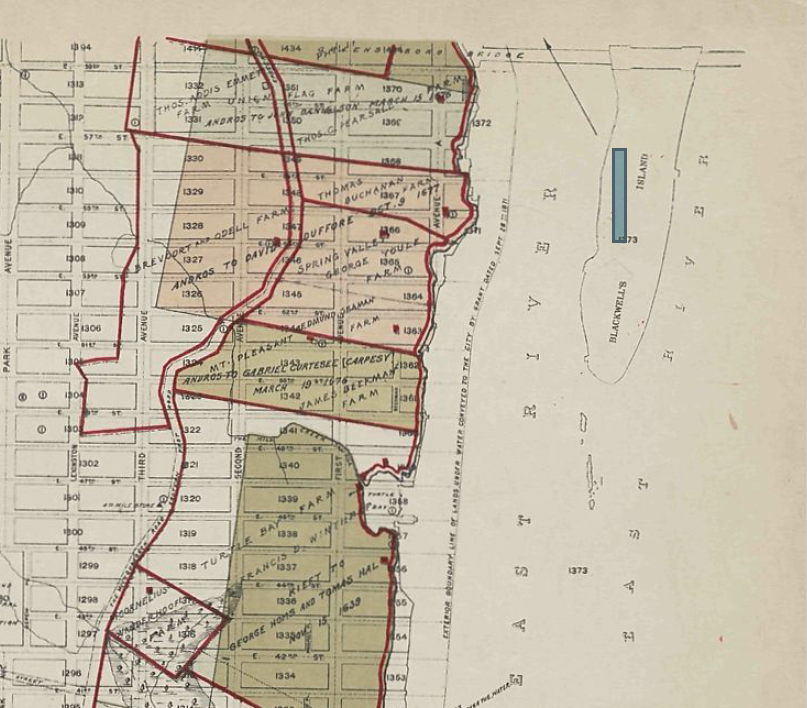
444 East 58th Street stands on what was part of the Thomas C. Pearsall Farm in 1815

444 East 58th Street is located in the Sutton Place neighborhood of Manhattan in New York City. The area was farmland until 1815. According to The Iconography of Manhattan Island, Block 1369, which is where 444 East 58th Street lies, was at the Thomas C. Pearsall Farm. Lower class brownstones were built in the 1870s by Effingham B. Sutton.

By 1879, the street grid had been implemented and two townhouses had been built: one on 444 East 58th Street and another on 446 East 58th Street. In 1893, 444 East 58th Street was sold twice: the first time for $9,525 on February 27, and the second time for $10,250 on June 15. Elenor Koffman sold 444 East 58th Street to John C. Mayforth on May 12, 1899.

=== Development and initial sellings ===
444 East 58th Street was built in 1901 for $55,000, originally as a middle-class walk-up rental building, as reported in Engineering News. (Note: The official completion date of 1901 is supported by property management records and archival data. Some modern commercial real estate databases cite a later date, such as 1920 or 1921. Property records and the 1906 birth of cartoonist Crockett Johnson in the building indicate a 1901 completion date, contradicting these later estimates.)

From 1901 to 1928, 444 East 58th Street was bought and sold by numerous people and companies. On March 8, 1901, the apartment was sold by John C. Mayforth to Isaac Haft and Abraham Levy for $4,500 plus mortgages owed, per the $4.50 revenue stamp paid, Haft and his wife sold their part of the building to Abraham Levy for $46,500 on January 15, 1903. On March 2, 1904, Abraham Levy and the World Realty Company sold 444 East 58th Street to Hyman Sclessinger and his brother, who kept the building from March 5, 1904, until they sold it to Gustav Lewkowitz and Herman Fuld on May 15, 1906. Lewkowitz, Fuld, and their wives purchased 444 East 58th Street on May 16, 1906, and owned it for 22 years until September 1928, when the property was sold to Lawrence T. Berliner. Berliner purchased the property for investment in September 1928, expecting to build a more modern building in its place; instead, he sold it to Nicholas Zurla three months later.

=== 1930s to 1980s ===
After Zurla purchased the building, the River Book House opened at 444 East 58th Street on May 7, 1932, by E. R. Armstrong and J. M. Wolcott. Announced in The Publishers Weekly as a new neighborhood bookshop, it was styled to serve the growing Sutton Place community and took its name from the nearby East River.

In the mid‑1940s, 444 East 58th Street housed the Institute of Physical Medicine and Rehabilitation, directed by Howard A. Rusk, a pioneer of modern rehabilitation medicine. The Institute, which later became affiliated with New York University and evolved into the Rusk Institute of Rehabilitation Medicine, was among the first comprehensive rehabilitation centers in the United States. Initially designed as a walkup, in 1956, the building was upgraded with an elevator. On March 4, 1982, Barry Levites and Howard Parnes purchased the building.

=== Rental prices (1929 to 1972) ===
Monthly rental prices of 444 East 58th Street, with relevant details
Date	Price	Further details	Refs.
November 4, 1929	$65-$70	2-bedroom/1-bath apartment	
February 7, 1930	$65-$75	—N/a	
January 20, 1943	$55-$65	—N/a	
December 4, 1955	$165-$175	Prices varied before and after elevator installation, respectively.	
May 15, 1966	$242	Listed for $242 as rent controlled, Eat-in Kitchen, French windows, Air Conditioner, sublet 1.5 years.	
December 20, 1970	$305	2-bedroom apartment with an elevator	
December 3, 1972	$350	Apartment was listed as newly decorated with a modern kitchen and air conditioning.	

=== 1984 to present ===
On September 7, 1984, 444 East 58th Street became a cooperative, known as 444-446 E 58TH OWNERS CP. As of the 2010s and 2020s, real-estate listings describe the co-op as having a video intercom, and a common laundry room. On July 30, 2015, Sutton 58 purchased the air rights of 444 East 58th Street for $16,912,626.

== Notable residents ==
Due to its location in Sutton Place, as well as its modest scale, 444 East 58th Street has been accessible to individuals working in the arts and public affairs, several of whom achieved recognition in their respective fields, as seen below.

- Albert Jaegers, American sculptor, in 1905.
- Crockett Johnson, between his birth in 1906 and his sister's birth in 1910. He was an American cartoonist, children's book illustrator, and writer.
- Joy Montgomery Higgins, in 1934. She was an American suffragist, social worker, writer, and cultural advocate who championed women's rights, community welfare, and the arts.
- Isaac Don Levine, in 1936. He was a 20th-century Russian-born American journalist and anticommunist writer, who is known as a specialist on the Soviet Union.
- Cornelius P. Rhoads, in 1948. He was an American pathologist and oncologist.
- Peter Turgeon, from 1949 to c. 1964. He was an American stage, film, and television actor, as well as a stage manager.
- Detlev F. Vagts, in 1958. He was a scholar of international law, known for his long career at Harvard Law School and his contributions to the study of international economic and business law.
- Nicolai Abracheff, in 1978. He was an abstract painter and director of the Abracheff School of Art.
- Drue Heinz, actress, philanthropist, arts patron, and socialite, owned apartment GE, which was sold by her Estate in 2020.

== Gallery ==
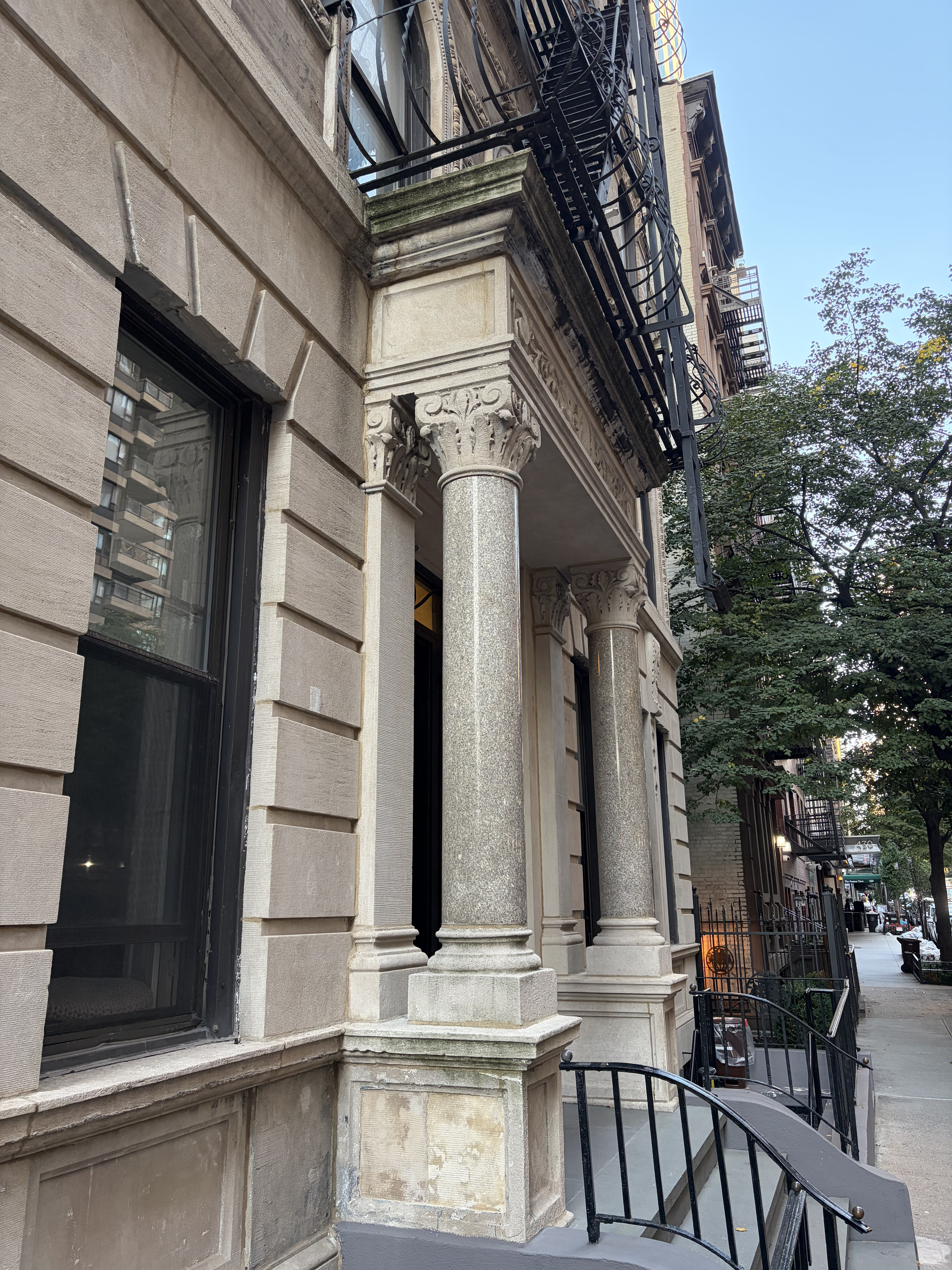
Corinthian columns

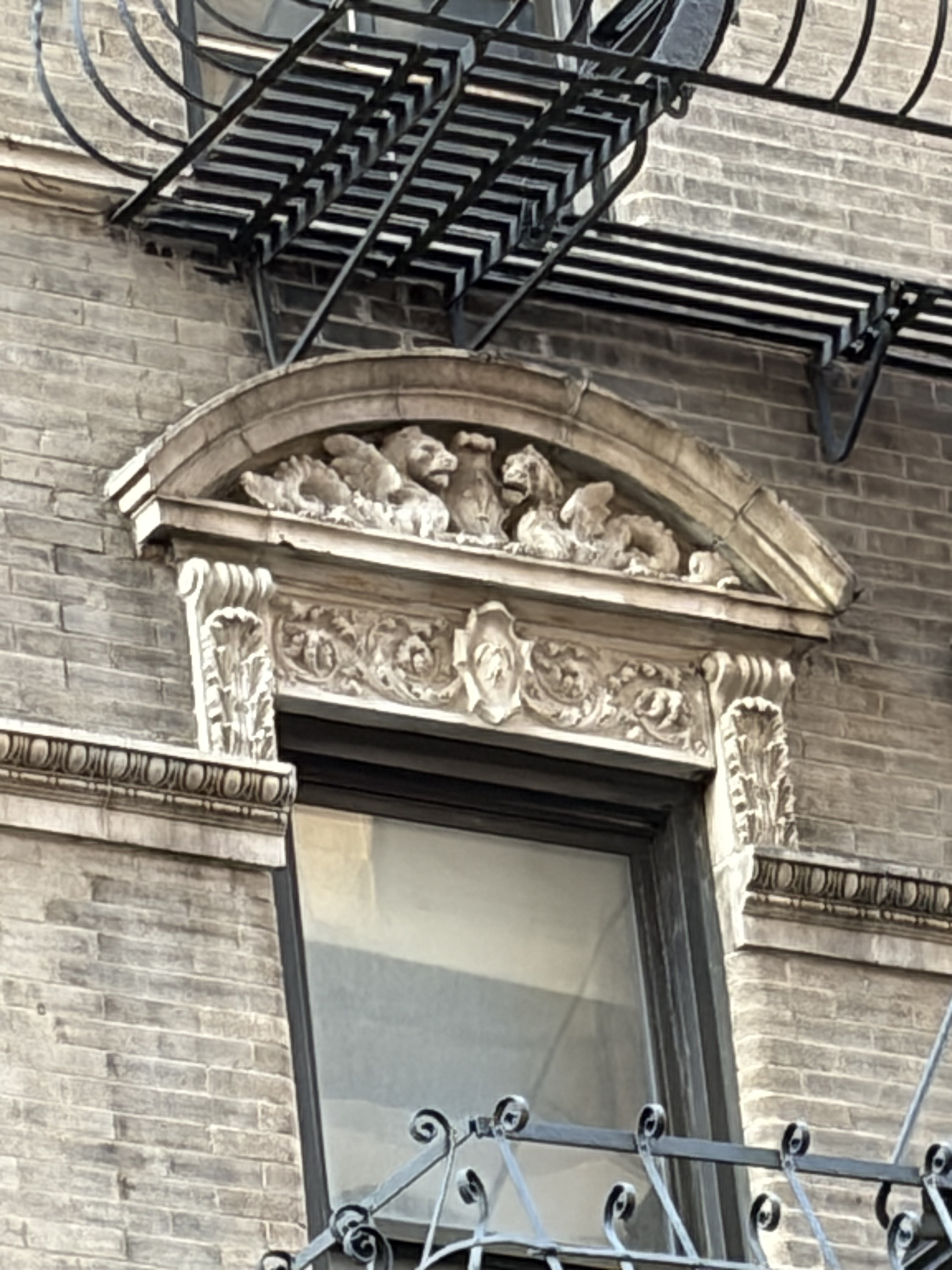
Lunette with dragons on top of a cartouche, and two modillions

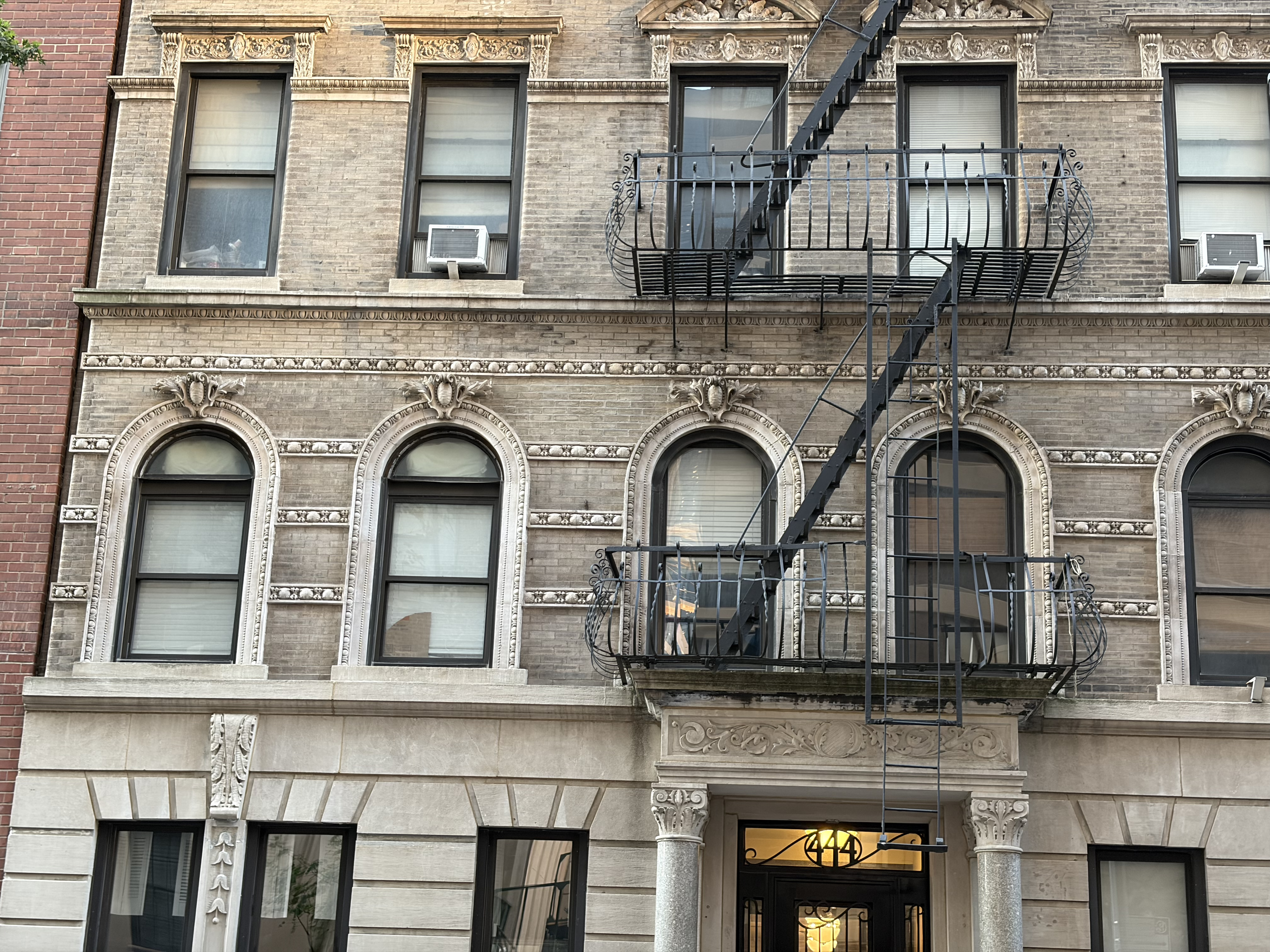
Part of the façade

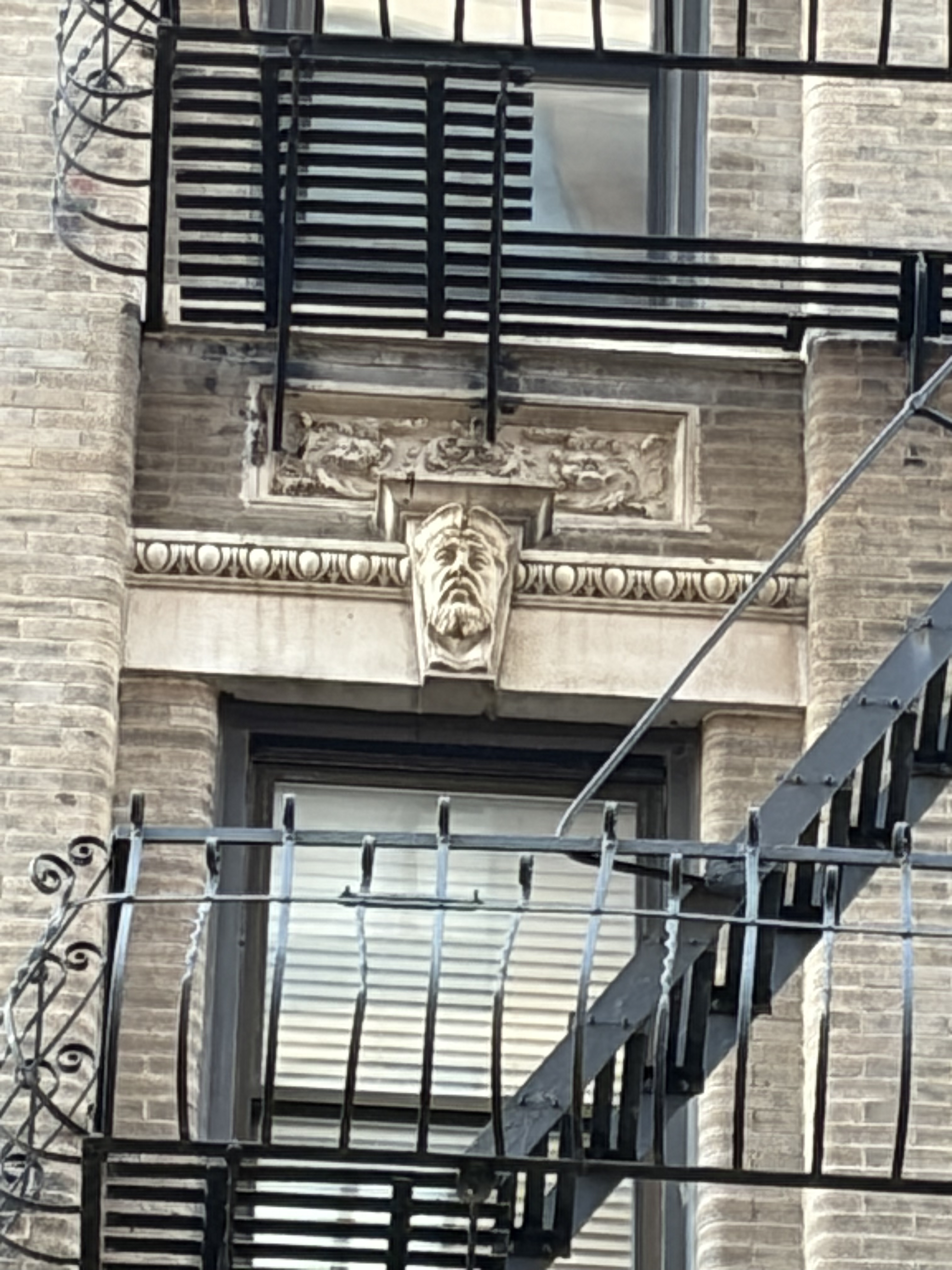
Mascaron depicting a king motif

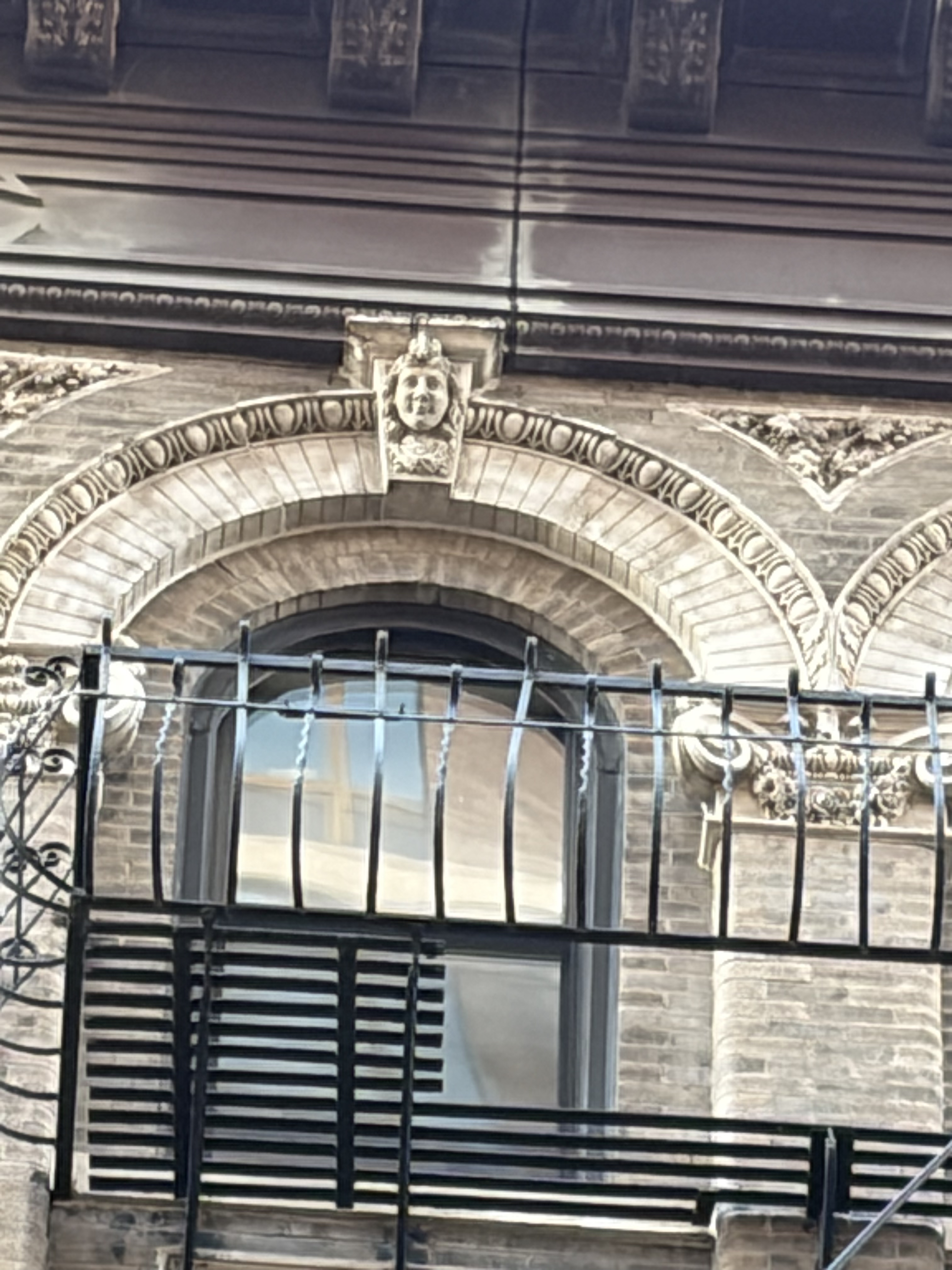
Mascaron depicting a lady

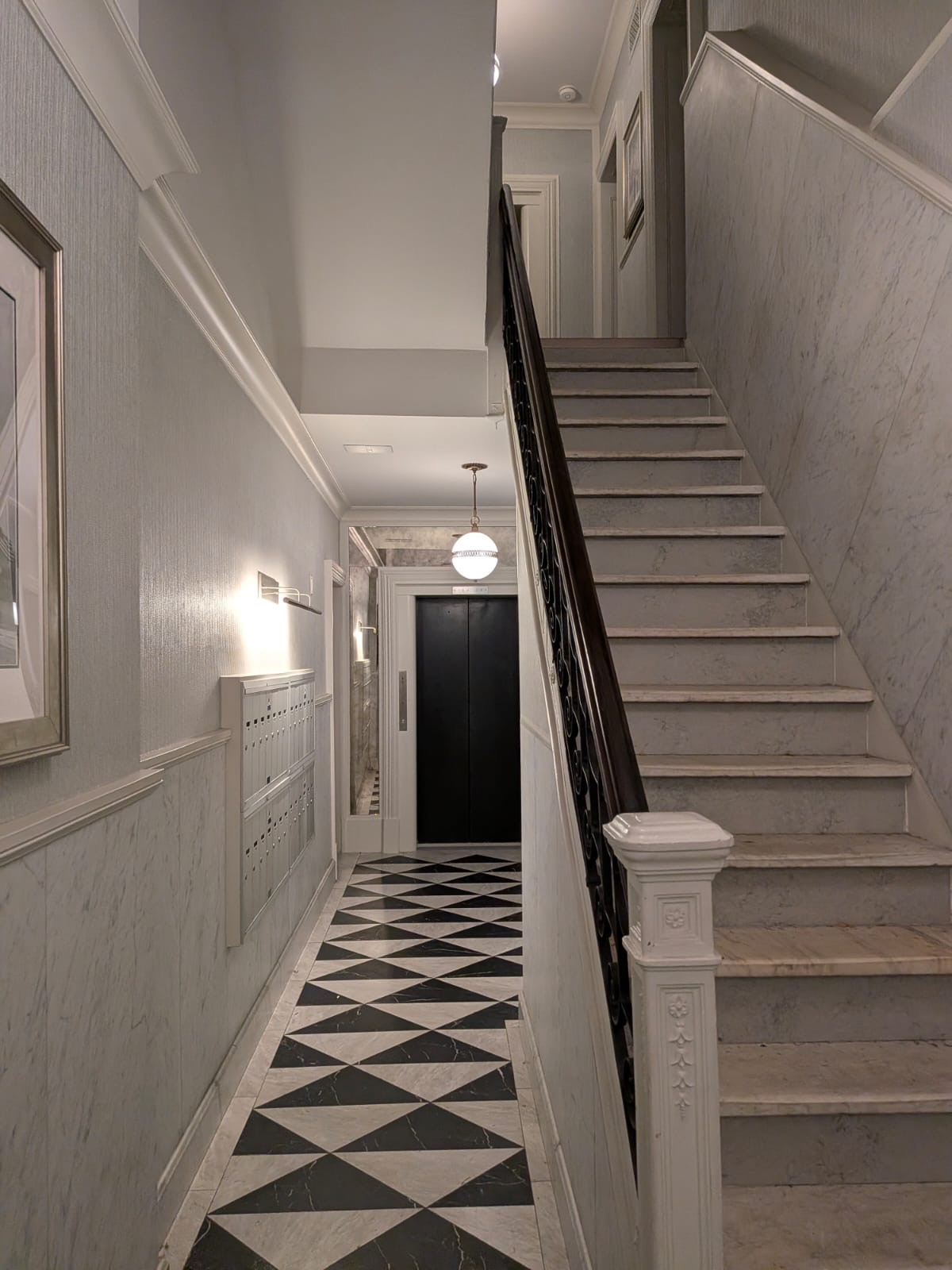
Lobby of the 444 East 58th Street building as of December 2025

== See also ==
- Sutton Place, Manhattan
- George F. Pelham
- Beaux-Arts architecture in New York City
- Architecture of New York City
- List of buildings, sites, and monuments in New York City
