= James Edwin Ruthven Carpenter Jr. =

American architect (1867–1932)

- Carpenter in 1932
- Born: January 7, 1867; Columbia, Tennessee, US
- Died: June 11, 1932 (aged 65); New York City, US
- Education: University of Tennessee; Massachusetts Institute of Technology; École des Beaux Arts
- Occupation: Architect

James Edwin Ruthven Carpenter Jr. (January 7, 1867 – June 11, 1932) was an American architect. He designed buildings in Nashville and Columbia, Tennessee as well as New York City apartment buildings. He also designed early skyscrapers in Atlanta, Georgia; Pensacola, Florida; and Philadelphia, Pennsylvania.

== Biography ==
Carpenter was born on January 7, 1867, in Columbia, Tennessee. He studied at the University of Tennessee and at the Massachusetts Institute of Technology, from which he graduated in 1884. He then studied at the École des Beaux Arts in Paris.

Carpenter worked in Nashville, Tennessee, in 1888; in Norfolk, Virginia, in 1890; and later in New York City. In 1892, he published an architecture book, Artistic Homes for City and Suburb. When working in Virginia and partnered with John Kevan Peebles, he designed the Epworth Methodist Episcopal Church at Norfolk (1894–1896). Working independently, he also designed Trinity United Methodist Church in Newport News, Virginia (1900).

Carpenter's first New York commission, in 1909, was for 116 East 58th Street, a nine-story apartment house, since demolished. His designs in Tennessee include the Columbia military arsenal (later the Columbia Military Academy), the Maury County courthouse in Columbia, Tennessee, the Kirkland Tower at Vanderbilt University, the Hermitage Hotel, Lynmeade Mansion and the Stahlman Building in Nashville, the Hurt Building in Atlanta, the American National Bank Building (Pensacola, Florida), and several noteworthy buildings in New York City, including 907 Fifth Avenue, 620 Park Avenue, 625 Park Avenue, 640 Park Avenue, 655 Park Avenue, 825 Fifth Avenue, 819 Park Avenue, 550 Park Avenue, completed in 1917, the neo-Italianate 1030 Fifth Avenue, built in 1925, and 1060 Park Avenue and the Lincoln Building (42nd Street, Manhattan), completed in 1930.

One distinctive aspect of Carpenter's work is his pairing of buildings: sibling structures facing each other across a side street, like 1115 and 1120 Fifth, at 93rd Street; 1148 and 1150 Fifth, at 96th Street; and 1165 and 1170 Fifth, at 98th Street.

Carpenter's work was described in a New York Times ad in 1930 as having a "quiet, restful feeling about [his] apartments — in their large, high-ceiling rooms, the careful finish of detail, the skilled but unobtrusive service."

== Personal life ==
On 9 February 1899, he married Marion Stires, who was born in December 1870 in Virginia or Georgia, a daughter of Van Rensselaer W. Stires and Letitia (née Milmore) Stires. She died on October 24, 1956, in New York City, survived by a grandson and two great-grandchildren. She was an art collector. Carpenter's death drew obituaries in the June 12, 1932, issue of the New York Times and the August 1932 issue of The Architectural Forum.

== Buildings ==
- Maury County Courthouse in Columbia, Tennessee
- Columbia Arsenal buildings, later used by Columbia Military Academy
- Kirkland Tower at Vanderbilt University
- Hermitage Hotel in Nashville
- Lynmeade Mansion in Nashville, a Change.org petition opposes a parking lot proposed on part of the property
- Stahlman Building in Nashville
- Hurt Building in Atlanta
- American National Bank Building in Pensacola, Florida
- 907 Fifth Avenue
- 620 Park Avenue
- 625 Park Avenue
- 640 Park Avenue
- 655 Park Avenue
- 825 Fifth Avenue
- 819 Park Avenue
- 550 Park Avenue, completed in 1917
- 1030 Fifth Avenue built in 1925
- 1060 Park Avenue
- Lincoln Building (One Grand Central Place) on 42nd Street completed in 1930
- Barclay Hotel (Philadelphia) (1928) in Philadelphia

== Bibliography ==
- Alpern, Andrew; Christopher Gray, preface. David Netto, foreword. The New York Apartment Houses of Rosario Candela and James Carpenter. New York: Acanthus Press, 2001. ISBN 978-0-926494-20-6

== See also ==
- Rosario Candela, an architect who designed apartment buildings in New York City
