= Hulda Lashanska =

American soprano (1893–1974)

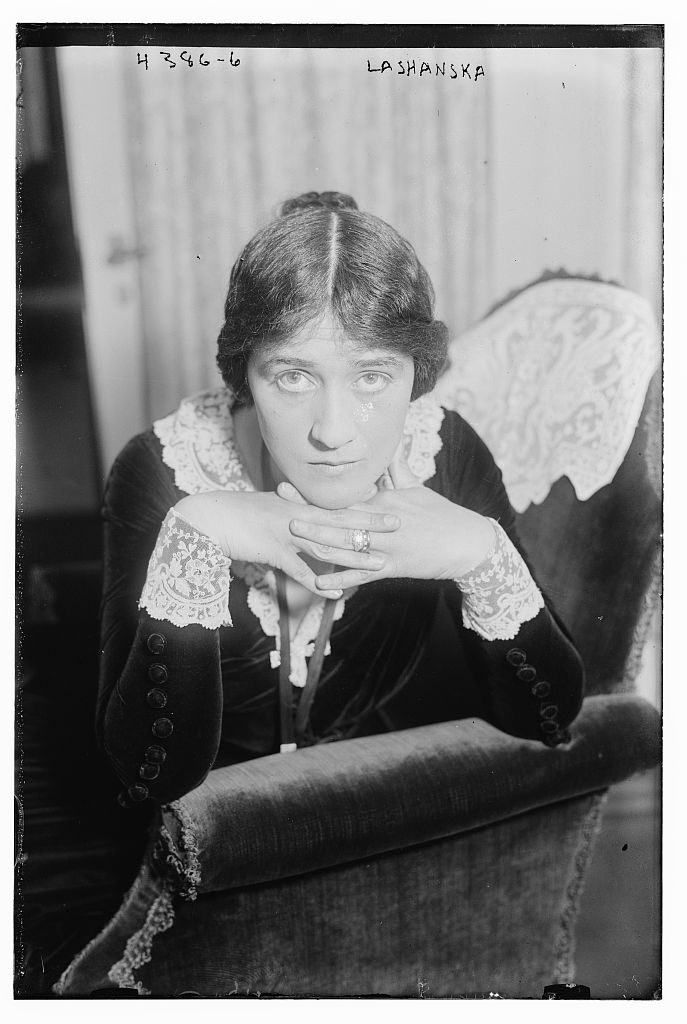
- Lashanska in 1917
- Born: March 15, 1893; Manhattan, New York City, United States
- Died: January 17, 1974 (aged 80); Manhattan, New York City, United States
- Other name: Hulda Rosenbaum
- Occupation: Lyric soprano
- Years active: 1910–1936
- Spouse: Harold A. Rosenbaum (m. 1913)
- Children: Lenore Lashanska (1914–?); Peggy Lashanska (1919–1998)
- Parent(s): Barbette and Henry Lashanska

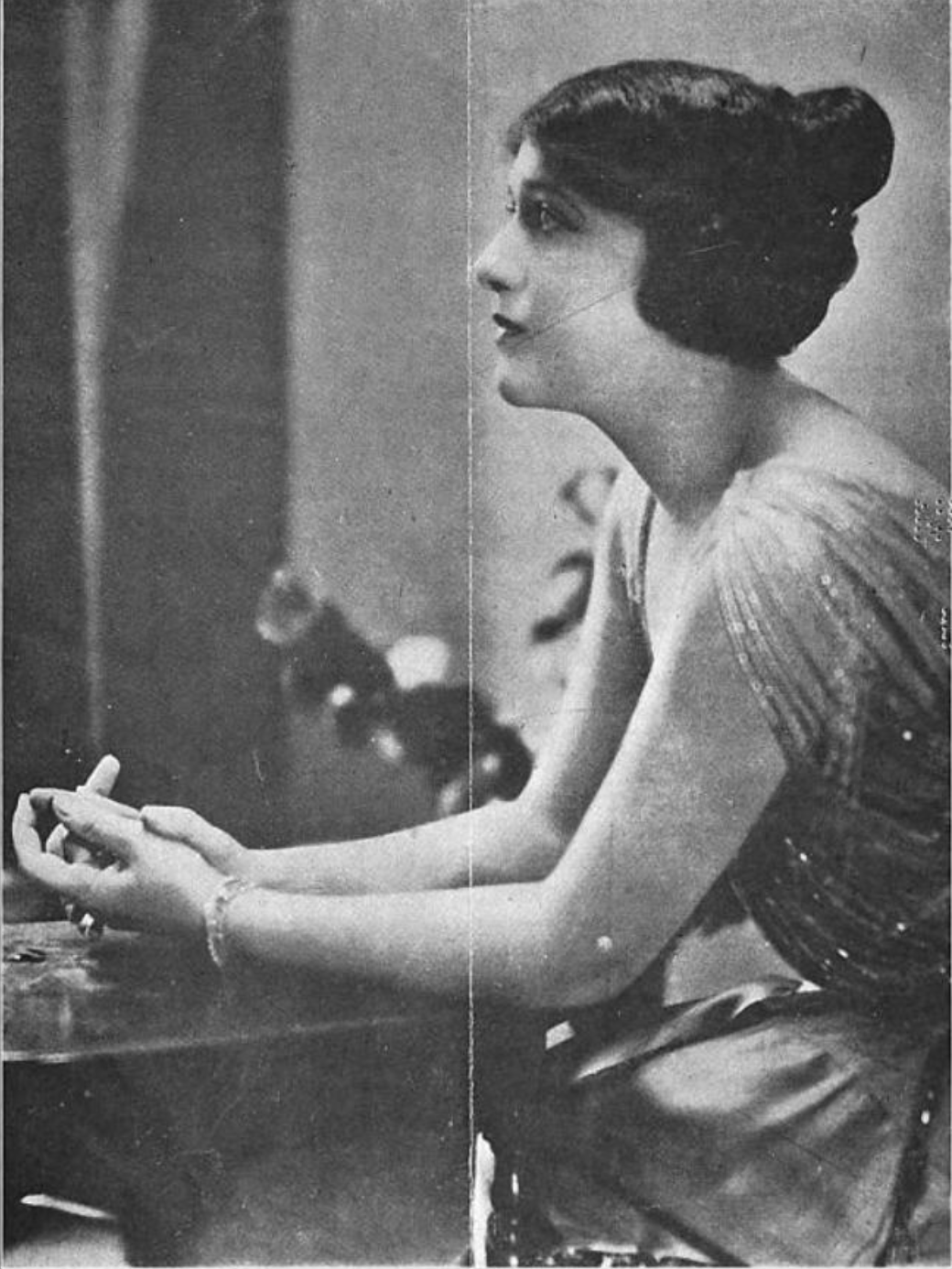
Lashanska in 1924

Hulda Lashanska (March 15, 1893 – January 17, 1974) was an American lyric soprano.

== Biography ==
Hulda Lashanska was the youngest of three daughters born to Henry and Barbette Lashanska (her siblings were Rosie and Lillian) in Manhattan, New York.

She studied singing with Frieda Ashforth and Marcella Sembrich. Before leaving for Europe to further her studies, Lashanska's recital debut took place on May 2, 1909, at the Lyceum Theatre in New York City, where she performed under the name "Hulda Lashan." A critic wrote "Lashanska's natural ability has been guided into proper channels by thorough instruction, and even now she sings with a measure of art and understanding very uncommon in a singer of her years and inexperience. She revealed an abundance of excellent artistic material, especially a voice of vibrant quality, rich in color, and a pronounced degree of musical and dramatic temperament." Organized by Alexander Lambert, the concert's purpose was to raise funds for Lashanska's continued studies abroad.

Her first song recital at Aeolian Hall took place on January 24, 1918. A critic remarked: "From Sembrich, who has taught her for two years, she has acquired not only the art of easy and pure tone production, but also the secrets of style and correct phrasing dependent largely, on her splendid breathing control. She is an oasis in the desert of voices." She first sang at Carnegie Hall in 1919.

"Madam Lashanska has a voice of pure and limpid beauty, artistic gifts of musicianship bestowed like the proverbial silver spoon, by the good fairies at her birth, and she has "the aristocratic note," quoted by Emma Eames.

Her only appearance at the Metropolitan Opera was at the eighteenth Sunday evening concert, March 17, 1918, where she sang "Depuis le jour" from Louise and three songs.

Lashanska first appeared with the New York Philharmonic on November 27, 1910, where she sang Franz Liszt's "Die Lorelei" with the orchestra conducted by Walter Damrosch. Her last appearance with the Philharmonic was November 22, 1936, at Lewisohn Stadium where she sang an aria by George Frideric Handel and songs by Hugo Wolf under conductor John Barbirolli. An unnamed critic wrote "Her singing merited praise for tonal quality and mellowness along with understanding of the moods of the music. Certain outstanding high notes were somewhat vibratory, but her voice was satisfactory in volume for the taxing requirements of outdoor performance and, for the most part, produced with ample fluency."

She died on January 17, 1974, at her home at 550 Park Avenue in Manhattan, at the age of 80.

== Personal ==
Hulda Lashanska married Harold Rosenbaum (born March 21, 1886) on March 27, 1913. He died on June 8, 1926. They had two daughters: Lenore and Peggy. In 1938, her daughter Peggy married Peter Gerald Lehman (1917-1944), son of Herbert H. Lehman, the 45th Governor of New York; he was killed while serving during World War II.
