= Maury County Courthouse =

Historic building in Columbia, Tennessee

Coordinates: 35°36′53″N 87°02′02″W

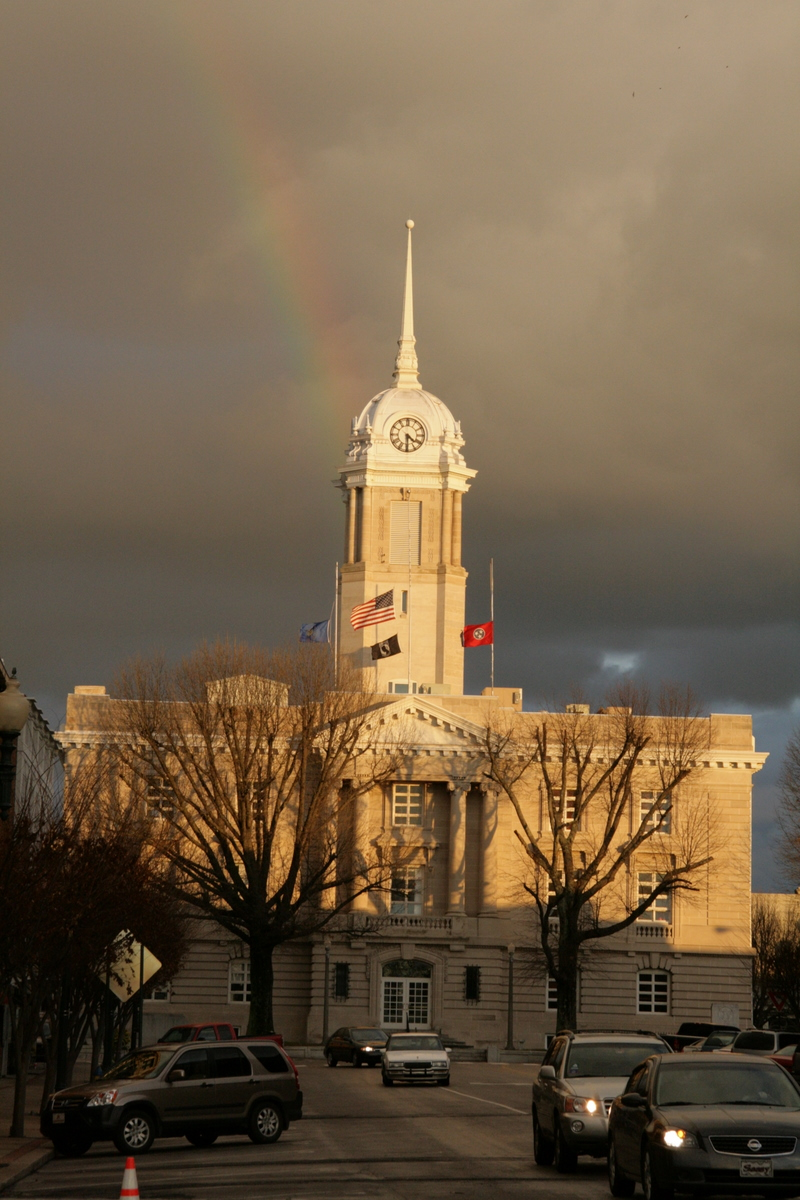

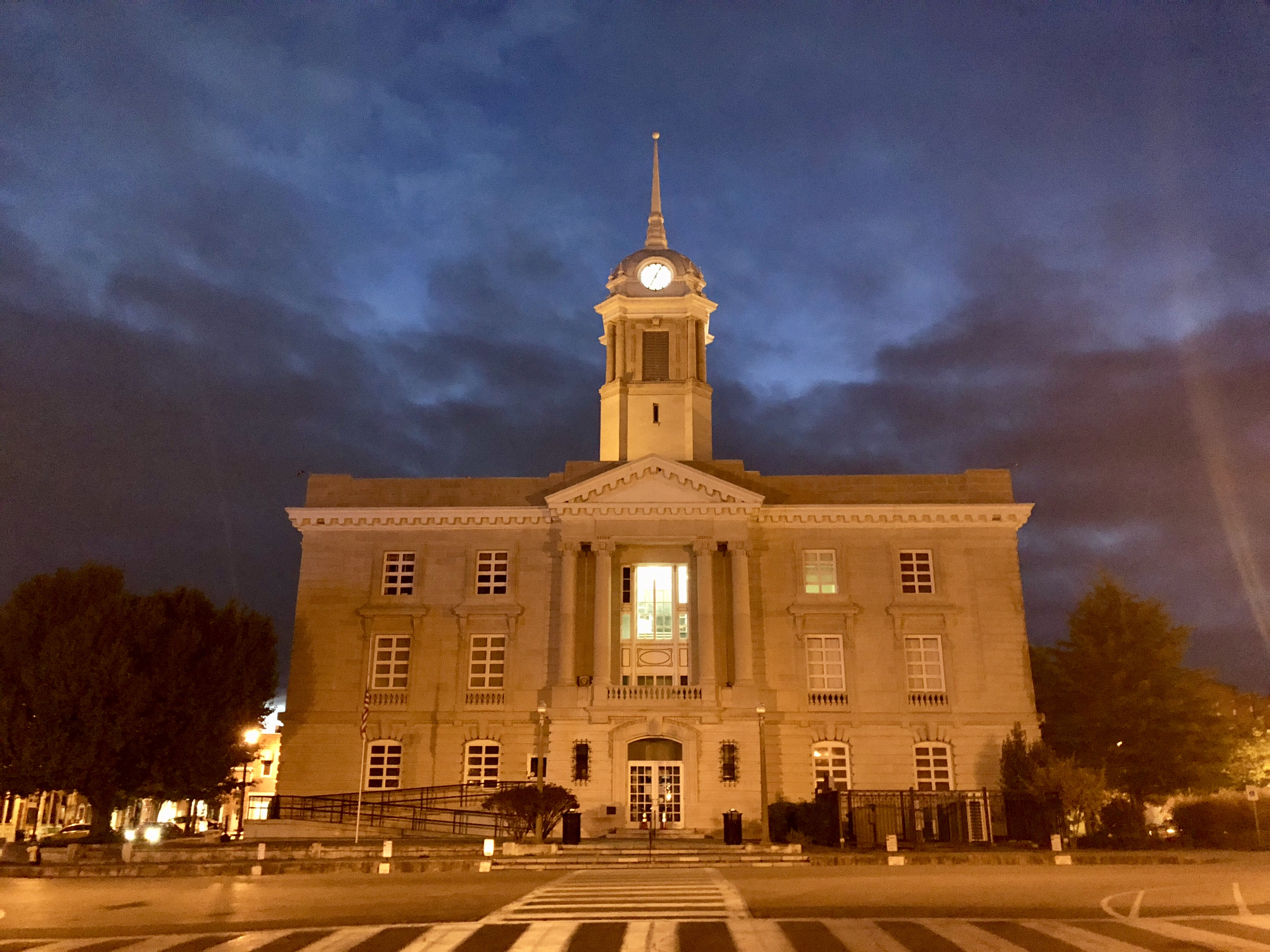

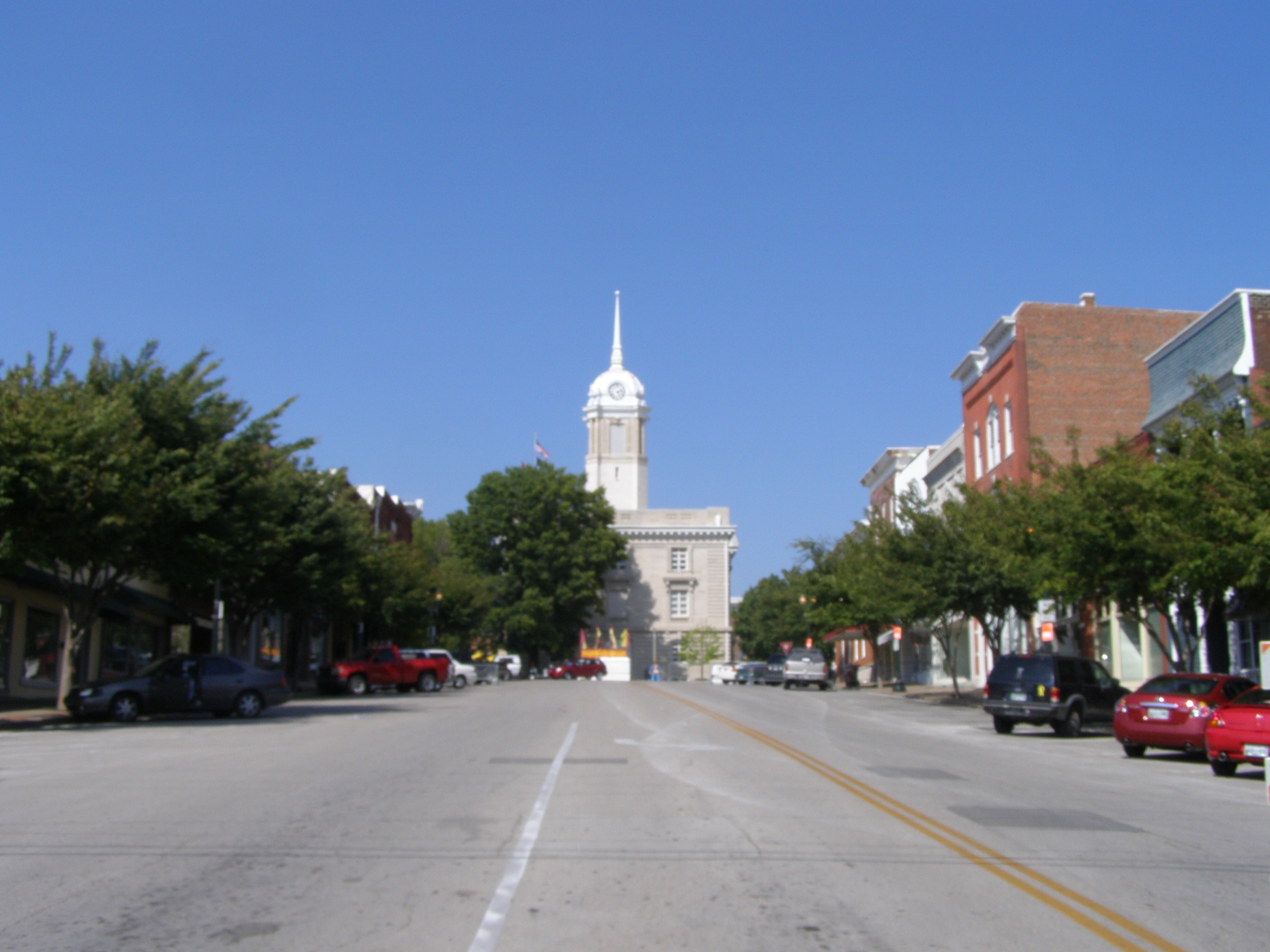

The Maury County Courthouse is a historic county courthouse building in Columbia, Tennessee, the county seat of Maury County. James Edwin Ruthven Carpenter Jr. was its architect.

The courthouse is where Henry Choate was hanged in 1927 after being lynched. The courthouse was also a rallying place for the Columbia race riot of 1946.

A new cupola was planned as part of renovations to the then 98-year-old courthouse in 1998.

It has been the site of filming projects, including the music video for Jason Aldean's controversial "Try That in a Small Town". "We Were Rich" by Runaway June was filmed in Columbia and includes the courthouse as a backdrop.
