= American National Bank Building (Pensacola, Florida) =

- U.S. National Register of Historic Places
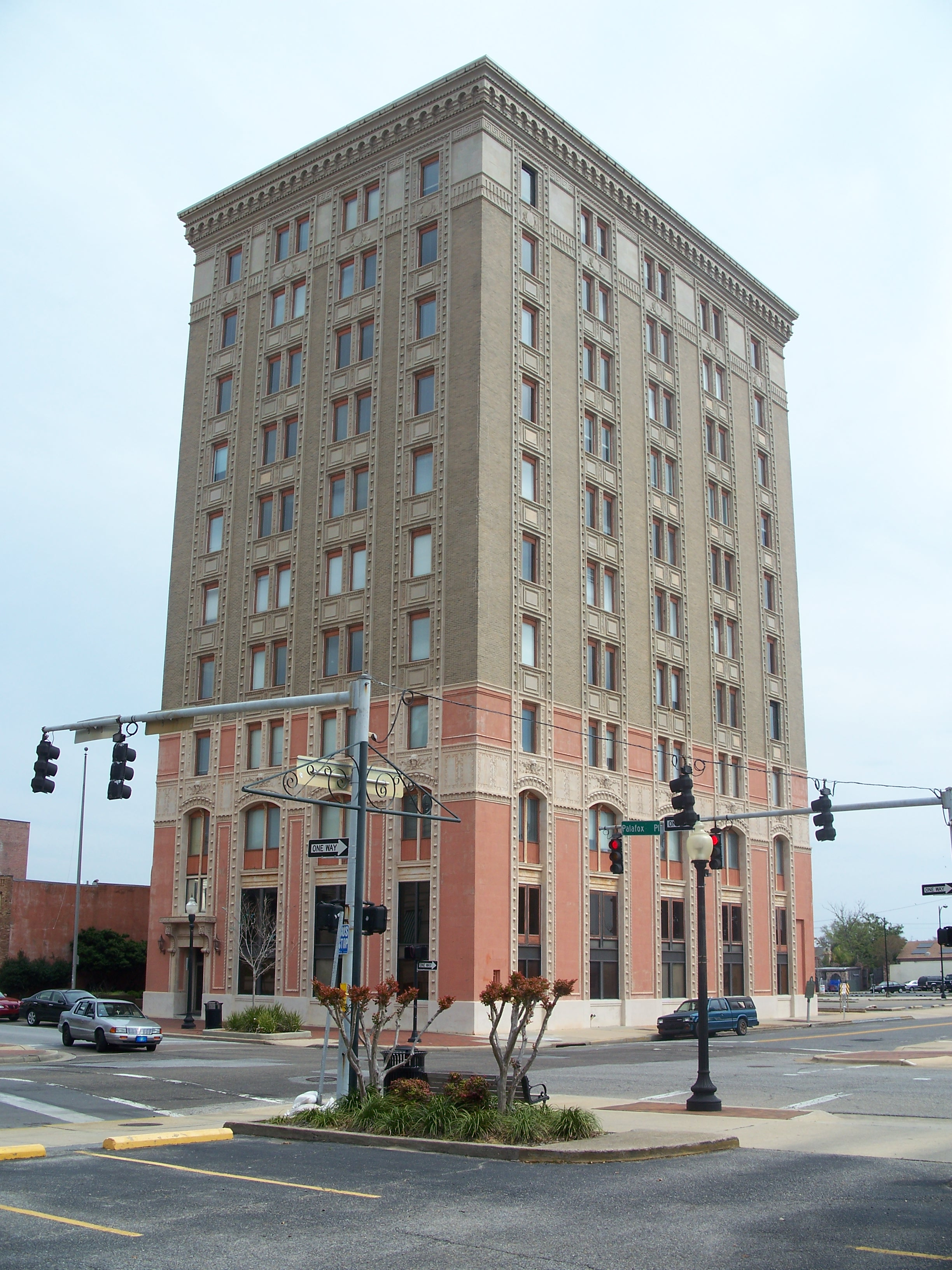

- Location within Florida Location within the United States
- Interactive map showing the location of American National Bank Building
- Location: 226 South Palafox Street, Pensacola, Florida
- Coordinates: 30°24′33.53″N 87°12′52.46″W
- Built: 1908
- Architect: J. E. R. Carpenter
- Architectural style: Chicago school
- NRHP reference No.: 78000940
- Added to NRHP: November 17, 1978

The American National Bank Building (also known as the Florida National Bank Building, the Seville Tower or Empire Building) is a historic bank in Pensacola, Florida, United States. On November 17, 1978, it was added to the U.S. National Register of Historic Places. It was designed by New York architect J. E. R. Carpenter.

== History ==
The tower was erected in 1910 at a cost of $250,000. It was the tallest building in Florida at the time of its completion, and remained the tallest in the City of Pensacola until 1974. The building was added to the National Register of Historic Places on 17 November 1978. Its location on the northeast corner of Palafox and Government Streets, is also the site of the first telephone exchange in Florida with exclusive operating rights, established by Southern Bell on September 1, 1880, and serving 31 telephones. Seville Tower is currently used as office space.
