= Sutton Place, Manhattan =

Avenue and neighborhood in Manhattan, New York

Sutton Place
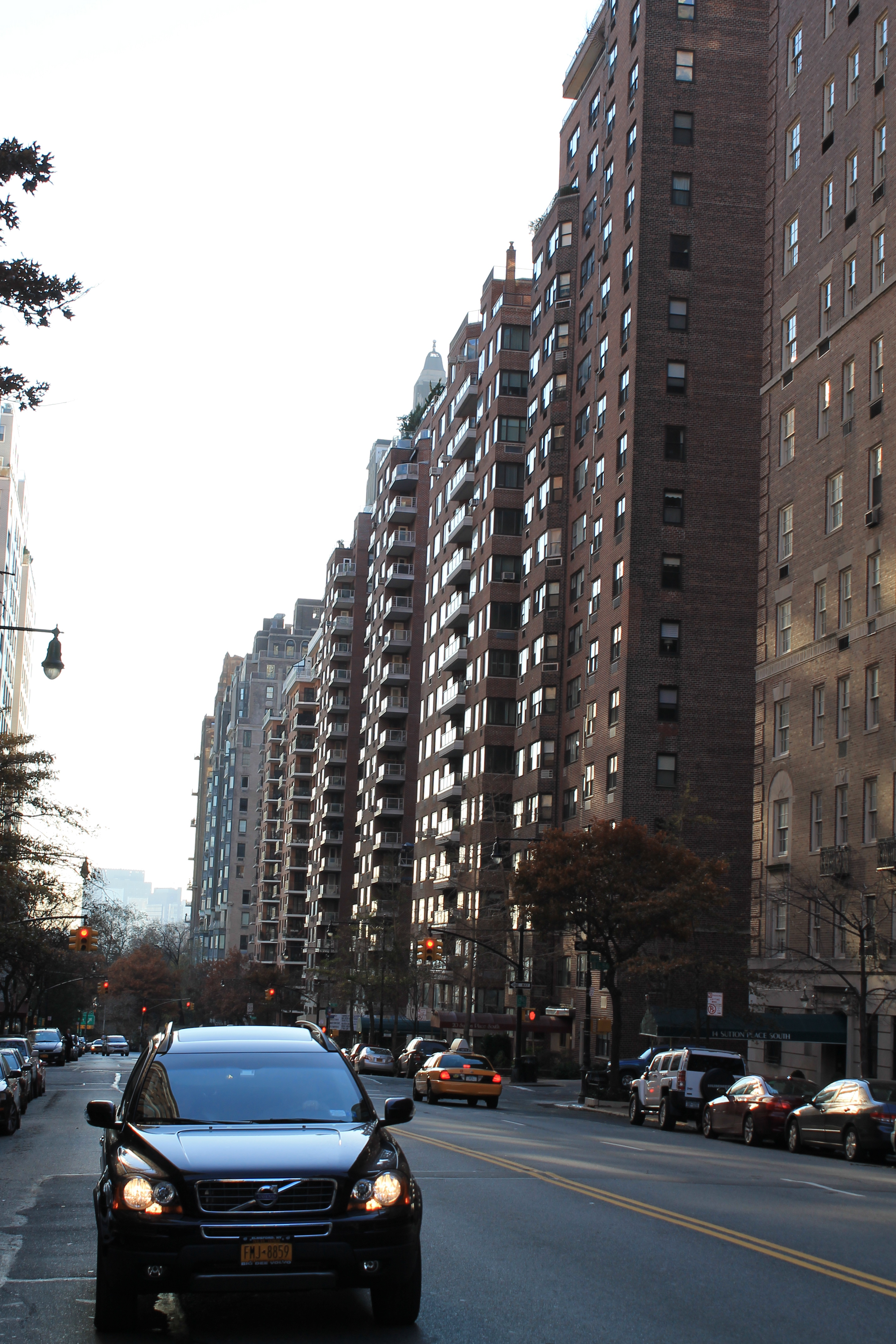
- Buildings on Sutton Place
- Interactive map of Sutton Place
- Owner: City of New York
- Maintained by: NYCDOT
- Length: 2 mi (3.2 km)
- Location: Manhattan, New York City
- Coordinates: 40.758094°N 73.960180°W
- South end: 53rd Street in Midtown East
- Major junctions: FDR Drive in Lenox Hill
- North end: 59th Street in Midtown East
- East: FDR Drive
- West: First Avenue

Construction
- Commissioned: March 1811
- Sutton Place Historic District
- U.S. National Register of Historic Places
- U.S. Historic district
- Location within Manhattan Location within New York City Location within New York
- Location: 1–21 Sutton Pl. & 4–16 Sutton Sq., New York, New York
- Coordinates: 40°45′28″N 73°57′57″W
- Area: less than one acre
- Built: 1920
- Architectural style: Colonial Revival, Georgian revival
- NRHP reference No.: 85002294
- Added to NRHP: September 12, 1985

Sutton Place is a short avenue and a neighborhood on the East Side of Manhattan, in New York City. Sutton Place and Sutton Place South run through their namesake neighborhood along the East River and south of the Queensboro Bridge. Sutton Place South runs from 57th to 53rd Streets. Unlike most north–south streets in Manhattan, building address numbers along Sutton Place South increase when headed south. Sutton Place runs from 57th to 59th Streets. The greater Sutton Place neighborhood is considered among the city's most affluent, and is known for upscale apartments, townhouses and historic landmarks, much like the Upper East Side. Part of the neighborhood comprises the Sutton Place Historic District, listed on the National Register of Historic Places.

Addresses on Sutton Place and Sutton Place South do not follow the usual pattern in Manhattan. North of 59th Street, Sutton Place becomes York Avenue.

The greater Sutton Place neighborhood, which sits north of the neighborhood of Turtle Bay, runs from 53rd Street to 59th Street and is bounded on the east by the East River and on the west by either First Avenue or Second Avenue. Sutton Square is the cul-de-sac at the end of East 58th Street, just east of Sutton Place; Riverview Terrace is a row of townhouses on a short private driveway that runs north from Sutton Square.

== History ==
=== 19th century ===
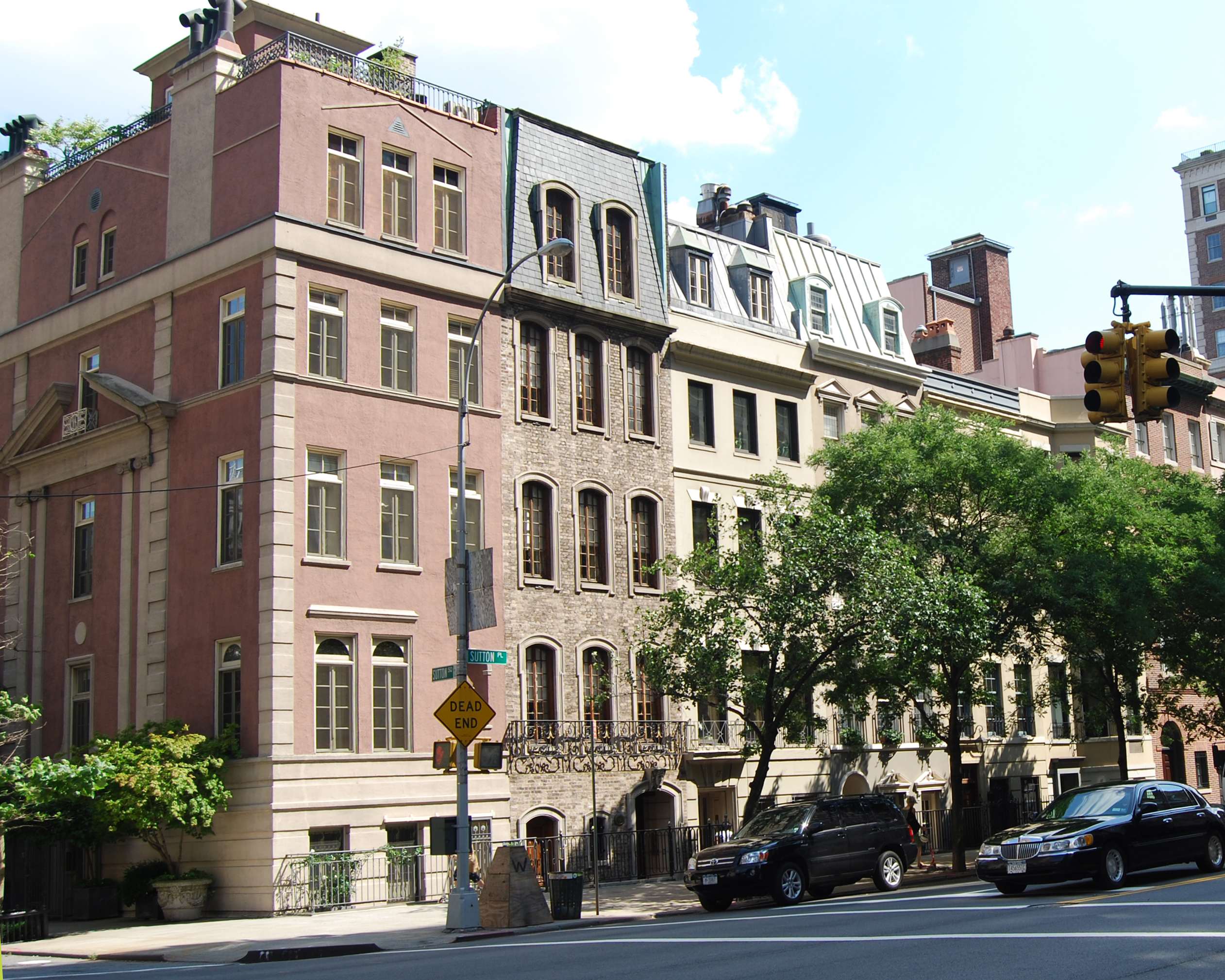
Townhouses line the east side of Sutton Place between 58th and 57th Streets

The street that became Sutton Place was proposed as an addition to the Commissioners' Plan of 1811 for Manhattan, which designated 12 broad north–south avenues running the length of the island. The geography of Manhattan left a large area on the Upper East Side east of First Avenue without a major north–south thoroughfare, so Avenue A was added to compensate. Sutton Place, the name that applied to the whole street at the time, was originally one of several disconnected stretches of Avenue A built where space allowed, east of First Avenue.

In 1875, Effingham B. Sutton constructed a group of brownstones between 57th and 58th Streets. The earliest source found by The New York Times using the term Sutton Place dates to 1883. At that time, the New York City Board of Aldermen approved a petition to change the name from "Avenue A" to "Sutton Place", covering the blocks between 57th and 60th Streets.

=== 1900 to 1929 ===
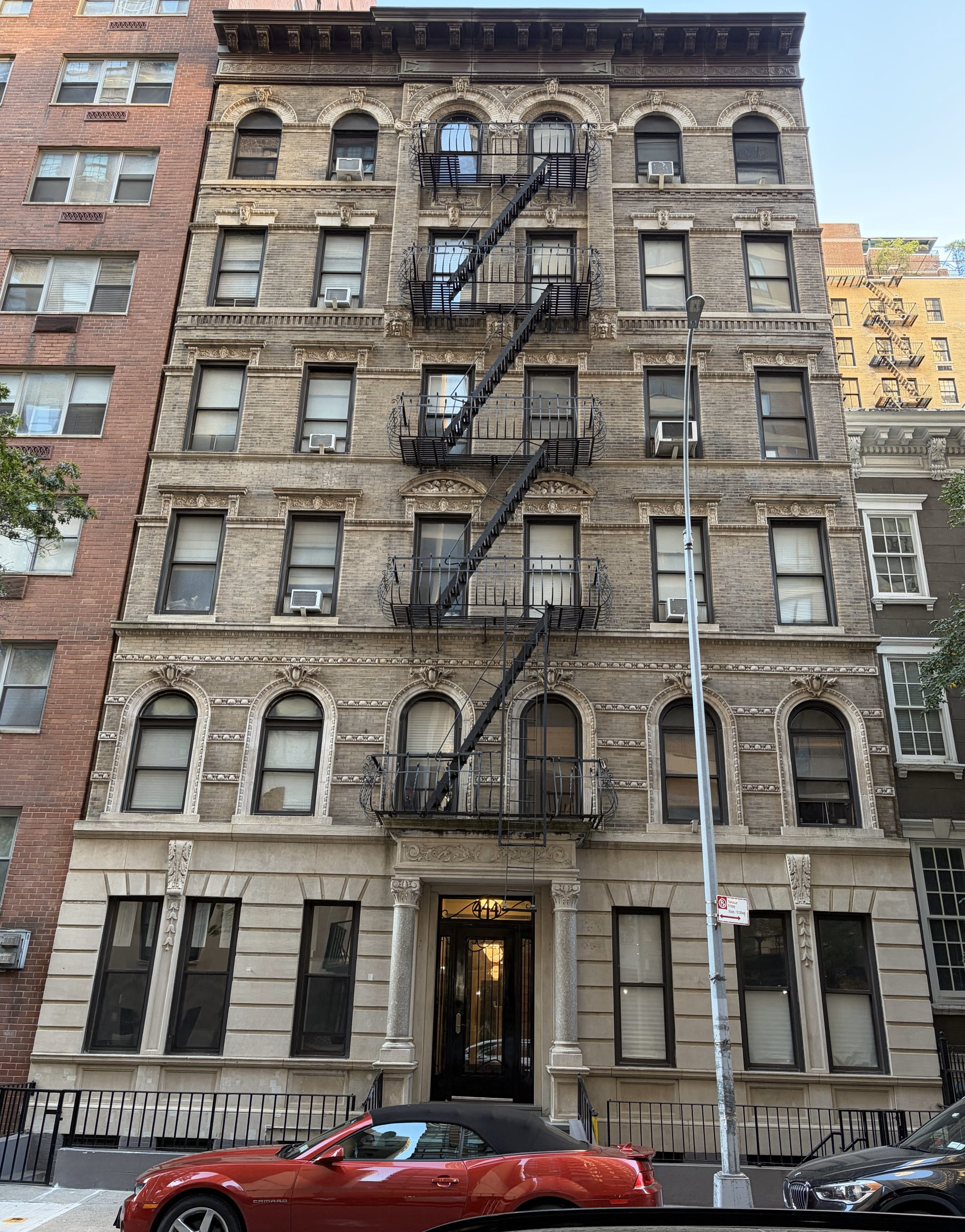
444 East 58th Street, an example 1901 building in Sutton Place

At the turn of the 20th century new taller 6-floor apartment buildings started to be built in the neighborhood, with two surviving Beaux Arts architecture styled buildings designed by George F. Pelham still in place: 422 East 58th Street from 1900 and 444 East 58th Street from 1901.

Sutton Place first became fashionable around 1920, when several wealthy socialites, including Anne Harriman Vanderbilt and Anne Morgan, built townhouses on the eastern side of the street, overlooking the East River. Both townhouses were designed by Mott B. Schmidt, launching a career that included many houses for the wealthy. Very shortly thereafter, developers started to build grand co-operative apartment houses on Sutton Place and Sutton Place South, including several designed by Rosario Candela such as One Sutton Place South, 4 Sutton Place, 14 Sutton Place South, and 30 Sutton Place. Stonehenge 58 designed by George F. Pelham in 1928 is also a notable building from that era.

In 1928, a one-block section of Sutton Place north of 59th Street, and all of Avenue A north of that point, was renamed York Avenue to honor U.S. Army Sergeant Alvin York, who received the Medal of Honor during World War I's Meuse-Argonne Offensive.

Lafayette A. Goldstone designed 444 East 57th Street. The 14-story condominium building was completed in 1929, and was later home to Marilyn Monroe and playwright Arthur Miller. Cox and Holden designed 333 East 57th Street, one of the oldest co-op buildings in Sutton Place, with interiors designed by Dorothy Draper. This white glove co-op was home to American author E.L. Doctorow and is now designated a New York State Literary Landmark by the American Library Association.

Development in Sutton Place came to an abrupt halt with the Great Depression.

=== 1930 to 1945 ===
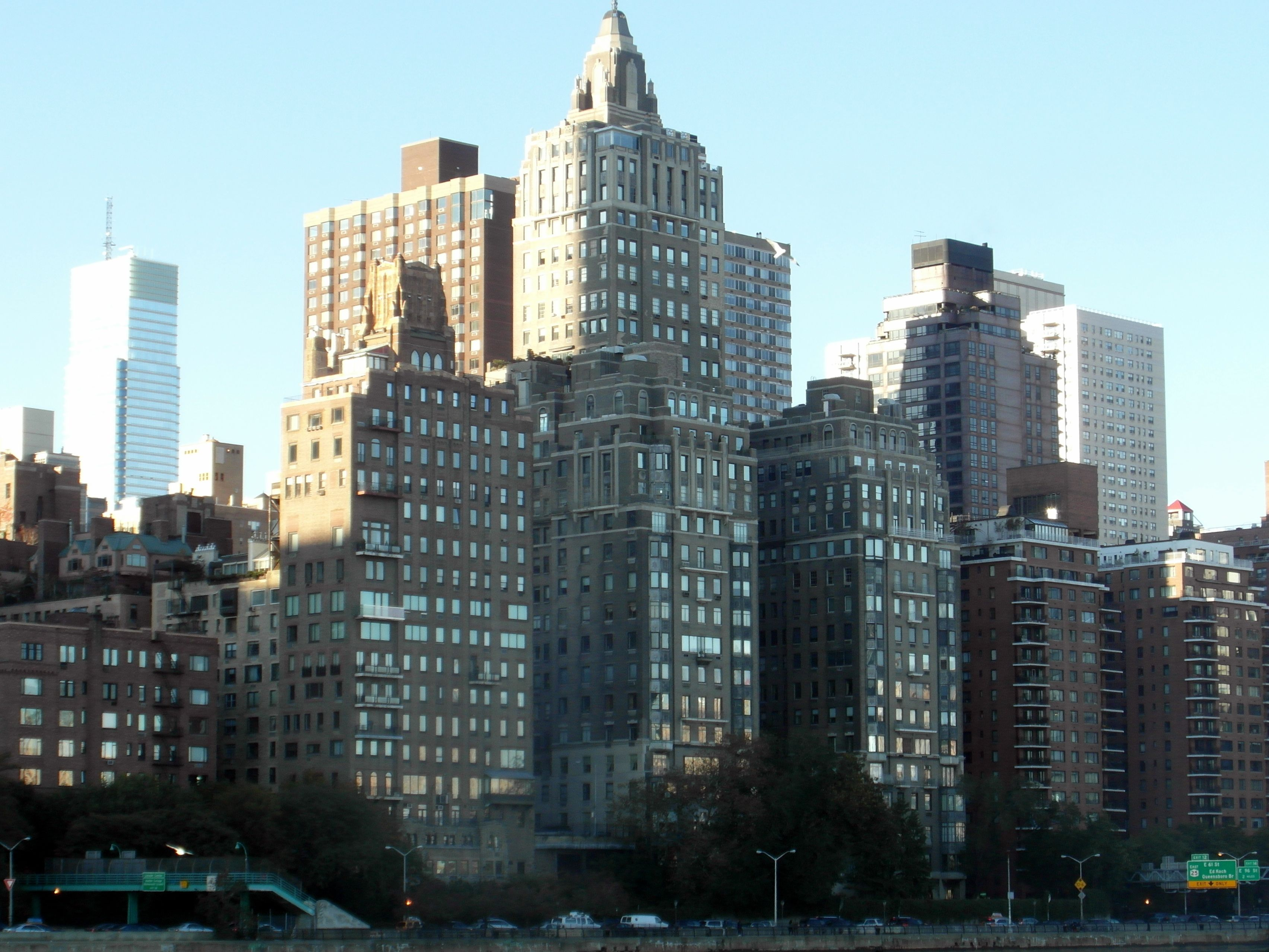
River House, Art-Deco Sutton Place building designed in 1929, construction completed in 1931

The 26-story River House was architected in 1929 and constructed in 1931 on the site of a former cigar factory and designed by William Lawrence Bottomley in the Art Deco style.

In 1938 Emery Roth designed 2 Sutton Place South.

=== After World War II ===
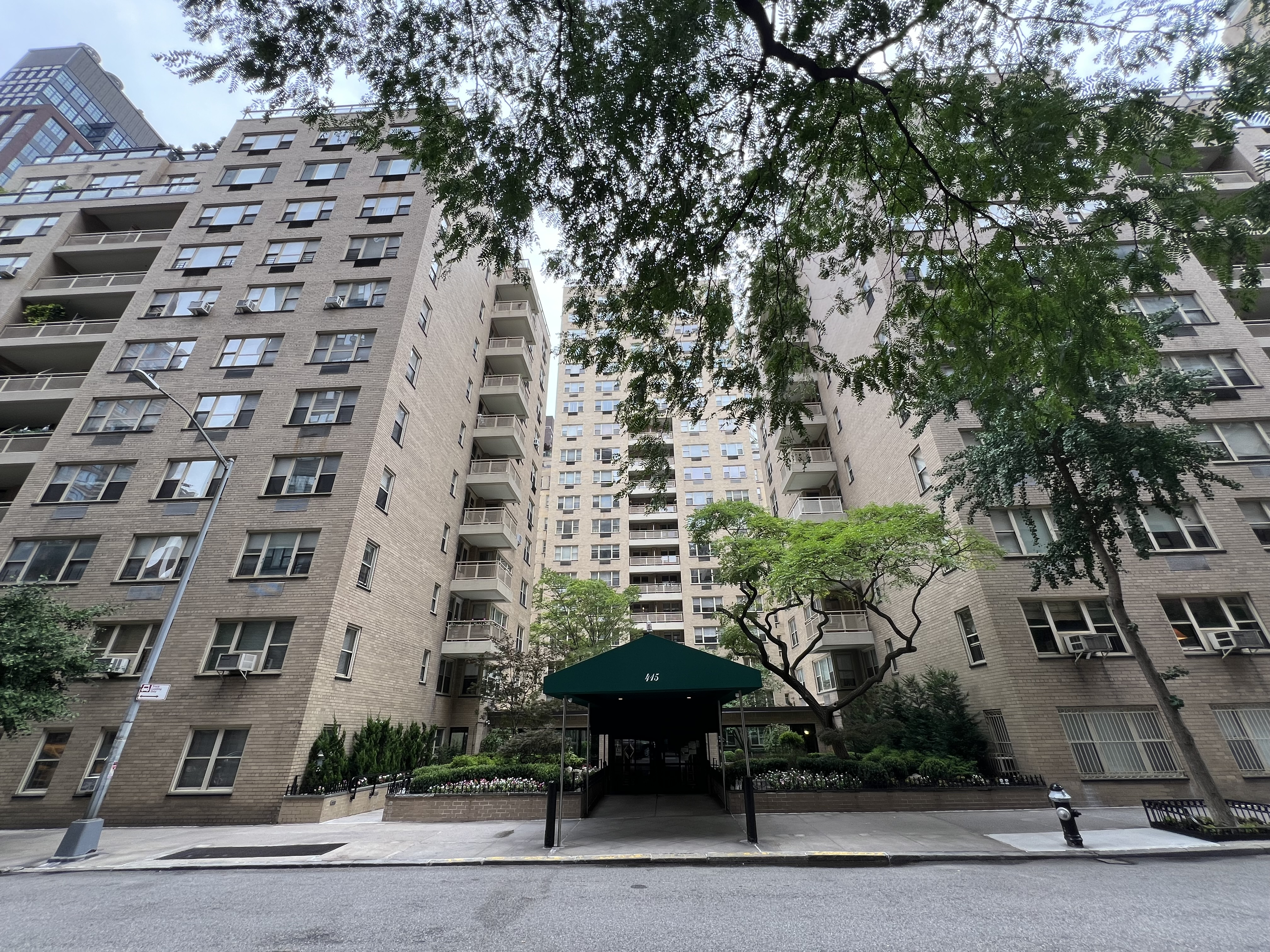
Sutton House, a typical post-war Sutton Place building

The luxury apartment buildings on the lower part of Sutton Place South (below 57th Street) and the northernmost part of Sutton Place (adjacent to the Queensboro Bridge) were not developed until the 1940s and 1950s. These include:

- 1947 300 East 57th Street by Emery Roth (though designed in 1944).
- 1956 Sutton House by John M. Kokkins and Stephen C. Lyras
- 1983 St. James Tower by Emery Roth & Sons
- 2022 Sutton 58 by Thomas Juul-Hansen

=== Park controversy ===
Sutton Place encompasses two public parks overlooking the East River, one at the end of 57th Street and another at the end of 53rd Street. The 57th Street park, named Sutton Place Park, is separated by an iron fence from the landscaped grounds behind One Sutton Place South, a neo-Georgian apartment building designed by Rosario Candela. The property behind One Sutton Place South was the subject of a dispute between the building's owners and the New York City Department of Parks and Recreation. Like the adjacent park, the rear garden at One Sutton Place South is, in fact, cantilevered over the FDR Drive, a busy parkway at Manhattan's eastern edge that is not visible from most of Sutton Place.

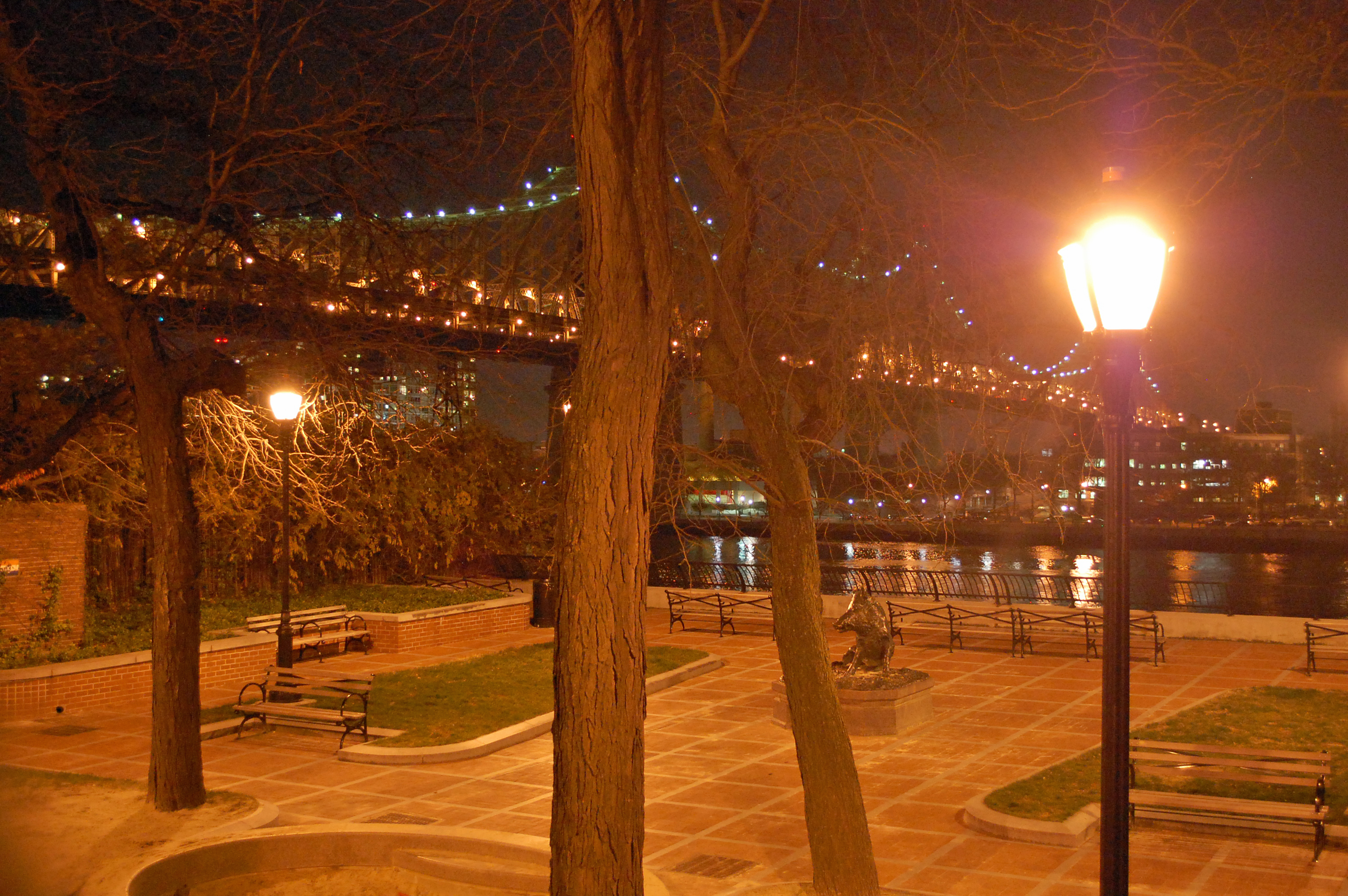
Sutton Place Park at the end of 57th Street, with the Queensboro Bridge in the background

In 1939, city authorities took ownership of the property behind One Sutton Place South by eminent domain in connection with the construction of the FDR Drive, then leased it back to the building for $1 a year. The building's lease for its backyard expired in 1990. The co-op tried unsuccessfully to extend the lease, and later made prospective apartment-buyers review the legal status of the backyard and sign a confidentiality agreement. In June 2007, the co-op sued the city in an attempt the keep the land, and on November 1, 2011, the co-op and the city reached an agreement in which the co-op ended its ownership claim to the eastern 6,000 square feet and the city relinquished its claim to the western 4,000 square feet (the land closest to the building). Each side also agreed to contribute $1 million toward the creation of a public park on the city's portion.

== Notable residents ==
Former and current residents of Sutton Place include architect I. M. Pei; socialite Consuelo Vanderbilt Balsan of the Vanderbilt family; French-American writer, journalist and pianist Eve Curie; cabaret singer and pianist Bobby Short; rock stars Freddie Mercury and Michael Jackson; actor Peter Lawford and his wife Patricia Kennedy Lawford of the Kennedy family; Ziegfeld Girl and businesswoman Irene Hayes; actresses Lillian Gish, Joan Crawford, Mildred Natwick, Maureen O'Hara, Sigourney Weaver, and Marilyn Monroe and her then-husband Arthur Miller; actress and interior decorator Elsie de Wolfe and actress, fashion designer and socialite C. Z. Guest; clothing designers Bill Blass and Kenneth Cole and interior designer Valerian Rybar; shipping magnate Aristotle Onassis; banker Richard Jenrette; hedge fund manager Raj Rajaratnam; Steven Hoffenberg, founder of Towers Financial Corporation, a debt collection agency; John Fairchild, publisher of Women's Wear Daily; politician and business leader Percy Sutton; "Preppy Killer" Robert Chambers and his ex-girlfriend, Shawn Kovell; former New York Governor Mario Cuomo; and all UN Secretaries-General since Kurt Waldheim.

== Points of interest ==
One Sutton Place North, a townhouse at the northeast corner of Sutton Place (dead end) and East 57th Street, was built as a residence for Anne Harriman Vanderbilt, widow of William K. Vanderbilt. Next door, the official residence of the Secretary-General of the United Nations is a four-story brick townhouse that was built in 1921 for Anne Morgan, daughter of financier J.P. Morgan, and donated as a gift to the United Nations in 1972 by industrialist Arthur A. Houghton Jr. The Secretary's home is 0.6 miles (0.97 km) from the UN Headquarters. These townhouses have a park at the rear with FDR Drive running below (Sutton Place Tunnel) along the East River.

=== Historic district ===
In 1985, some buildings in the neighborhood (1–21 Sutton Place and 4–16 Sutton Square) were added to the National Register of Historic Places as the Sutton Place Historic District. Twelve houses, along with a communal back garden adjoining each house, are contributing properties to the district; there are also four non-contributing properties. The houses are all four to five stories tall, with brick or stucco exteriors; in contrast to the apartment buildings along the rest of Sutton Place, each house is a single-family residence. The contributing buildings were developed in the early 1920s and originally housed figures such as designer Elsie de Wolfe, philanthropist Anne Morgan, and heiress Anne Harriman Vanderbilt. The houses' communal garden, Sutton Place Park along 57th Street, includes a lawn with trees and other plantings. About one-third of the original garden was demolished and replaced when FDR Drive was built under it (see § Park controversy).

== See also ==
- National Register of Historic Places listings in Manhattan from 14th to 59th Streets
