= Epworth United Methodist Church (Norfolk, Virginia) =

Historic church in Virginia, United States

- U.S. National Register of Historic Places
- Virginia Landmarks Register
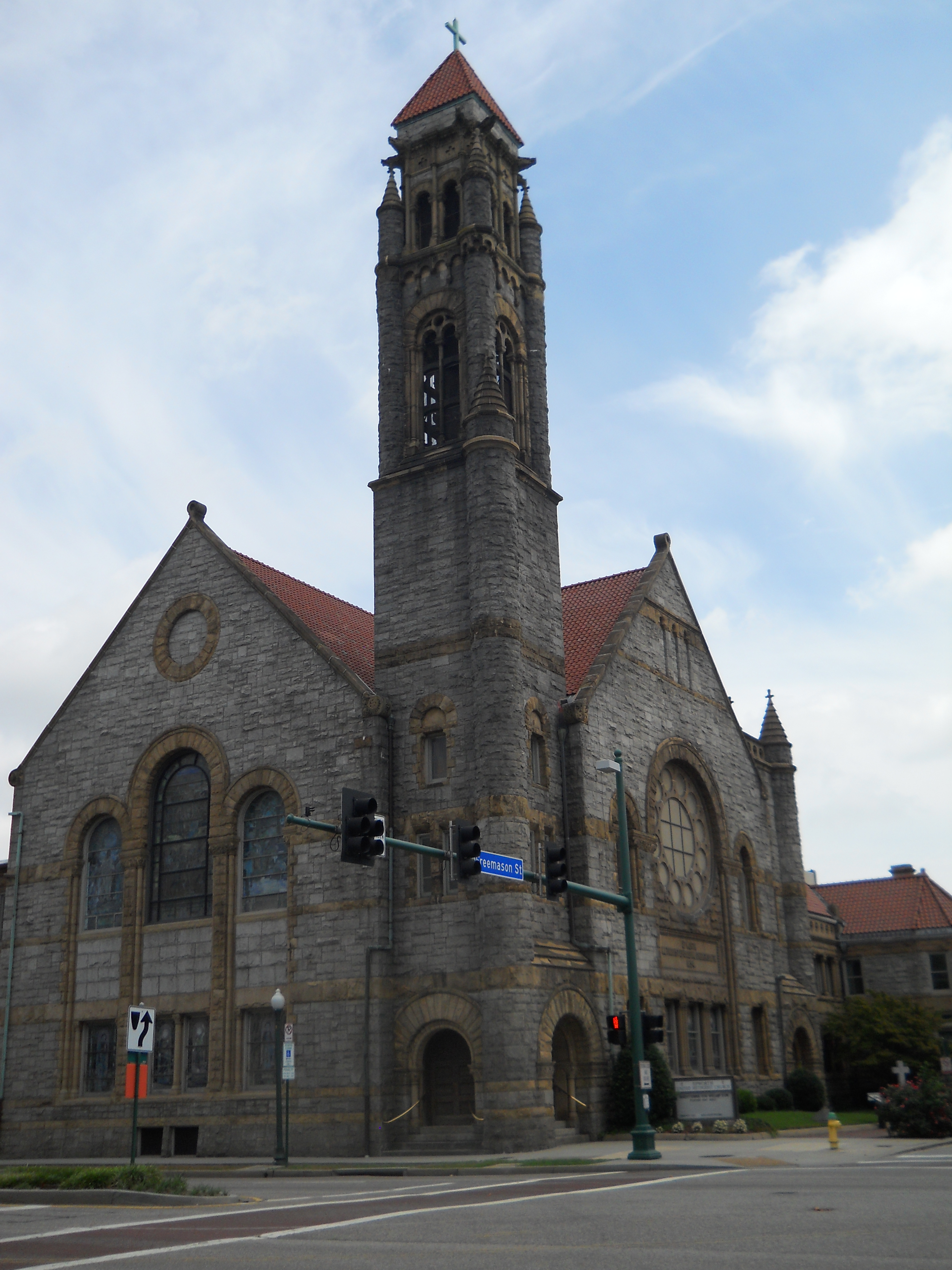
- Epworth United Methodist Church, September 2013

- Location within Virginia Location within the United States
- Location: 124 W. Freemason St., Norfolk, Virginia
- Coordinates: 36°51′6″N 76°17′29″W
- Area: 1.5 acres (0.61 ha)
- Built: 1894-1896
- Architect: Carpenter, John Ruthven; Peebles, John Kevan
- Architectural style: Late Victorian, Romanesque
- NRHP reference No.: 97000955
- VLR No.: 122-0178

Significant dates
- Added to NRHP: August 21, 1997
- Designated VLR: March 20, 1996

Epworth United Methodist Church, originally Epworth Methodist Episcopal Church, South is a historic Methodist church located in Downtown Norfolk, Virginia. It was designed by two noted Virginia architects James Edwin Ruthven Carpenter, Jr. (1867-1932) and John Kevan Peebles (1876-1934), and built between 1894 and 1896. It is a rusticated granite with yellow sandstone trim church building in the Richardsonian Romanesque style. The original building is divided into three sections: the cruciform sanctuary, the social hall and classrooms, and the pastor's study. The building features 22 stained glass windows, most notably the Ascension flanked by two Tiffany windows. It has a bell tower topped by a pyramidal red tile roof. The church was remodeled to its present appearance in 1921.

It was listed on the National Register of Historic Places in 1997.

== History ==
The church's origins date from 1850 with Granby Street Methodist Episcopal Church, South. Its founders were members of Cumberland Street Methodist Episcopal Church, South, and the original building was at the corner of Granby and Freemason Streets.

In 1890, the organization voted to construct a new sanctuary to minister the needs of the growing congregation and community. Three years later, a groundbreaking ceremony was held to select the name of the new building. On Jan. 19, 1896, the new church was dedicated with the name Epworth honoring the boyhood home of John Wesley, founder of Methodism.

== Status ==
After years of declining attendance, the church held its last service on January 5, 2025. As of October 2026, future uses of the building have not been determined.
