= 550 Park Avenue =

Apartment building in Manhattan, New York

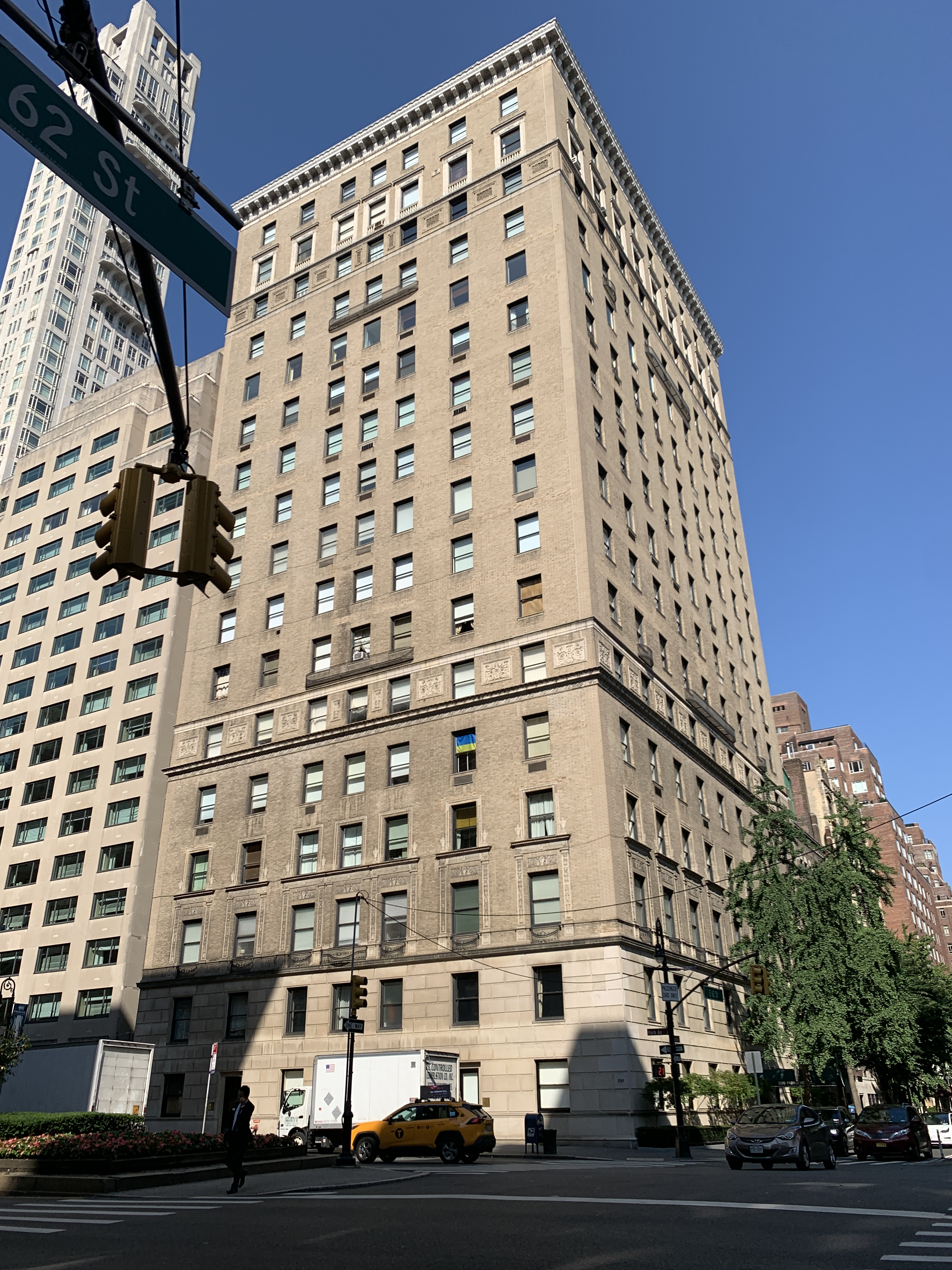
- Interactive map of the 550 Park Avenue area

General information
- Status: Completed
- Type: Residential
- Architectural style: Neo-classicism
- Location: 54-60 East 62nd Street, Manhattan, New York, United States
- Coordinates: 40.7648°N 73.9689°W
- Construction started: May 24, 1916
- Completed: December 11, 1917
- Owner: 550 PARK AVE CORP

Height
- Antenna spire: 67.06 metres (220.0 ft)
- Roof: 64.01 metres (210.0 ft)

Technical details
- Floor count: 17

Design and construction
- Architect: J.E.R. Carpenter

550 Park Avenue is a luxury apartment building on Park Avenue on the Upper East Side of Manhattan, New York City, United States.

550 Park Avenue was designed by J.E.R. Carpenter. The 17-floor building was completed on December 11, 1917 and converted to a cooperative in 1952 with only 32 apartments. It sits next to the Browning School.

== Notable residents ==
Notable residents have included:

- August Belmont Jr., financier
- James Edwin Ruthven Carpenter Jr., architect of the building
- Barbara Goldsmith, author, journalist, and philanthropist
- Hulda Lashanska, soprano singer
- Samuel D. Leidesdorf, accountant
- Jesse Livermore, stock market operator known as the "Boy Plunger of Wall Street"
- Kathryn Bache Miller, philanthropist
- Diana Vreeland, fashion columnist and editor
