= 625 Park Avenue =

Apartment building in Manhattan, New York

- Interactive map of the 625 Park Avenue area

General information
- Type: Housing cooperative
- Location: 625 Park Avenue, Manhattan, New York, U.S.
- Coordinates: 40.7667°N 73.9666°W
- Construction started: 1929
- Completed: 1931

Height
- Height: 155 feet (47 m)

Technical details
- Floor count: 13

Design and construction
- Architect: James Edwin Ruthven Carpenter, Jr.

625 Park Avenue is a co-op residential building on the Upper East Side of Manhattan in New York City, at the intersection of East 65th Street and Park Avenue. It is noted for its spacious residences, triplex penthouse, and well-known residents.

The building was designed by architect James Edwin Ruthven Carpenter Jr., often known as "J.E.R. Carpenter". Carpenter has many designs on the avenue, (including 620 Park Avenue across Park Avenue,) and together with Rosario Candela is considered among its primary influencers. 625 Park Avenue was developed in 1929 by banker Louis Graveraet Kaufman, who would later occupy an apartment in the building. The building is 13 stories tall and houses a total of 32 units.

== Triplex ==
The three-floor penthouse has been home to large collections and decoration schemes. Helena Rubinstein decorated the unit with elevated absurdism. Cosmetics rival, Charles Revson, of Revlon, bought the unit upon Rubinstein's death in 1965. He redecorated it in notably spectacular fashion with the help of firm, McMillen. In 1980 he sold to Princess Ashraf of Iran, twin sister of the recently deposed Shah of Iran. In 1995 Henry Kravis bought the unit and has lived there since.

== Notable residents ==
- Leon Hess – Founder and President of Hess Corporation and one-time owner of the New York Jets.
- Sy Syms – Founder and owner of Syms, a clothing retailer, and benefactor of Syms School of Business.
- Helena Rubinstein – Businesswoman, art collector, and philanthropist
- Ira Rennert – Philanthropist, and former owner of Hummer
- Joseph V. McKee – Politician, New York City mayor for three months in 1932.
- David Simon – Son of Mel Simon, and current CEO of Simon Malls.
- Henry Kravis – Co-founder of Kohlberg Kravis Roberts & Co.
- Princess Ashraf of Iran – Twin sister of the deposed Shah.
- Hermann and Ursula Merkin – Philanthropists, benefactor of Yeshiva University and Merkin Concert Hall
- Charles Revson – Revlon Founder and owner, he acquired the famed triplex after rival Helena Rubinstein's death in 1965.

== See also ==
- 620 Park Avenue
- 655 Park Avenue
