= 655 Park Avenue =

Apartment building in Manhattan, New York

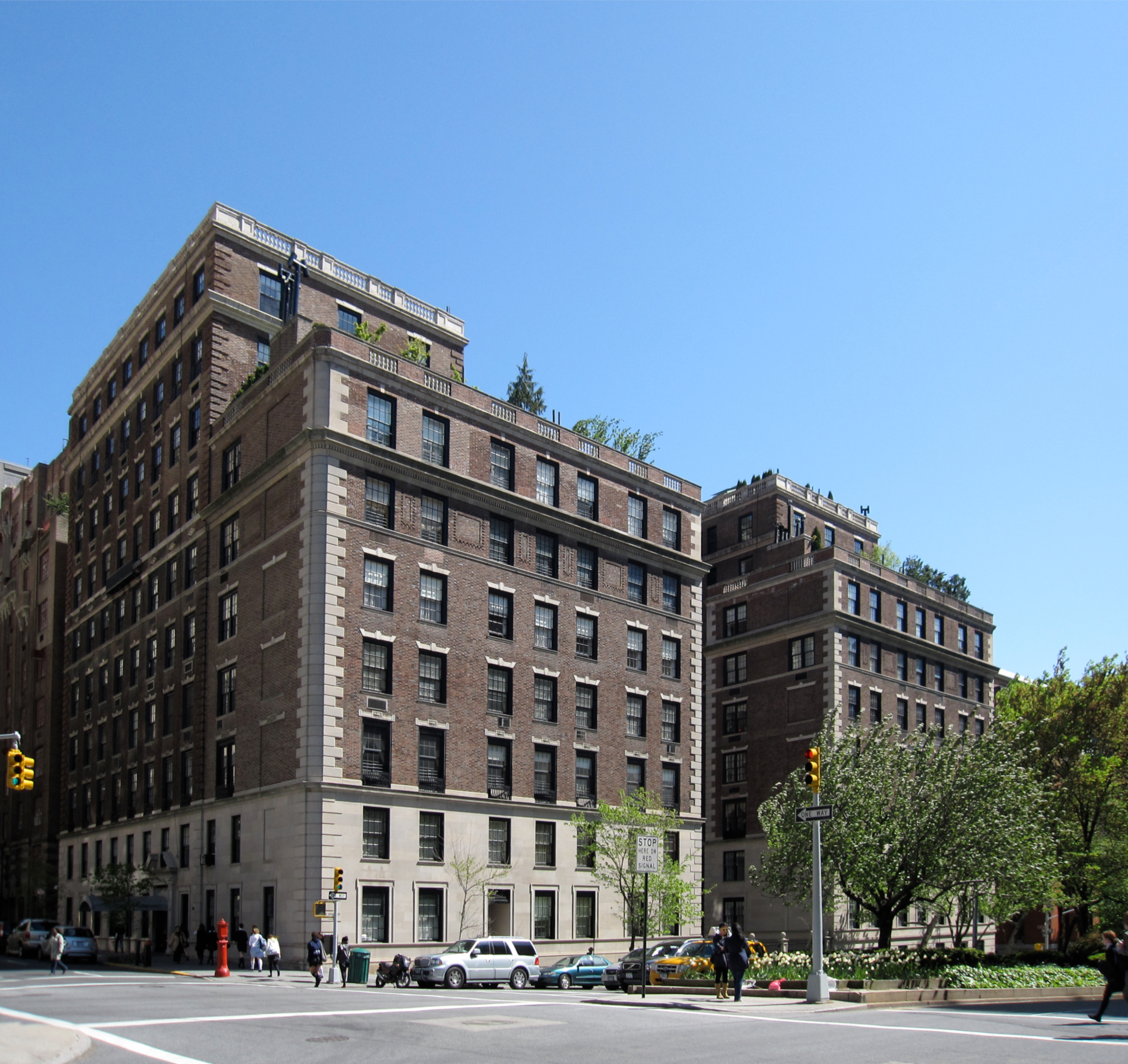
- Interactive map of the 655 Park Avenue area

General information
- Type: Housing cooperative
- Architectural style: Georgian Architecture
- Location: 655 Park Avenue, Manhattan, New York, U.S.
- Coordinates: 40.768243°N 73.965569°W
- Completed: 1924

Technical details
- Floor count: 11

Design and construction
- Architects: J.E.R. Carpenter, Mott B. Schmidt

655 Park Avenue is a Georgian-style co-op residential building on Manhattan's Upper East Side, located on Park Avenue between 67th Street and 68th Street, adjacent to the Park Avenue Armory. It was developed in 1924 by Dwight P. Robinson & Company. The building at 655 Park Avenue was designed by architects James Edwin Ruthven Carpenter, Jr., often referred to by the initials "J.E.R. Carpenter", and Mott B. Schmidt. Carpenter is considered the leading architect for luxury residential high-rise buildings in New York City in the early 1900s, while Schmidt is known for his buildings in the American Georgian Classical style, including Sutton Place and houses for New York City's society figures and business elite.

== Building ==
655 Park Avenue is designed in the Georgian architectural style, featuring a limestone base on the lower floors and brick masonry on the upper floors. The building is centered around a courtyard garden facing Park Avenue. Its staggered height design, which may be unique among Park Avenue co-ops of its time, resulted from restrictions imposed on the developer by a syndicate of owners of nearby mansions who sold the land for the building. This "Battle for Suitable Scale at 655 Avenue" is described in Andrew Alpern's book Historic Manhattan Apartment Houses. The 11-story main mid-block building includes an 8-story wing on 67th Street and a 7-story wing on 68th Street. It also features a duplex penthouse with a 3,000-square-foot roof terrace, as well as lower terraces on the 68th Street and 67th Street wings. The building has entrances on both 67th and 68th Streets and employs full-time doormen and elevator operators.

== Notable residents ==
- William Kissam Vanderbilt II, heir, motor racing enthusiast, and yachtsman
- Isaac Newton Phelps Stokes, architect and author of The Iconography of Manhattan Island
- Danielle Steel, author
- Charles Richard Crane, industrialist, heir, and noted Arabist
- Schuyler Chapin, art patron and general manager of the Metropolitan Opera
- William Coley, cancer researcher
- Barbara Goldsmith, author, journalist, and philanthropist
- Admiral Joseph J. ("Jocko") Clark, United States Navy

== See also ==
- 620 Park Avenue
- 625 Park Avenue
- 643 Park Avenue
- 720 Park Avenue
- 730 Park Avenue
- 740 Park Avenue
