= Sutton 58 =

Residential skyscraper in Manhattan, New York

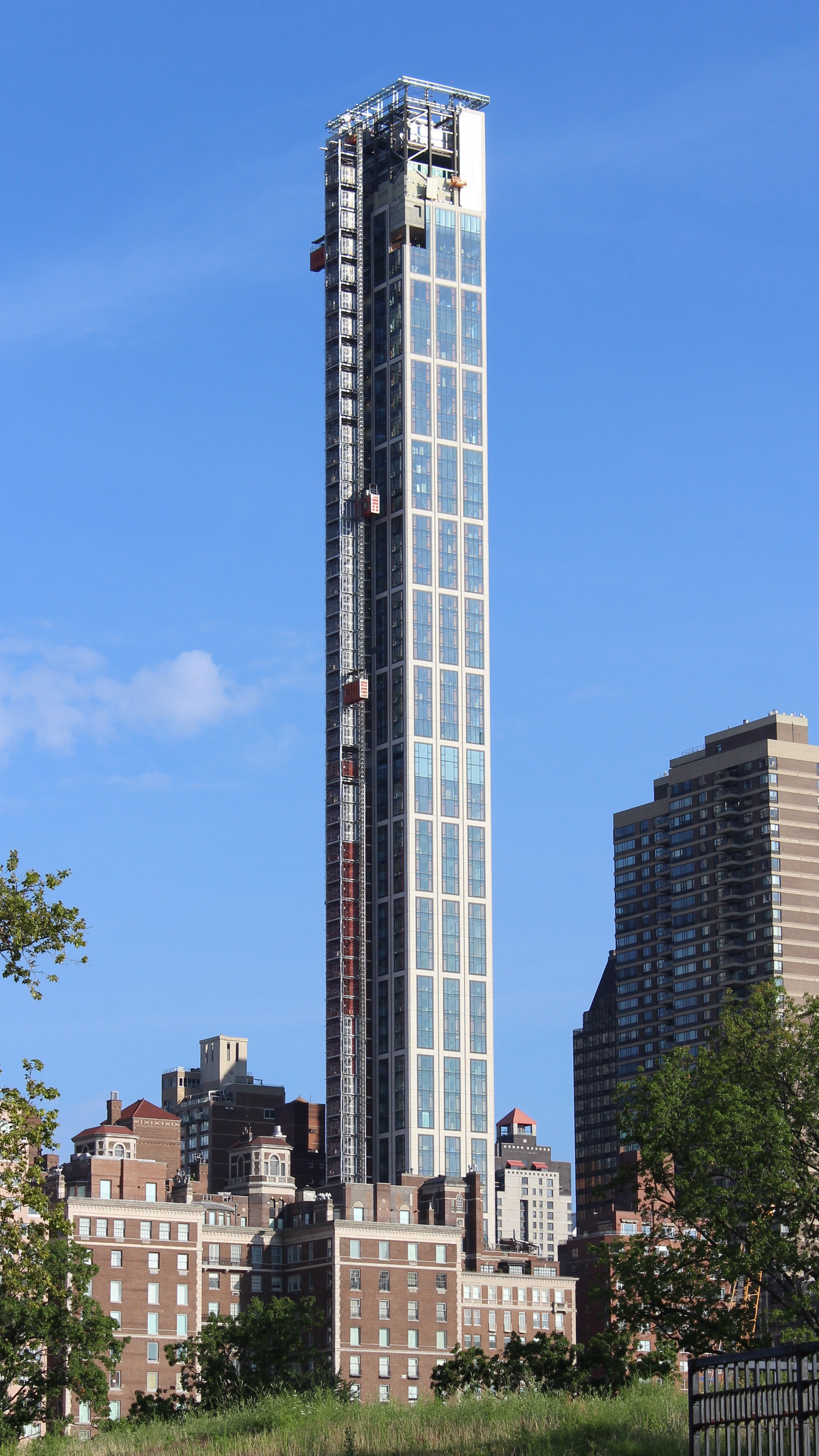

General information
- Status: Completed
- Type: Residential
- Location: 426–432 East 58th Street
- Coordinates: 40°45′30″N 73°57′41″W
- Construction started: 2017
- Completed: 2022

Height
- Height: 847 ft (258 m)

Technical details
- Floor count: 65

Design and construction
- Architect: Thomas Juul-Hansen
- Developer: Bauhause, Gamma Real Estate

Sutton 58 (also known as 3 Sutton Place) is a residential skyscraper in the Sutton Place neighborhood of Midtown East, Manhattan in New York City.

== Architecture ==
The building was designed by Thomas Juul-Hansen and is 847 feet (258 m) tall. It is variously cited as containing 62 stories or 65 stories. The site contains 260,000 square feet (24,000 m^{2}) of buildable space.

The tower's stone-and-glass facade contains five bays of windows on its northern and southern elevations and three bays on the western and eastern elevations. The tower is slightly cantilevered over a neighboring building to the east. The cantilever extends about 10 feet (3.0 m) over the neighboring structure at 434 East 58th Street. The superstructure is made of reinforced concrete. At the top of the building is a two-level, five-bedroom penthouse.

== History ==
=== Bauhouse plans ===
In January 2015, The Bauhouse Group secured three adjacent low-rise buildings on the east side of Midtown Manhattan in New York City. In March the firm acquired a fourth adjacent location, along with 100,000 square feet (9,300 m^{2}) of air rights, intending to construct a luxury residential skyscraper. That August, Bauhouse acquired another 109,000 square feet (10,100 m^{2}) of air rights for $37.9 million. The tower would have been designed by Foster and Partners and would have been about 1,000 feet (300 m) tall. Bauhouse obtained a $63 million loan from Gamma Real Estate in early 2015 and received another $147 million loan from Gamma that June. JLL brokered the loans.

The plans had generated opposition by mid-2015, and opponents raised money to fight the plans. As a direct response to the plans for 3 Sutton Place, community members and politicians sought to rezone the neighborhood, creating a height limit of 260 feet (79 m) for the area bounded by First Avenue to the west, 52nd Street to the south, and 59th Street to the east. At the time, the neighborhood had no height restrictions for new buildings, and developers needed only to assemble the required air rights. Residents of the neighboring 434 East 58th Street, whose air rights Bauhouse had purchased during late 2014 for $11 million, said they had been told the structure would be between 13 and 30 stories tall, only to then be shown the plans for a 90-story tower. According to a Bauhouse spokesperson, "As the complex assemblage continued into 2015, the size of the building increased." In the midst of opposition, Bauhouse executive Joseph Beninati sought a partner for the project, particularly one who could help underwrite the $650 million proposed cost. By December 2015, demolition permits had been filed for the site. A neighboring property owner, whose house abutted one of the buildings that was going to be demolished, claimed that the demolition would damage his house.

In January 2016, Bauhouse defaulted on the $147 million loan from Gamma. Early the next month, Gamma had started foreclosure proceedings on the site, and the Carlton Group sought an $80 million mezzanine loan for the project. Gamma scheduled a foreclosure auction for the site for February 29. Bauhouse asked a judge to enjoin Gamma from foreclosing on the site, but the request was denied on February 23. The following day, JLL sued Bauhouse and Beninati for failing to pay a broker's commission for the two loans the company had secured from Gamma. After failing to secure additional funding, Bauhouse filed for bankruptcy on the 3 Sutton Place site two days before the auction was set to occur, thus canceling the planned auction. Continuing litigation cast the future of the project into doubt. A bankruptcy court hearing took place in April 2016.

=== Gamma Real Estate takeover ===
An auction for the development site was approved in September 2016, and a December auction date was scheduled two months later. Gamma Real Estate acquired the site at auction, and it announced revised plans for the site. The plans called for a 67-story structure with 125 apartments across about 262,000 square feet (24,300 m^{2}). Concurrently, efforts to rezone the area proceeded. In April 2017, the initial rezoning proposal was released and was initially met critically. That same month Gamma Real Estate closed on the property. As part of the rezoning, buildings within the rezoned area were required to have 45 to 50 percent of their bulk below a height of 150 feet (46 m). Therefore, either the structure would have to be limited to 260 feet (79 m), or the proposed 800-foot (240 m) tower would need to have extremely narrow upper stories, which Gamma opposed.

The rezoning was approved in November, and after an initial decision to grant an exemption was reversed, construction work was halted by the end of the year. At the time, the foundation was nearly completed. Work resumed in June 2018 following approval from the Board of Standards and Appeals, although the project's opponents continued their efforts to halt construction. Construction rose above street level in June 2019 and facade installation began that December. In August 2020, the skyscraper topped-out and facade installation passed the halfway point. The last portions of cladding were installed in June 2021, and by August crown installation was progressing. The building was completed in 2022.
