= Joy Montgomery Higgins =

American suffragist, social worker

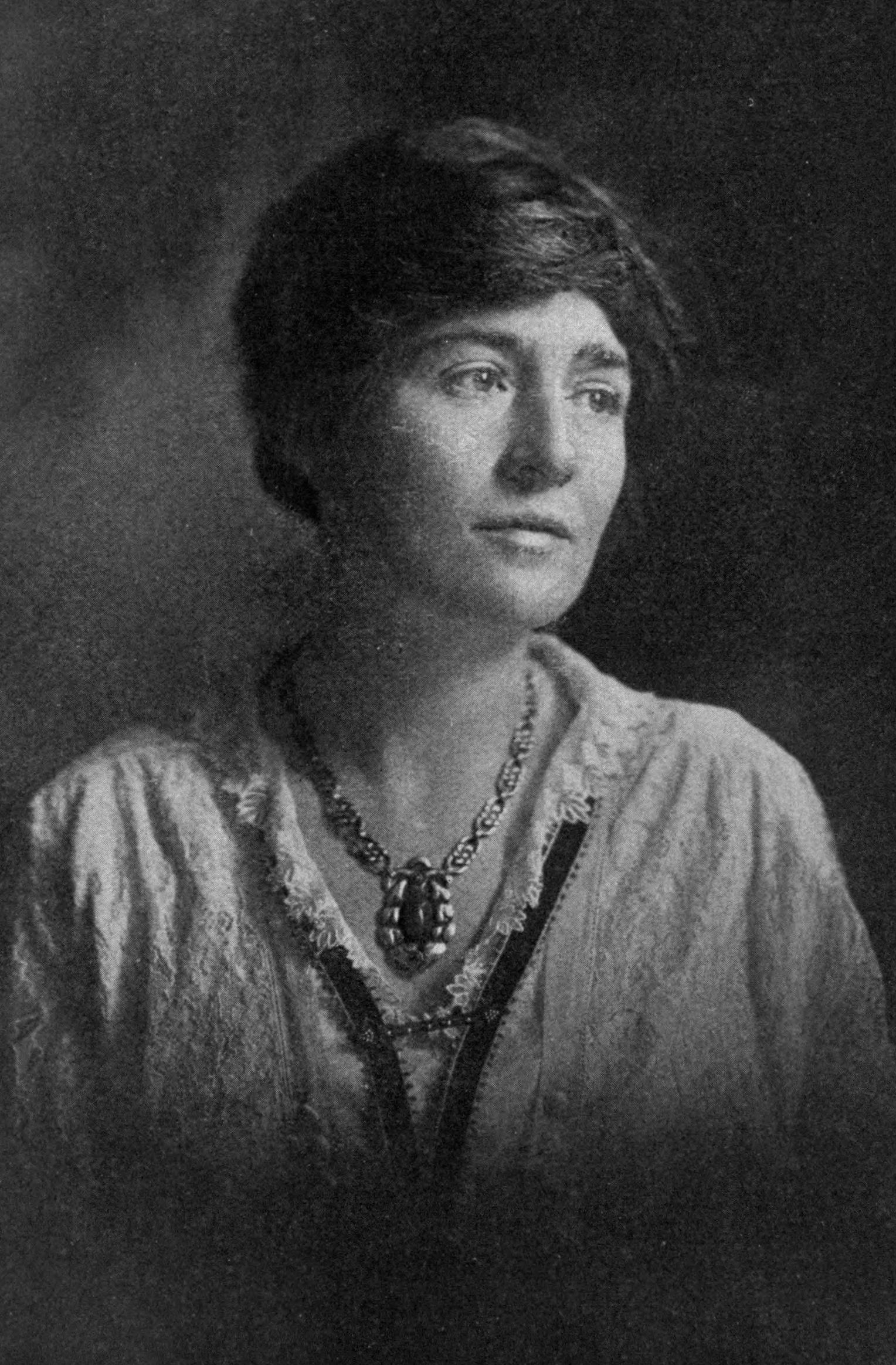
- Born: Joy Montgomery Higgins; December 13, 1874; Columbus, Nebraska, U.S.
- Died: January 3, 1959 (aged 84); New Orleans, Louisiana, U.S.
- Occupations: Suffragist, author
- Relatives: Andrew Higgins (brother)

Joy Montgomery Higgins (December 13, 1874 – January 3, 1959) was an American activist, social worker, and author who is known for her contributions to women's suffrage in the United States, among other causes.

== Family background and education ==
Joy Montgomery Higgins was born on December 13, 1874, in Columbus, Nebraska, the daughter of Judge John G. Higgins and Anna Long (O'Conor) Higgins. She had nine siblings, including businessman Andrew Higgins. Her father was a Chicago attorney and newspaper reporter who had relocated to Nebraska, where he served as a local judge.

== Career ==
During World War I, Higgins worked with Samuel Gompers and traveled to Europe to work with the Commission on International Labor Legislation, which would lead to the creation of the International Labour Organization.

Higgins was published in magazines and various national periodicals, including the New York Times. In 1915, her poem "The Puppet" was described as one of the most impactful war poems of the year.

In 1935, Higgins was one of the founders and incorporators of American National Theater and Academy, established with the intention of being the official United States national theatre that would be an alternative to the for-profit Broadway industry.

For several years, Higgins worked alongside her brother Andrew. In the 1940s, he tasked her with leading Higgins Industries' recreation and education program for his 25,000 employees and their family members. Higgins worked to build playgrounds, construct a childcare facility, and developed youth enrichment activities including athletics and classes in drama and music.

== Activism ==
Higgins was a notable activist for a variety of causes, including worker's rights, women's suffrage, labor rights, animal rights, and children's enrichment programs. Higgins was an active board member and worker in the Omaha Social Settlement, working to provide services such as daycare, English classes, and healthcare to immigrant families and individuals in poverty. Higgins was also an active Episcopalian and led the St. Barnabas Episcopal Church Girl's Friendly Society.

=== Women's suffrage ===
Higgins was an active advocate for the women's right to vote in the United States. She was a member of the Equal Franchise Society, and frequently traveled throughout the United States to deliver speeches on the topic of women's suffrage.

=== Wildlife ===
Higgins was an advocate for animal welfare and preservation of natural habitats. She founded the Nebraska Audubon Society in 1913 and was its secretary. She was also a trustee of the Nebraska Humane society and the Nebraska Ornithological Society.

== Death ==
Higgins died on January 3, 1959, at age 84 in New Orleans. She is buried in Greenwood Cemetery.

== Selected works ==
Gage was an active columnist and contributing author to numerous publications in the United States. These publications offered her the opportunity to publish poems and columns. She also wrote plays for the National Recreation Association. The following is a partial list.

- "The Little Toilers", poem published in The New York Times, 1915. p 18.
- "The Puppet", poem published in The New York Times, 1915.
- "Our Blighty Too", short story published in the New York Tribune, 1918.
- "A Pan-American Carnival", stage play, 1941.
