= Hermitage Hotel =

Historic hotel in Nashville, Tennessee

- U.S. National Register of Historic Places
- U.S. National Historic Landmark
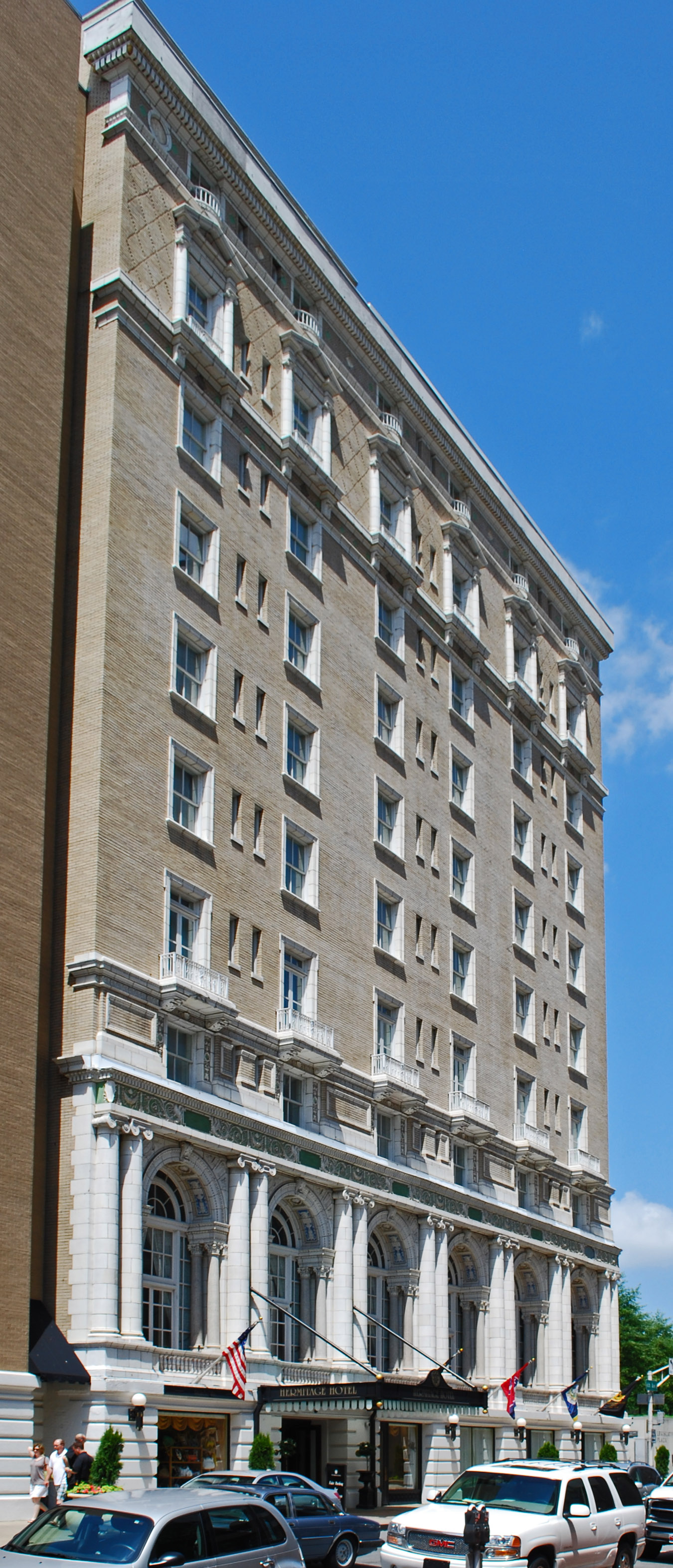

- Location within Tennessee Location within the United States
- Location: 231 6th Ave. N, Nashville, Tennessee
- Coordinates: 36°9′47″N 86°47′1″W
- Built: 1908
- Architect: Carpenter, J.Edwin
- Architectural style: Beaux Arts
- NRHP reference No.: 75001749, 100005652

Significant dates
- Added to NRHP: July 24, 1975
- Designated NHL: August 28, 2020

The Hermitage Hotel is a historic hotel located at 231 6th Avenue North in Nashville, Tennessee. Commissioned by 250 Nashville residents in 1908 and named for Andrew Jackson's estate, The Hermitage near Nashville, the hotel opened in 1910. It was built in the Beaux-Arts style and is the only remaining example of this style of architecture in a commercial building in Tennessee.

The Hermitage Hotel was designated a National Historic Landmark on August 28, 2020 for its important role in the final victory of the 19th Amendment dealing with voting rights for women. The hotel was listed on the National Register of Historic Places in 1975, primarily for architectural reasons. It is also a member of Historic Hotels of America, an official program of the National Trust for Historic Preservation.

== History ==
The Hermitage Hotel was constructed in the heart of downtown Nashville, two blocks from the Tennessee State Capitol, where Nashville's finest residential neighborhood evolved into a business district early in the 20th century. Commissioned by 250 locals in 1908, The Hotel Hermitage opened its doors on Saturday, September 17, 1910. It was Nashville's third "skyscraper" to be built downtown. In 1910, the new hotel advertised its rooms as "fireproof, noise proof, and dust proof, rooms $2.00 and up." The hotel opened with every possible modern convenience, including a telephone and circulating ice water in all guest rooms, and high standards of guest service.

The lobby itself was—and still is—the main focal point of the hotel, a spacious Beaux-Arts masterpiece graced with a profusion of ornamental plaster and a painted glass ceiling. From the street entrance, a grand staircase leads to the lobby with walls distinctively built of golden-hued Sienna Marble. The Main Dining Room (now the Grand Ballroom) was located off the lobby area and was richly detailed with Circassian walnut walls and an ornate ceiling, features that still exist today. A social room to the front of the hotel was elevated above lobby level and named the Loggia (now the Veranda). It was designed in an Italian Renaissance style, clad in ornamental white and polychrome terra cotta with arched openings and balconies overlooking the street. Downstairs, was the Grille Room (now named Drusie & Darr), which was originally designed as a rathskeller (also ratskeller) with vaulted ceilings and wood paneling.

Along the street entrance, an array of shops included a pharmacy and clothing store, later a familiar place for many Nashville natives as an American Airlines ticket office. The original hotel included an exhibit hall on the ninth (top) floor, salesmen "sample rooms" on the eighth floor, a cigar and newsstand in the lobby, and a barbershop on the Grille level.

As one of Nashville's leading hotels, it was a national platform for both pro- and anti-suffrage forces in 1920, when Tennessee became the 36th state to ratify the 19th Amendment to the United States Constitution giving women the right to vote. The hotel also had early musical roots and influences in Nashville with its hotel "big band", the Francis Craig Orchestra. Mr. Craig and his musicians were part of the first day's live radio broadcast of newly formed station WSM in October 1925, the same station that soon developed the Grand Ole Opry programming. Craig, on the eve of retirement in 1947, became a national musical celebrity when a song he had composed and recorded, "Near You", became America's top selling record. Released on an independent label, the song's success helped compel the major record companies to establish a stronger Nashville presence, cementing its status as a footnote in the evolution story of the newly emerging "Music City".

The Hermitage Hotel has a storied past, including presidential visits that began with a banquet for President Taft in 1911, followed by Governor Woodrow Wilson in 1912 and in more recent decades, John F. Kennedy, Lyndon Johnson, and Richard Nixon. State politics played a large role in the hotel's history, and it was often used as a campaign headquarters and an after-hours meeting place for legislators. Celebrities from Charlie Chaplin to Jack Dempsey to Amelia Earhart have enjoyed the hospitality offered at the Hermitage, which was known for its high levels of elegant service and dining in addition to its distinctive architecture.

The grand dame closed at the end of 1977 with its fate uncertain. During that era, the popularity of the inner city had declined, and the hotel's prosperity faltered. Local preservationists (now Historic Nashville, Inc.) and Mayor Richard Fulton were the driving forces behind saving the Hermitage as well as other landmarks in downtown Nashville, including Ryman Auditorium. The hotel changed ownership and underwent a complete renovation, reopening in 1981 as a Park Suite Hotel. Subsequently, the hotel changed hands several more times in the 1980s and 1990s. Legendary pool player Rudolf Wanderone, better known as "Minnesota Fats," lived in the hotel during part of this era. In June 2000, Historic Hotels of Nashville, LLC, purchased The Hermitage Hotel and completely renovated the guest rooms and public areas. A major refresh of all guest rooms and suites, public areas, restaurants and kitchen was carried out during 2021-2022, retaining the architectural features while bringing a new, lighter, and modern elegance with furnishings and decor.

Originally offering 250 guestrooms more than a century ago, the hotel now provides 122 rooms and five fixture bathrooms to the traveling public. In the 21st century the hotel has received many accolades, including the American Automobile Association (AAA) Five-Diamond rating in 2007. A Forbes 5-Star rating (then Mobil 5-Star) was awarded in 2008, and the accolades have perpetuated, including Best City Center Hotel award by Historic Hotels of America in 2020. In November 2021 the culinary operation of the restaurant was licensed to world renowned chef Jean-Georges Vongerichten.

== Ties to Nashville music industry ==
The Francis Craig Orchestra performed in the main dining room and Grille Room from 1925 to 1945. Craig's orchestra was also the first to broadcast over WSM and enjoyed success with a 12-year show that was aired over the entire NBC network. He introduced newcomer Dinah Shore. Numerous orchestra members who continued to successful careers included James Melton and Snooky Landsen.

In the late 1940s the office of the early Nashville Symphony Orchestra was located in the Hermitage Hotel. In the late 1950s, CMA was formed in meetings at the Hermitage Hotel during the annual Disc Jockeys convention. In the 1960s, famed songwriter Cindy Walker worked from a Hermitage hotel room and invited future greats such as Roy Orbison to hear songs she wrote and recommended. In more recent times music videos have been recorded in the hotel by Reba McEntire, Josh Turner, and others.

== See also ==
- List of Historic Hotels of America
- List of National Historic Landmarks in Tennessee
- National Register of Historic Places listings in Davidson County, Tennessee
