= Nicolai Abracheff =

Bulgarian-American painter and illustrator

Nicolai Abracheff, Bulgarian: Николай Абрашев
- Born: 08 22 1897; Sifia, Bulgaria (София, България)
- Died: 1978 (aged 80–81); New York
- Known for: Painting (still life, landscape)

Nicolai Abracheff (Bulgarian: Николай Абрашев; artistic alias in Brazil: Nicola de Garo), active 1920s–1960s, was a Bulgarian-born American painter and illustrator, active in New York during the interwar and postwar decades. He was known for floral still lifes, landscapes, and illustrations published in major cultural magazines. His career was documented in contemporary art directories, museum bulletins, and later scholarly references.

== Early life ==
Born 1897 in Sofia, Bulgaria, Abracheff studied fine arts in Sofia and participated in World War I (1914-1918) as an officer of the Bulgarian army. After the end of the war, he became the editor of the literary and art magazine Zemja (Земя). Abracheff travelled to Germany, Italy, France, Brazil and in 1926 arrived in the United States. He was influenced by Alfons Mucha and Manchini as well as by Picasso and Braque.

== Career ==
By the mid-1920s, Abracheff was active in the New York art scene. A 1927 issue of Town & Country magazine noted his participation in an exhibition of paintings in the city, placing him among the circle of émigré artists who contributed to the cultural life of Manhattan during that period. His name also appeared in the Forum and Column Review in 1928, and his illustrations were published in Harper’s Bazaar in 1929, reflecting his engagement with both cultural and fashion periodicals.

His work received institutional recognition: the Bulletin of the Pennsylvania Museum cited him in 1939, the Philadelphia Museum of Art Bulletin mentioned him in 1940, and the Philadelphia Museum Bulletin referenced his paintings in 1941, indicating that his art was circulating in museum contexts as well as private collections.

Abracheff was also listed in several professional directories, including the American Art Directory (1937), the Art School Directory (1939), and the American Art Annual (1939), all of which confirm his professional presence in the American art world. By the late 1950s, he was included in the standard reference work Who's Who in American Art, and in the Index to Art Periodicals compiled by the Ryerson Library of the Art Institute of Chicago, underscoring that his name continued to appear in professional art bibliographies into the 1960s.

== Artistic style ==
Abracheff’s paintings were primarily floral still lifes and landscapes, often executed in a decorative, modernist-inflected style. His illustrations for Harper’s Bazaar suggest an ability to adapt his aesthetic to applied and commercial contexts.

== Exhibitions and collections ==
Abracheff’s work was exhibited in New York during the 1920s and 1930s, as noted in contemporary press coverage. Institutional references in Philadelphia museum bulletins during 1939–1941 indicate that his work entered or was shown in museum contexts.

== Legacy ==
Although Abracheff’s career was primarily active in the United States during the 1920s–1950s, his name has continued to appear in later art-historical scholarship. The 2005 exhibition catalog Künstlerbrüder: von den Dürers zu den Duchamps, published by the Haus der Kunst in Munich and the Palais des Beaux-Arts in Brussels, included a reference to Abracheff, situating him within a broader comparative study of artists across Europe and America.
