= 620 Park Avenue =

Apartment building in Manhattan, New York

Coordinates: 40°46′01″N 73°58′02″W

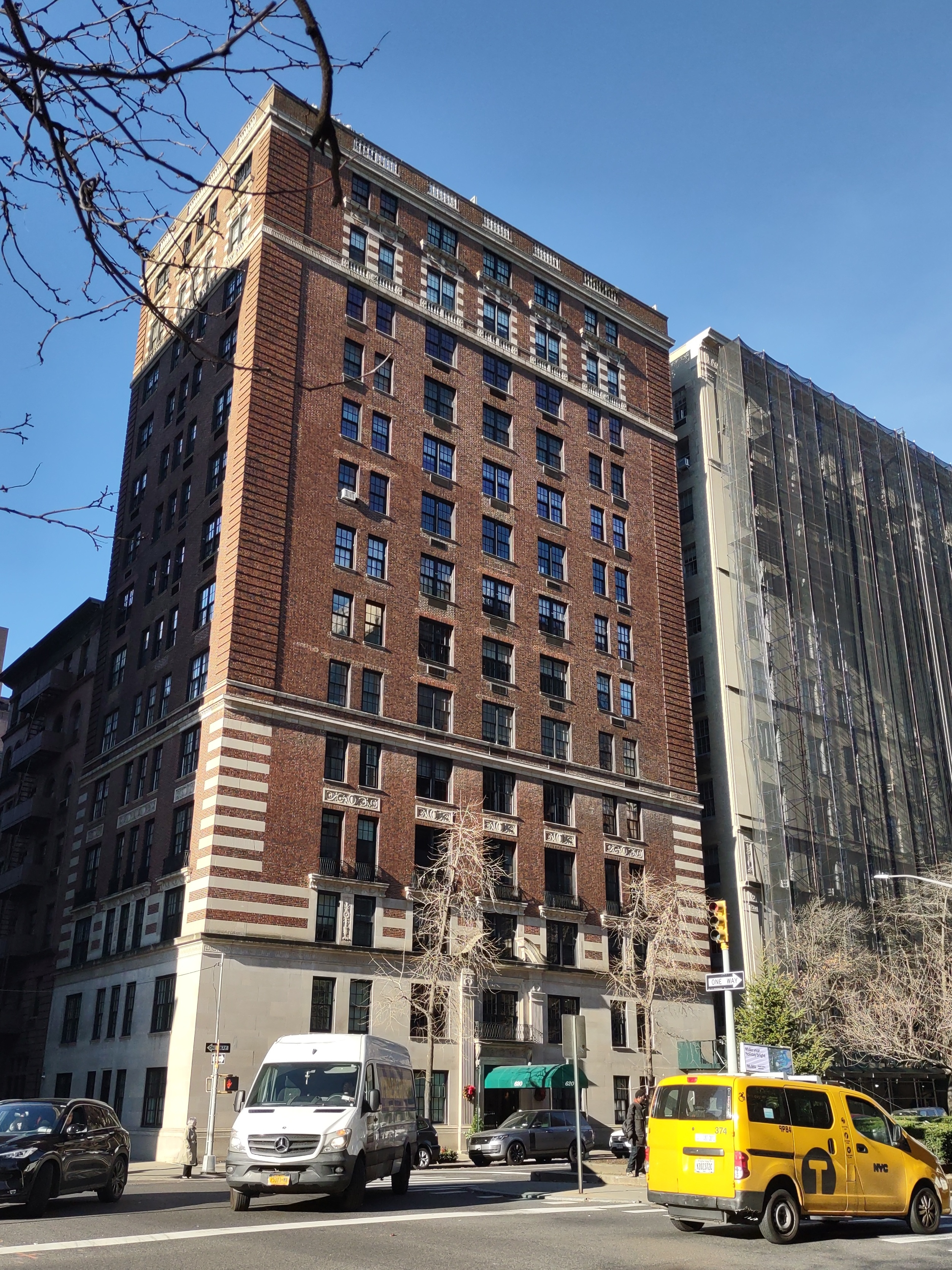
- Interactive map of the 620 Park Avenue area

General information
- Type: Housing cooperative
- Location: 620 Park Avenue, Manhattan, New York, U.S.
- Completed: 1924

Technical details
- Floor count: 14

Design and construction
- Architect: J.E.R. Carpenter

620 Park Avenue is a luxury apartment building on the Upper East Side of Manhattan on Park Avenue between East 65th and 66th Streets.

== History ==
620 Park Avenue was designed by J.E.R. Carpenter, who also designed 625 Park Avenue across the avenue; and constructed by Starrett Brothers construction in 1924. It features a limestone facade on the two lowest floors and a brick exterior for the upper 13 floors. It is a 15-story building featuring just 15 units each composed of a full floor. In recent years, it has become known for its conservative and often exclusionary co-op board and is known to avoid famous or notorious residents.

== Notable residents ==
- Dr. Paul Marks - former head of Sloan-Kettering

== In popular culture ==
In the 1999 American film Being John Malkovich, 620 Park Avenue is featured as the home of John Malkovich.
