= 960 Fifth Avenue =

Residential skyscraper in Manhattan, New York

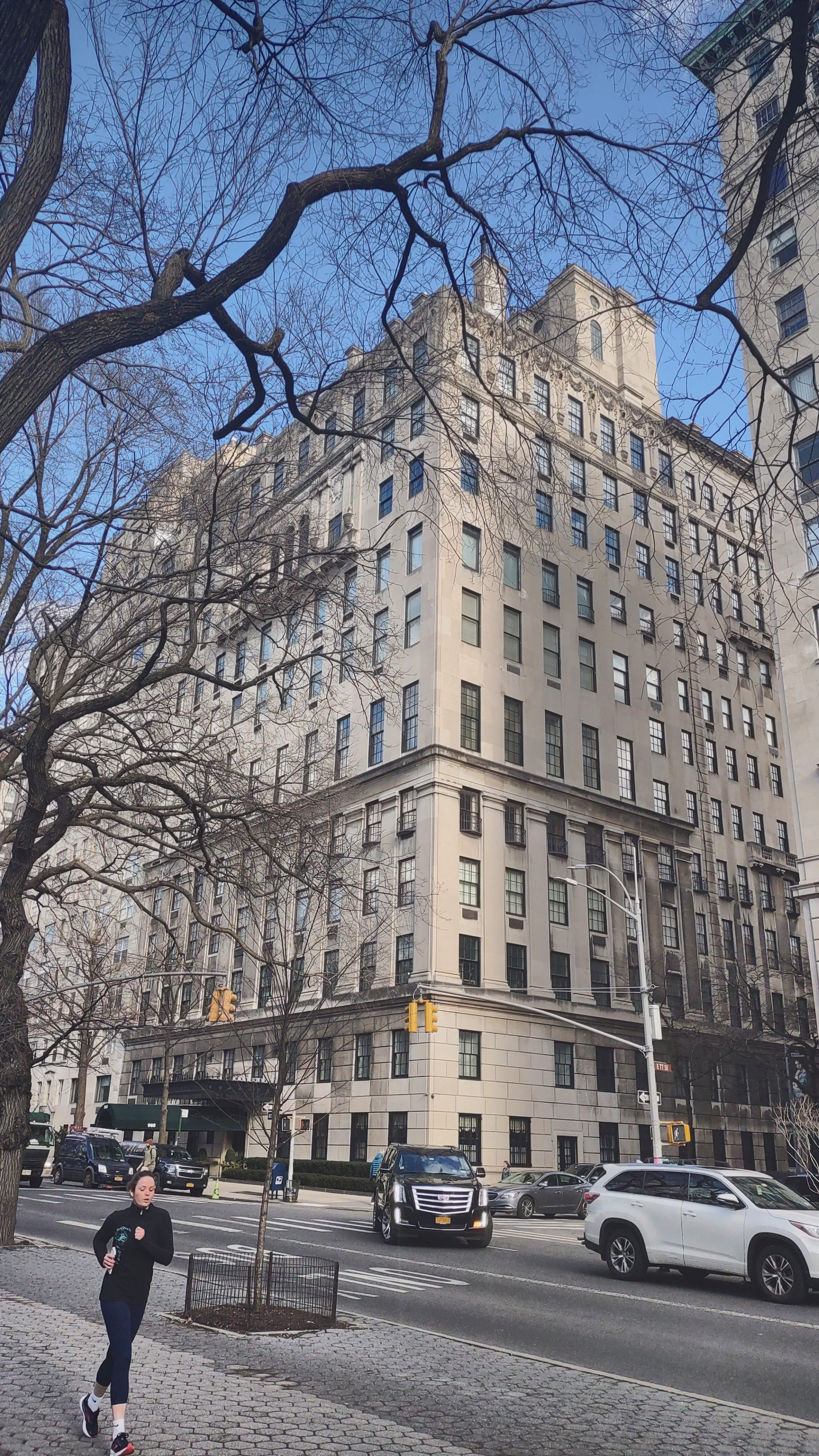

General information
- Status: Completed
- Type: Cooperative apartment building
- Location: 960 Fifth Avenue
- Coordinates: 40°46′33″N 73°57′52″W
- Construction started: 1927
- Opening: 1928

Technical details
- Floor count: 15

Design and construction
- Architects: Warren & Wetmore; Rosario Candela
- Developer: Anthony Campagna

Other information
- Number of suites: 19

960 Fifth Avenue, also known as 3 East 77th Street, is a luxury apartment building at the northeast corner of Fifth Avenue and East 77th Street in Manhattan, New York. Designed by Warren & Wetmore and Rosario Candela, the 15-story structure was completed in 1928.

== History ==
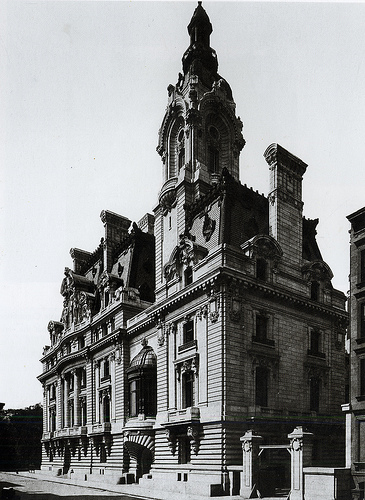
The William A. Clark House at 962 Fifth Avenue, which was torn down to build 960 Fifth Avenue

960 Fifth Avenue was built on the former site of the William A. Clark House. When Senator Clark died in 1925, his widow and daughter, Huguette Clark, moved to 907 Fifth Avenue and sold the mansion, which cost $7 million, to Anthony Campagna for $3 million (equivalent to $55,076,000 in 2025) in 1927. Campagana had the mansion torn down just 16 years after it was built in 1911.

The new building was designed by Warren & Wetmore, who were responsible for Grand Central Terminal and the supervisory architects was Rosario Candela of Cross & Cross. Candela was "a 1920's architect known for grand flowing apartment layouts" who had a habit of cloistering bedroom wings away from the grand entertaining rooms. Dorothy Draper, the prominent interior decorator, was used as a consultant on the project. Campagna used Douglas L. Elliman & Co. as his broker for the sale of the coop apartments.

The building was started in 1927 and completed in 1928. Apartments average 14 to 17 rooms, with 8 maids' rooms. The original apartments were priced from $130,000 to $325,000 and more than 75 percent of the apartments were sold before the frame of the building was enclosed. The largest initial stockholder in the building was Dr. Preston Pope Satterwhite who reportedly paid $450,000 for his 20-room apartment, which was considered the most expensive cooperative sale ever paid at the time. There are also 60 rental apartments, which are smaller than the typical apartments in the building and are accessed from 77th Street.

960 Fifth is one of the few apartment buildings in New York with its own in-house restaurant. By 2025, it was one of three apartment buildings on the Upper East Side with that amenity, the others being 1 East 66th Street and 825 Fifth Avenue. Known as the Georgian Suite, the restaurant was originally financed through an additional fee levied upon each resident. The building's managers began renting out the Georgian Suite for outside events in the 1980s.

=== Reputation ===
According to Hall Willkie, president of Brown Harris Stevens, the building, along with 820 Fifth Avenue and 834 Fifth Avenue, is one of the "three top buildings, in terms of size, quality of apartments, and price" on Fifth Avenue.

Dan Dorfman of The New York Sun referred to the building as "the pinnacle of New York luxury living" and stated that "some real estate experts consider it Manhattan's premier residential building."

=== Notable sales ===
In 2009, Murray H. Goodman listed his apartment at $32.5 million, but sold it to Benjamin Steinbruch two years later for $18.875 million.

In 2013, the 11 room apartment 10/11B was listed for sale by Charles Lazarus, founder of Toys "R" Us, at $24.5 million after an initial listing of $29 million in 2011. It was eventually sold in 2014 to Carlos Rodríguez-Pastor, a Peruvian businessman who is the chairman of Interbank, for $21 million. This unit came to be after the apartment once owned by Dr. Satterwhite was divided into two units.

In 2014, the 16-room PHB apartment of Edgar Bronfman, Sr., former chairman of the Seagram Company who lived there for 40 years until his death in 2013, was listed for sale at $65 million. it was bought by Nassef Sawiris, the chief executive of Orascom Construction Industries and richest man in Egypt, for a reported $70 million, the then most expensive co-op in New York. It was the second most expensive coop sale in Manhattan in 2014 following the $71.3 million sale of a corner duplex at 740 Park Avenue to Israel Englander.

In 2017, the apartment of art dealer Robert H. Ellsworth and his partner Masahiro Hashiguchi, which encompassed the entire third floor, was sold to Carlos Alejandro Pérez Dávila, a Colombian financier (cousin of Alejandro Santo Domingo) whose family once controlled SABMiller, for $55 million. It was the most expensive coop sale in New York in 2017. The apartment was first owned by James H. Snowden in 1928 and was a duplex along with the northern section of the fourth floor.

== Notable residents ==
Past and present notable residents of the building included or include:

- Edgar Bronfman, Sr.
- Sister Parish
- Anne Bass
- Robert H. Ellsworth and Masahiro Hashiguchi
- Claus von Bülow
- Murray H. Goodman
- Louis Untermeyer
- C. Douglas Dillon
- Nassef Sawiris and Sherine Magar
- Charles Lazarus and Joan Regenbogen
- John Sullivan Jr. and Nonie Sullivan
- David Mackie
- Sharmin and Bijan Mossavar-Rahmani
- Emilia and José "Pepe" Fanjul
- Winthrop W. Aldrich
- Mathew and Ann Wolf
- Benjamin Steinbruch
- Gail Auchincloss Gilbert (wife of S. Parker Gilbert) and her son, S. Parker Gilbert, Jr.
- James Krugman and Connie Simmons
- James Coleman Jr.
- James and Marie Marlas
- Henri and Marsha Wedell
- William and Sherry Cherry
- Peter and Laura Grauer
- Mary Lawrence Porter
- Joseph and Mary Jane Platt
- James and Stephania McClennen
- Carlos Rodríguez-Pastor
- Andrew Atterbury and Gwyn Prentice
- Coleman and Susan Burke
- Elizabeth Ballantine and Paul Leavitt
- Gustavo and Patty Cisneros
