= 1040 Fifth Avenue =

Residential housing cooperative in Manhattan, New York

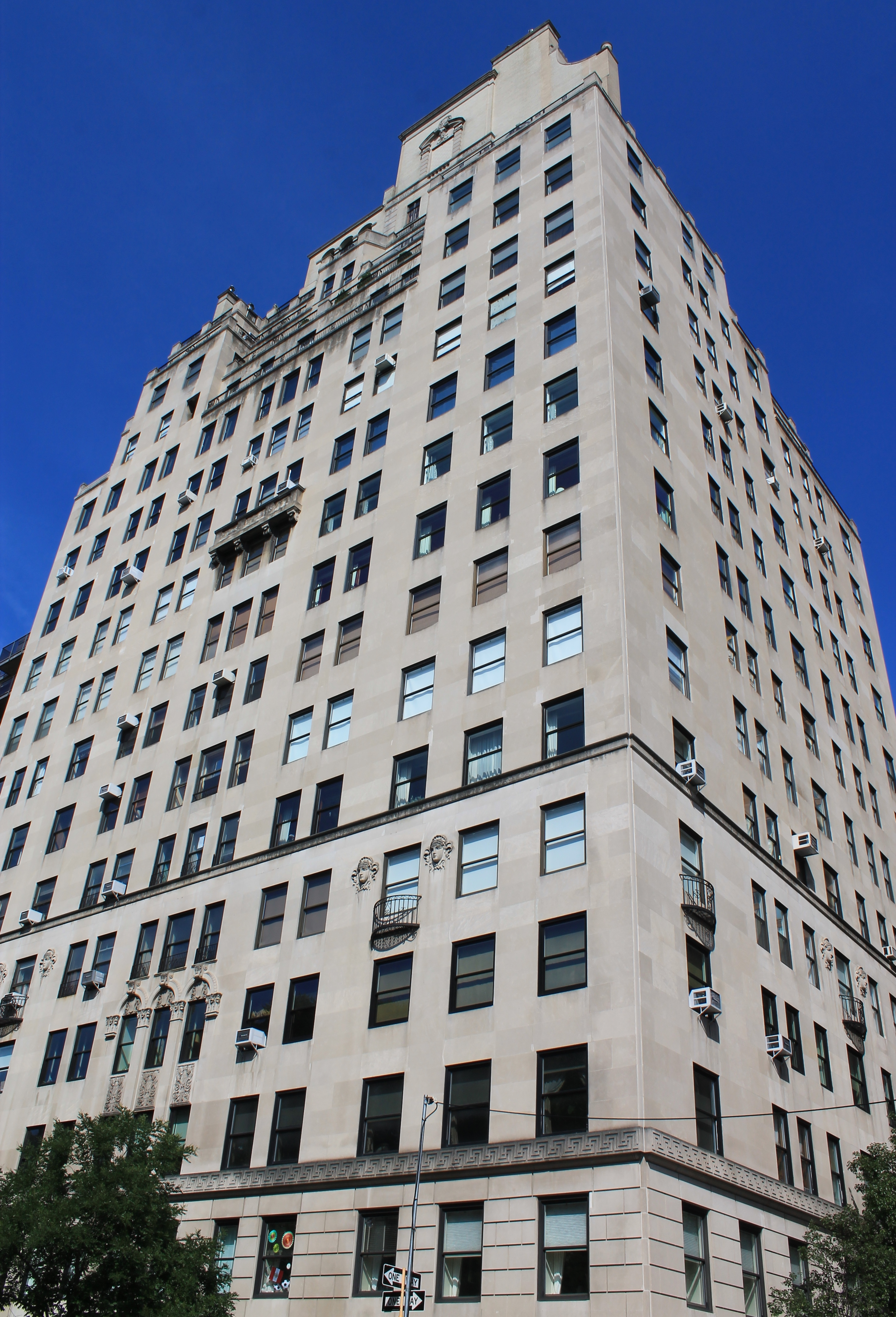
- Interactive map of the 1040 Fifth Avenue area
- Alternative names: 10 40

General information
- Type: Housing cooperative
- Location: 1040 Fifth Avenue, New York, NY, US
- Coordinates: 40.781061°N 73.960712°W
- Completed: 1930

Technical details
- Floor count: 17

Design and construction
- Architect: Rosario Candela

1040 Fifth Avenue (informally known as the 10 40) is a luxury residential housing cooperative on the Upper East Side of Manhattan in New York City.

== Overview ==
1040 is one of the tallest of the limestone-clad apartment houses on Fifth Avenue. The prominent 18-story structure has one of the most distinctive rooflines along the avenue. The canopied entrance has very attractive cast-iron doors and extensive sidewalk landscaping.

The facade, which has had many repairs, is relatively plain except for several sculpted faces at the fifth story. The large building has only 27 apartments and has had many prominent residents including Jacqueline Kennedy Onassis, who purchased a penthouse apartment on the 15th floor in 1964 and lived there for thirty years until her death in 1994.

The building was erected in 1930 and was designed by Rosario Candela, one of the city's most prominent designers of luxury apartment buildings in the late 1920s and early 1930s. Along with 1020 Fifth Avenue and 998 Fifth Avenue, it is considered among the most luxurious and prestigious co-operative buildings on the Upper East Side.

The asymmetrical roof, which is set back and clad in a pale yellow brick, has several tall arches whose openings were filled nicely with huge windows in the late 1990s in a remodeling of the spectacular penthouse. The rooftop design is somewhat similar to the roof at Ten Gracie Square, which was erected in the same year and designed by Van Wart & Wein with Pennington & Lewis.

== Residents ==
In addition to Jackie Kennedy Onassis, Generoso Pope lived in the apartment building. In 2000 actress Candice Bergen moved into her husband Marshall Rose’s apartment on the 16th floor. Julia Koch and David Koch lived in the building before moving to 740 Park Avenue in 2004.

== Critical reception ==
Architecture critic Paul Goldberger describes 1040 Fifth Avenue as being one of "the great apartment houses of the 1920s."
