= Shreve, Lamb & Harmon =

American architectural firm

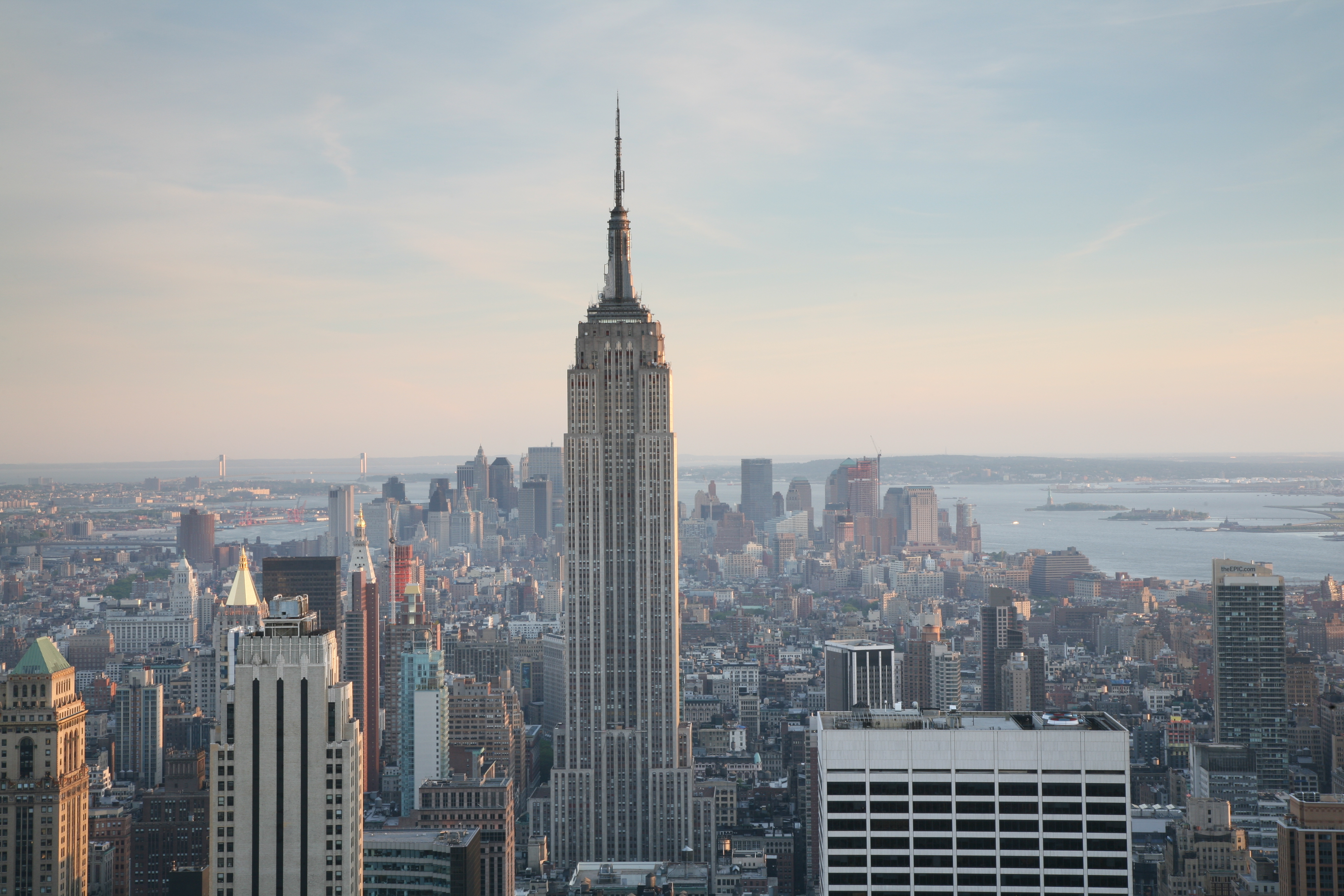
The Empire State Building, Shreve, Lamb, and Harmon's best known work

Shreve, Lamb, and Harmon, founded as Shreve & Lamb, was an architectural firm best known for designing the Empire State Building, the tallest building in the world at the time of its completion in 1931. The firm was prominent in the proliferation of Art Deco architecture in New York City.

== History ==
The firm was founded in 1920 as Shreve & Lamb, a partnership of Richmond Harold ("R.H.") Shreve, a Canadian from Nova Scotia, and William F. Lamb, from Brooklyn, New York. Shreve was the administrator, while Lamb was the architect. The two met while working at Carrère & Hastings, and Shreve & Lamb was initially a Carrère & Hastings firm. In 1924 the pair decided to leave Carrère & Hastings and became an autonomous architectural company.

In 1929, Arthur Loomis Harmon, from Chicago, Illinois, joined Shreve & Lamb, and the firm became Shreve, Lamb & Harmon. Prior to joining the firm, Harmon's works included battle monuments at Tours, Cantigny and Somme-Py in France, a YMCA in Jerusalem, and the Shelton Hotel in New York, U.S.

For the construction of the Empire State Building, the firm's most notable work and a symbol of the American expression of the Art Deco style, Lamb was responsible for the design, while Shreve's planning skills facilitated the completion of the construction in a year. Shreve's planning skills were recognized in New York, and he was involved in projects beyond the firm, such as the Slum Clearance Committee of New York.

Shreve, Lamb & Harmon's primary focus was commercial office buildings, and their work in this area was described as "spare and functional" in 2010 by the Landmarks Preservation Commission. However, the firm completed numerous residential projects, such as No. 130 East 57th Street, and this facet of the company's work was mainly conducted in neo-Tudor, as well as other popular historical styles of the 1920s.

Shreve, Lamb and Harmon had also employed the future architect behind the original World Trade Center complex, Minoru Yamasaki, after he had completed a masters degree in architecture in 1936. Lasting until 1945, this professional relationship was cut short when Yamasaki took a job at Smith, Hinchman & Grylls.

It is not entirely clear when the company went out of business, with 1989 being a likely date.

The archives of Shreve, Lamb & Harmon are kept at the Avery Architectural and Fine Arts Library of Columbia University.

== Notable buildings ==
All buildings are located in New York City unless otherwise indicated:

- Reynolds Building, Winston-Salem, 1929
- 521 Fifth Avenue (also known as the Lefcourt National Building), 1929
- 40 Wall Street (as consulting architect; with H. Craig Severance and Yasuo Matsui), 1930
- 740 Park Avenue (with Rosario Candela), 1930
- 3 East 57th Street, 1930
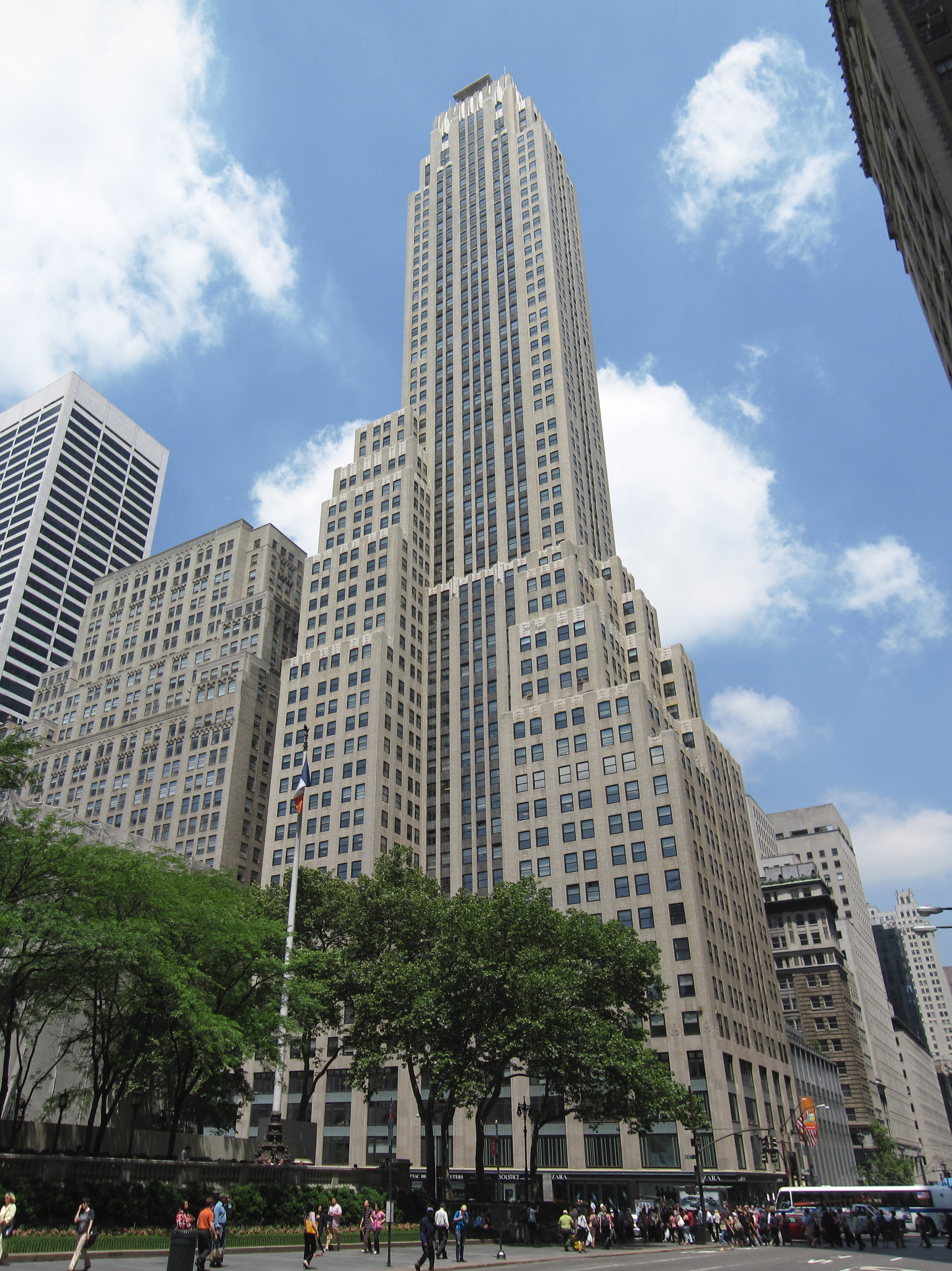
- 500 Fifth Avenue (1931)
  500 Fifth Avenue, 1931
- Empire State Building, 1930–1931
- 14 Wall Street (formerly the Bankers Trust Company Building) addition, 1931–1932
- 99 John Street (also known as '99 John Deco Lofts'), 1932
- Joel W. Solomon Federal Building and United States Courthouse (1932)
  Joel W. Solomon Federal Building and United States Courthouse (with R. H. Hunt), Chattanooga, Tennessee, 1932
- 99 John Deco Lofts (formerly The Great American Insurance Company Building), 1933
- Jerusalem International YMCA (architect Arthur Loomis Harmon), Jerusalem, Israel, 1933
- Acacia Building, Washington, D.C., 1936
- Hill Building (formerly the SunTrust Tower, CCB Building or Central Carolina Bank, and Durham Bank and Trust Building), Durham, North Carolina, 1935–1937
- 100 Ardsley Avenue West (Hudson House), Irvington, NY 1936
- Lever Brothers Co. Headquarters (now MIT Sloan School, Building E52), Cambridge, Massachusetts, 1938
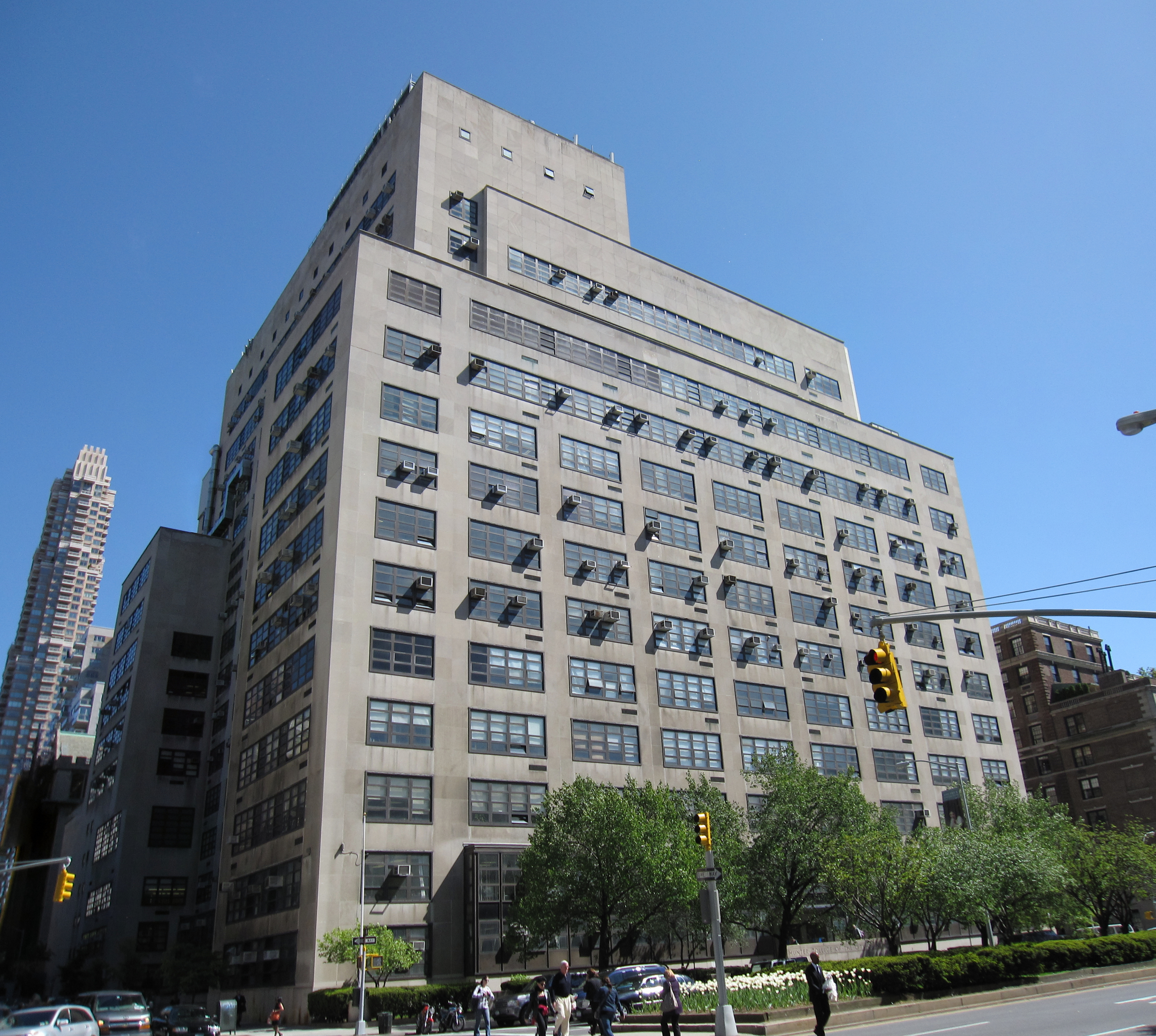
- North Building, Hunter College
  Hunter College, 1940
- Parkchester buildings, 1939–1942
- Best & Company Building (demolished), 1947
- 1740 Broadway (formerly the MONY Building or Mutual of New York Building), 1950
- New York Supreme Court, Kings County, 1957
- Carman Hall, 1960
- United Engineering Center (demolished in 1998), 1961
- 280 Park Avenue (formerly the Bankers Trust Building, with Emery Roth & Sons), 1961
- 222 Broadway (formerly the Western Electric Building), 1961
- Calyon Building (formerly the Crédit Lyonnais Building and J. C. Penney Building), 1964
- Uniroyal Giant Tire, Allen Park, Michigan, 1964
- 245 Park Avenue (formerly the Bear Stearns Building, American Brands Building, and American Tobacco Company Building), 1967
- 1250 Broadway (formerly the Cooper-Bregstein Building), 1967–1968
- Stonehenge, North Bergen, New Jersey, 1968
- 475 Park Avenue South, 1969
- Gouverneur Hospital, 1970
- Textron Tower (formerly the 40 Westminster Building and Old Stone Tower), Providence, Rhode Island, 1972
- 55 Church Street, New Haven, Connecticut, 1974
- Deutsche Bank Building (formerly the Bankers Trust Plaza, now demolished), 1974
- 3 Park Avenue, 1975
