= 740 Park: The Story of the World's Richest Apartment Building =

2005 book by Michael Gross

- Hardcover edition
- Author: Michael Gross
- Language: English
- Subject: 740 Park Avenue
- Genre: Non-fiction
- Set in: New York City
- Publisher: Broadway Books
- Publication date: October 18, 2005
- Publication place: United States
- Media type: Print, e-book
- Pages: 576
- ISBN: 978-0385512091 (hardcover edition)

740 Park: The Story of the World's Richest Apartment Building is a non-fiction book by American writer Michael Gross. The book was initially published on October 18, 2005 by Broadway Books. The book concentrates on the 19-floor, Art Deco luxury cooperative 740 Park Avenue designed by Rosario Candela and Arthur Loomis Harmon in 1929 and on several generations of the superrich who have lived there since its construction on the peak of the Great Depression.

== Reception ==
Teri Karush Roger of The New York Times stated "The book, which took Mr. Gross a year and a half to research and write, is meant to "trace the broad strokes of who is making the most money in the country at any point in the last 100 years," he said, "and who is using it in essence to show off, which is ultimately what apartments at 740 have become". Lisa Kassenaar of The Washington Post wrote "Gross, a society reporter, sneaks the reader past the doorman. Inside, we find architect Rosario Candela's vast ballrooms, winding marble staircases and gold doorknobs. We meet past and present residents including John D. Rockefeller Jr., Canadian liquor magnate Edgar M. Bronfman and former Reliance Group Holdings Inc. chairman Saul Steinberg". Neil Midgley of The Daily Telegraph added "Gross, it's fair to say, holds some billionaires in pretty low esteem".

== Film adaptation ==
The book inspired Park Avenue: Money, Power and the American Dream, the documentary directed by Alex Gibney, exploring the theme of income inequality in the United States. The film was produced for the Why Poverty? documentary project aired on public television networks around the world in fall 2012. The documentary compares the access to opportunities of residents of Park Avenue both on the Upper East Side and in the South Bronx.

== See also ==
- The New York Apartment Houses of Rosario Candela and James Carpenter
