= 1020 Fifth Avenue =

Residential building in Manhattan, New York

Coordinates: 40°46′46.8″N 73°57′41.3″W

- Alternative names: 1020 5th

General information
- Type: Housing cooperative
- Architectural style: Renaissance Revival
- Location: 1020 Fifth Avenue on 83rd Street, 1020 Fifth Avenue, New York, NY, 10028, New York City, United States
- Completed: 1925
- Owner: 1020 Fifth Avenue Corporation

Technical details
- Floor count: 13

Design and construction
- Architecture firm: Warren & Wetmore

1020 Fifth Avenue is a luxury housing cooperative on the Upper East Side of Manhattan, New York City. It is located on the northeast corner of 83rd Street and Fifth Avenue, across the street from the Metropolitan Museum of Art's Fifth Avenue building. It is part of the Metropolitan Museum Historic District. Along with 1040 Fifth Avenue and 998 Fifth Avenue, it is considered among the most prestigious residential buildings in New York City and is frequently included in lists of top residential buildings. Sales of units in the building are often reported by the press. Former New York Times architectural critic Carter Horsley describes the building as "[o]ne of the supreme residential buildings of New York". The building is profiled in multiple architectural books, including in Windows on the Park: New York's most prestigious properties on Central Park, where it is described as "one of the city's most exclusive addresses".

1020 Fifth Avenue was completed in 1925 and was designed by Warren and Wetmore. The building has 13 stories, consisting mostly of full floor units or duplexes. The building occupies a corner site that was once the site of the mansion of Civil War general Richard Arnold. The building's exterior has neo-Italian Renaissance style ornamentation with a three-story high rusticated base. The main entrance to the building faces East 83rd Street rather than Fifth Avenue. An entrance on Fifth Avenue provides access to a maisonette unit, which has its own address of 1022 Fifth Avenue. The building's floors are designed in a staggered manner as to allow six of the apartments to have large salons that are 20' 9" by 40' 2" in floor area with extra high ceilings ranging from fourteen to eighteen feet (see layout diagram).

== Notable residents ==
Notable current and former residents at 1020 Fifth Avenue have included socialite Georgette Mosbacher, Russian Nobility, business tycoon Ward Melville, hedge fund manager and Council on Foreign Relations board member Stephen Cyrus Freidheim, hotel developer Richard Born, and business tycoon Samuel Henry Kress and American socialite Frances Ellen Work who was the great-great-grandmother of British princes William and Harry along with American actor Oliver Platt.

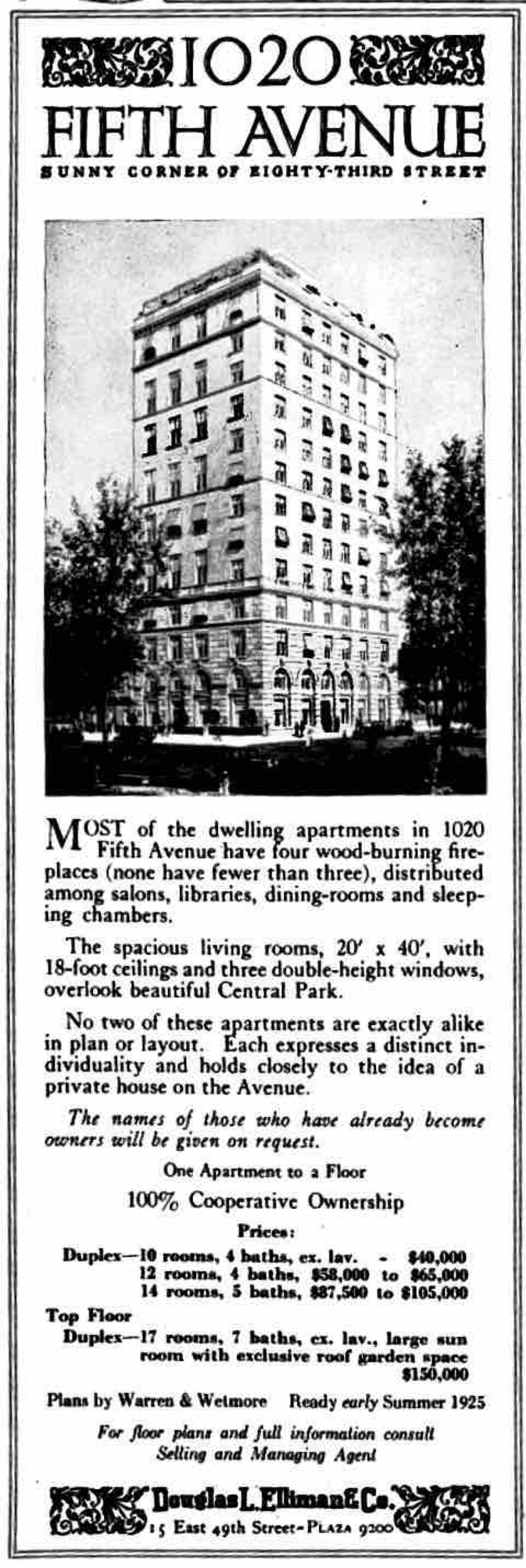
1925 Advertisement for 1020 Fifth Avenue

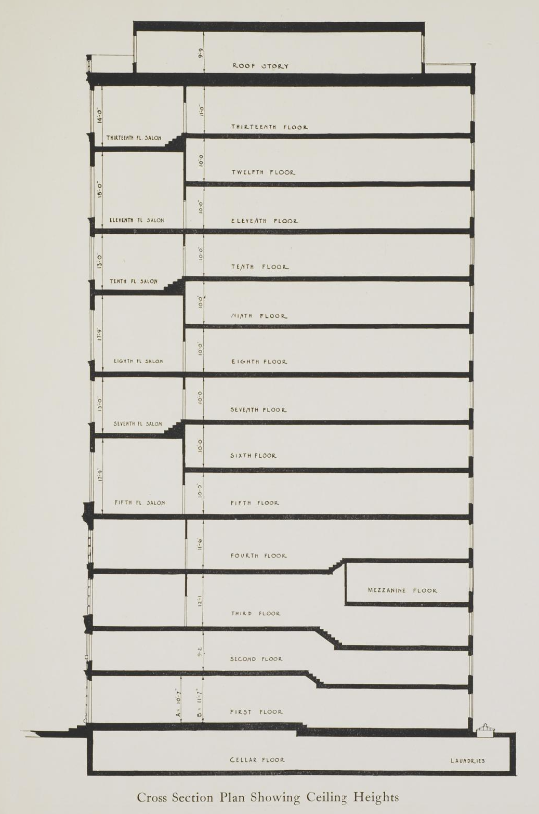
Architectural diagram showing layout of floors at 1020 Fifth Avenue.
