= 998 Fifth Avenue =

Residential building in Manhattan, New York

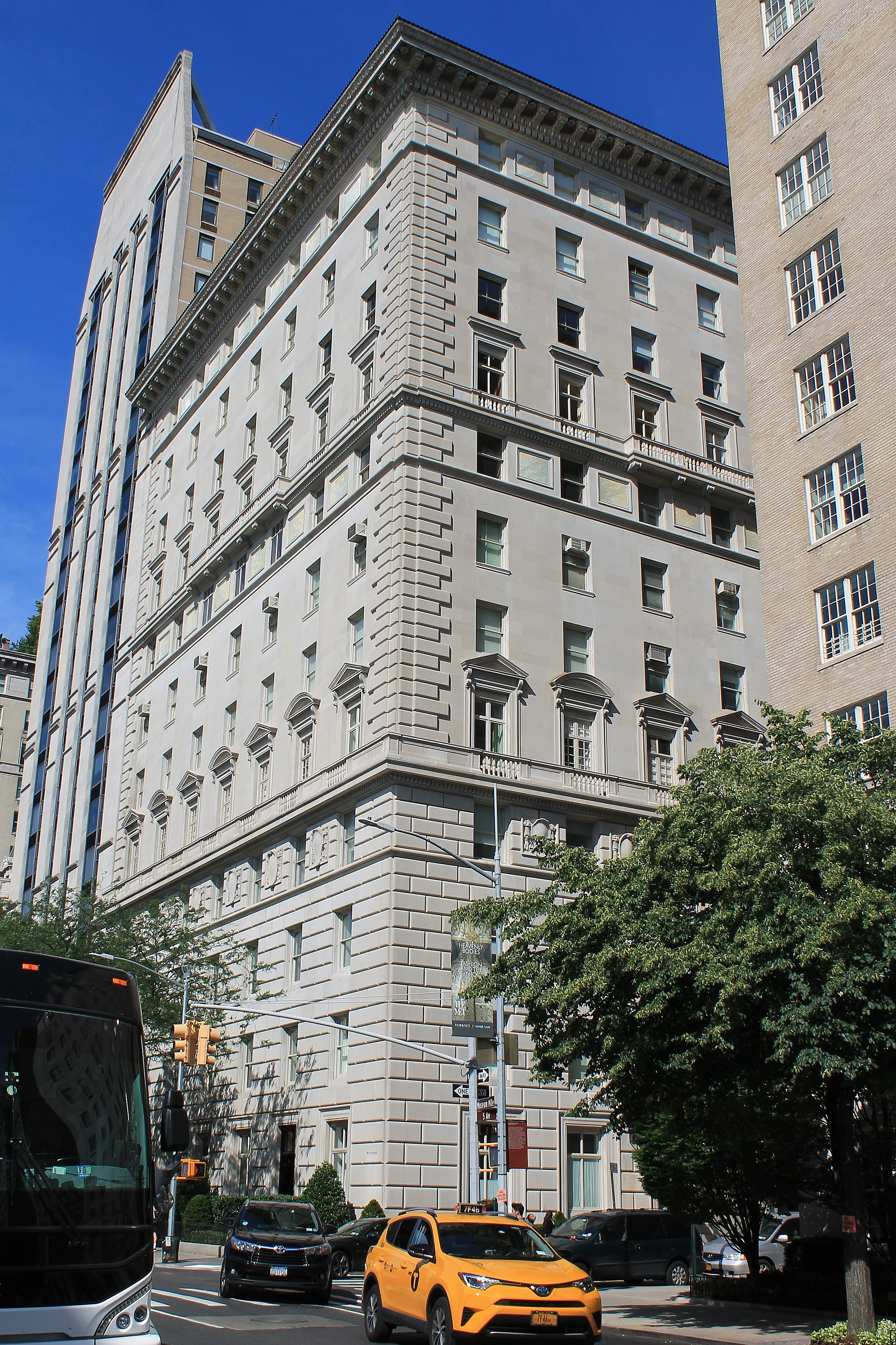
- Interactive map of the 998 Fifth Avenue area

General information
- Type: Residential
- Architectural style: Italian Renaissance
- Location: Upper East Side, Manhattan, New York City, U.S.
- Coordinates: 40.7783°N 73.9622°W
- Construction started: 1910
- Completed: 1912

Height
- Architectural: 167 feet (51 m)
- Tip: 170 feet (52 m)

Technical details
- Floor count: 12

Design and construction
- Architecture firm: McKim, Mead & White

New York City Landmark
- Designated: February 19, 1974
- Reference no.: 0429

998 Fifth Avenue is a luxury housing cooperative located on Fifth Avenue at the northeast corner of East 81st Street on the Upper East Side in Manhattan, New York City.

== Design ==
998 Fifth Avenue is a 150-foot-tall (46 m), 12-story building designed by the architectural firm McKim, Mead & White and built by James T. Lee between 1910 and 1912. It has a frontage of 102 feet 2 inches (31.14 m) on Fifth Avenue and 115 feet (35 m) on the side street. The Italian Renaissance Palazzo-style structure is sheathed entirely in limestone except for a large matching terra cotta cornice and an inner court that is 32.5 feet (9.9 m) square and faced with off-white brick. Unlike at nearby buildings, there are no penthouses.

Balustrade stringcourses define the division of the base from the body and the body from the top. Each window above the stringcourse is capped with a pediment or cornice. Panels of escutcheons and light-yellow marble decorate the structure horizontally at four-floor intervals.

The lobby walls, ceiling, and hallway walls, are made of tan Bottocino marble. The elevators have bronze grilles. Originally, the apartment interiors were decorated with neoclassical and Tudor-Jacobean Revival motifs.

=== Apartments ===
The original design included 18 apartments. The building contained 17 units upon opening, as some of the upper floors were combined into larger units. Floors 5 and 9 have ceiling heights of 11.5 feet, while the remaining floors have 10.5 feet ceilings. The ground floor has approximately 13 foot ceilings. The simplex maisonette on street level is 5,250 square feet (488 m^{2}), with the duplex maisonette on the side street being exactly the same size. Floors 2-8 contain 7 simplexes, each 6,250 square feet (581 m^{2}) with 15 rooms; these apartments contain 4 bedrooms, including a large corner master. On the side street floors, 3-8 contain 3 duplex units, each 5,000 square feet (460 m^{2}). The upper 4 floors originally contained 5 apartments. The 9th and 10th floors each contain a single apartment roughly 8,750 square feet (813 m^{2}), with 2 more simplexes and a duplex on the last 2 floors. There are 2 main elevators for the tenants and 1 service elevator for the staff; also a service stair.

== History ==
The building was the first super-luxury apartment house on Fifth Avenue. The architect was given unlimited permission to create whatever was necessary to lure the very wealthy into the building. At the time of its construction, the upper class lived in mansions and townhouses on the Upper East Side. Grand apartments had been built before, but those were occupied by businessmen and the nouveau riche, not the upper crust of American society. During its construction, it was viewed as a remote and unpopular tower that invaded the city's best residential sections.

When 998 Fifth Avenue was built, the Metropolitan Museum of Art's Fifth Avenue building, across the street, was much smaller and attracted far fewer people. Among the amenities the building had were wall safes, storage rooms in the basement and a large number of wood-burning fireplaces, as well as two-foot thick fireproof walls. Unlike the high-class apartment houses on the West Side, this building did not have a name. It was originally, like the vast majority of pre-war buildings, a rental. The rents were much higher compared to all the other buildings in the city: the largest units were leased for roughly $25,000, while the smaller lower floor units for $10,000–12,000. Ultimately the building's broker, Douglas Elliman, found over 100 prospects and 998 Fifth Avenue rented right away. In 1912, the magazine Architecture called it the most remarkable thing of its kind in America.

The fact that so many wealthy people rented apartments signaled the shift from the private houses to luxury buildings. The "servant problem" (fewer people willing to go into service, especially for the low wages and long hours demanded by middle-class families) and the increasing time spent by the rich outside the city, the automobile and increasing taxes also favored this shift. In less than 20 years since the building's opening, over 90% of the wealthy people in New York lived in apartments. At the time of its opening in 1912, only 5% occupied apartments. The building cost roughly $3 million (including the land).

998 Fifth Avenue was converted to a cooperative in 1953 and is one of the most selective pre-war cooperatives in New York City. It is thought to be one of the four best apartment houses on the avenue (alongside 820, 834, and 960 Fifth Avenue) and 10 best in the city. The apartments are rarely advertised and sell, depending on square footage or view, for $20 to $40 million. The building is one of the most storied on the "Gold Coast," and has been home to many well-known residents. The Astor, Guggenheim, Morton, Vanderbilt, Root, and other prominent families have lived at 998 Fifth Avenue.

== Notable tenants ==
- Len Blavatnik
- Elihu Root
- Watson Bradley Dickerman, president of the New York Stock Exchange in the 1890s
- George B. Fearing, a railroad investor and the president after 1916 of the Knickerbocker Club, a men's club at 62nd and Fifth
- Levi P. Morton, vice president of the United States under Benjamin Harrison from 1889 to 1893 and later governor of New York in 1895 and 1896
- Murry Guggenheim, a financier and mining operator who took the largest apartment
- Victor Morawetz
- Ludwig Dreyfus
- Edson Bradley
- E. Felsenheld
- Thomas A. James
- Lewis L. Clark
- Sylvia Green Wilks, heir of Hetty Green
- Steven Rattner
