= One Sutton Place South =

Residential building in Manhattan, New York

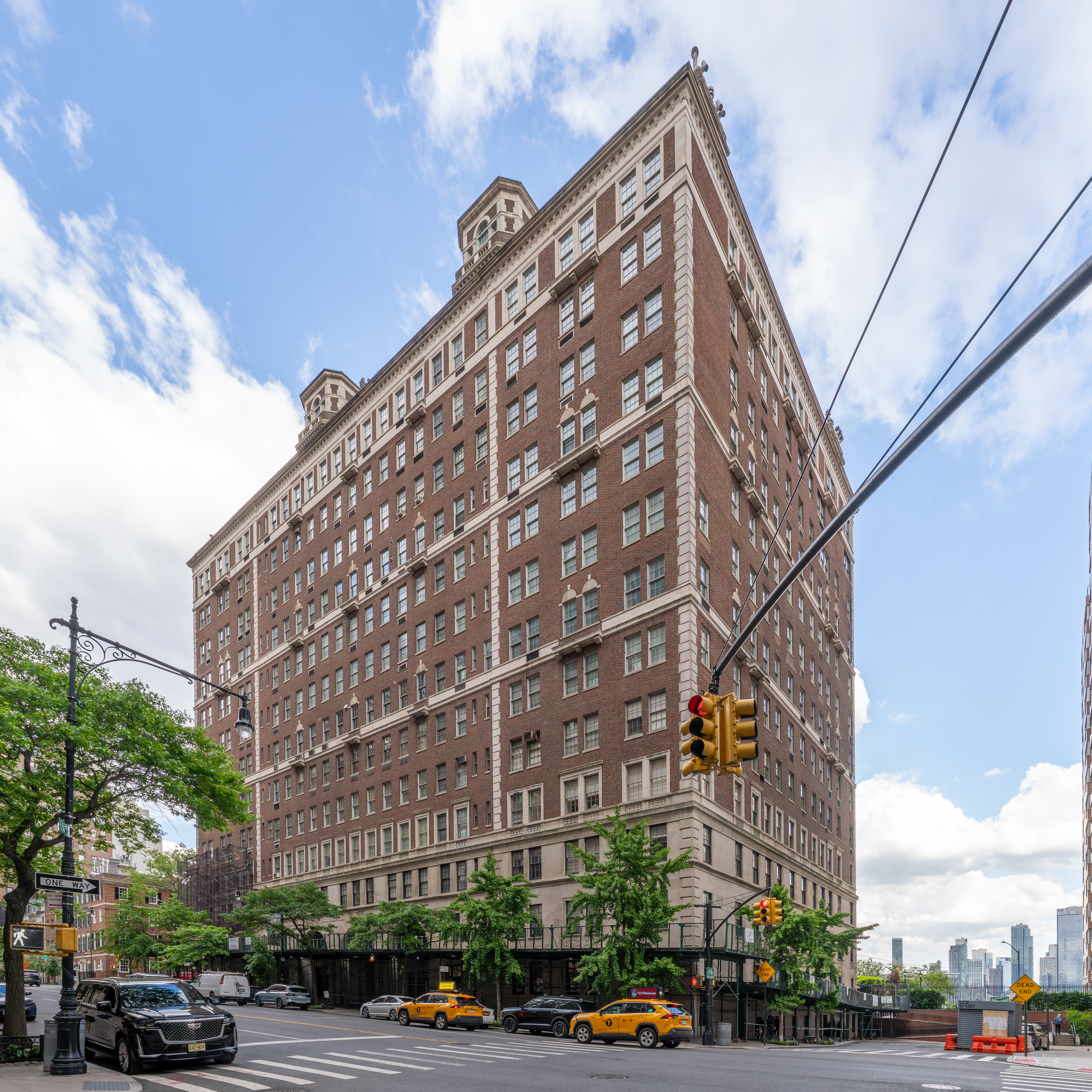
- (2026)

- Location within New York City

General information
- Type: cooperative
- Location: New York, New York, US
- Coordinates: 40.7568°N 73.9604°W
- Current tenants: approx. 42 to 60
- Construction started: 1927
- Completed: 1927

Technical details
- Structural system: Skyscraper
- Floor count: 14 (42 apartment units)

Design and construction
- Architect: Rosario Candela
- Architecture firm: Cross and Cross

One Sutton Place South is a 14-story, 42-unit cooperative apartment house in the East Midtown neighborhood of Manhattan, New York City, overlooking the East River on Sutton Place between 56th and 57th Streets. One Sutton Place South contains the residences of diplomats, titans of industry, and media executives.

== History ==
The building was designed and completed in 1927 by Rosario Candela and Cross and Cross for the Phipps family.

The building is topped by a penthouse, a 17-room unit that has 5,000 square feet (460 m^{2}) of interior space and 6,000 square feet (560 m^{2}) of terraces that wrap entirely around it; the penthouse was created originally for Amy Phipps as a duplex. When her son, Winston Guest, the polo player and husband of garden columnist C. Z. Guest, took the apartment over, the lower floor was subdivided into three separate apartments, one of which was occupied by designer Bill Blass. The Guests lived on one side of the penthouse and one of their sons, Alexander, lived on the other side for several years. The Guests sold the apartment in 1963 about the time that their daughter, socialite Cornelia Guest, was born. The apartment was then acquired by Janet Annenberg Hooker, the philanthropist who died in late 1997 and was a sister of Walter Annenberg, the communications magnate and art collector. The apartment was put on the market in early 1998.

=== Property dispute ===
A portion of the property behind One Sutton Place South was the subject of a dispute between the building's owners and the New York City Department of Parks and Recreation. Like the adjacent park, part of the rear garden at One Sutton Place South is cantilevered over the FDR Drive, a busy expressway at Manhattan's eastern edge that is not visible from most of Sutton Place. In 1939, city authorities took ownership of the property behind One Sutton Place South by condemnation in connection with the construction of the FDR Drive, then leased it back to the building. The building's lease for its backyard expired in 1990. The co-op tried unsuccessfully to extend the lease, and later made prospective apartment-buyers review the legal status of the backyard and sign a confidentiality agreement. The question of ownership came to a head in 2003 when the state's Department of Transportation began rehabilitation of FDR Drive between 54th and 63rd Streets and threatened to tear up the garden to fix the deck. In June 2007, the co-op sued the city in an attempt the keep the land, and on November 1, 2011, the co-op and the city reached an agreement in which the co-op ended its ownership claim to a smaller section of land sitting atop the deck only, with each side contributing $1 million toward the creation of a public park on the disputed portion.

== Residents ==
Residents have included Henry Phipps Jr., Amy Phipps, John Phipps, C.Z. Guest, Winston Frederick Churchill Guest, Bill Blass, Consuelo Vanderbilt, Bradley Martin Jr., Helen Phipps Martin, Charles H. Sabin, Pauline Sabin, Juliet Pierpont Morgan Hamilton, Alexander Morgan Hamilton, Walbridge Smith Taft, Edwin & Sarah Russell (nee Spencer-Churchill), Lady Sarah Consuelo Spencer-Churchill, Gertrude Robinson Smith, Marietta Peabody Tree, Carolyne Roehm, Scott Bessent, Patricia Kennedy Lawford, Anne Cox Chambers, John Fairchild, publisher of Women’s Wear Daily; and actress Sigourney Weaver.
