= 47 Plaza Street West =

Residential building in Brooklyn, New York

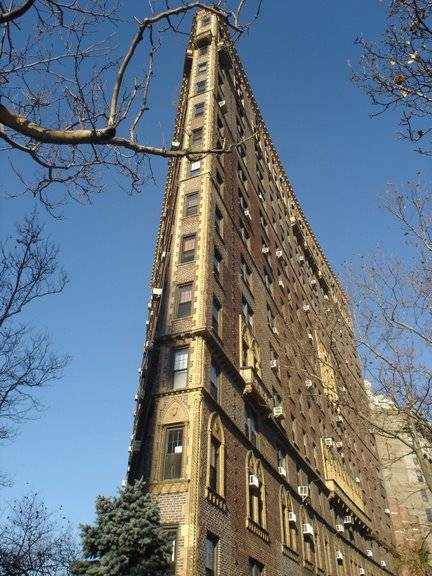

General information
- Type: Residential
- Architectural style: Venetian Gothic
- Location: 47-61 Plaza Street West, Park Slope, Brooklyn, New York City, U.S.
- Coordinates: 40°40′24″N 73°58′17″W
- Completed: 1928

Height
- Height: 165 feet

Technical details
- Floor count: 16

Design and construction
- Architect: Rosario Candela

47 Plaza Street West is an apartment building designed by the architect Rosario Candela and completed in 1928 in Park Slope, Brooklyn, New York City. The building, located next to Brooklyn's Grand Army Plaza, possesses a distinctive flatiron shape.

== History ==
In the mid 1920s Plaza Street, which had been developed as part of Park Slope's "Gold Coast" neighborhood, was mainly composed of very large single-family mansions. In 1925, with Brooklyn real estate booming, the first high-rise apartment building on Plaza Street was built, 1 Plaza Street West, at the corner of Plaza Street West and Flatbush Avenue.

Real estate brochures of the era touted Plaza Street and its environs as the "Park Avenue District of Brooklyn."

In 1926 developer Jacob Mark retained Rosario Candela to design 39 Plaza Street, at the corner of Plaza Street and Berkeley Place, known as the Berkeley Plaza Apartments. By this time Candela was very much on his way to becoming the most noted architect of luxury apartments on Manhattan's Park and Fifth Avenues.

In 1927 Mark again commissioned Candela to design the flatiron building at the corner of 47 Plaza Street West. This multiple dwelling replaced a large single-family home then occupied by shipbuilding magnate Edward P. Morse. When the new apartment building was completed in November 1928, Morse and his family rented three of the apartments.

Today, 47 Plaza Street West is included in the Park Slope Historic District, designated in 1973 by the Landmarks Preservation Commission and added to the National Register of Historic Places in 1980.

== Design ==
Candela was known for his intricate use of space in his puzzle-like design of New York City apartments.

The building was laid out with three large apartments per floor. The standard layout is one Classic 7, which culminates at the point on Union Street, and two Classic 6 apartments. Although the Plaza Street facade is concave, the point culminates at an angle of 47 degrees.

Including the doctors' suites and the superintendent's flat, there are 47 units.The elevator that leads to the grand penthouse has a panel in the Mahogany wood interior that flips open to reveal the front door of the penthouse. The access to the other apartments is through a standard elevator door.

The exterior is perhaps one of Candela's most distinctive and is done in an Italianate Venetian Gothic style. The point was designed with a right angle at the corner of Plaza and Union streets so that, if looked at from the correct perspective, the structure appears to be a wafer no wider the six feet.

== Significance ==
Candela designed only two pre-war residential buildings in Brooklyn, 39 and 47 Plaza Street, both for real estate developer Jacob Mark, both on the same block.

47 Plaza Street has a prominent position at the southwestern edge of Grand Army Plaza.

== In popular culture ==
The manually operated elevators at 47 Plaza Street West were featured in a New York Times article in the December 15, 2017 edition of the newspaper https://www.nytimes.com/2017/12/15/nyregion/manual-elevators-operators.html.

The piece, written by Andy Newman, was devoted to the diminishing number of manual elevators in New York City buildings and focused in large part on 47 Plaza Street West and one of its elevator operators.
