= Warburton House =

- U.S. National Register of Historic Places
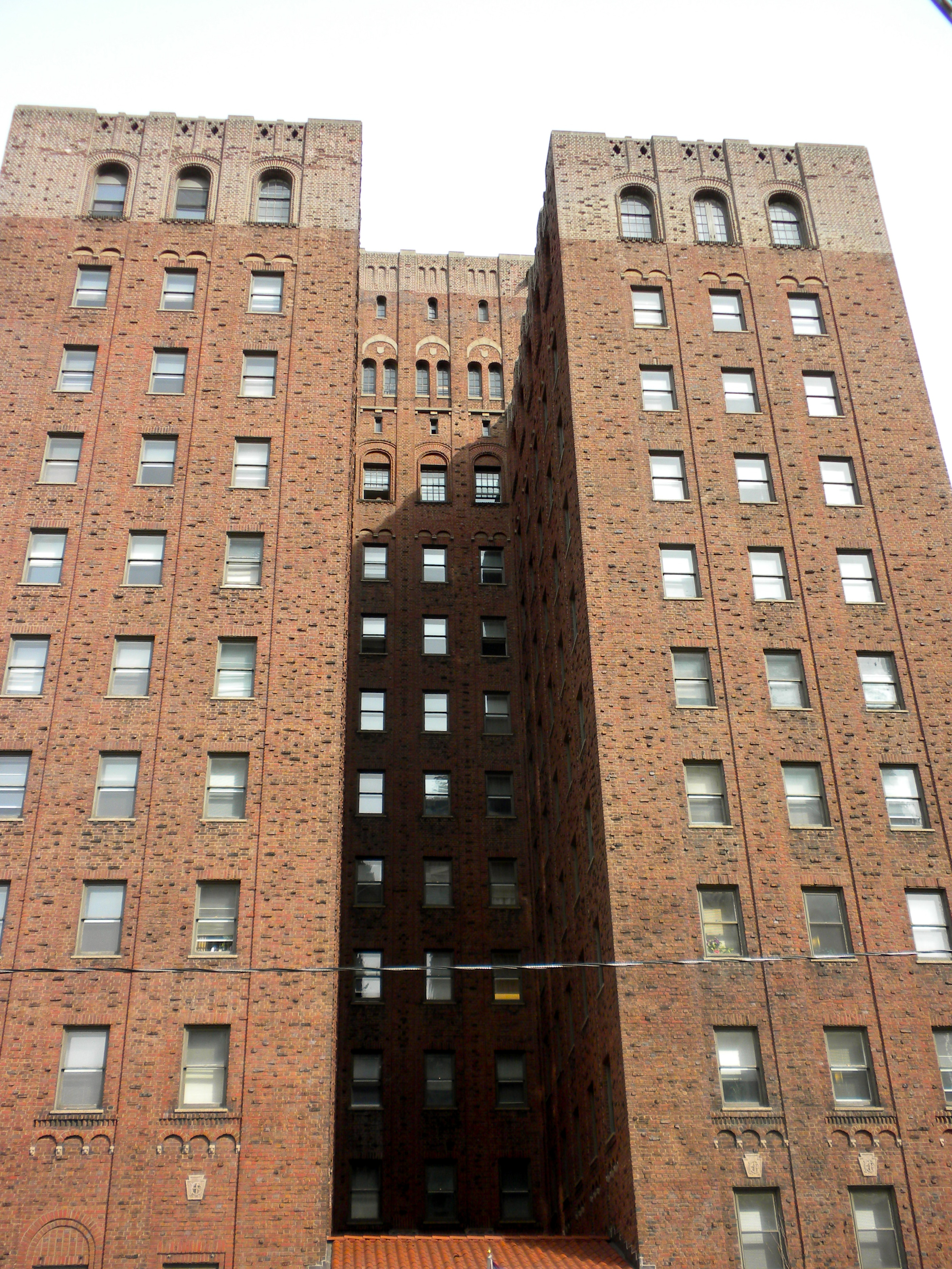
- Warburton House, February 2010

- Location within Philadelphia Location within Pennsylvania Location within the United States
- Location: 1929 Sansom Street, Philadelphia, Pennsylvania
- Coordinates: 39°57′5″N 75°10′26″W
- Area: less than an acre
- Built: 1926
- Architect: Harmon, Arthur Loomis
- Architectural style: Italian Renaissance Revival
- NRHP reference No.: 02000890
- Added to NRHP: August 22, 2002

Warburton House, also known as the Warburton Hotel and The Lucy Eaton Smith Residence, is an historic hotel that is located in the Rittenhouse Square East neighborhood of Philadelphia, Pennsylvania, United States. It was named for Lucy Eaton Smith, whose name in religious life was Mother Mary Catherine De Ricci of the Sacred Heart, who founded a Dominican pontifical institute in Albany, New York.

== History and architectural features ==
Designed by noted New York architect Arthur Loomis Harmon (1878–1958) and built in 1926, this historic structure is an eleven-story, U-shaped, steel frame and brick building with cast stone and granite trim that was created in an Italian Renaissance Revival style. It has a stepped back form and rooftop loggia and was originally built as a residential hotel for professional women. From 1952 to 2001, it was owned by the Dominican House of Retreats and Catholic Guild and known as The Lucy Eaton Smith Residence.

It was added to the National Register of Historic Places in 2002.

In 1924, the Emergency Aid of Pennsylvania (EAP, a WWI relief organization) celebrated its tenth anniversary by planning a women's building as a memorial to the organization where it would also establish permanent headquarters. The hotel would be open to all women. Mary Brown Warburton, then president of the EAP, hired New York architect Arthur Loomis Harmon to design a multi-story hotel building in the heart of Philadelphia's growing downtown. The site of the hotel was selected on the northeast comer of South 20th and Sansom Streets where several earlier nineteenth century rowhouses were recently demolished. When completed, the Italian Renaissance Revival styled hotel had a full service restaurant, snack bar, ballroom and roof top band alcove. There were 150 guestrooms situated on the upper nine floors of the building. In February of 1927, the Warburton House opened and the EAP moved its headquarters into the building. A cast stone lintel was incorporated into the Sansom Street elevation proclaiming the building the Emergency Aid Building. The building was known as and advertised as the Warburton House in honor of Mary Brown Warburton.

The hotel became a bustling place. Women from every state and territory as well as many foreign countries signed the guest register. During that time, the organization greatly expanded its services. It distributed food, clothing, and healthcare accessories for indigent families and offered vocation training and sewing classes to children disabled by polio. Additional spaces were rented throughout the Warburton House providing rent money to the organization and offering services to the hotel guests. The 1930 City Directory of Philadelphia lists five small businesses along South 20th Street in addition to the EAP: a tailor, Bertha Page, a milliner, a florist, and an optician. It is not known where in the building these retail spaces were but presumably they occupied the South 20th Street storefront ground floor level.'

In May of 1943, EAP moved its headquarters and sold the building. It continued to operate as a hotel under several ownership changes until 1952 when it was sold to the Dominican House of Retreats and Catholic Guild for $485,000. The Dominican Sisters renamed the establishment the Lucy Eaton Smith Residence in honor of the founder of the Dominican Congregation of St. Catherine de' Ricci. The sisters purchased the building for use as a residence ministry, offering long-term accommodations for single women. By August of 1952, the hotel was full of 150 residents including businesswomen, nurses, teachers, musicians and students.

The Lucy Eaton Smith Residence, as the Dominican Sisters now called the building, was altered to suit the new owners' needs. The ballroom was transformed into a chapel with the addition of an altar and pews. The former full-service restaurant was no longer used although the space was left intact complete with banquettes. The snack bar did remain in operation for a few more years, with the Sisters serving breakfast to the residents. It too was eventually closed. In 1957, Bemard W. Roney, AIA was hired to complete some alterations to the public spaces to the building. The lobby and its entrance vestibule were altered. Roney also made more renovations to the historic ballroom. The double doors that opened out on the gallery overlooking the hotel lobby were removed and replaced with single doors. These 1957 changes were kept to a minimum and little if any alterations were completed to the upper floors of the hotel. Other than changes of furnishings, little alteration had been completed to the hotel rooms. Very little modernization to the building's systems or building fabric had been completed during the Sister's ownership other than the replacement of the two passenger elevators, installed circa 1986.

The Dominican Congregation sold the Lucy Eaton Smith Residence in 2001, as the aging Sisters were unable to operate a large facility. The property was acquired by Project H.O.M.E. as a Rehabilitation Investment Tax Credit project and its 150 rooms were converted into 144 redesigned affordable apartments now known as Kate's Place.
