= Gaetan Ajello =

Sicilian born American architect

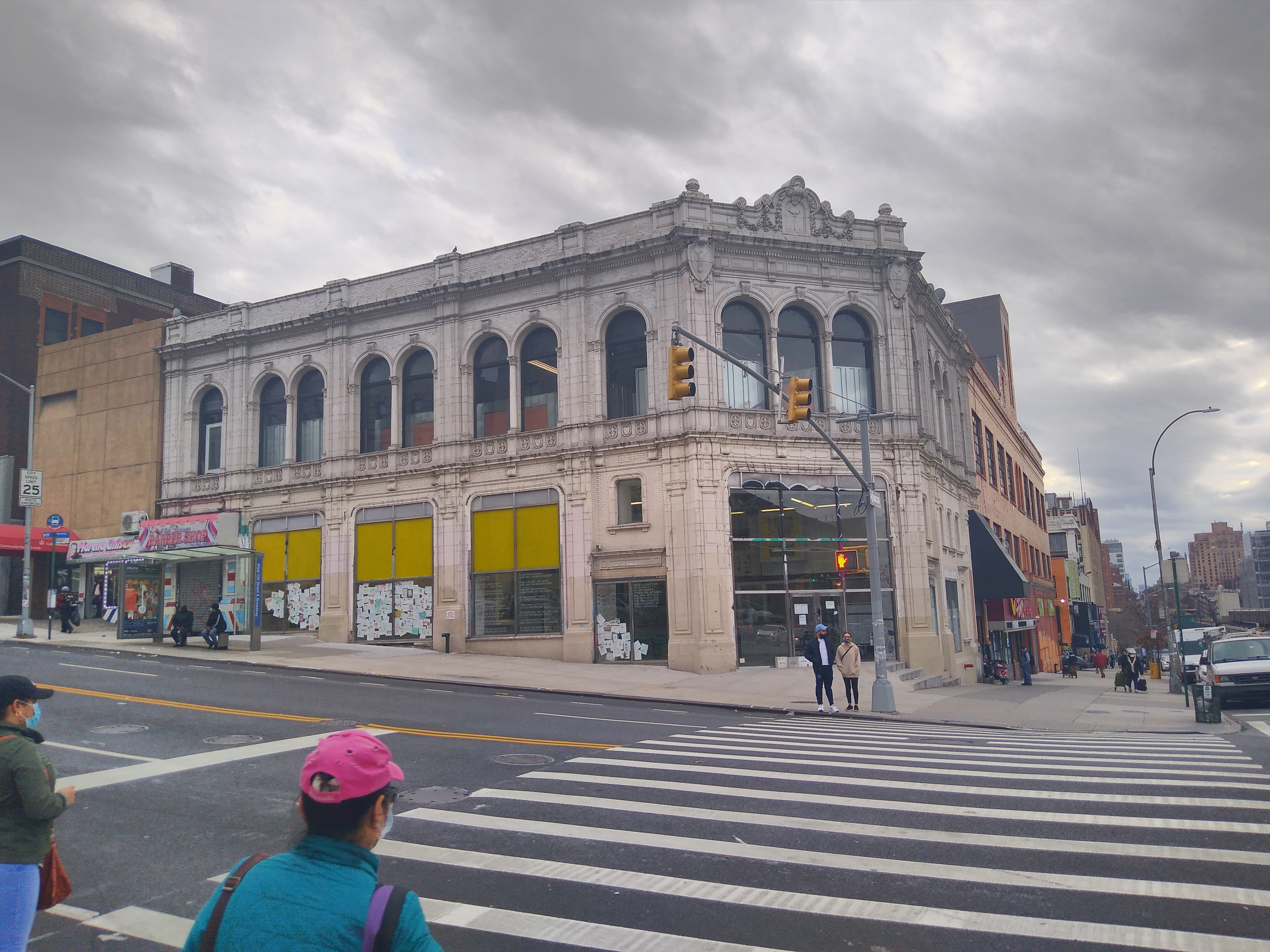
The Claremont Theatre building designed by architect Gaetan Ajello

Gaetan Ajello (1883–1983) was a New York-based architect. Born in Sicily, Ajello migrated to the United States in 1902.

== Styles and design ==
Gaetan (Gaetano) Ajello is best known for his architecturally significant apartment houses located on Manhattan’s Upper West Side. Ajello designed thirty-eight apartment houses during his twenty-year career, and while most of them have survived intact, some have been altered.

He engaged in both Renaissance architecture and Neoclassical architecture styles, but he consistently used limestone and terracotta. He also often included Tiffany-style windowed lobbies in his designs.

Ajello also often designed lobbies that would shield from first view the elevators, presenting instead a staircase with a curved balustrade in order to recreate the experience of entering a single-family home.

His buildings commonly carry a cornerstone with the carved legend "G. Ajello, Architect".

In 1912, Architecture and Building devoted an entire article to his architecture. The piece included photographs and plans of nine apartment houses. This same year, Ajello began working for the Paterno and Campagna families, two of the most influential apartment developers of their day. According to the New York City Landmarks Preservation Commission, Ajello's last known commission was 395 Riverside Drive, a $2 million project, completed in the mid-1920s.

He gave Rosario Candela, a fellow Sicilian, his first architectural job.

== Awards and recognition ==
In 2006, the Claremont Theater, in the Manhattanville neighborhood of New York City, Ajello's only known non-residential work, was designated as a Landmark by the New York Landmarks Preservation Commission. Thomas Edison once shot a short film in 1915 featuring the building's entrance
