= Murray H. Goodman =

American real estate developer (1925–2024)

- Born: November 10, 1925; Bethlehem, Pennsylvania, U.S.
- Died: December 21, 2024 (aged 99)
- Education: Liberty High School; Lehigh University (BBA)
- Occupation: Real estate developer
- Title: Founder and chairman, The Goodman Company
- Spouse: Joanie Mellor Goodman
- Children: 5
- Website: www.thegoodmancompany.com

Murray Henry Goodman (November 10, 1925 – December 21, 2024) was an American real estate developer, philanthropist, and founder of Goodman Properties, also known as The Goodman Company. He was, at the time of his death, Lehigh University's most generous living benefactor, and the Goodman Campus and 16,000-seat Goodman Stadium at the university are named in his honor.

== Early life and education ==
Goodman was born in Bethlehem, Pennsylvania, on November 10, 1925, and was educated at Liberty High School in Bethlehem.

Goodman served in the United States Air Force for 2.5 years. He then received a bachelor's degree in business administration from Lehigh University, where he was captain of Lehigh's basketball team in 1947 and graduated in 1948.

== Career ==
The Goodman Company, headquartered in West Palm Beach, Florida, was founded in 1960 in Allentown, Pennsylvania. It has actively and successfully developed regional malls and power centers throughout Pennsylvania, Florida, New Jersey, Virginia, and Ohio for over five decades. Goodman began his career as a general contractor, constructing institutional buildings and developing supermarkets, service stations, and small shopping centers in eastern Pennsylvania. The company was an early pioneer in the development and management of regional and super-regional malls with more than 24 million square feet of commercial space.

In 1980, he developed The Esplanade on Worth Avenue in Palm Beach, Florida. Since 2004, it changed its name to 150 Worth. In 2014, Goodman sold it for $146 million.

Goodman has developed, owned and managed over 18 million square feet of shopping malls from Neptune, New Jersey, to Bethlehem, Pennsylvania. The company is no longer building any ground up projects, but is seeking to buy existing retail properties in Florida, Texas, Nevada, Washington, Wyoming, South Dakota, Tennessee, and New Hampshire.

Goodman was a long-time member and trustee of the International Council of Shopping Centers. He has previously been ranked as one of the leading developers and managers of shopping malls by Shopping Center World, a trade publication.

== Philanthropy ==
The Goodman Campus, one of three at Lehigh University, is named in his honor, Goodman having donated 550 acres in Lower Saucon Township, Pennsylvania, in 1983 to build a sports complex, including the 16,000-seat Murray H. Goodman Stadium. He was Lehigh's most generous living benefactor.

== Personal life and death ==
Goodman was married to Joanie Mellor Goodman, they have five children, and lived in Palm Beach, Florida. They originally lived in Pennsylvania. In 2009, Goodman listed his apartment at 960 Fifth Avenue in Manhattan at $32.5 million, but sold it to Benjamin Steinbruch two years later for $18.875 million. In 2015, he sold Turtle Lane Farm, his family's "lavish equestrian property" in Wellington, Florida for $9.675 million.

In 2013, their daughter Marley Goodman, a real estate agent and former member of the U.S. Equestrian Team, married Brett Overman, president and CEO of National Disaster Solutions and Zip's Car Wash, also of Palm Beach, at the Mar-a-Lago Club, with Rabbi Solomon Rothstein officiating. They have a son, Malcolm Goodman.

Goodman died on December 21, 2024, at the age of 99.
