= 720 Park Avenue =

Apartment building in Manhattan, New York

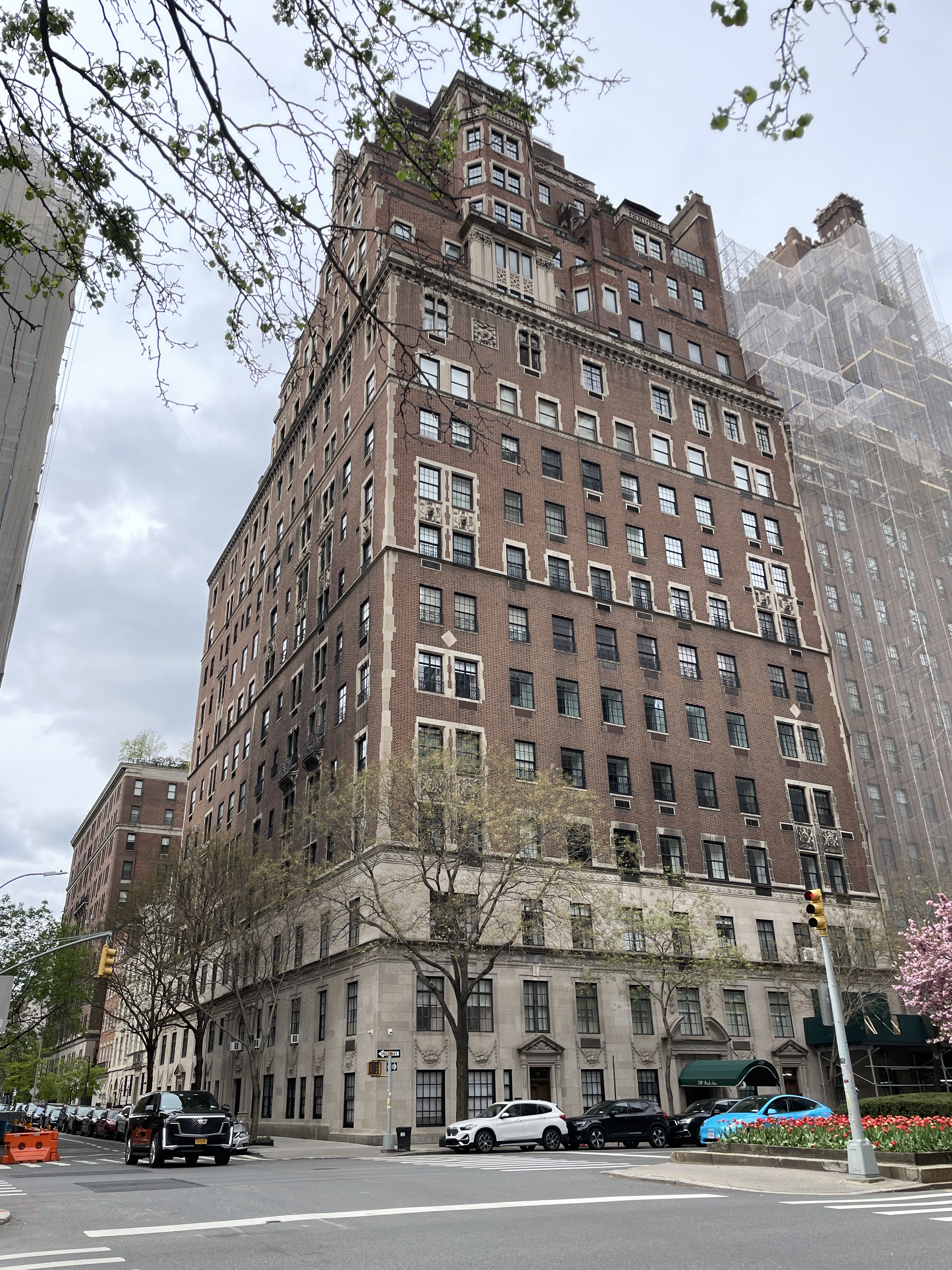
- Interactive map of the 720 Park Avenue area

General information
- Architectural style: Neoclassical architecture
- Location: 720 Park Avenue, Manhattan, New York, U.S.
- Coordinates: 40.7702°N 73.96491°W
- Completed: 1928

Technical details
- Floor count: 17

Design and construction
- Architects: Cross & Cross; Rosario Candela

720 Park Avenue is a historic residential building in Lenox Hill on the Upper East Side of Manhattan in New York City, New York, U.S. A cooperative, the building has 34 apartments, a gymnasium and storage spaces. It is secured by a full-time doorman.

== History ==
The 17-story building was completed in 1928. It was designed by Cross & Cross and Rosario Candela in the Neoclassical architectural style. It is 62.18 meters tall.

In the 1930s, Jesse I. Straus, the co-owner of Macy's who served as the United States Ambassador to France from 1933 to 1936, lived in a duplex in this building.

In 2008, diplomat Carl Spielvogel, who served as the United States Ambassador to the Slovak Republic from 2000 to 2001, sold his apartment in the building to businessman Peter S. Kraus, the chairman and chief executive officer of AllianceBernstein, for US$37 million. In 2013, an apartment was listed for US$25 million.
