= 778 Park Avenue =

Apartment building in Manhattan, New York

General information
- Status: Completed
- Type: Cooperative apartment building
- Location: 778 Park Avenue Manhattan, New York City, New York, United States
- Coordinates: 40°46′19″N 73°57′49″W
- Completed: 1931

Technical details
- Floor count: 18

Design and construction
- Architect: Rosario Candela

778 Park Avenue is a luxury residential building in the Upper East Side Historic District on the northeast corner of 73rd Street and Park Avenue. The 18-story English Renaissance apartment house was designed by Rosario Candela who is widely considered to have been America's greatest designer of luxury apartment buildings. It was built in 1931 and is one of the most coveted buildings in New York City. It has a four-story limestone base. In 1983 it won the first annual Excellence in Conservation Award from Friends of the Upper East Side.

The building's ground floor maisonette – which also boasts its own private, and symmetrical, address of 73 East 73rd Street – entertained legions of New York City's elite as the headquarters for high-society conservatism with the home's hosts.

Veronica Cooper (née Balfe) married actor Gary Cooper on December 15, 1933, at her mother's home in the very exclusive coop; the wedding had been planned for the Waldorf Astoria hotel, but the location was probably changed to avoid public attention.

== In popular culture ==
The building has been mentioned in James Trager's literary book titled Park Avenue, Street of Dreams and Kirk Henckles' and Anne Walker's book titled Life at the Top: New York's Exceptional Apartment Buildings.

== Notable residents ==
- Roone Arledge
- Brooke Astor, philanthropist
- Armand Phillip Bartos
- William F. Buckley Jr. and Patricia Buckley, in the ground-floor maisonette
- Claudia Cohen
- Gary Cooper and Veronica Cooper
- Joan Kaplan Davidson, philanthropist
- Lawrence Herbert, founder of Pantone
- John B. Hess
- William P. Lauder
- Clifton S. Robbins
- James D. Robinson III, former chief executive officer of American Express
- Mark Rockefeller
- Vera Wang
- Thomas J. Watson, co-founder of IBM
- Zygi Wilf
