= Peter S. Kraus =

Former American finance executive

- Born: Philadelphia, Pennsylvania, U.S.
- Education: Trinity College; New York University Stern School of Business
- Occupation: Businessman
- Known for: Former chairman and chief executive officer of AllianceBernstein
- Spouse: Jill Kraus

Peter S. Kraus is an American businessman, philanthropist and art collector who currently serves as the chairman and CEO of Aperture Investors, an asset management firm which he founded in 2018. From 2008 through 2017, Kraus was the chairman and chief executive officer of AllianceBernstein (AB), a global asset management firm with approximately US$400 billion under management listed on the New York Stock Exchange as NYSE: AB. Prior to that, Kraus worked for Goldman Sachs for two decades. He is one of the largest collectors of contemporary art in the world.

== Early life ==
Peter S. Kraus was born in Philadelphia, Pennsylvania. He graduated with a Bachelor of Arts degree from Trinity College in 1974. He received a master in business administration from the New York University Stern School of Business in 1975.

== Career ==
Kraus worked at Goldman Sachs for twenty-two years. He briefly served as executive vice president and head of strategy at Merrill Lynch from September to December 2008. He earned US$29.6 million during those three months, including a US$25 million golden parachute. He was subpoenaed by Attorney General Andrew Cuomo for his compensation.

Kraus served as the chairman and chief executive officer of AllianceBernstein from December 2008 through May 2017, replacing Lewis A. Sanders. Kraus joined the Axa Management Committee April 2010. He earned US$52 million during his first year. Under his leadership, both the New York State and Local Retirement System and The Vanguard Group pulled their investments out of AB. For example, the firm's assets under management went from US$462 billion in December 2008 to US$402 in November 2011. However, The New York Post suggested he had "succeeded in pulling AllianceBernstein away from the brink of disaster and is steering it back on track." By the end of 2016, Bernstein had US$480 billion under management.

On May 1, 2017, AB's board of directors announced that they had appointed Robert B. Zoelnick as chairman of the board and Seth Bernstein as CEO of AB to replace Kraus. In the press release announcing this news, Denis Duverne, chairman of Axa's board of directors and a long-time member of the AB Board stated: "We thank Peter Kraus for his service to AB and its stakeholders since taking over in the challenging environment of 2008. He has built a strong team and we believe the company is well positioned for an excellent future. We wish him well."

Kraus currently serves as the chairman and CEO of asset management company Aperture Investors. A longtime evangelist of performance-linked fee structures, he launched the company in September 2018 with Assicurazioni Generali SpA, one of the largest insurance and asset management groups in the world. Aperture Investors boasts a disruptive revenue model, with management fees and compensation structures designed to align clients’ interests with their own. The firm charges ETF-like fees, which can only go higher when managers beat their benchmarks. Similarly, managers are paid modest base compensation and can only earn more when they generate outperformance, a major departure from the traditional fixed-fee structure in which managers are compensated based on the volume of assets managed.

== Philanthropy ==
Kraus serves as the chair of the board of overseers of the California Institute of the Arts, a private university in Los Angeles. He is also the co-chair of the Friends of Carnegie International, an annual exhibition of Northern American art. Additionally, he serves on the board of directors of the Lincoln Center for the Performing Arts in New York City.

== Personal life ==
Kraus is married to Jill Kraus, who serves as the chair of the Public Art Fund. They reside in a five-bedroom apartment at 720 Park Avenue on Park Avenue, in Lenox Hill on the Upper East Side of Manhattan, New York City. Kraus purchased the apartment for US$37 million from Carl Spielvogel. In 2010, Kraus and his wife were listed on the "world's top 200 art collectors" for their contemporary art collection. Art follows him in the office, where a sculpture by Manfred Pernice and Su-Mei Tse's video Les Balayeurs du désert are on display.
