= The New York Apartment Houses of Rosario Candela and James Carpenter =

Book by Andrew Alpern

- Cover of hardcover edition
- Author: Andrew Alpern
- Language: English
- Subject: Architecture, history
- Genre: Non-fiction
- Published: February 2, 2002
- Publisher: Acanthus Press
- Publication place: United States
- Media type: Print
- Pages: 350 pp.
- ISBN: 978-0926494206
- OCLC: 46385874

The New York Apartment Houses of Rosario Candela and James Carpenter is an illustrated book by American architecture historian Andrew Alpern. The book was initially published on February 2, 2002, by Acanthus Press. The book discusses the works of prominent New York architects of the 1920s and 1930s, Rosario Candela and J. E. R. Carpenter, who helped shape whole blocks in Manhattan. Their buildings are now the standard residentials of the New York's elite. The book contains a large number of photos and original floorplans of the discussed buildings, and several essays.

== See also ==
- 740 Park: The Story of the World's Richest Apartment Building
- Art Deco Architecture: Design, Decoration and Detail from the Twenties and Thirties
