= Rosario Candela =

American architect (1890–1953)

- Born: March 7, 1890; Montelepre, Italy
- Died: October 3, 1953 (aged 63); Mount Vernon, New York
- Education: Columbia University School of Architecture
- Occupation: Architect
- Spouse: Felicia
- Parent(s): Michelle and Josephine (née Pizzurro)
- Buildings: 740 Park Avenue; 778 Park Avenue; 834 Fifth Avenue; 960 Fifth Avenue; One Sutton Place South

Rosario Candela (March 7, 1890 – October 3, 1953) was an Italian American architect who achieved renown through his apartment building designs in New York City, primarily during the boom years of the 1920s. He is credited with defining the city's characteristic terraced setbacks and signature penthouses. Over time, Candela's buildings have become some of New York's most coveted addresses. As architectural historian Christopher Gray has written: "Rosario Candela has replaced Stanford White as the real estate brokers' name-drop of choice. Nowadays, to own a 10- to 20-room apartment in a Candela-designed building is to accede to architectural as well as social cynosure."

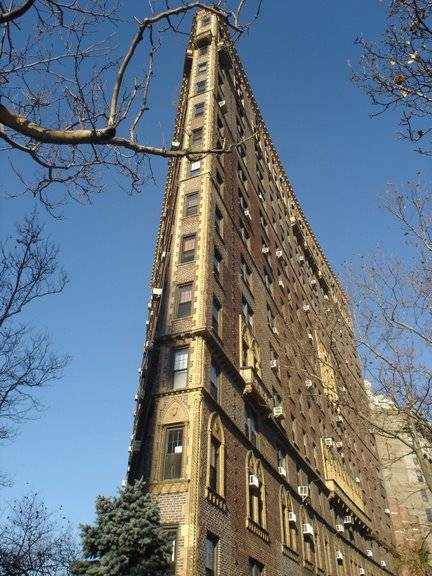
Candela's flatiron building at 47 Plaza Street West, Brooklyn, New York

== Life ==
=== Early life and education ===
Born in Montelepre, Italy in 1890, Candela immigrated to New York in 1906. He returned to Italy after his arrival to study there and returned to the US in 1909. His father was Michele Candela, a plasterer, and his mother was Josephine Pizzurro. He gained admission to the Columbia University School of Architecture and graduated in 1915. Keenly aware of his talent, he went so far as to erect a velvet rope around his drafting table to prevent other students from copying his designs.

=== Career ===
After graduation, Candela worked briefly as a draftsman for the Palermo-born Italian-American architect, Gaetan Ajello. After another brief stint with the firm of Frederick Sterner, Candela set up his own practice in 1920. His first major commission was for an apartment house at West 92nd Street and Broadway. Shortly thereafter, he received his first commission for an East Side apartment at 1105 Park Avenue. During the next five years, Candela designed a number of residential buildings on the Upper West Side, primarily on West End Avenue and Riverside Drive. During this period, the West side was undergoing an intense transformation from an area of primarily single-family homes to one characterized by the apartment buildings.

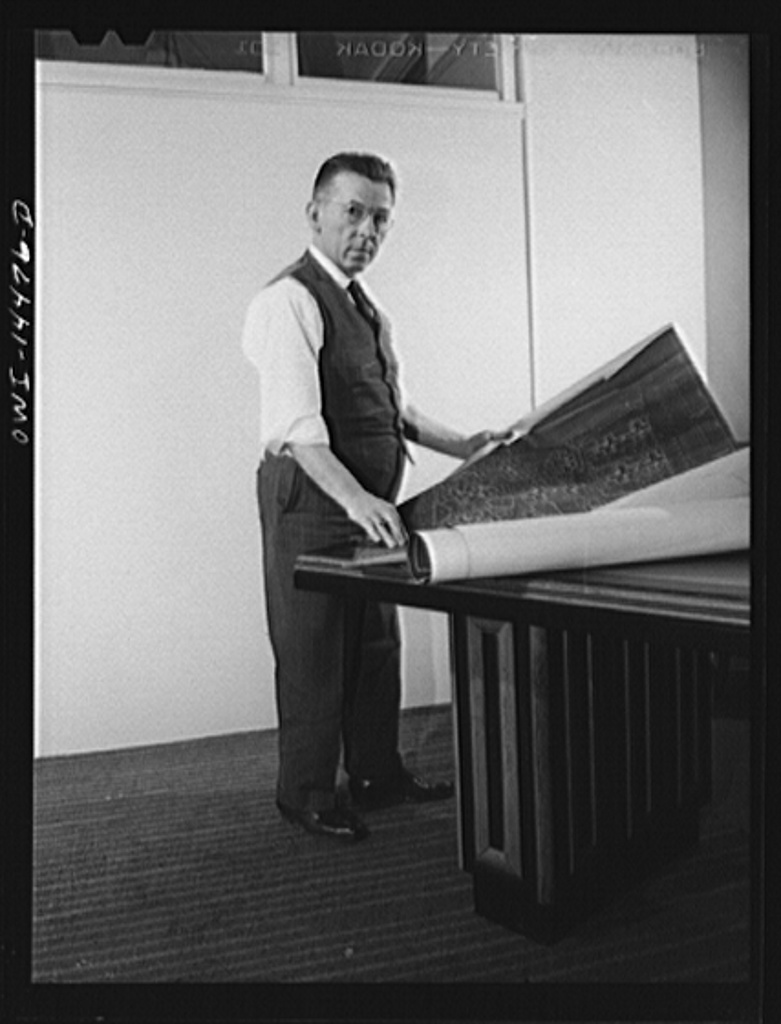
Candela in January 1943, designing public housing in Brooklyn

Candela's greatest work would occur during the latter half of the 1920s, when he designed numerous apartment buildings on the Upper East Side, primarily on Fifth Avenue and Park Avenue, as well as at Sutton Place and other locations. In 1927 and 1928, Candela designed 19 apartment buildings, including 960 Fifth Avenue (at East 77th Street) and 720 Park Avenue (at East 70th Street). He had more commissions in 1929, but the housing boom had begun to slow prior to the stock market crash in October. Of 27 designs that year, only 12 were completed. These included 740, 770, 778 and 834 and 1040 Fifth Avenue.

The exteriors of his buildings tended to be understated, particularly in view of some of the more exuberant styles popular during the period. However, he was considered a master of design when it came to the interiors. Many apartments were constructed as duplex residences with grand entry foyers; curved, freestanding stairways; and dramatic public rooms. Some of the designs, including that of the John D. Rockefeller Jr. triplex at 740 Park Avenue, were palatial by even the considerable standards of the day. That triplex, of more than 20,000 square feet (1,900 m^{2}), "had, depending on who was counting, anywhere from 23 to 37 rooms, the discrepancy caused by such questions as whether one included hallways and foyers the size of ballrooms, servants quarters, and the fourteen bathrooms".

During the Great Depression, work fell off dramatically and Candela received only sporadic commissions. While the quantity declined considerably, the quality of his designs rarely suffered. During this time, he expressed his interest in codes and ciphers, publishing two books on the topic. He continued his practice up until his death in 1953. Chesley Bonestell, first an architect, and later a noted science fiction illustrator, painted two pictures for him, one of his home and one of his son.

=== Cryptography ===
Candela began studying cryptography in 1930 after learning about the accomplishments of the Army Signal Corps in WWI. He decrypted messages originally coded in 1898 by Commandant Étienne Bazeries of the French Army. Commandant Bazeries was "one of the most brilliant cryptologists of his era," and developed an encryption method considered unbreakable. Candela wrote a book, The Military Cipher of Commandant Bazeries, in 1938 detailing how he broke Bazeries' code. Starting in 1941, Candela taught a class on cryptography and cryptanalytics at Hunter College in New York. At the time, the course was considered the only one of its kind offered to the public in the United States. When the war came, he worked for the OSS — the forerunner of the CIA.

=== Books by Candela ===
- Candela, Rosario (1938). The Military Cipher of Commandant Bazeries — An Essay in Decrypting. New York: Cardanus Press. OCLC 814084.
- Candela, Rosario (1946). Isomorphism and Its Applications in Cryptanalytics. New York: Cardanus Press. OCLC 708605.

== Bibliography ==
- Gross, Michael (2005). 740 Park: The Story of the World's Richest Apartment Building. New York City: Broadway Books. ISBN 978-0385512091.
- Alpern, Andrew; Christopher Gray, preface. David Netto, foreword. The New York Apartment Houses of Rosario Candela and James Carpenter. New York: Acanthus Press, 2001. ISBN 978-0-926494-20-6

== Work ==
All within New York City unless otherwise noted. Source: Rosario Candela listing in Emporis Buildings

=== Early 1900s ===
- 575 West End Avenue, 1914

=== 1920s ===
- Clayton Apartments, 1922 (215 W. 92nd St.)
- 915 West End Avenue, 1922
- 1105 Park Avenue, 1923
- 304 West 89th Street, 1923
- 878 West End Avenue, 1923
- 522 West End Avenue, 1923
- 41 Fifth Avenue, 1923
- 320 West End Avenue, 1924
- Charleton Apartments, 1924
- 875 West End Avenue, 1924
- 865 West End Avenue, 1924
- 755 West End Avenue, 1924
- 334 West 86th Street, 1924
- 425 Riverside Drive, 1924
- 240 West End Avenue, 1924
- 40 West 55th Street, 1924
- 300 West 108th Street, 1925
- 315 West 106th Street, 1925
- Wellston Apartments (161 West 75th Street), 1925
- 855 Fifth Avenue, 1926
- 1172 Park Avenue, 1926
- 325 West 86th Street, 1926
- 800 West End Avenue, 1926
- 820 West End Avenue, 1926
- 607 West End Avenue, 1926
- 285 Riverside Drive, 1926
- Oxford Tower (280 Riverside Drive), 1926
- Berkeley Plaza Apts, 39 Plaza Street West, Brooklyn, 1926
- Brazilian Court Hotel, Palm Beach, Florida, 1925
- W New York – The Court, 1927
- 775 Park Avenue, 1927
- 884 Fifth Avenue, 1927
- 990 Fifth Avenue, 1927 – with Warren & Wetmore
- 960 Fifth Avenue, 1928 – with Warren & Wetmore
- One Sutton Place South, 1927 – with Cross and Cross
- The Windsor Park (100 West 58th Street), 1927
- The Van Doran, 1927
- 230 West End Avenue, 1927
- 2 East 67th Street (also known as 856 5th Avenue), 1928
- 4 Sutton Place, 1928
- 25 Sutton Place, 1928
- 2 East 70th Street, 1928, with Walker & Gillette
- 8 East 96th Street, 1928
- 447 East 57th Street, 1928
- 30 Sutton Place, 1928
- 47 Plaza Street West, Brooklyn, 1928
- Westwind Apartments (175 West 93rd), 1928
- 360 Central Park West (North and South Buildings), 1928
  - including Second Presbyterian Church, 4 West 96th Street
- 1500 N Lake Shore Drive, Chicago, Illinois, 1928
- 1 Gracie Square, 1929 – with William Lawrence Bottomley
- 14 Sutton Place South, 1929
- 1192 Park Avenue, 1929
- 75 Central Park West, 1929
- 70 East 96th Street Apartments, 1929
- 133 East 80th Street, 1929
- 720 Park Avenue, 1929 – with Cross & Cross
- 40 East 66th Street, 1929
- 40 West 67th Street, 1929
- 740 Park Avenue, 1929 – with Shreve & Lamb
- 995 Fifth Avenue Stanhope Hotel, 1929
- 1040 Fifth Avenue, 1929

=== 1930s ===
- 1220 Park Avenue, 1930
- 770 Park Avenue, 1930
- 1040 Fifth Avenue, 1930
- 1021 Park Avenue, 1930
- 834 Fifth Avenue, 1930
- 12 East 88th Street, 1931
- 1500 North Lake Shore Drive, Chicago, Illinois, 1931
- 56 Seventh Avenue, 1931
- 778 Park Avenue, 1931
- 2 Beekman Place, 1932
- 3 Times Square (Rialto Theatre), 1935 (replaced by Reuters Building, 2001)
- Normandie Theatre (51 East 53rd Street), 1936 (demolished in the 1950s)
- 19 East 72nd Street, with Mott B. Schmidt, 1936
- Regency Park, 1937
- 955 Fifth Avenue, 1938

Outside of New York City:

- Personal Normandy Style home in Harrison, New York 1930
- Personal homes of friends in Bronxville and Tarrytown

=== 1940s ===
- 44 East 67th Street, 1941
- 135 East 54th Street, 1948
- 1 East 66th Street, 1948

Twin apartments on Collins Ave. In Mount Vernon abutting the Fleetwood train station.

- 3103 Fairfield Avenue, Riverdale, The Bronx (1949)

=== 1950s ===
- Montclair on the Park, St. Louis, MO, 1951
- Public School 87, NY, NY, 1953
