= Arthur Loomis Harmon =

American architect (1878–1958)

- Born: July 13, 1878; Chicago, Illinois, U.S.
- Died: October 17, 1958 (aged 80); White Plains, New York, U.S.
- Education: Columbia University
- Occupation: Architect
- Practice: McKim, Mead & White, Wallis & Goodwillie, Shreve, Lamb & Harmon
- Buildings: 740 Park Avenue, Empire State Building, 3 Park Avenue

Arthur Loomis Harmon (July 13, 1878 – October 17, 1958) was an American architect. He is most famous as the design partner of the firm Shreve, Lamb and Harmon.

== Biography ==
He was born in Chicago in 1878 and graduated from Columbia University's School of Architecture in 1901. From 1902 to 1911, he practiced with the architectural firm of McKim, Mead & White. Later, he partnered with the firm of Wallis & Goodwillie before joining Shreve and Lamb to form Shreve, Lamb & Harmon. He was elected into the National Academy of Design as an Associate member in 1935 and became a full Academician in 1944.

He died on October 17, 1958, in White Plains, New York.

== Projects ==
With the firm, he designed many landmarks that still stand today. Among them are: 740 Park Avenue, the Empire State Building, and 3 Park Avenue.

Personally, he also designed several buildings of relative fame, namely the Jerusalem International YMCA, Allerton 39th Street House, Shelton Hotel (currently the New York Marriott East Side), and Warburton House.
