= Cross & Cross =

American architecture firm

Practice information
- Partners: John Walter Cross; Eliot Cross
- Founded: 1907
- Dissolved: 1942
- Location: New York City

Significant works and honors
- Buildings: General Electric Building; 20 Exchange Place; Federal Office Building

Cross & Cross (1907–1942) was a New York City-based architectural firm founded by brothers John Walter Cross and Eliot Cross.

== History ==
Cross & Cross was known as Old New York City Society's architectural firm of choice. John Cross (1878–1951) studied architecture at the Columbia University and the École des Beaux-Arts in Paris, and served as the creative half of the partnership, while Eliot Cross (1884–1949) focused on the development side of the business, particularly through his role as chairman of the Board of the real estate development firm of Webb and Knapp, which he organized in 1922. The two firms shared office space in the Knapp Building on Madison Avenue. In 1942, John Cross was elected into the National Academy of Design as an Associate Academician.

== Commissions ==
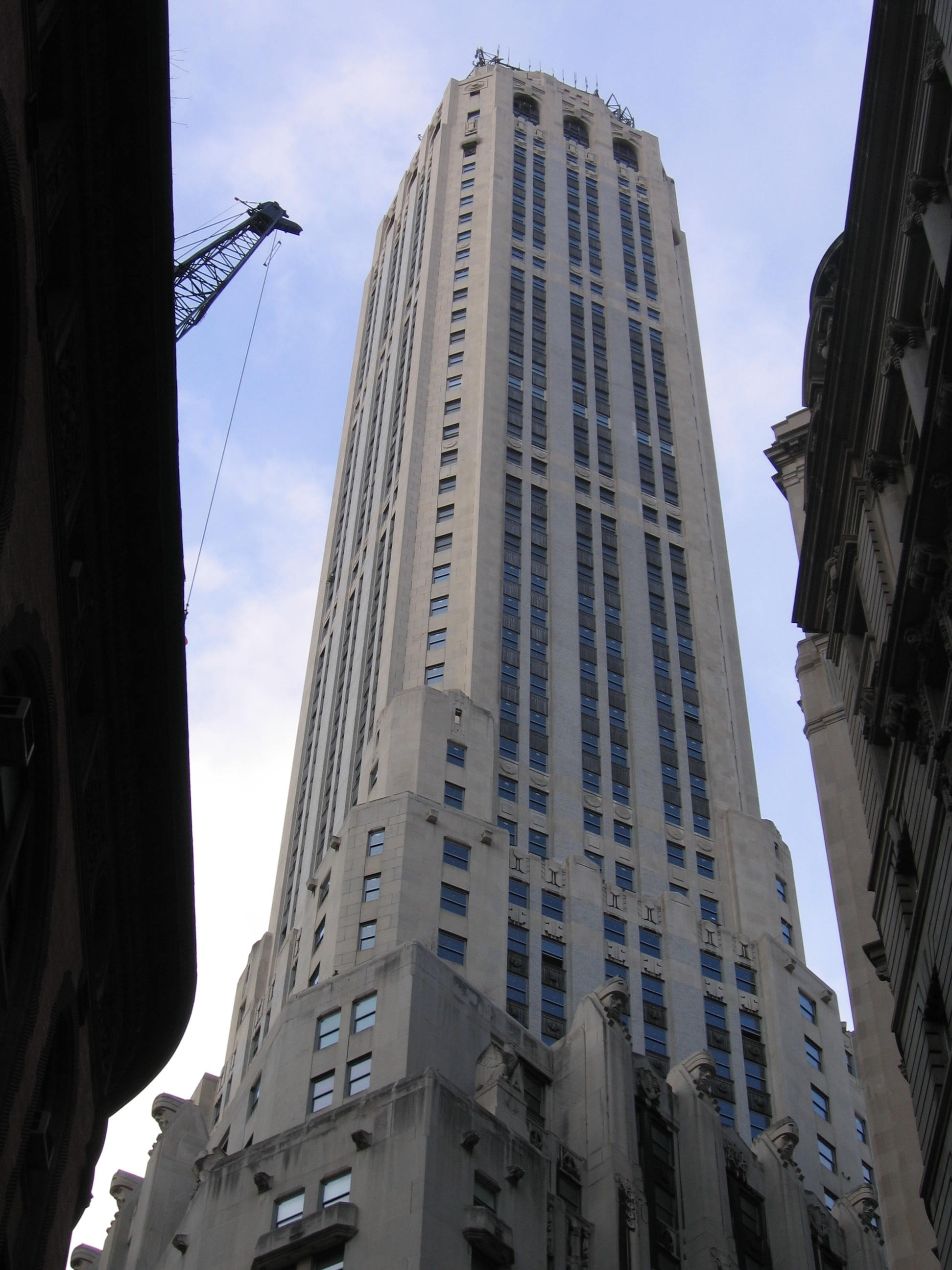
20 Exchange Place

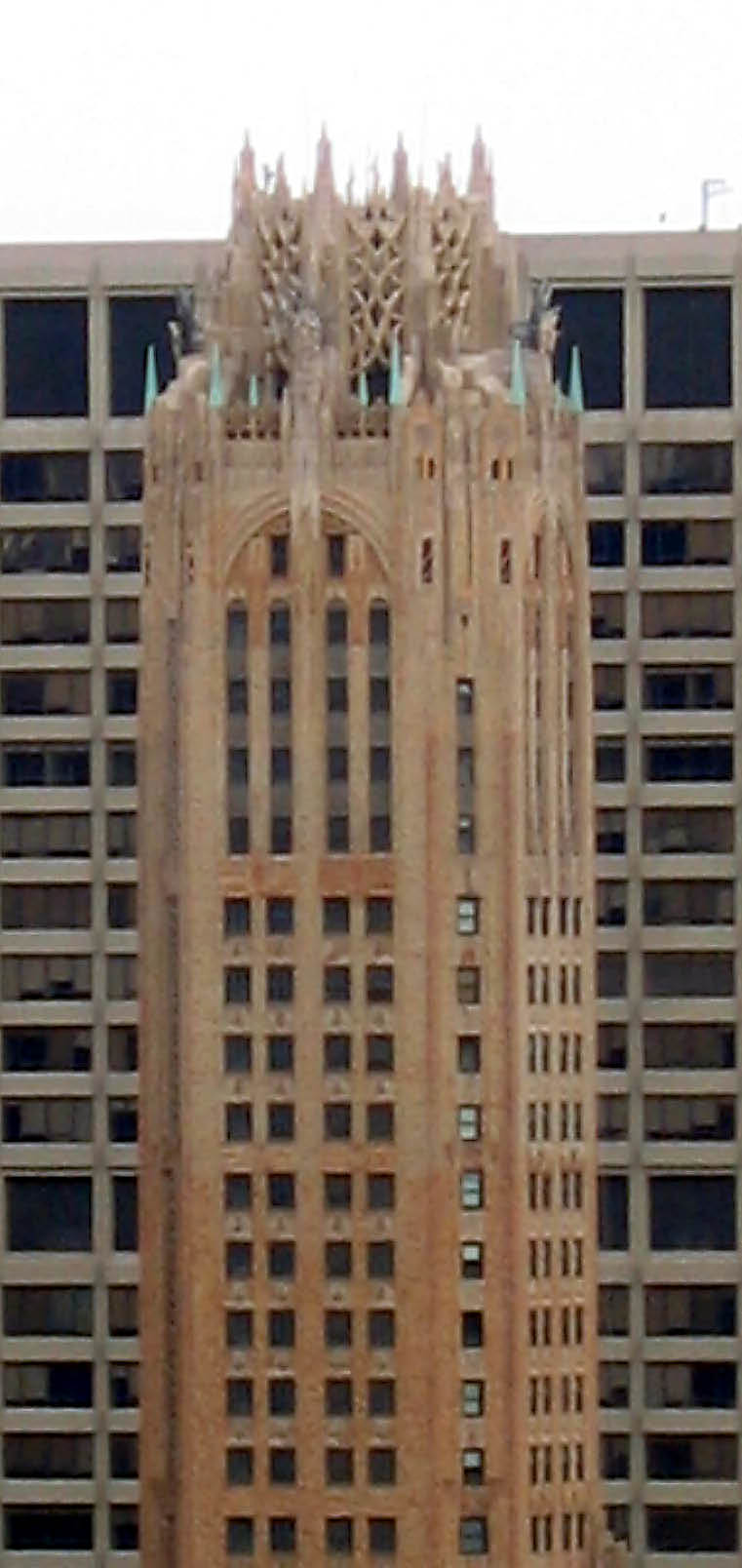
General Electric Building from the southeast

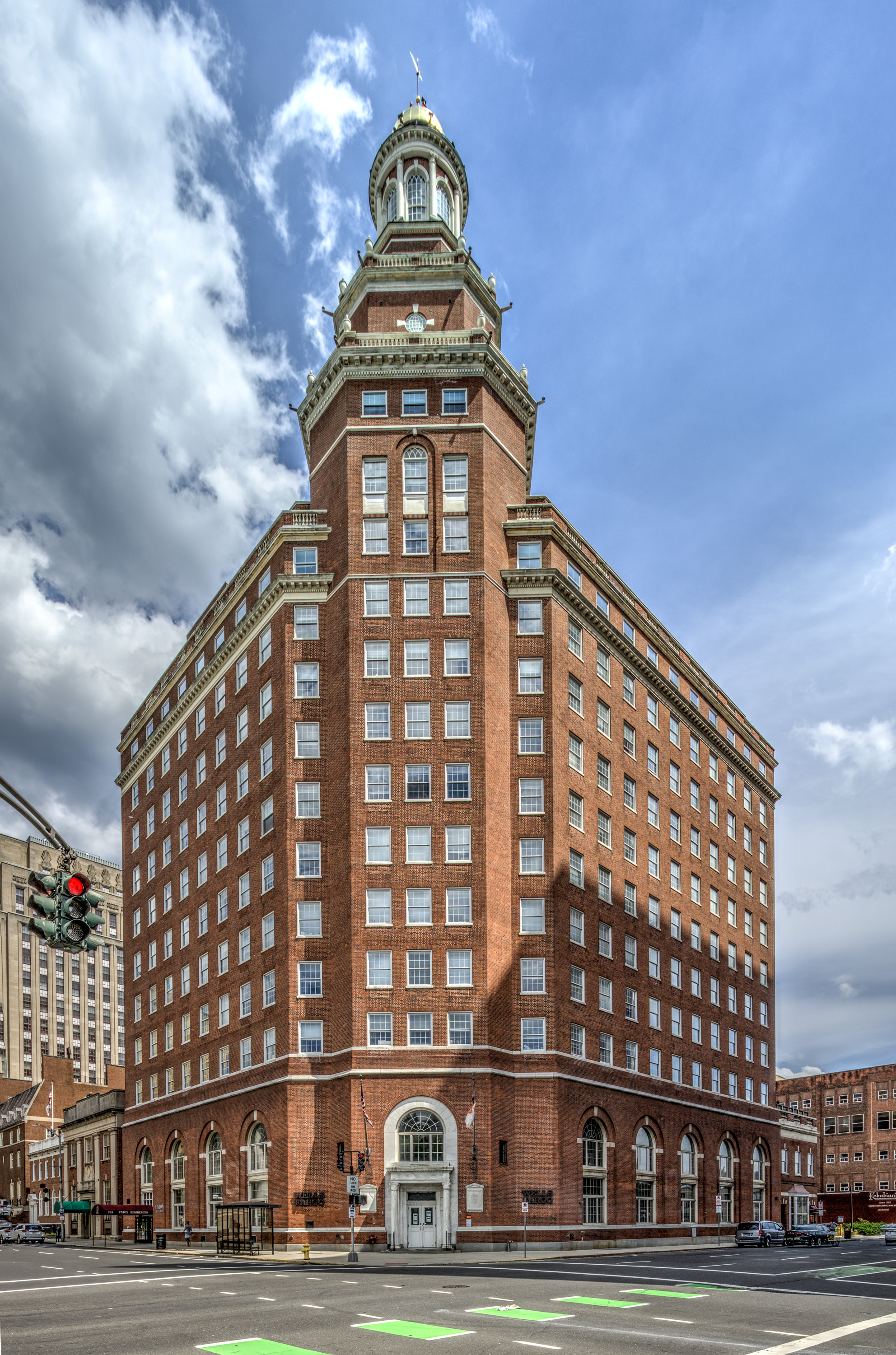
Union and New Haven Trust Building, New Haven, Connecticut

- 1 East 42nd Street, New York, NY, completed in 1927.
- 53 Park Place, New York, NY, completed in 1922.
- 123 East 53rd Street, (demolished 1953–1955 to build 399 Park Avenue, the new headquarters for the First National City Bank, today's Citigroup)
- 155 East 72nd Street, New York, NY, completed in 1928.
- 405 Park Avenue, New York, NY, a 12-story apartment building, completed in 1915 (completely altered in 1957).
- 720 Park Avenue, with Rosario Candela, New York, NY, completed in 1929.
- Ampico Building, 29 West 57th Street, New York, NY, completed in 1924.
- The Hangar Club (from 1942 the Assisium School, and from 2006 a private residence), 36 East 63rd Street, New York, NY, completed in 1929.
- Bank of America International, 37-41 Broad Street, New York, NY (originally Lee, Higginson & Company Bank Building)
- Bank of the Manhattan Company, Bayside, New York, completed in 1941.
- Bayberry Land (Sabin Residence), Southampton, New York, completed in 1918 (demolished in May 2004).
- Central Hanover Building, 335 Greenwich Street, New York, NY, completed in 1931.
- Manufacturers Hanover Trust Co., branch bank, 35 East 72nd Street, New York, NY, completed in 1931 (now JP Morgan Chase bank branch).
- Manufacturers Trust Building, 1 East 57th Street, New York, NY, completed in 1931 (now Louis Vuitton and much altered by the architect Jun Aoki in 2004).
- Church of Notre Dame, 40 Morningside Drive, New York, NY, completed in 1914.
- 20 Exchange Place, New York, NY, completed in 1931.
- 90 Church Street, New York, NY, completed in 1935.
- Field Mansion, Yorktown, New York,
- Franklin Towers, New York, NY, completed in 1931.
- General Electric Building, 570 Lexington Avenue, New York, NY, completed in 1931.
- Harriman Building, 35-39 Broadway, New York, NY, completed in 1928.
- The Barclay Hotel (now the InterContinental New York Barclay Hotel), 111 East 48th Street, New York, NY, completed in 1926.
- Dr. Ernest Stillman House, now The Hewitt School, 45 East 75th Street, New York, NY, completed in 1925.
- Aetna Building, 151 William Street, New York, NY, completed in 1940 with Eggers & Higgins. Now ILX Systems. (The facade has been greatly altered.)
- McCutcheon Building, 609 Fifth Avenue, New York, NY, completed in 1925. (The lower two stories have been altered.)
- The Knapp Building, 383-385 Madison Avenue, New York, NY, completed in 1923 (now demolished).
- Leigh Hall, Yale School of Music, New Haven, CT, completed in 1930.
- The Links Club, 36-38 East 62nd Street, New York, NY, completed 1917.
- Edward S. Moore Residence, Roslyn, New York, completed in 1922.
- Museum of Non-Objective Painting, 24 East 54th Street, New York, NY
- One Sutton Place South with Rosario Candela, New York, NY, completed in 1927.
- Park Building, Worcester, MA, completed in 1915.
- Guaranty Trust Company of New York offices, 4 Place de la Concorde, Paris, France, completed in 1929.
- Postum Building, 250 Park Avenue, New York, NY, completed in 1924.
- Stone & Webster Building, 90 Broad Street, New York, NY, completed in 1931.
- Tiffany & Co. flagship store, 727 Fifth Avenue, New York, NY, completed in 1940.
- Union and New Haven Trust Building (now "The Union" apartments) on the New Haven Green, New Haven, CT, completed in 1927.
- U.S. Post Office, Jamaica, Queens, completed in 1934.
- Wiley Building, 434 Park Avenue South, New York, NY, completed in 1913.
- William Sloan House, 360 West 34th Street, New York, NY, completed in 1930
- Lewis Spencer Morris House, 116-118 East 80th Street, New York, NY, completed in 1923.
- George and Martha Whitney House, 120 East 80th Street, New York, NY, completed in 1930.
- The Yorkgate, 25 East End Avenue, New York, NY, completed in 1928.
