= 834 Fifth Avenue =

Residential skyscraper in Manhattan, New York

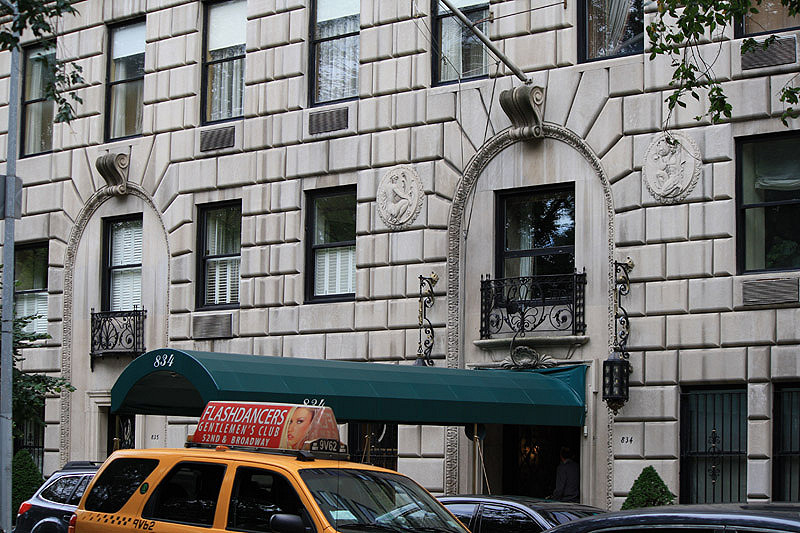
- 834 Fifth Avenue entry.

- Location within New York City
- Alternative names: 834 Fifth

General information
- Type: Co-op
- Architectural style: Art Deco
- Location: 834 Fifth Avenue, New York, NY, United States
- Coordinates: 40.7676°N 73.9703°W
- Current tenants: approx. 24-48 tenants
- Construction started: 1929
- Completed: 1931
- Cost: $20-$30 million (average selling price for an apartment)

Technical details
- Structural system: Skyscraper
- Floor count: 16 (24 apartments)

Design and construction
- Architect: Rosario Candela

834 Fifth Avenue is a luxury residential housing cooperative on the Upper East Side of Manhattan, New York City. It is located on Fifth Avenue at the corner of East 64th Street opposite the Central Park Zoo. The limestone-clad building was designed by Rosario Candela, a prolific designer of luxury apartment buildings in Manhattan during the period between World War I and World War II. 834 Fifth Avenue is widely regarded as one of the most prestigious apartment houses in New York City. It has been called "the most pedigreed building on the snobbiest street in the country’s most real estate-obsessed city" in an article in the New York Observer newspaper. This status is due to the building's overall architecture, the scale and layout of the apartments, and the notoriety of its current and past residents. It is one of the finest buildings designed by Rosario Candela, according to The New York Times.

== History ==
The building was constructed in 1931, and was one of the last luxury apartment houses completed before the Great Depression halted such projects in New York City. Its street-facing facades are composed entirely of limestone. Elements of Art Deco styling were utilized on the entry ways and portions of the Fifth Avenue facade. The building uses setbacks at the upper floors to create terraces for several apartments and provide visual interest from a distance.

The building is incorporated as a housing cooperative, where tenants own shares in the corporation which owns the building; those shares entitle the owner to occupy a designated unit in the building. Similar to other ultraluxury apartment buildings in New York City, a person who purchases a unit in the building must pay entirely in cash for the apartment. No mortgage financing is allowed. In addition, the cooperative's board is rumored to require potential buyers to possess liquid assets in excess of ten times the value of the purchased unit.

== Apartments ==
834 Fifth has 24 apartments on 16 floors. The building occupies a plot of land which is approximately 150' by 110', allowing for very spacious units. The building's apartments typically range in size from approximately 3,500 sq ft (330 m^{2}) to 7,000 sq ft (650 m^{2}) with an average unit being approximately 6,000 square feet. The largest single unit—a combination of two apartments done during the construction process—is approximately 10,000 sq ft (930 m^{2}).

The original design for 834 called for a midblock 120-foot-wide building, but it was asymmetrically extended southward during construction after a holdout corner mansion was acquired by the developer. Because this happened with the steel frame of the building's structure already in place, the extra 30 feet of frontage would be allocated as a line of duplex apartments, so that the original developer blueprints remained more or less intact. All the apartments were designed with high ceilings, and several units have outdoor space. Apartments in the building have ceiling heights of 11 to 12 feet in the public rooms, while the bedroom floors have ceiling heights of 9 to 11 feet (9 feet in the duplexes and 10 to 11 feet in the simplexes). There are three maisonette apartments, units which have entrances from the street as well as from the building's interior lobby.

The duplexes on the southern side of the building form the A Line, each unit of which is approximately 5,500 square feet. These apartments typically have a 600-square-foot living room facing Central Park, and a 450-square-foot dining room and 300-square-foot library along the 64th Street side of the building. Most of these units have four to six bedrooms on their upper floors. Unit 13-14A is 4,750 square feet (as well as approximately 350 square feet of terraces) and Unit 15A is a 2,000 square foot simplex type apartment with approximately 250 square feet of terrace space. Several of the A-Line units have annexed space from adjoining apartments resulting in units that are over 6,000 square feet. In one case, the A-line duplex unit on the 7th and 8th floors was combined with portions of two adjacent B-line units to create the largest apartment in the building, an approximately 10,000-square-foot unit.

The other apartments in the building form the B and C lines. In the original building there were two duplex maisonettes, the southern one measured roughly 6,250 square feet, while the smaller northern about 5,500 square feet. Above there were two large duplex units, about 7,000 square feet each. With the additional area available when the building was expanded to 64th Street, the developer created a total of three duplex maisonettes of 5,500, 4,500 and 6,250 square feet in total. The 6,250-square-foot maisonette was modified to enlarge the lobby.

Above these maisonettes were the other B and C lines units. On the third and fourth floors are duplex B and C units of approximately 7,000 square feet each. Floors 5, 7, 9 and 10 contain smaller B-Line simplex units. These smaller apartments have Central Park-frontage of approximately 60 feet on each floor. The rest of the building's B-line apartments have a linear expanse of 120 feet of park frontage. Floors 6, 11 and 12 have only one B-line apartment, each of which is 6,500–7,000 square feet (the higher the floor the smaller the square footage due to setbacks and terraces in rear courtyard facing side of each apartment). Floor 8 also has one B-line apartment, but it is smaller due to space annexed into duplex 7-8A. In the C-Line, Floor 5 features a smaller simplex unit, 5C, and Floors 9 and 10 feature a larger duplex unit, 9-10C, with a similar footprint to the C-line duplex on the third and fourth floors.

Unit 13B was originally laid out as a four-bedroom duplex, but its upper level, which contained 2 bedrooms, was annexed to become part of the original penthouse (bought by Hugh Baker for $275,000 in 1930). Unit 13B is now a smaller 5,000 square feet two-bedroom simplex unit (including several Park and north-facing terraces).

Finally, at the top of the building, the triplex penthouse is 8,000 square feet, with private rooms on the 14th floor, public rooms on the 15th floor, and a sun room/library on the top level of the unit. The penthouse also features an additional 4,000 square feet of outdoor space (terraces, patios). It was expanded by Wallace K. Harrison for Laurance Rockefeller.

There is also a 1,000-square-foot superintendent's apartment on the ground floor at the rear of the lobby.

== Residents ==
834 Fifth Avenue has historically been home to a large number of founders and heirs of major American family fortunes. The fortunes include those associated with Standard Oil, Johnson & Johnson, Woolworth Stores, the Hearst Corporation, Ford Motor Company and the Chase Manhattan Bank. The building has long been associated with the Rockefeller family and its various business and charitable interests.

In addition, 834 Fifth Avenue has welcomed a higher percentage of entrepreneurs and self-made business people than its peer buildings. Firms founded by tenants of 834 Fifth include Charles Schwab, TLC Beatrice, the Limited and Fox.

When Charlie Chaplin was in New York City during his contract negotiations with Mutual Film, and found out that his first love, Hetty Kelly, was staying with her sister, Mrs. Ethel Margaret Kelly Gould (wife of Frank Jay Gould), at 834 Fifth Avenue, he stalked the place. Note that this building was not the current structure, but one that was demolished at this site. Other previous structures at this site were 1 East 64th Street (Mr. George Crocker) and 833 Fifth Avenue (Mr. William Guggenheim).

Past and current residents include:

- Antenor Patiño, Bolivian tycoon, heir to his father Simón I. Patiño, called "the King of Tin" (the first sale of a Manhattan apartment for more than $1 million in 1978). He resided in a 15-room apartment sold by Mrs. Flagler Matthews by the broker Evalyn M. Kaiser
- Laurance Rockefeller (who owned the building before it became a cooperative, and resided in the penthouse triplex for nearly fifty years)
- Rupert Murdoch (founder of the Fox Network, BSkyB)
- Robert Bass (billionaire investor)
- John Stanislaw Radziwill, son of Stanisław Albrecht Radziwiłł
- Len Blavatnik (billionaire businessman)
- Loida Nicolas-Lewis (business woman, philanthropist, widow of Reginald Lewis)
- Les Wexner (founder, L Brands)
- John Gutfreund (chairman of Salomon Brothers) and wife Susan
- Damon Mezzacappa (financier, former vice chairman of Lazard Freres)
- Elizabeth Arden (founder of the eponymous cosmetics company)
- Harold Prince (Broadway producer)
- Carroll Petrie (a philanthropist, widow of Milton Petrie, founder of Petrie Stores)
- A. Alfred Taubman (shopping mall developer, former chairman of Sotheby's)
- John DeLorean (former automotive magnate)
- Joan Whitney Payson (an heiress, and philanthropist)
- Robert (Woody) Johnson IV (one of the heirs of the Johnson & Johnson fortune, owner of the New York Jets)
- Charles R. Schwab (founder and CEO of the Charles Schwab Corporation)
- Frank Jay Gould
- Casey Johnson (an heiress to the Johnson & Johnson fortune, well-known socialite celebutante and daughter of Jets owner Woody Johnson)
- Jessie Donahue (daughter of five and dime king FW Woolworth and mother of James Paul Donahue Jr.)
- Jean Flagler Matthews (granddaughter and heiress of oil and railroad magnate and founder of Palm Beach, Henry Morrison Flagler and daughter of Harry Harkness Flagler)
- Hamilton E. James (billionaire, bought Hal Prince's apartment)
