= 740 Park Avenue =

Apartment building in Manhattan, New York

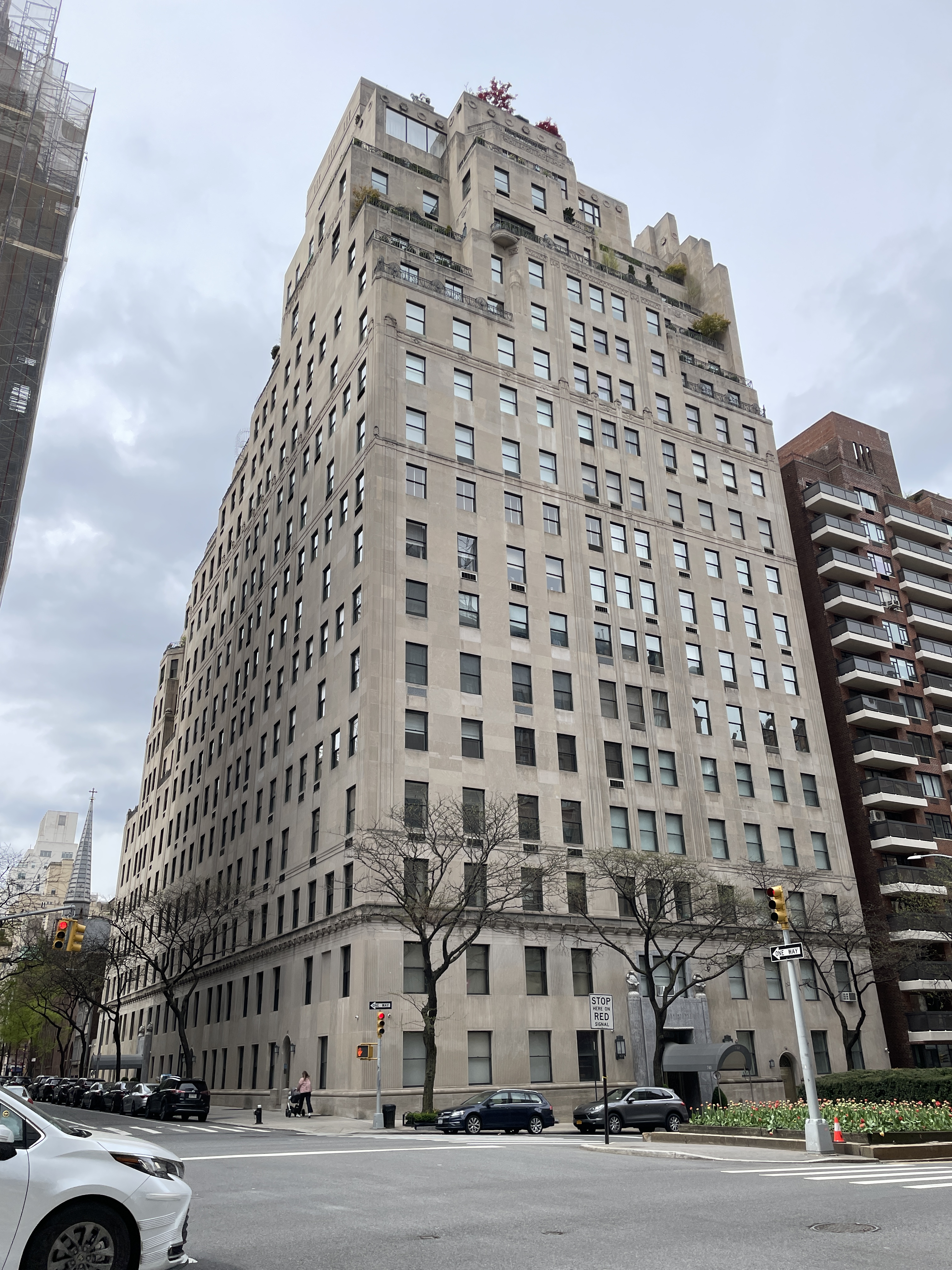
- 740 Park in 2024
- Interactive map of the 740 Park Avenue area

General information
- Type: Housing cooperative
- Architectural style: Art Deco
- Location: 740 Park Avenue
- Coordinates: 40°46′15″N 73°57′53″W
- Construction started: 1929
- Opened: 1930

Height
- Height: 78.03 m (256.0 ft)

Technical details
- Floor count: 19

Design and construction
- Architects: Rosario Candela and Arthur Loomis Harmon

740 Park Avenue is a luxury cooperative apartment building on the west side of Park Avenue between East 71st and 72nd Streets in the Lenox Hill section of the Upper East Side of Manhattan, New York City, New York. It was described in Business Insider in 2011 as "a legendary address" that was "at one time considered (and still thought to be by some) the most luxurious and powerful residential building in New York City". The "pre-war" building's side entrance address is 71 East 71st Street.

The 19-story building was designed in an Art Deco architectural style and consists of 31 units, including duplexes and triplexes. The architectural height of the building is 256.0 feet (78.0 m).

== History ==
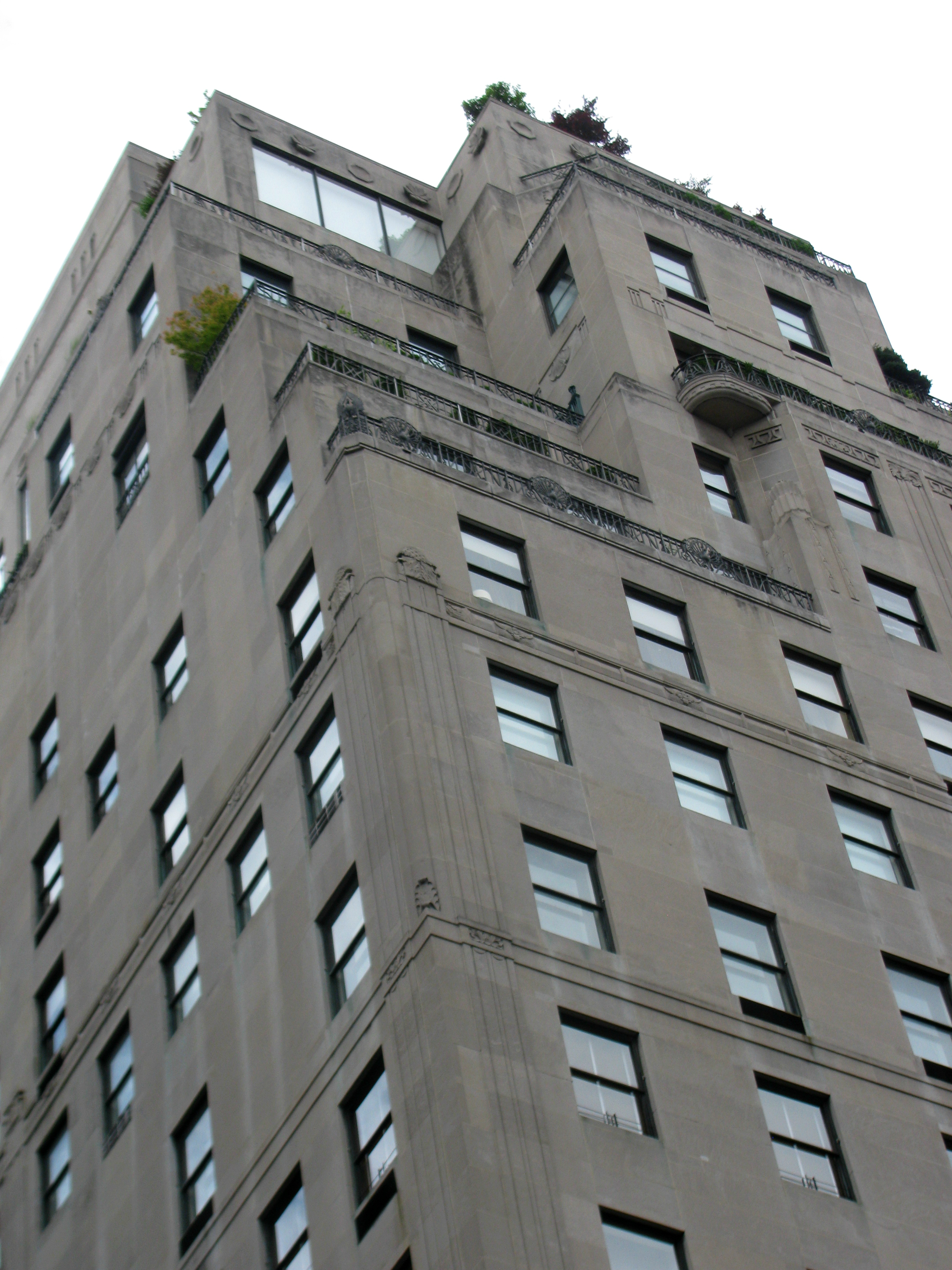
The three-storey penthouse at 740 Park Avenue

The building was constructed in 1929 by James T. Lee, the grandfather of First Lady Jacqueline Lee Kennedy Onassis – who lived there as a child as Jacqueline Bouvier – and was designed by Rosario Candela and Arthur Loomis Harmon; Harmon became a partner of the newly named Shreve, Lamb and Harmon during the year of construction. The building was officially opened in October 1930, a year after the Great Depression began, and the poor timing was devastating. Even though the New York elite had moved in, the building had failed financially by 1933. It remained in the red for 50 years. It was not until the 1980s that the building's apartments sold for incredibly high prices.

In 1937, one of the first well-known residents was John D. Rockefeller Jr., who moved into 15/16B, a duplex that many still consider New York's crown jewel apartment. According to New York City real estate lore, "whoever inherits the biggest penthouse at 740 inherits the throne of New York society itself." In 1971, Saul Steinberg bought that triplex for $285,000 (equivalent to $2,266,000 in 2025) and after two divorces sold it to Stephen Schwarzman for "slightly above or below $30 million" in 2000. This was the highest price ever paid on Park Avenue until May 2012, when Howard Marks paid $52.5 million for two adjoining two-story duplexes (totaling 30 rooms), which set a short-lived record as the highest price ever paid for a co-op apartment.

In 1979, the French government purchased an 18-room duplex for $600,000 to be used as their United Nations ambassador's residence. The French government's duplex unit was sold in June 2014 for $70 million, reportedly $22 million over the asking price – a bidding war involving three prospective buyers escalated the eventual selling price. The buyer was hedge fund billionaire Israel Englander, who already lived in the unit directly above, and surpassed a record set just days earlier by Egypt's richest man, Nassef Sawiris, for a penthouse unit on nearby Fifth Avenue.

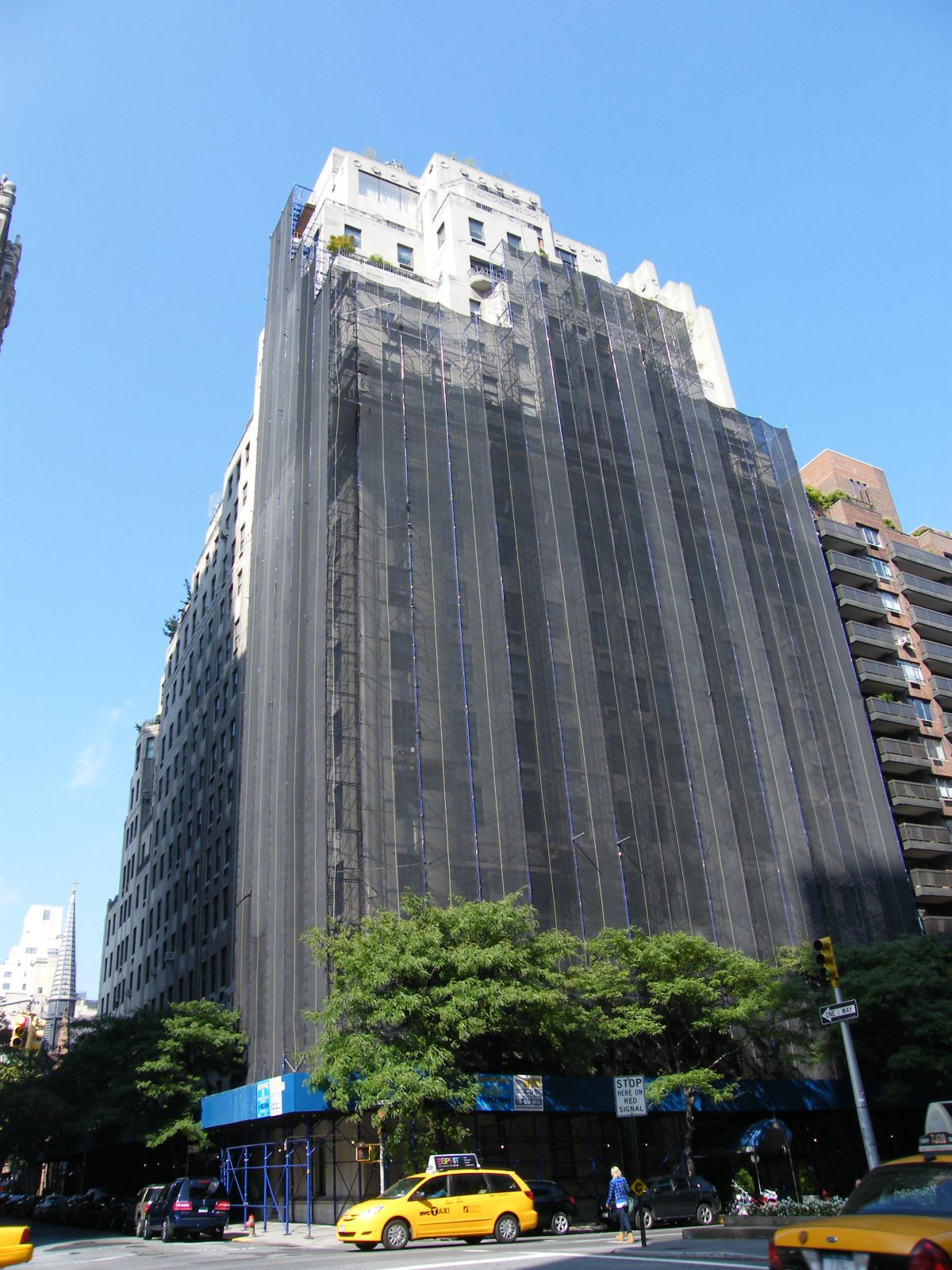
Undergoing renovation in 2008

In 2005, author Michael Gross published a detailed book on the building and its history, 740 Park: The Story of the World's Richest Apartment Building. According to Gross, builder Lee's daughter, Janet Lee Bouvier, and son-in-law Jack Bouvier, attained the final open lease; according to one account, they did not pay for the lease. Hedge fund manager David Ganek paid $19 million for the childhood duplex home of Jacqueline Kennedy Onassis in 2005.

The residents of 740 Park were heavily affected by the 2008 financial crisis, as many of the residents are hedge fund billionaires as opposed to the titans of industry like Rockefeller who moved in during the 1930s. The building was once home to one of the world's largest private collections of Mark Rothko works. The former owner—alleged Bernie Madoff middleman and ex-financier J. Ezra Merkin—still lives there, but the paintings were sold during the Madoff scandal.

Hedge fund billionaire Charles Stevenson paid $9 million for an apartment in the building and was the head of the 740 Park Avenue cooperative in December 2011.

In 2012, the Alex Gibney documentary Park Avenue: Money, Power and the American Dream, based on the Michael Gross book, aired on the "Independent Lens" series of the PBS TV network. The film details that the building was home to the highest concentration of billionaires in the United States.

== Notable residents ==
- Rand Araskog – former CEO of ITT Corporation
- Israel Englander - hedge fund manager, founder of Millennium Management purchased apartment 12/13D for $71.3 million in 2014 from the French Republic, which used it as its Consul’s residence
- Thelma Chrysler Foy – heiress to the Chrysler fortune
- Woody Johnson – heir to the Johnson & Johnson fortune, owner of the New York Jets and U.S. Ambassador to the United Kingdom.
- David H. Koch and Julia Koch – businesspeople, co-owner and board member of Koch Industries, occupied an 18-room duplex on the fourth and fifth floors said to have been purchased in 2004 for $17 million
- Jerzy Kosinski – novelist
- Howard Marks – chairman of Oaktree Capital Management
- J. Ezra Merkin – hedge fund manager, son of late businessman Hermann Merkin
- Steven Mnuchin – investment banker, film producer, and former Secretary of the Treasury of the United States
- Jacqueline Kennedy Onassis – childhood home
- Ronald Perelman – businessman
- John D. Rockefeller Jr. – businessman and philanthropist, lived from 1937 to 1960 in a 24-room, 12-bath duplex.
- Steve Ross – late CEO of Time Warner
- Julio Mario Santo Domingo – Colombian businessman lived in the building from the 1980s until his death in 2011
- Stephen A. Schwarzman – CEO of the Blackstone Group; bought the former Rockefeller apartment for just over $35 million
- Jonathan Sobel – former partner at Goldman Sachs, director of Hilltop Holdings Inc., and business associate of billionaire Gerald J. Ford
- Saul Steinberg – financier; owned the Rockefeller apartment until selling to Schwarzman.
- Allene Tew – American socialite in the Gilded Age. Occupied two different units in the building.
- John Thain – CEO of CIT Group, last chairman and CEO of Merrill Lynch
- Electra Havemeyer Webb - she and her husband James Watson Webb II, had a penthouse there from 1932 to 1960. On the grounds of Shelburne Museum, which she founded, is the Electra Havemeyer Webb Memorial, which has an installation of 6 rooms from her penthouse at 740 Park Avenue.

Applicants who have sought to purchase units in the building but have been refused include Barbra Streisand, Neil Sedaka and Russian billionaire Leonard Blavatnik.
