= 57th Street station (IND Sixth Avenue Line) =

New York City Subway station in Manhattan

57 Street
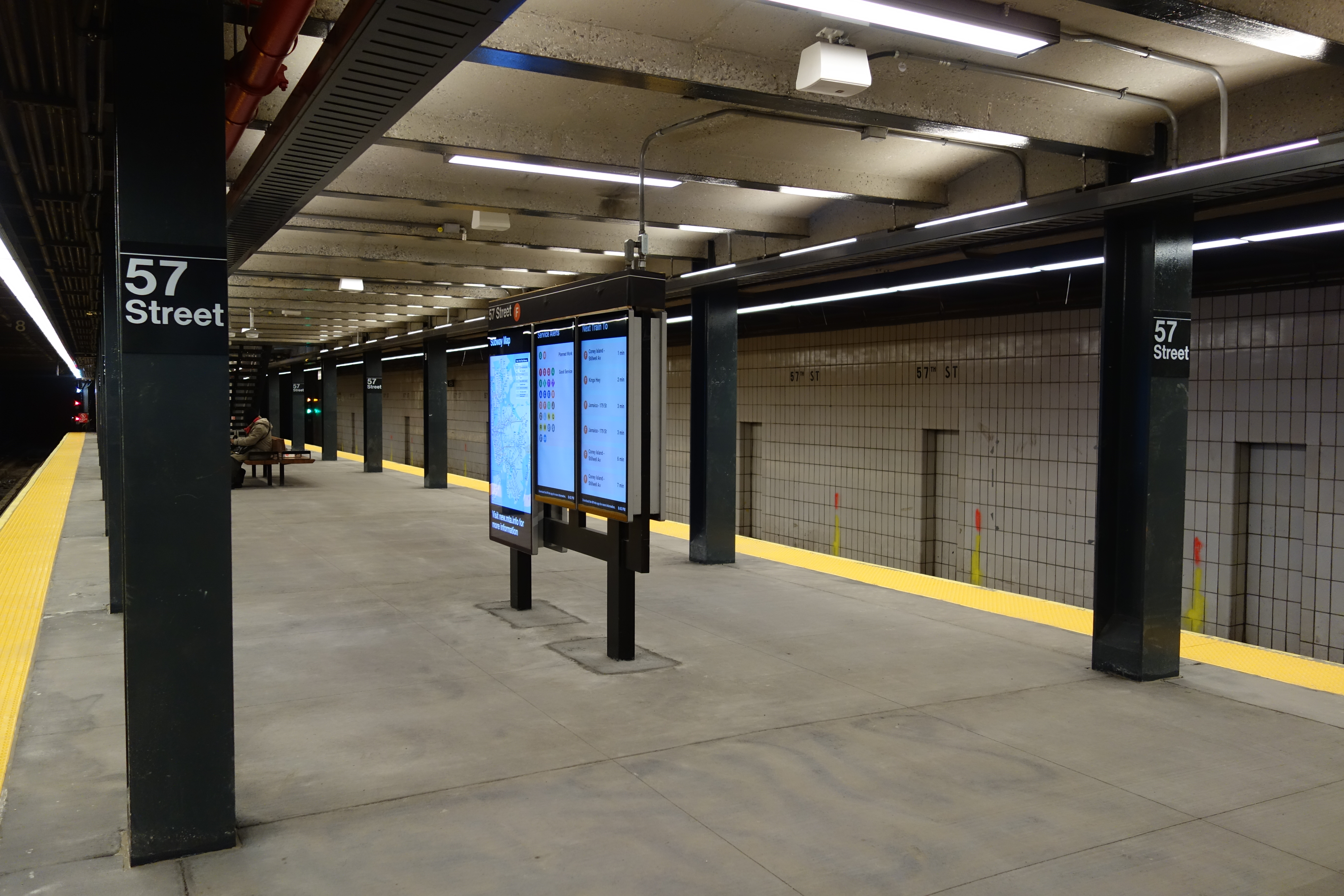
- The 57th Street station in December 2018.

Station statistics
- Address: West 57th Street & Sixth Avenue; New York, New York
- Borough: Manhattan
- Locale: Midtown Manhattan
- Coordinates: 40.764259°N 73.977213°W
- Division: B (IND)
- Line: IND Sixth Avenue Line
- Services: F (late nights and weekends); M (weekdays during the day)
- Transit: NYCT Bus: M5, M7, M31, M57, SIM1C, SIM3, SIM3C, SIM4C, SIM10, SIM30, SIM33C; MTA Bus: QM10, QM12, QM15, QM16, QM17, QM18, QM24
- Structure: Underground
- Platforms: 1 island platform
- Tracks: 2

Other information
- Opened: July 1, 1968; 58 years ago
- Closed: July 9, 2018; 8 years ago (reconstruction)
- Rebuilt: December 19, 2018; 7 years ago
- Accessible: Yes

Traffic
- 2025: 3,816,096 ▲31.5%
- Rank: 94 out of 423
Services
Preceding station	New York City Subway	Following station
Lexington Avenue–63rd Street F M toward Forest Hills–71st Avenue	Local	47th–50th Streets–Rockefeller Center F M toward Middle Village–Metropolitan Avenue
Former services
Preceding station	New York City Subway	Following station
Lexington Avenue toward 21st Street–Queensbridge	JFK Express	47th–50th Streets–Rockefeller Center toward Howard Beach–JFK Airport
Location
Location within New York City Subway
Location within New York City
Location within New York
Track layout
Street map
Station service legend
Symbol	Description
Stops all times	Stops all times
Stops weekdays during the day	Stops weekdays during the day
Stops late nights and weekends	Stops late nights and weekends
Stops rush hours in the peak direction only (limited service)	Stops rush hours in the peak direction only (limited service)

The 57th Street station is a station on the IND Sixth Avenue Line of the New York City Subway. Located at the intersection of 57th Street and Sixth Avenue (Avenue of the Americas) in Manhattan, it is served by the M train on weekdays during the day and the F train during weekends and nights. North of the station, the Sixth Avenue Line turns east and becomes the IND 63rd Street Line.

First announced in 1962, the 57th Street station was opened on July 1, 1968, at the cost of $13.2 million. The station was a terminal station until 1989, after which all service was extended to 21st Street–Queensbridge. The station was temporarily served by shuttle trains in the 1990s during the 63rd Street Line's reconstruction. From July to December 2018, the station was closed for an extensive five-month renovation.

== History ==
=== Construction and 20th century ===
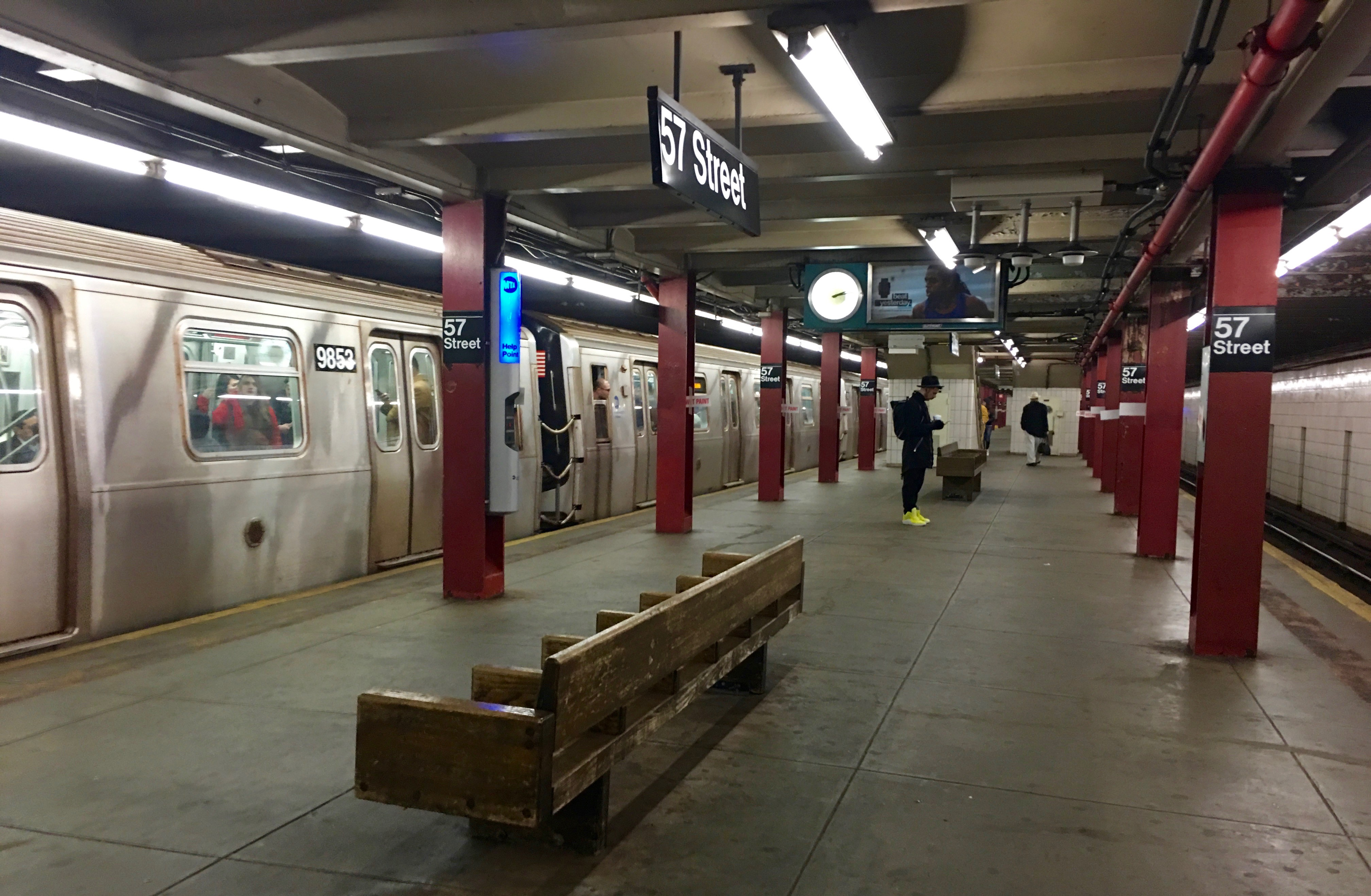
The station in 2016, prior to renovations

The station was built as part of the Chrystie Street Connection, which expanded train capacity on the Sixth Avenue Line. The Sixth Avenue extension to the new terminal at 57th Street was announced in 1962. The next year, the contract to construct the IND Sixth Avenue Line between 52nd and 58th Streets, including the 57th Street station, was awarded to Slattery Construction Company for $7.5 million (equivalent to $79,800,000 in 2025). Construction of the spur ultimately cost $13.2 million (equivalent to $122,210,526 in 2025).

The 57th Street station opened on July 1, 1968, as one of two stations added during construction of the Chrystie Street Connection, the other being Grand Street. The opening of the station was celebrated by a 300-guest lunch on the platform on June 27, which was attended by Deputy Mayor Robert W. Sweet; MTA Chairman William J. Ronan; and Avenue of the Americas Association president Eyssell. The new station was intended to serve the new residential and commercial developments being built in the immediate area. Upon its opening, the 57th Street station acted as the terminus of two services, the B during rush hours and KK during off-peak hours. The KK was renamed the K in 1974 and eliminated in 1976. From 1978 to 1990, this station was also served by the JFK Express service to the eponymous airport.

When the north side of the Manhattan Bridge was closed for construction from 1986 to 1998 and again from July to December 2001, this station was only served by a shuttle train along Sixth Avenue, which traveled to Grand Street. Starting in 1988, this station was served by Q trains on weekdays, B trains on weekday evenings and weekends, and F trains during late nights. This was the terminal for all services until the IND 63rd Street Line to 21st Street–Queensbridge opened on October 29, 1989. Late night F train service was replaced by a shuttle in 1997. Beginning in December 2001, when the 63rd Street Tunnel Connector opened in Queens, the F was rerouted to serve this station at all times, simultaneous with the withdrawal of all other services from the 63rd Street Line.

=== Renovation and service changes ===
Under the 2015–2019 MTA Capital Plan, the station underwent a complete overhaul as part of the Enhanced Station Initiative and was entirely closed for several months. Updates included cellular service, Wi-Fi, USB charging stations, interactive service advisories and maps. In January 2018, the NYCT and Bus Committee recommended that Judlau Contracting receive the $125 million (equivalent to $160,267,029 in 2025) contract for the renovations of 57th and 23rd Streets on the IND Sixth Avenue Line; 28th Street on the IRT Lexington Avenue Line, and 34th Street–Penn Station on the IRT Broadway–Seventh Avenue Line and IND Eighth Avenue Line. However, the MTA Board temporarily deferred the vote for these packages after city representatives refused to vote to award the contracts. The contract was put back for a vote in February, where Judlau's contract was ultimately approved. The station was closed for renovations on July 9, 2018, and reopened on December 19, 2018.

In June 2021, Turkish developer Sedesco released plans for a 1,100-foot-tall (340 m) supertall skyscraper at 41-47 West 57th Street, within the nearby Billionaires' Row. The developer funded and constructed two elevators—one between the street and the mezzanine, and one between the mezzanine and the platform—at the 57th Street station to make it compliant with the Americans with Disabilities Act of 1990. In exchange, Sedesco received additional floor area for its skyscraper as part of the MTA's Zoning for Accessibility program. The plans were confirmed in December 2021, and construction began shortly afterward. The elevators opened in June 2026.

From August 28, 2023, through April 1, 2024, F trains were rerouted via the 53rd Street Tunnel between Queens and Manhattan due to track replacement and other repairs in the 63rd Street Tunnel. The M train was rerouted from the 53rd Street Tunnel, running to a temporary northern terminus at 57th Street. In 2023, a short barrier was installed at the center of the platforms to reduce the probability of passengers being pushed into the tracks. On December 8, 2025, the M train began serving the station on weekdays during the day, running via the 63rd Street Tunnel. The F train began running via the 53rd Street Tunnel during the day, operating via the 63rd Street Tunnel during weekends and nights.

== Station layout ==
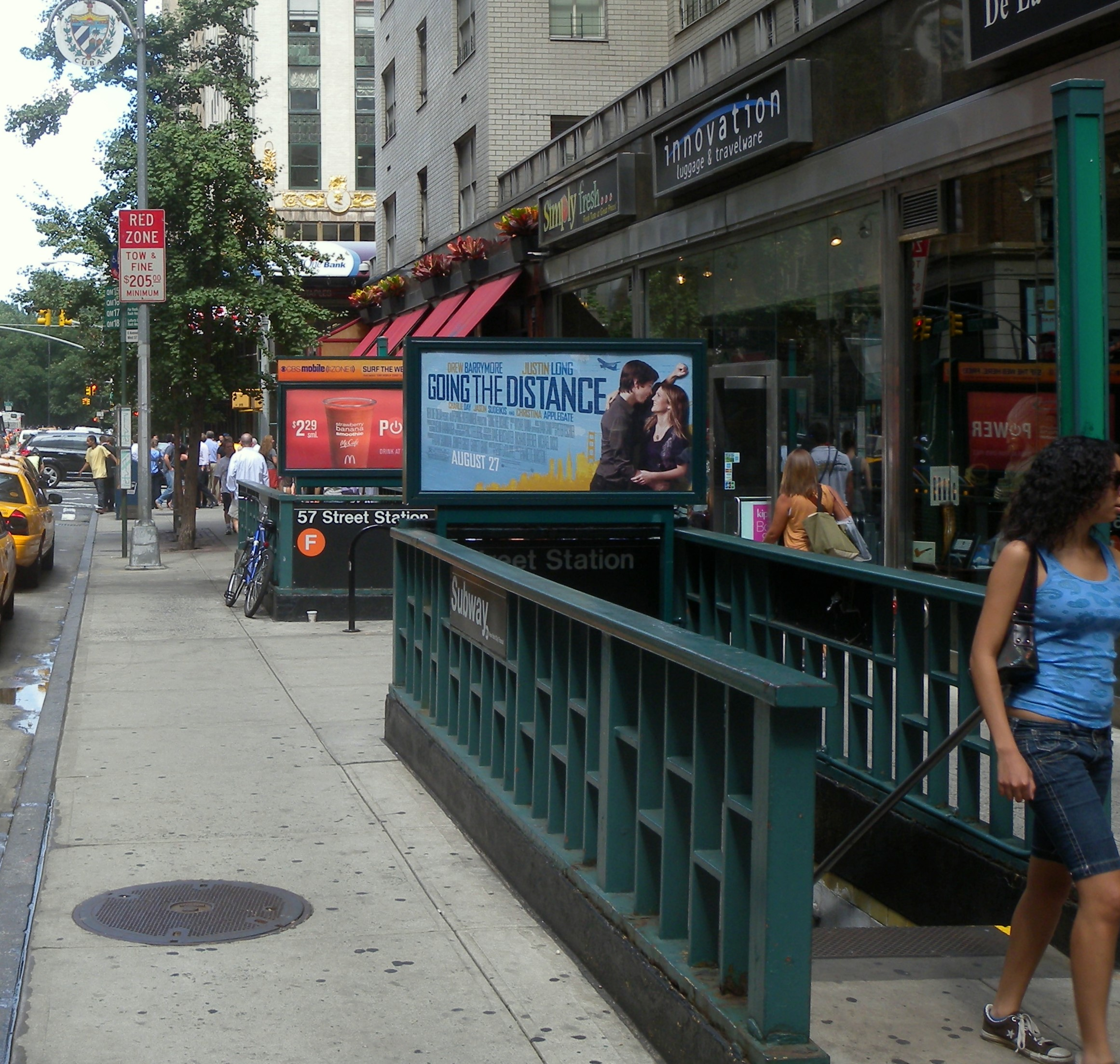
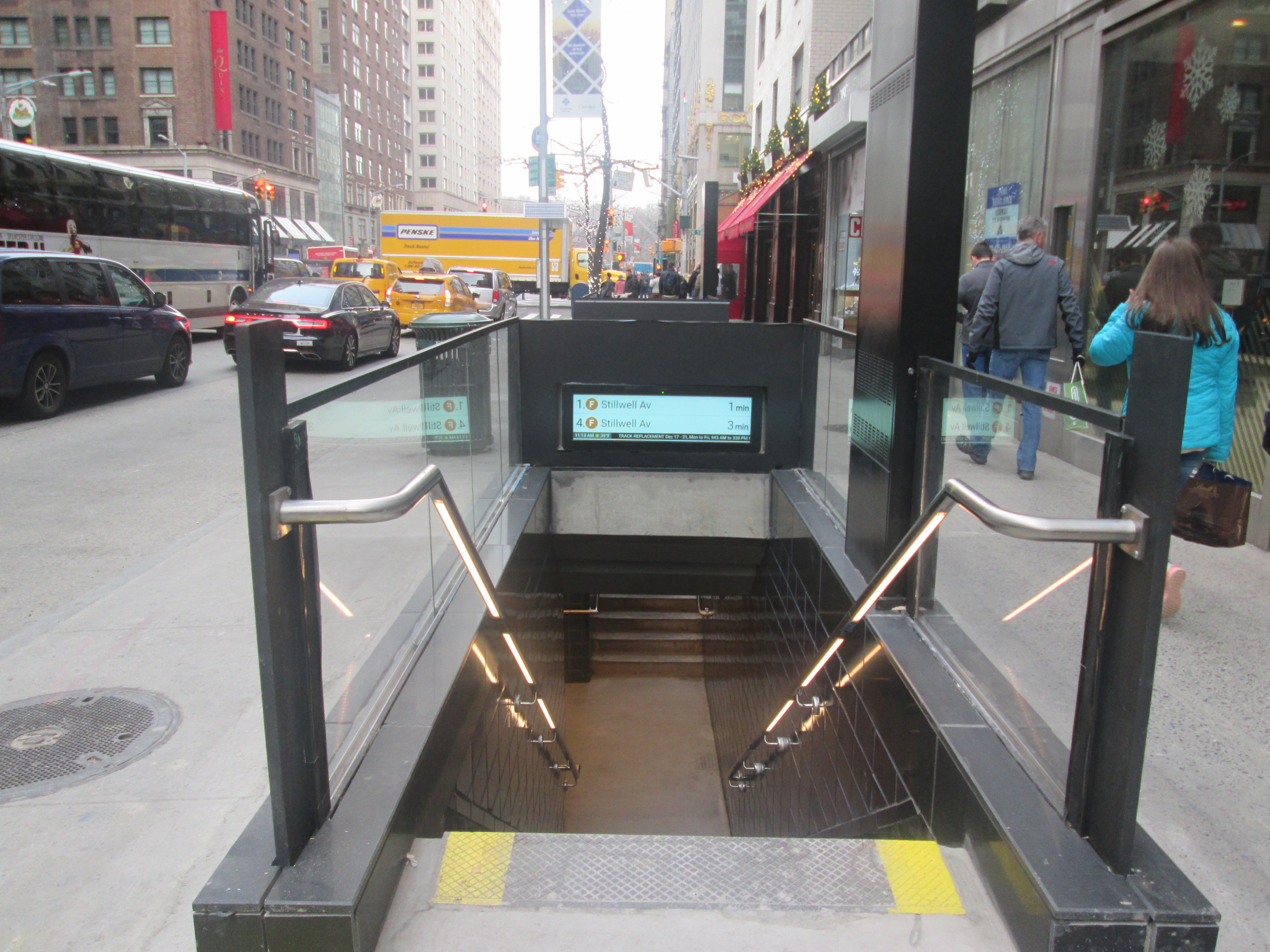
Street entrances before renovation (left) and afterward (right)

This underground station contains two tracks and a single island platform serving both tracks. The M train serves the station on weekdays during the day, while the F train serves the station during weekends and nights. The next station to the north is Lexington Avenue–63rd Street, while the next station to the south is 47th–50th Streets–Rockefeller Center.

The platform is 615 feet (187 m) long and 24 feet (7.3 m) wide. The station stretches from 55th Street to 58th Street. From the full-length mezzanine, which is 48 feet (15 m) wide, there are six staircases to the platform. The station walls are plain white, with "57th St" stenciled on long, narrow tiles along the wall. The platform is approximately 35 feet (11 m) below ground. Prior to the 2018 renovation of the station, the "Next Train" indicator lights still hung from the platform ceiling, dating from the period when the station was a terminal two decades prior. There is an unused tower and crew area at the southern end of the platform.

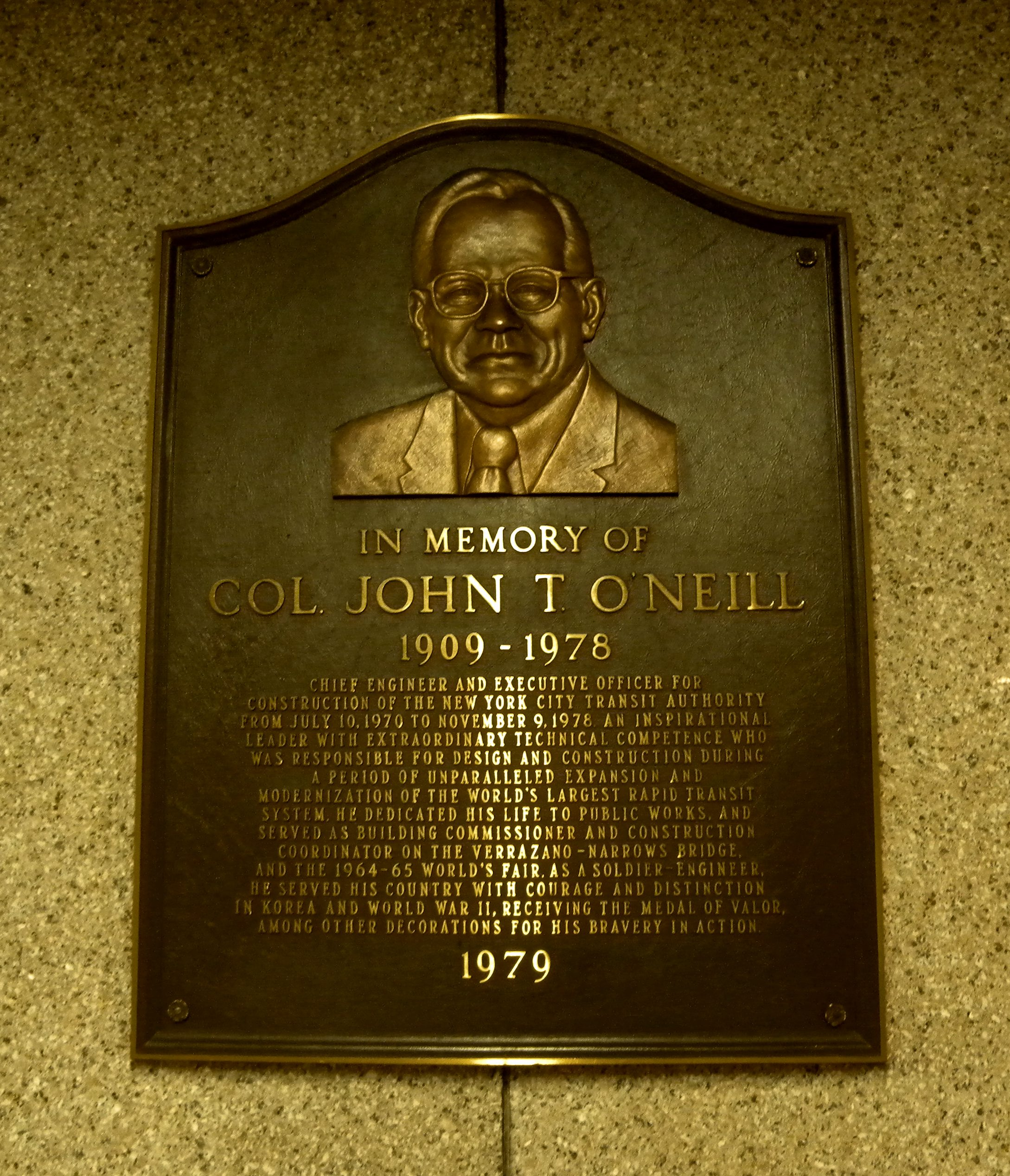
A plaque of Colonel John T. O'Neill is located in the station

The station contains a bronze plaque of Colonel John T. O'Neill, a former chief engineer of the New York City Transit Authority.

=== Exits ===
There are eight street staircases spread on both sides of Sixth Avenue from 56th to 57th Streets. Before the station's renovation, these entrances had an unusual design compared to older stations, with lit posts reading "SUBWAY" on their side rather than the lighted red-or-green globes typical to other station entrances. The station has staircases to the western corners and northeastern corners of 6th Avenue and 57th Street, two stairs to the east side of 6th Avenue between 56th and 57th Streets, and stairs to the western corners and southeastern corner of 6th Avenue and 56th Street. The elevator between the street and the mezzanine is located on the southwestern corner of 56th Street and Sixth Avenue.

During the 57th Street station's renovation, glass barrier fences, next-train arrival "countdown clocks", and digital neighborhood wayfinding maps were installed around all of the exit stairs at street level, similar to at other stations renovated as part of the Enhanced Station Initiative. The two exits at the southern corner of 56th Street also received canopies similar to other Enhanced Station Initiative stations.

== Notable places nearby ==
The 57th Street station is within one block of numerous notable locations. Attractions to the west include:

- 111 West 57th Street
- 130 and 140 West 57th Street studio buildings
- 165 West 57th Street
- 1345 Avenue of the Americas
- Carnegie Hall
- Carnegie Hall Tower
- CitySpire
- Metropolitan Tower
- New York City Center
- One57
- Parker New York and The Quin hotels
- Russian Tea Room

Attractions to the east include:

- 712 Fifth Avenue
- Bergdorf Goodman Building
- Fifth Avenue Presbyterian Church
- Houses at 10, 12, 17, 26, and 30 West 56th Street; 46 West 55th Street
- Peninsula Hotel
- Rockefeller Apartments
- Solow Building

In addition, the New York Hilton Midtown is one block south, and the Trump Parc and Hotel St. Moritz are one block north.
