= Carnegie Hall Tower =

Skyscraper in Manhattan, New York

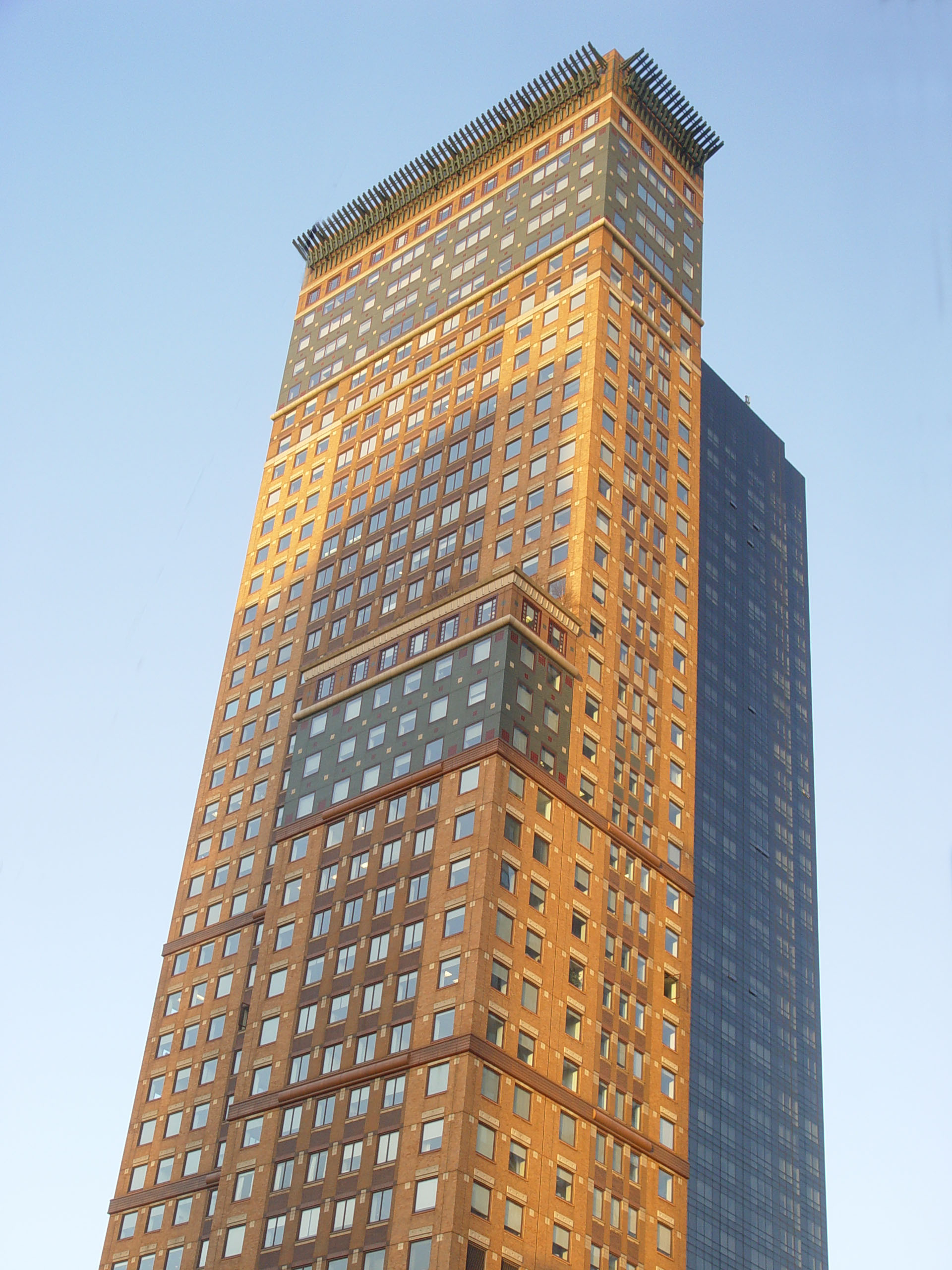

General information
- Location: 152 West 57th Street; Manhattan, New York
- Coordinates: 40°45′53″N 73°58′47″W
- Construction started: 1988
- Completed: 1991
- Owner: TF Cornerstone

Height
- Roof: 757 ft (231 m)

Technical details
- Floor count: 60

Design and construction
- Architect: César Pelli
- Structural engineer: Rosenwasser/Grossman; Cosentini Associates

Carnegie Hall Tower is a skyscraper at 152 West 57th Street in the Midtown Manhattan neighborhood of New York City. Completed in 1990 and designed by César Pelli, the building measures 757 feet (231 m) tall with 60 stories. Due to the presence of Carnegie Hall and the Russian Tea Room on adjacent sites, the tower is only 50 feet (15 m) wide on 57th Street, making it among the world's most slender skyscrapers at its completion.

Carnegie Hall Tower is designed with a red-and-orange brick facade and cast-concrete decorations, both inspired by the older structure. The tower rises above a six-story base, which contains a setback from 57th Street. The structure has an L-shaped plan through the 42nd floor and a rectangular plan above that story. The superstructure is made of concrete, with a core made of two connected concrete tubes. The building was designed with 485,000 square feet (45,100 m^{2}) for offices and 25,000 square feet (2,300 m^{2}) for Carnegie Hall's offstage facilities. Each of the upper floors contains between 8,000 and 14,000 square feet (740 and 1,300 m^{2}). The design was largely praised by architectural critics upon its completion.

The site of Carnegie Hall Tower was occupied by the Rembrandt Apartments until 1963, after which it served as a parking lot. In late 1980, the corporation and the New York City government signed a memorandum of understanding, which allowed the potential development of a skyscraper on the lot. Following a failed proposal to combine the lot with another site to the east, Rockrose Development Corporation was selected as the developer in May 1985. Construction began in late 1987 after approvals from various city agencies. After the building opened, the upper floors were marketed to small tenants, and the tower had some of New York City's most expensive office space by the 21st century.

== Site ==
Carnegie Hall Tower is at 152 West 57th Street, between Sixth Avenue and Seventh Avenue two blocks south of Central Park, in the Midtown Manhattan neighborhood of New York City. The building's land lot covers 12,552 square feet (1,166.1 m^{2}), has a frontage of 50 feet (15 m) along 57th Street, and is 200 feet (61 m) deep. The rear of the building, on 56th Street, is 75 feet (23 m) deep.

The building abuts Carnegie Hall to the west and the Russian Tea Room to the east. Other nearby buildings include Metropolitan Tower, 140 West 57th Street, and 130 West 57th Street to the east; The Briarcliffe to the northwest; the Louis H. Chalif Normal School of Dancing and One57 to the north; the Nippon Club Tower and Calvary Baptist Church to the northeast; and CitySpire and New York City Center to the south. Metropolitan Tower and Carnegie Hall Tower are only separated by the Russian Tea Room, which is 20 feet (6.1 m) wide. When both buildings were developed in the 1980s, the Russian Tea Room's owner Faith Stewart-Gordon had refused to sell her land. While Carnegie Hall Tower originally had a direct northward view of Central Park, much of the view was blocked when One57 was built in the 2010s.

The neighborhood was historically part of a former artistic hub around a two-block section of West 57th Street between Sixth Avenue and Broadway. The hub had been developed during the late 19th and early 20th centuries, following the opening of Carnegie Hall. Several buildings in the area were constructed as residences for artists and musicians, such as 130 and 140 West 57th Street, the Rodin Studios, and the Osborne Apartments, as well as the demolished Sherwood Studios and Rembrandt. In addition, the area contained the headquarters of organizations such as the American Fine Arts Society, the Lotos Club, and the American Society of Civil Engineers. By the 21st century, the artistic hub had largely been replaced with Billionaires' Row, a series of luxury skyscrapers around the southern end of Central Park. The Rembrandt Apartments, built in 1881 and demolished in 1963, had occupied the site of Carnegie Hall Tower.

== Architecture ==
Carnegie Hall Tower was designed by César Pelli and developed by the Rockrose Development Corporation. Brennan Beer Gorman was the architect of record. The tower was built by construction manager HRH Construction. In addition, Robert Rosenwasser Associates was the structural engineer, Cosentini Associates was the mechanical, electrical, and plumbing, and Mesh & Juul Inc. was the lighting engineer. Carnegie Hall Tower is 757 feet (231 m) tall and 60 stories high. As planned, it was 756 feet (230 m) tall with 59 stories.

=== Form and facade ===
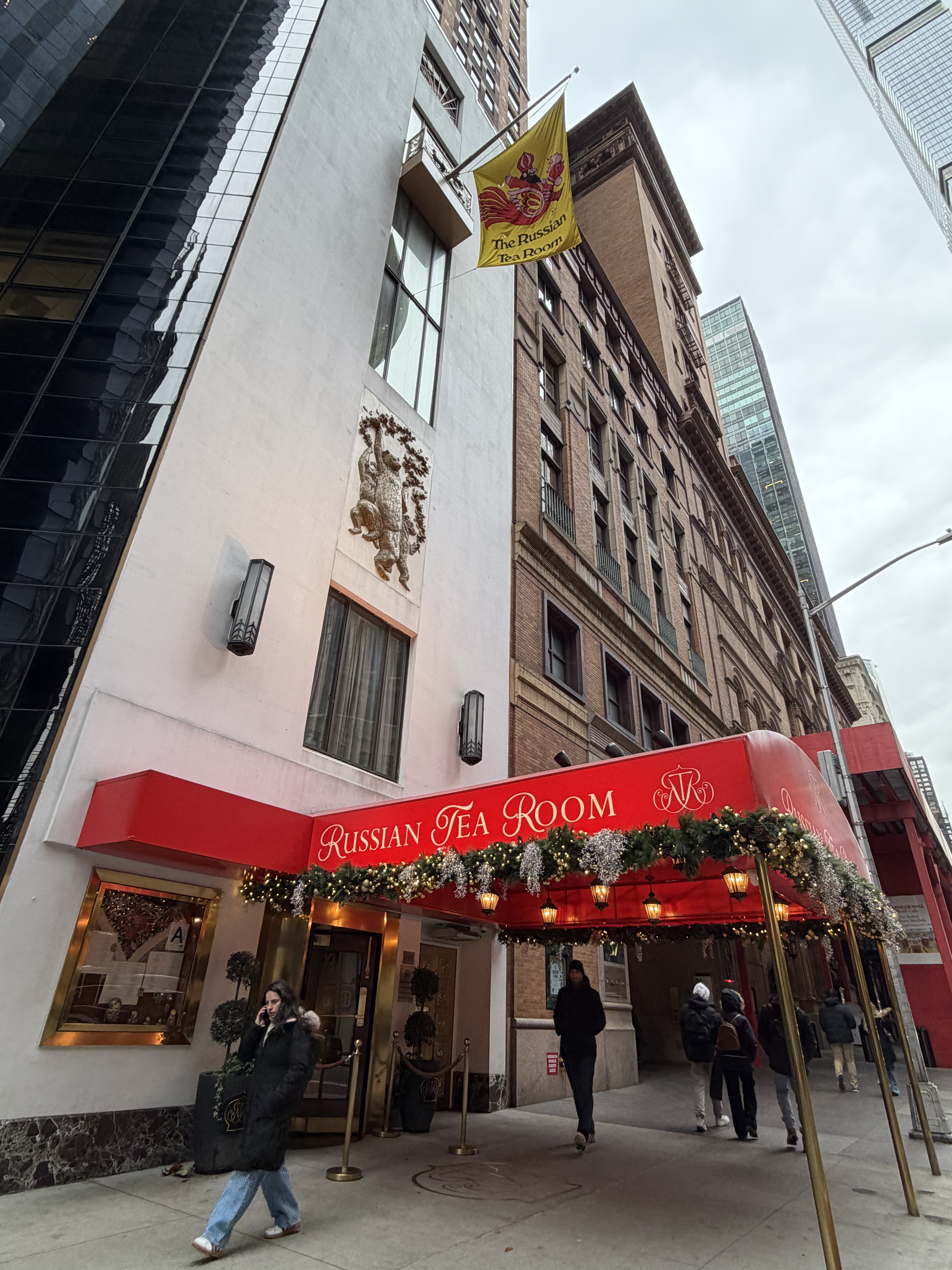
The Russian Tea Room, at 150 West 57th Street, separates Carnegie Hall Tower and Metropolitan Tower

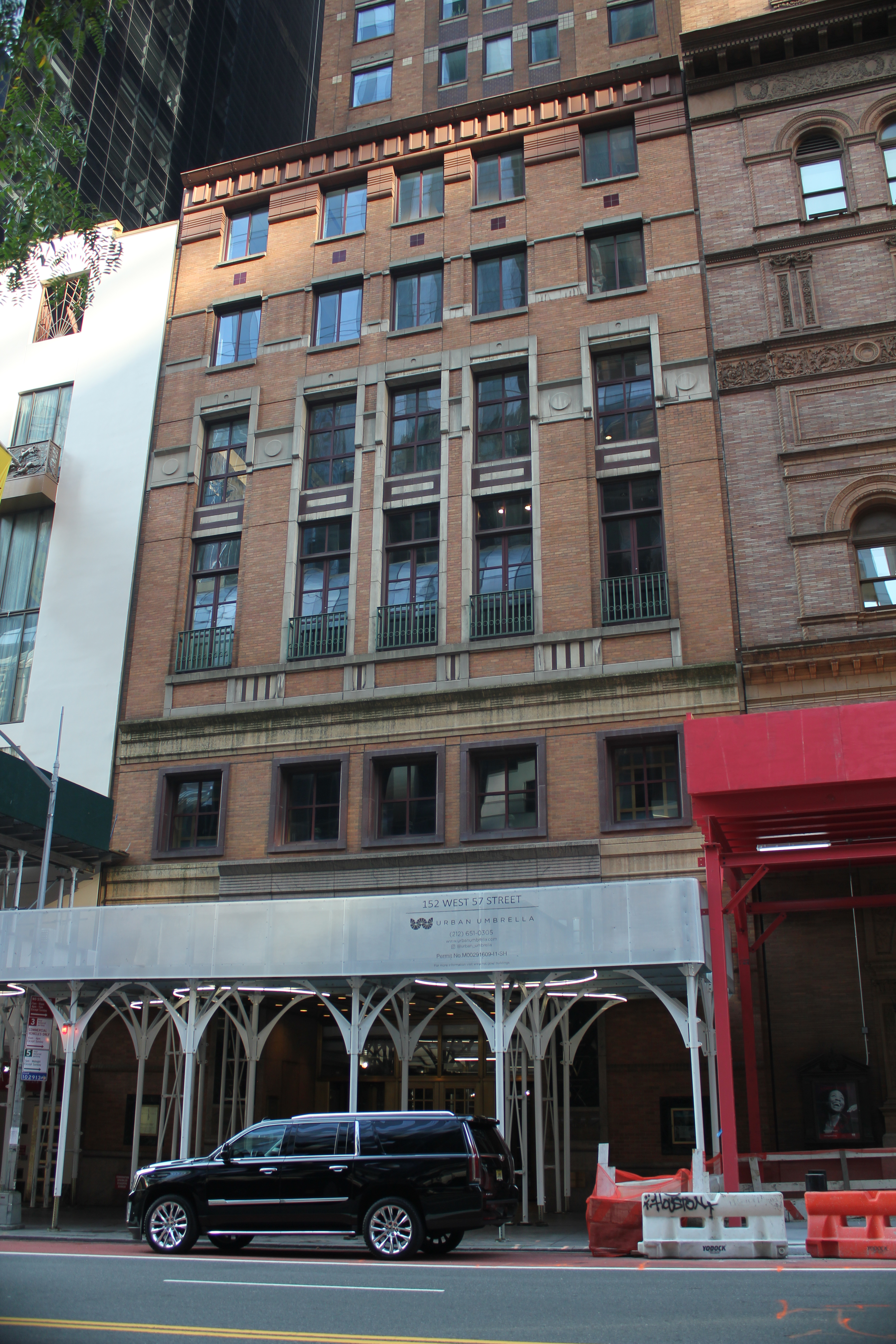
Facade of the lowest stories on 57th Street

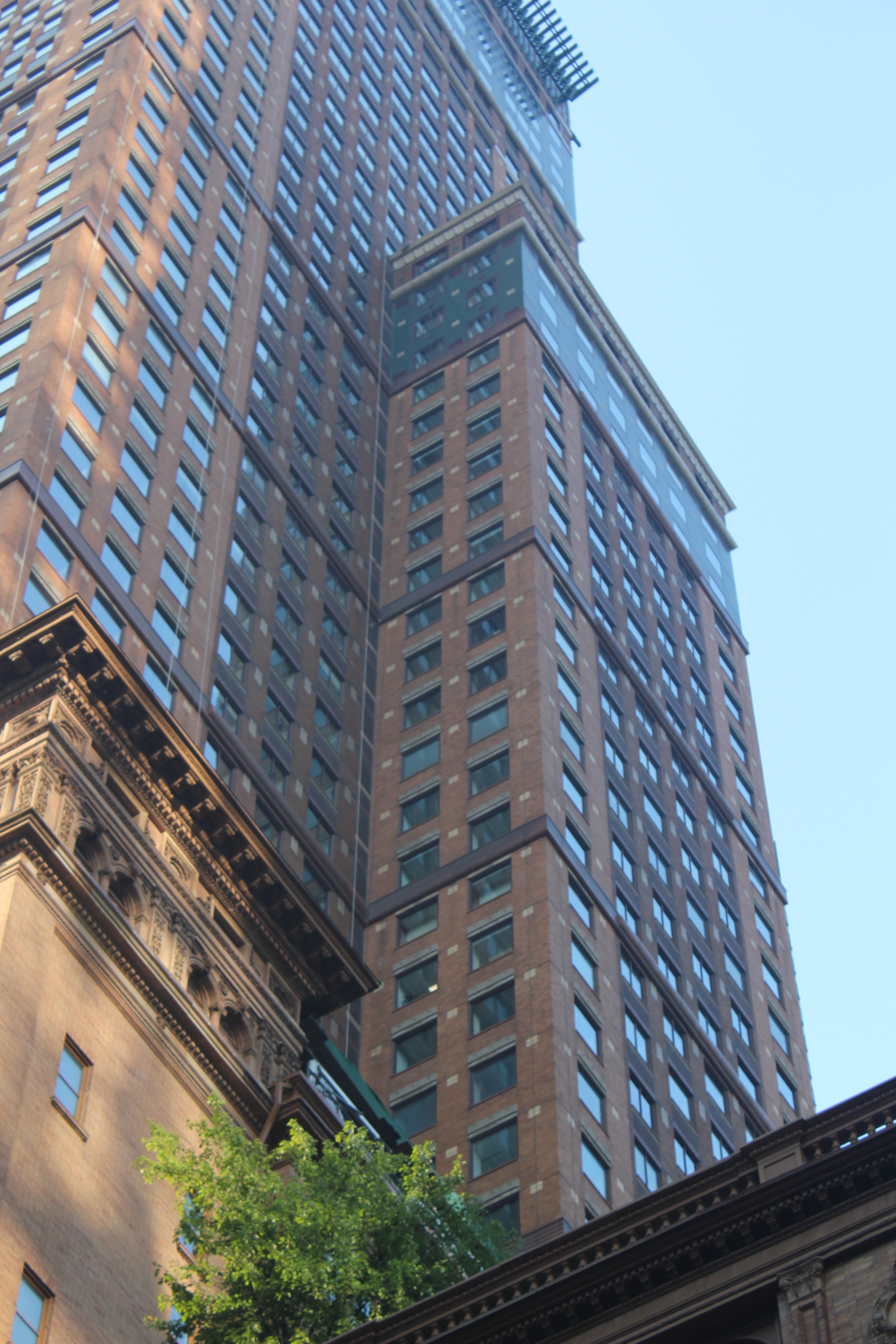
Facade at the 43rd-story setback

Carnegie Hall Tower contains a six-story base, above which rises the main tower. On 57th Street, the base of the building is only as tall as the original Carnegie Hall, which is seven stories high. The structure has an L-shaped plan through the 42nd floor, with a frontage of 50 feet (15 m) on the north and 75 feet (23 m) on the south. There is a single setback on the 43rd floor. Above that, the tower rises as a rectangular slab measuring 50 feet (15 m) wide and 140 feet (43 m) long. At the time of its completion, Carnegie Hall Tower was one of the world's most slender skyscrapers. As viewed from the west, Carnegie Hall Tower almost completely blocks the view of Metropolitan Tower to the east.

Carnegie Hall Tower has a red-and-orange brick facade and cast-concrete decorations, both inspired by the older structure. This was a contrast to contemporary buildings that were being built with steel or glass facades. Douglas Davis wrote for Newsweek: "Unlike the postmoderns, Pelli pushed the new technology of glass, plastic and wafer-thin stone to its limit—part of what he called 'extreme modernism'". The brick was used to complement the reddish brown Roman brick used in Carnegie Hall. The tower's developers contemplated using oven-fired brick, similar to that used in Carnegie Hall, but ultimately determined that to be too expensive.

The facade of the base on 57th Street is made of conventional brick, with three courses of brick corresponding to 8 inches (200 mm) of height. According to the project architect, Malcolm Roberts, the use of conventional brick was intended to make the building "humanly scaled to passersby". The base contains horizontal moldings that match both those of Carnegie Hall and the Russian Tea Room. Horizontal bands run below and above the second story on 57th Street, matching the third floor of the Russian Tea Room. A decorative band runs near the top of the sixth story, complementing a broad terracotta frieze at Carnegie Hall; it is interrupted by a set of windows. An aluminum molding, painted to resemble terracotta, runs above Carnegie Hall's sixth floor.

Above the base, the facade uses larger brick, with two courses corresponding to 8 inches. According to Pelli, "We chose a variety of brick, not only to relate the tower to Carnegie Hall, but to pop this building out on the skyline". The brick comes in 11 colors, including bright red and dark green. There are precast concrete lintels above windows, sills, and vertical accents. Painted metal bands wrap around the building at intervals of six floors. The top of the shaft contains a frieze made of dark green glazed brick. The large cornice above the shaft is an open trellis of wide-flange steel sections. This cornice is composed of I-beams that project 10 feet (3.0 m) from the top story's facade.

=== Structural features ===
The superstructure is made of concrete. The core consists of two joined tubes of cast-in-place concrete, designed by engineer Jacob Grossman of Robert Rosenwasser Associates. Grossman had found that concrete was more efficient than steel in reducing sway for such a narrow structure; under the same wind forces, a steel structure of the same size would sway for longer. The tubes connect to each other at the tower's center, and east-west spandrel beams extend from the core, further stiffening the superstructure. The roof contains space for a tuned mass damper, which could be installed if it were ever needed. The exterior walls double as wind-resisting elements since the windows are spaced closely and have small dimensions, similar to Carnegie Hall itself. At the time of completion, Carnegie Hall Tower was New York City's second-tallest, and the world's eighth-tallest, concrete building.

=== Interior ===
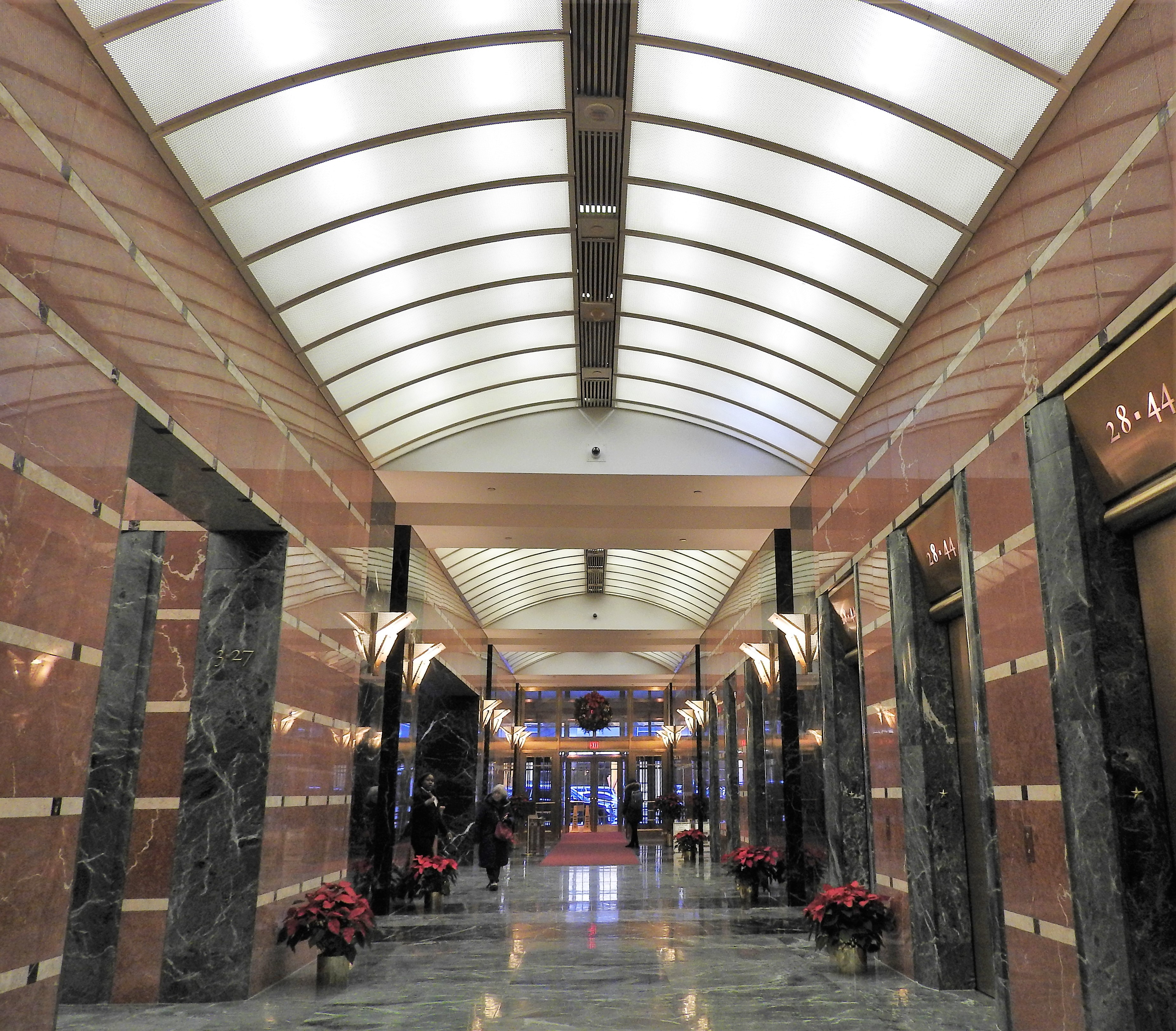
Lobby

According to the New York City Department of City Planning, the building has 542,584 square feet (50,407.7 m^{2}) of gross floor area. The building was designed with 485,000 square feet (45,100 m^{2}) for offices and 25,000 square feet (2,300 m^{2}) for Carnegie Hall. The rear of Carnegie Hall Tower contains offstage facilities for Carnegie Hall, spanning portions of the second through seventh stories.

The lobby contains walls and floors made of green, red, and black marble, with brass accents and metal-grille lamps on the walls. The vaulted ceiling is composed of translucent panels separated by metal ribs. There are elevators on either side of the lobby, as well as a guard desk. The lobby is one of nine passageways that form 6½ Avenue, a set of full-block passageways from 51st to 57th Street between Sixth and Seventh Avenues. It was built as a "through-block connection" under the Special Midtown District, created in 1982. Carnegie Hall Tower's lobby is one of three parallel passageways on the same block; the others are in Metropolitan Tower and the Parker New York hotel to the east. While the district no longer allows more than two "through-block connections" on the same block, these passageways all predate the rule modification.

Carnegie Hall's operator, Carnegie Hall Corporation, demolished the walls separating the second-story and third-story spaces from the original hall. The tower includes the venue's first freight elevator; before the tower's construction, pianos at Carnegie Hall were carried manually on staircases. The leased space in the tower includes the East Room, a 200-seat dining room that covers 1,972 square feet (183.2 m^{2}), and the Club Room, which covers 725 square feet (67.4 m^{2}). The East Room and Club Room were subsequently renamed the Rohatyn Room and Shorin Club Room, respectively. On the third floor, next to the Weill Recital Hall in the original building, is a 176-square-foot (16.4 m^{2}) catering lounge. A musicians' lounge, rehearsal space, and dressing rooms were also provided. The upper floors contain between 8,000 and 14,000 square feet (740 and 1,300 m^{2}) on each floor. A freight elevator and ten passenger elevators provide access to the upper floors.

== History ==
After the demolition of the Rembrandt Apartments in 1963, the site became a parking lot owned by the government of New York City. The Carnegie Hall Corporation operated Carnegie Hall and leased both the performance venue and the Rembrandt site from the city. In late 1980, the corporation and the New York City government signed a memorandum of understanding to allow the transfer of unused development rights above Carnegie Hall, as well as the development of the Rembrandt site. The city would receive tax revenue while the corporation would receive money for the hall's maintenance. Carnegie Hall's real estate director Lawrence Goldman stated that the lot's development would be the "motor that drives the engine" for the hall's renovation. Carnegie Hall's renovation, designed by Polshek Partnership, began in February 1982.

=== Development ===
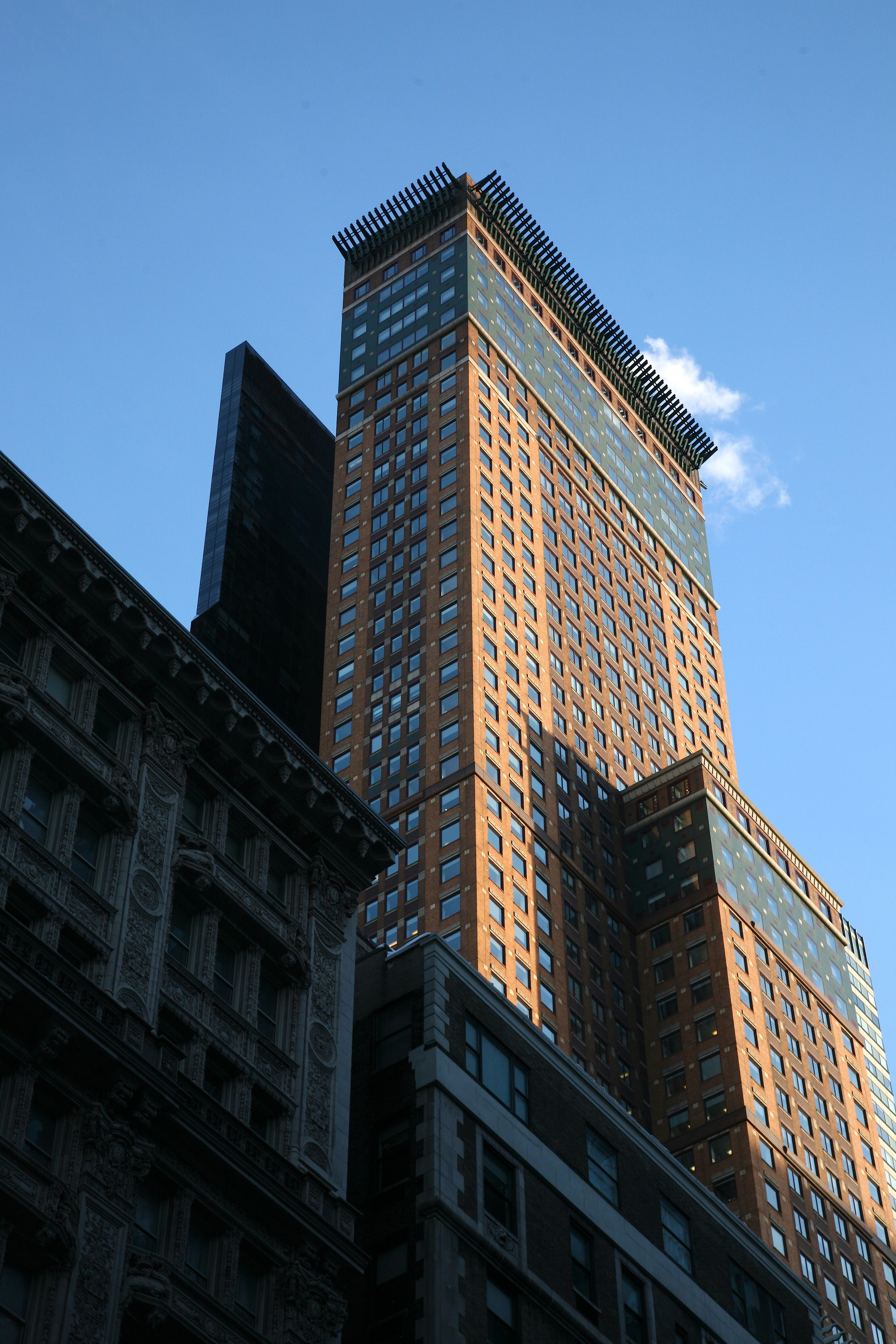
The eastern facade as seen from Seventh Avenue; the Metropolitan Tower can be seen to the left

In March 1982, the city issued a request for proposals for the vacant Rembrandt lot. All bids were required to include a facade that resembled the existing hall's facade, a seven-story building on 56th Street for offstage uses, and an expansion of Carnegie Hall's facilities in the base. Later that year, the Carnegie Hall Corporation began reviewing proposals for the lot. Three bidders were selected as finalists by mid-1983. They were Kaufman Realty with a plan by Cesar Pelli; Rockrose Development, with a plan by Charles Moore; and Harry B. Macklowe, with a plan by Skidmore, Owings & Merrill. Macklowe's bid, which called for a green-glass tower above a masonry base, was really a placeholder for another plan. Macklowe wished to combine the Rembrandt lot with a parcel to the east, which he already owned, but which was separated from the Rembrandt lot by the Russian Tea Room. If the three sites were combined, this could allow a 51-story tower with 1 million square feet (93,000 m^{2}). The Russian Tea Room's owners refused several offers to acquire their building, so Macklowe withdrew his bid for the Rembrandt site in 1983 and developed Metropolitan Tower on the other parcel.

Carnegie Hall officials were negotiating with Rockrose and Kaufman by late 1984. Rockrose replaced Moore with Pelli on its bid for the site. Rockrose and Pelli's bid was accepted in May 1985. (Note: Though Robert A. M. Stern cites the approval as being in June 1985, The New York Times had reported the news the previous month.) The tower was tentatively planned to include 4,500 square feet (420 m^{2}) of public space in the front, offstage areas in the rear, and an addition to Cafe Carnegie at ground level. Two-thirds of the tower would contain luxury residential condominiums, with the rest being office space. The development was planned to earn $800,000 a year for the Carnegie Hall Corporation. In April 1986, Carnegie officials announced their intent to sublease the vacant lot to Rockrose for 99 years. The building was one of several high-rise developments planned for the area at the time. In addition to Macklowe's and Carnegie Hall's developments, Bruce Eichner was developing CitySpire on a plot adjacent to the New York City Center.

The tower needed approval from the Landmarks Preservation Commission (LPC), which had previously designated Carnegie Hall as a city landmark; the Board of Estimate; the City Planning Commission; and Manhattan Community Board 5, whose community district included Carnegie Hall. The LPC approved the project in October 1986, and the Board of Estimate gave final approval in September 1987. An official groundbreaking ceremony took place on November 20, 1987, attended by Carnegie Hall president Isaac Stern, Carnegie Hall chairman James Wolfensohn, Rockrose president Henry Elghanayan, and mayor Ed Koch. The foundation was excavated over two and a half months; blasting for the foundation was coordinated to avoid interference with dining or concerts. The cornerstone was laid on May 13, 1988, the 98th anniversary of the cornerstone-laying of Carnegie Hall itself. The tower's foundations were completed that month, but the Russian Tea Room refused to sell either its building or its air rights. In mid-1989, Fuji Bank Ltd loaned $125 million to Rockrose for the development of Carnegie Hall Tower.

=== Usage ===
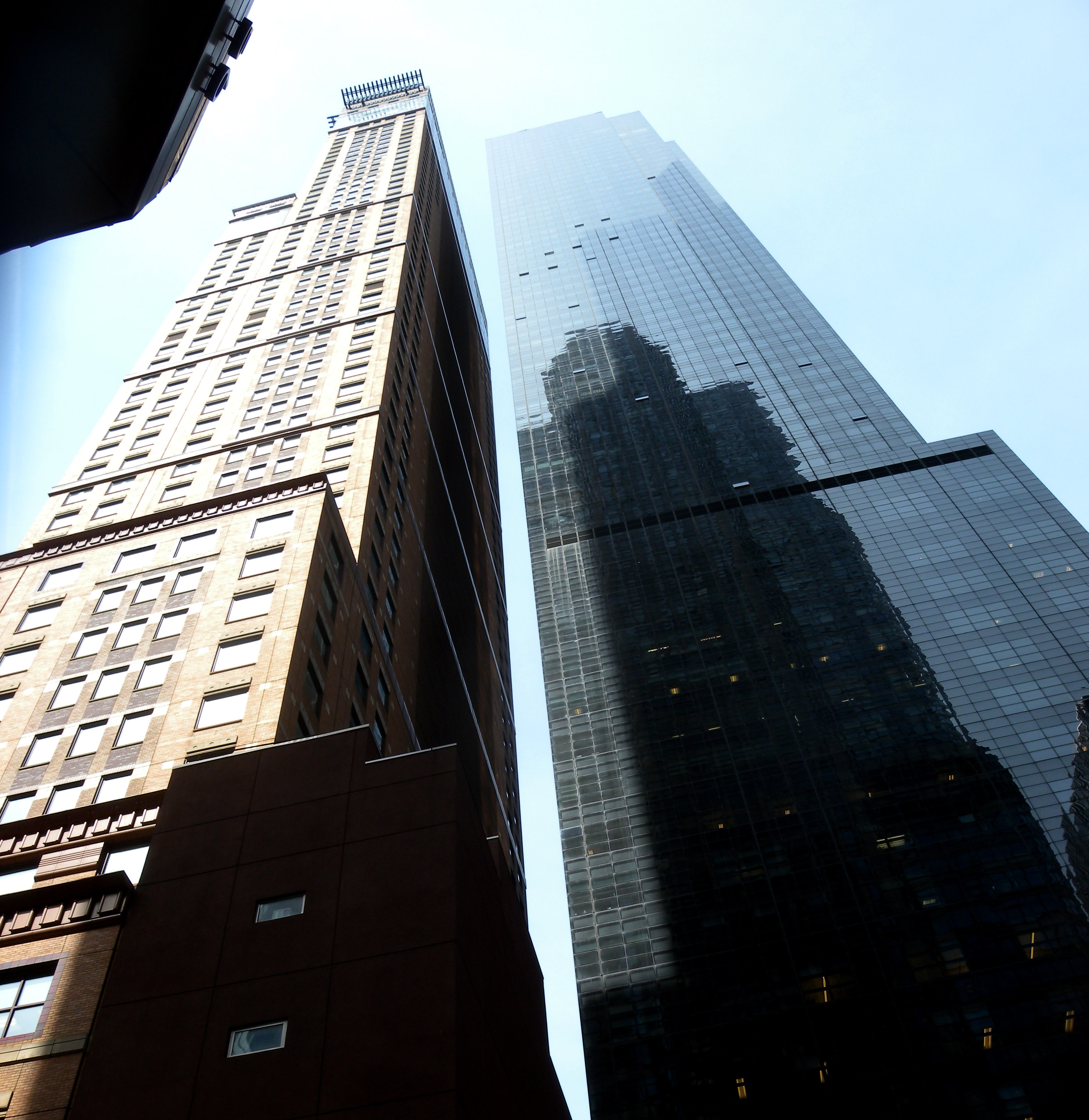
Carnegie Hall Tower (left) and Metropolitan Tower (right) viewed from 56th Street

Newmark & Co. was hired as the leasing agent in February 1990, at which point no leases had been signed. Though the building was nearing completion, it had over 460,000 square feet (43,000 m^{2}) available for lease that August, representing most of its office space. The building opened the following month, despite a weak office market. Because of the recession at the time, Carnegie Hall Tower was viewed in the real-estate industry as a "see-through office building", with no tenants and a low probability of attracting tenants. Rockrose began negotiating with businesses in the fashion, law, and entertainment industries. Part of the appeal to small firms was the tax abatements offered to tenants in exchange for Rockrose providing space at the tower's base for Carnegie Hall. The venue's expansion into the tower's base opened in April 1991 with an exhibit of memorabilia from Pyotr Ilyich Tchaikovsky.

In May 1991, Rockrose launched a "small-space program" for tenants requiring as little as 2,000 square feet (190 m^{2}). A Newmark agent said at the time that fourteen of the building's twenty tenants were expanding compared to their previous spaces. The offices, with asking rents of $33 to $60 per square foot ($360 to $650/m^{2}), attracted small tenants such as Capitol-EMI and Kenneth Cole Productions. Hedge funds, as well as financial and law companies, also found the small floor areas to be useful. The building also benefited from a shift in office demand from Sixth Avenue and Park Avenue. A commercial space was leased to coffee shop Philip's Coffee in 1992. Rockrose furnished some "prebuilt" office space at the base and middle floors. The prebuilt units were expensive but, after they were rented successfully, Rockrose furnished some prebuilt space on the 52nd floor.

By the late 1990s, Carnegie Hall Tower had enough tenants that it was no longer in debt. Daryl Roth Productions and CNBC were among the building's tenants at this time. Outgoing U.S. President Bill Clinton had planned to move his office to the tower's 56th floor in 2001, but he instead chose office space in Harlem after controversy over the costs of space in the tower, estimated at $98 per square foot ($1,050/m^{2}). By 2007, Carnegie Hall Tower was marketing its 40th and 41st floors at $175 per square foot ($1,880/m^{2}) per year, although its lowest floors were advertised at only $65 per square foot ($700/m^{2}) per year. By contrast, the average annual rent for "premium" Midtown office space was $85 per square foot ($910/m^{2}) per year. Nearby buildings such as 712 Fifth Avenue, the Solow Building, the General Motors Building, and 888 Seventh Avenue also had high asking rates.

In 2017, the building was refinanced with a $325 million loan from MetLife. This was the fifth refinancing for the property since it opened. Among the building's tenants in the 2010s were Naftali Group and Fairstead Capital. Other tenants moved into the building in the 2020s, including Melius Research, Secunda Family Foundation, and Pearl World.

== Reception ==
When Carnegie Hall Tower was being planned, Paul Goldberger of The New York Times wrote that Pelli "has responded admirably" to the presence of several skyscrapers in the vicinity, including Metropolitan Tower several feet east. He wrote that Carnegie Hall Tower "is far from neutral, but it is a masterwork of respectful, responsible urbanism". Goldberger did express concerns that the building's height made it "entirely out of scale with the landmark beside it". Similarly, Architectural Record magazine said the ornamentation and the facade were "thoughtful references" to the design of Carnegie Hall, but the tower's height "will render such relational gestures meaningless". Progressive Architecture said Carnegie Hall Tower, as well as nearby skyscrapers being designed on side streets, "break Manhattan's pattern of high-rise on the avenues, low-rise at midblock".

After the building was completed, Goldberger characterized the tower as "one of the most convincing essays in creative historicism on any urban skyline" and praised the building as "evocative, not derivative". Kurt Andersen wrote for Time magazine, "This slender, elegant slab is like a dancer among thugs", praising it as "the finest high-rise to go up in New York City in a generation". Conversely, Carter Wiseman of New York magazine regarded the tower as "much too tall" but also "perilously unsubstantial" as seen from the north or south. Karrie Jacobs of the same magazine described the upper stories as an "afterthought" to the base, which "masquerades as a walk-up, cornice kissing cornice". CitySpire, Carnegie Hall Tower, and Metropolitan Tower became known as the "Tuning Fork Trio" because of their shape and proximity to each other. John McPhee of The New Yorker wrote in 2003 that the buildings "look like three chopsticks incongruously holding a cocktail blini", as they surrounded the small Russian Tea Room.

Time magazine listed the tower among its "Best of" design picks in 1990. Carnegie Hall Tower's design won the Honor Award from the American Institute of Architects in 1994, and Pelli himself was awarded the AIA Gold Medal in 1995.

== See also ==
- List of tallest buildings in New York City
- List of tallest buildings in the United States
