= 140 West 57th Street =

Office building in Manhattan, New York

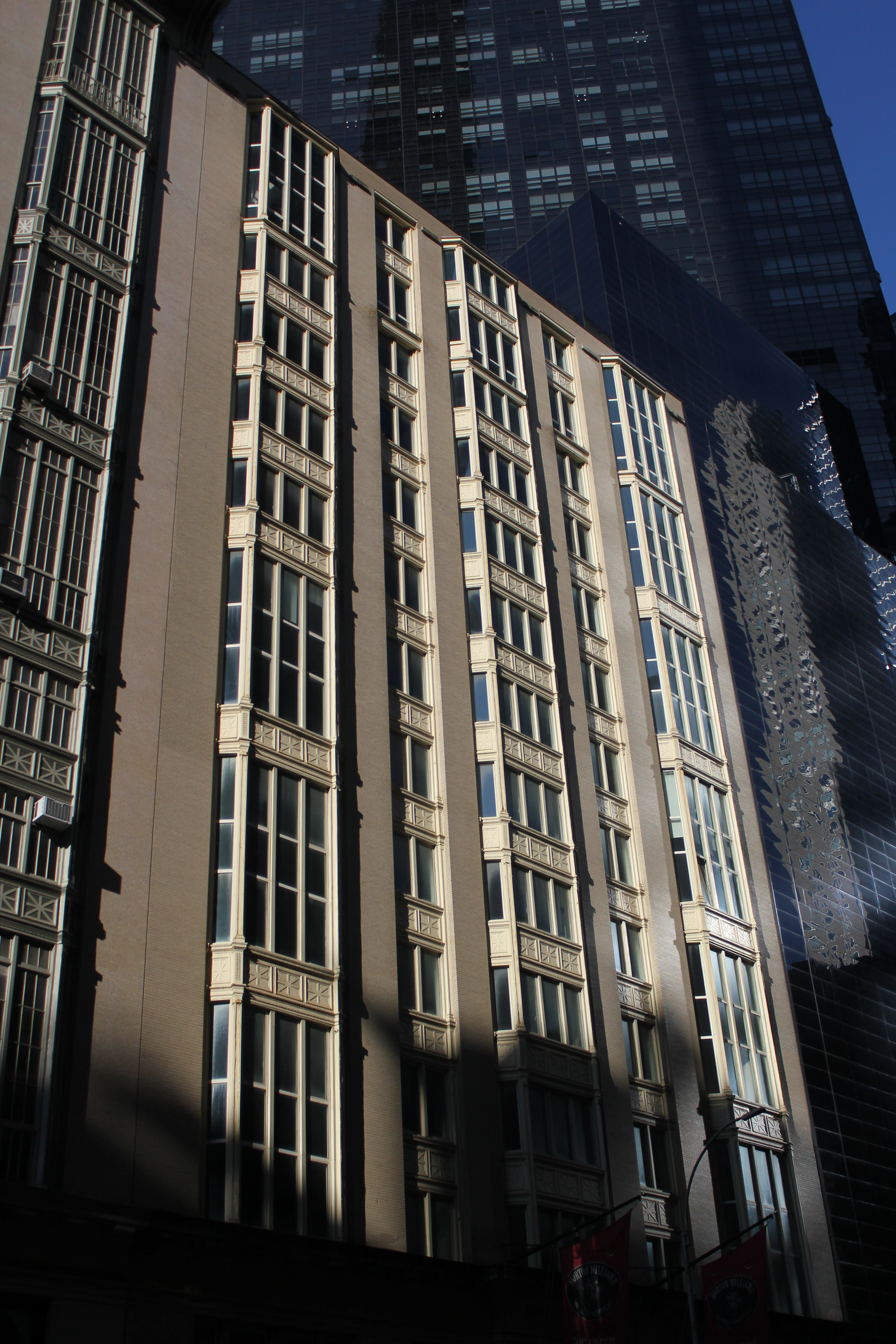
- Interactive map of the 140 West 57th Street area

General information
- Type: Commercial
- Location: 140 West 57th Street, Manhattan, New York, United States
- Coordinates: 40°45′53″N 73°58′44″W
- Groundbreaking: 1907
- Opened: 1909
- Owner: The Feil Organization

Height
- Architectural: 150 ft (46 m)

Technical details
- Floor count: 15

Design and construction
- Architects: Pollard and Steinam
- Developer: 136 West 57th Street Corporation
- Main contractor: William J. Taylor Co-Operative

New York City Landmark
- Designated: October 19, 1999
- Reference no.: 2043

140 West 57th Street, also known as The Beaufort or Parc Beaufort, is an office building on 57th Street between Sixth Avenue and Seventh Avenue in Midtown Manhattan in New York City. It was built from 1907 to 1909 and designed by Pollard and Steinam, who also simultaneously designed the neighboring, nearly identical building at 130 West 57th Street. The buildings are among several in Manhattan that were built in the early 20th century as both studio and residences for artists.

140 West 57th Street is fifteen stories tall, with fourteen stories facing 57th Street, as well as a penthouse. The lowest two stories of the primary facade along 57th Street are clad in limestone, while the upper stories are clad in brick. The facade contains both broad and narrow bays with metal-framed studio windows, some of which are double-height. Along 57th Street, there are cornices above the second story. There were double-height studios on the 57th Street side and smaller residences at the back of the building.

140 West 57th Street was developed upon land owned by artist Robert Vonnoh. Although marketed as artists' studios, 140 West 57th Street was also home to lawyers, stock brokers, teachers, and other professionals. The building was converted into a rental-apartment structure in 1944, and was subsequently converted into an office building during the late 20th century. 140 West 57th Street was designated a city landmark by the New York City Landmarks Preservation Commission in 1999.

== Site ==
140 West 57th Street is on the southern side of 57th Street between Sixth Avenue and Seventh Avenue, two blocks south of Central Park in the Midtown Manhattan neighborhood of New York City. According to the New York City Department of City Planning, the lot measures 80 feet (24 m) wide along 57th Street and is 100 feet (30 m) deep. The building abuts Metropolitan Tower to the west and 130 West 57th Street to the east. Other nearby buildings include the Russian Tea Room, Carnegie Hall Tower, and Carnegie Hall to the west; the Louis H. Chalif Normal School of Dancing and One57 to the northwest; the Nippon Club Tower and Calvary Baptist Church to the north; 111 West 57th Street to the northeast; the Parker New York hotel to the east; and CitySpire, New York City Center, and 125 West 55th Street to the south.

130 and 140 West 57th Street are part of a former artistic hub around a two-block section of West 57th Street between Sixth Avenue and Broadway. The hub had been developed during the late 19th and early 20th centuries, following the opening of the nearby Carnegie Hall in 1891. Several buildings in the area were constructed as residences for artists and musicians, such as 130 and 140 West 57th Street, the Rodin Studios, and the Osborne, as well as the demolished Sherwood Studios and Rembrandt. In addition, the area contained the headquarters of organizations such as the American Fine Arts Society, the Lotos Club, and the American Society of Civil Engineers. By the 21st century, the artistic hub had largely been replaced with Billionaires' Row, a series of luxury skyscrapers around the southern end of Central Park. The sites occupied by 130 and 140 West 57th Street were historically occupied by brownstone townhouses in the late 19th century.

== Architecture ==
140 West 57th Street was designed by Pollard and Steinam, who also designed the neighboring studios at 130 West 57th Street. Both structures were constructed simultaneously and were designed nearly identically as studio apartments for artists. 140 West 57th Street is 150 feet (46 m) tall; the front portion along 57th Street contains 14 stories while the rear portion contains 12 stories. The building has also historically been known as The Beaufort. It is one of a few remaining artists' studio buildings in New York City with distinct living and working spaces for artists.

=== Facade ===
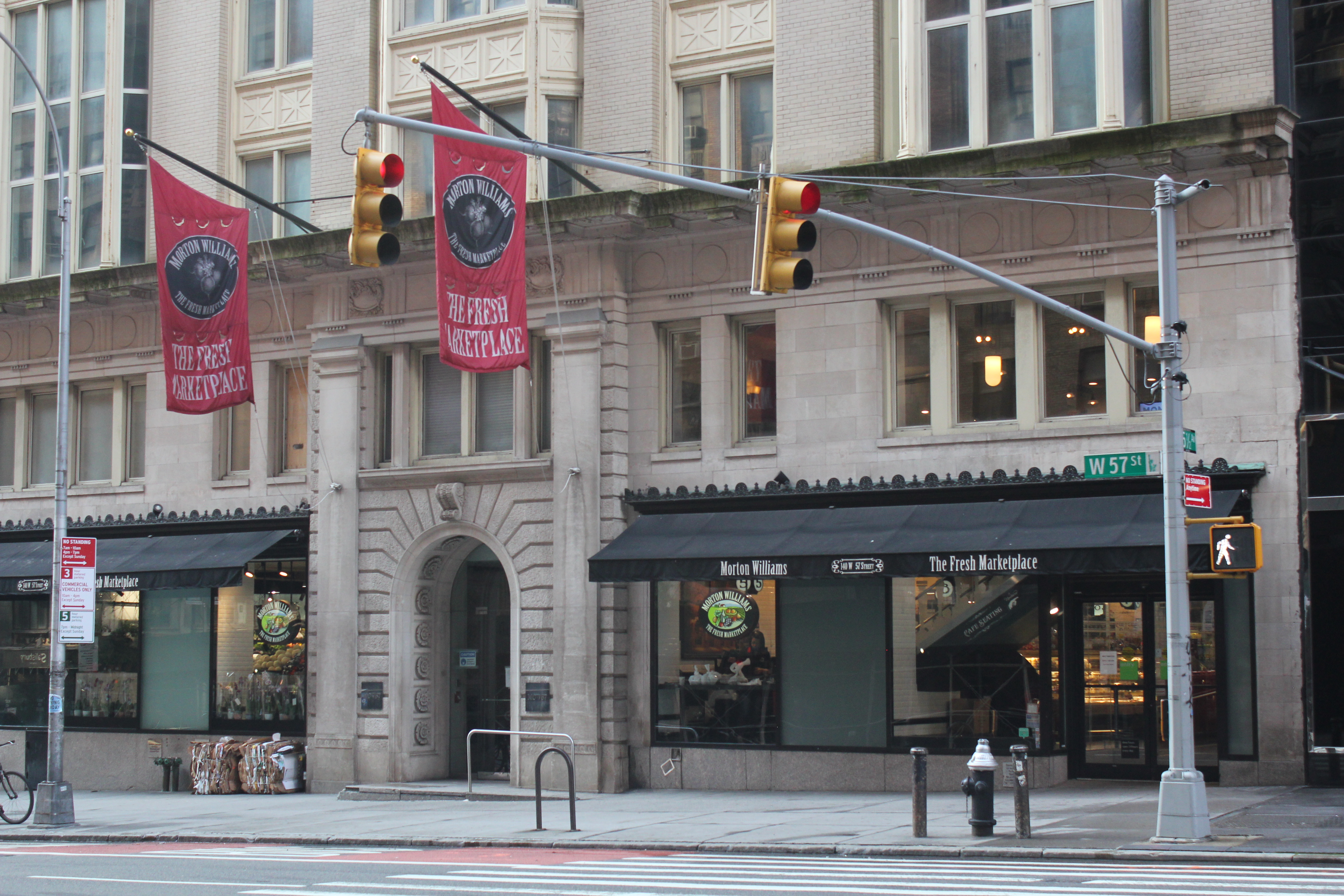
Base of 140 West 57th Street

The main facade overlooking 57th Street consists of five vertical bays, which contain metal windows and are separated by brick piers. The westernmost, center, and easternmost bays are wider, and alternate with two narrower bays. The rear facade is made of brick.

The base is composed of the first and second stories. At the base, the central bay contains a slightly projecting entrance pavilion clad with rusticated and vermiculated limestone blocks. Within this entrance pavilion is an arch with voussoirs flanking a volute above the top of the arch, and a double door flanked by a pair of flat pilasters. The remainder of the base contains storefronts or store entrances on the first story. The second story contains multi-section rectangular windows in the wide bays and pairs of sash windows in the narrow bays. Atop the second story is a projecting terracotta cornice, which contains a frieze with alternating circles and triglyphs, as well as a pattern of mutules alternating with rosettes or lozenges on the underside of the cornice.

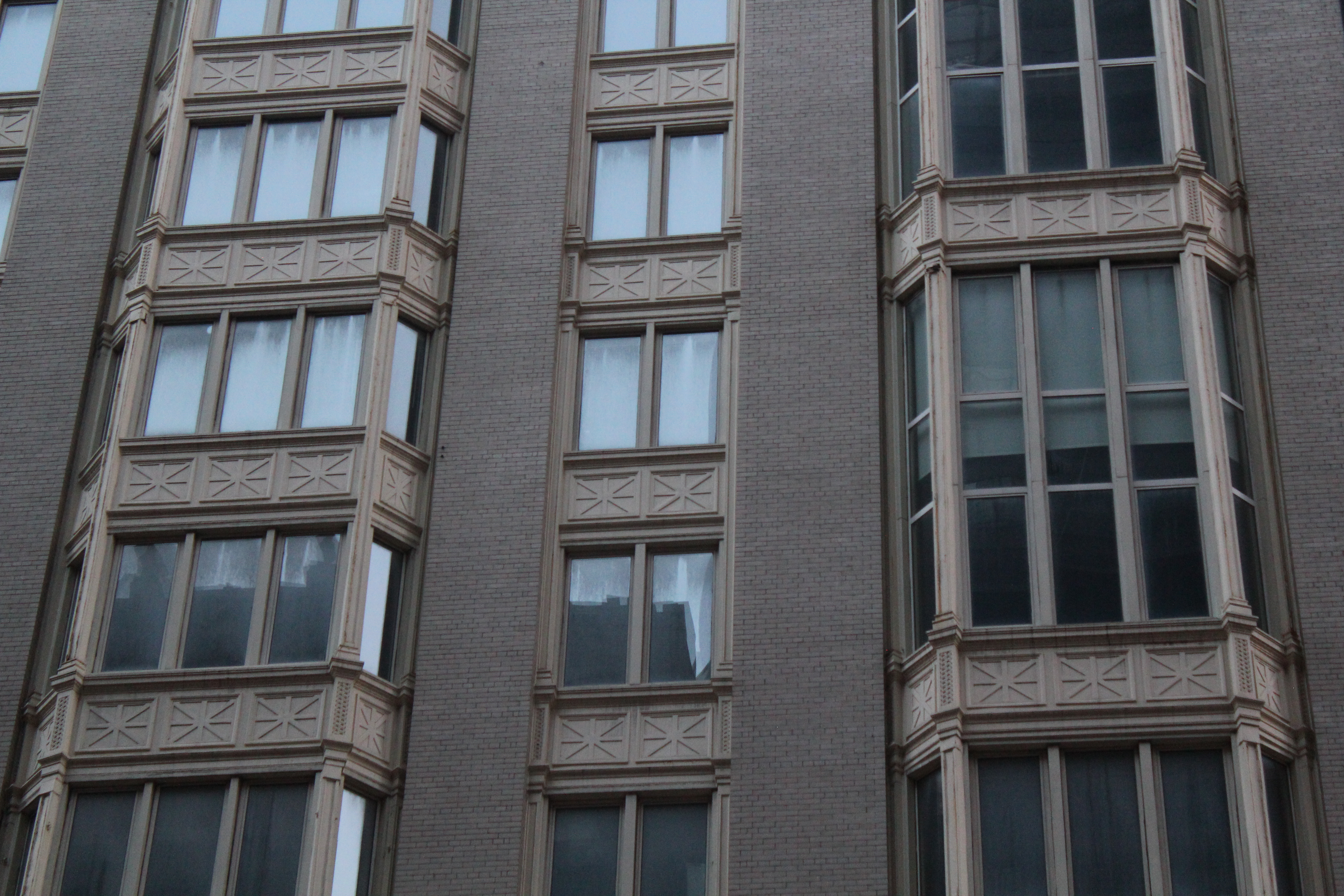
Close up of facade, showing the western three bays

The twelve upper stories are similar in design to each other and contain several types of windows. The windows in the outermost wide bays, and on the third through tenth stories of the center bay, project slightly from the facade and contain trapezoidal frames. The outermost bays contain double-height windows. These double-height windows were designed to maximize sun exposure. The windows in the narrow bays, and in the eleventh through fourteenth stories of the center bay, do not project. In all bays, there are geometric white-painted spandrels between the windows on each story, and the windows have white mullions. The original design contained a metal cornice above the fourteenth story, matching that of 130 West 57th Street, but the cornice was removed sometime in the 20th century.

=== Interior ===
The building was designed with 36 studios. Its location on the south side of 57th Street, a major road that was wider than parallel streets, ensured that the interiors would be brightly lit by sunlight from the north, for the benefit of the artists working there. The interiors contained double-height studios, characterized by House Beautiful magazine as "a splendid backdrop for tapestry or painting". The double-height studios were behind the wide bays facing 57th Street, and each contained a living room, kitchen, four bedrooms, and servants' rooms. Behind the narrow bays were studio rooms, some of which could be used as separate apartments. There were smaller apartments in the rear, which contained two bedrooms and a kitchenette. The building had separate elevators for passengers and freight, as well as resident amenities such as a vacuum cleaning facility, a laundry room, a mail chute, dumbwaiters, and telephone service in each residence.

140 West 57th Street was altered in 1998 and reclassified as a mid-rise office building with commercial units. According to the Department of City Planning, the building has a gross floor area of 90,000 square feet (8,400 m^{2}) and has a single unit. By 2026, the interior had been converted into 47 apartments. The smallest units are studio apartments, while the largest units had three bedrooms; most of the units are one-bedroom apartments of 700 to 1,100 square feet (65 to 102 m^{2}). The lobby has a sandstone and marble floor with a plaster barrel vault on the ceiling. The building also has amenity spaces such as a roof terrace, gym, and lounge.

== History ==
Cooperative apartment housing in New York City became popular in the late 19th century because of overcrowded housing conditions in the city's dense urban areas. When 140 West 57th Street was constructed, there were some co-ops in the city that catered specifically to artists, including the Bryant Park Studios and the Carnegie Studios, but these were almost always fully occupied and did not provide adequate space for artists to both live and work. The 67th Street Studios, constructed between 1901 and 1903 at 23–29 West 67th Street in what later became the West 67th Street Artists' Colony near Central Park, were the first artists' cooperatives in the city that were also specifically designed to provide duplex working and living areas for artists. The success of the 67th Street Studios prompted the development of other artists' studios in that area.

=== Artists' studios ===
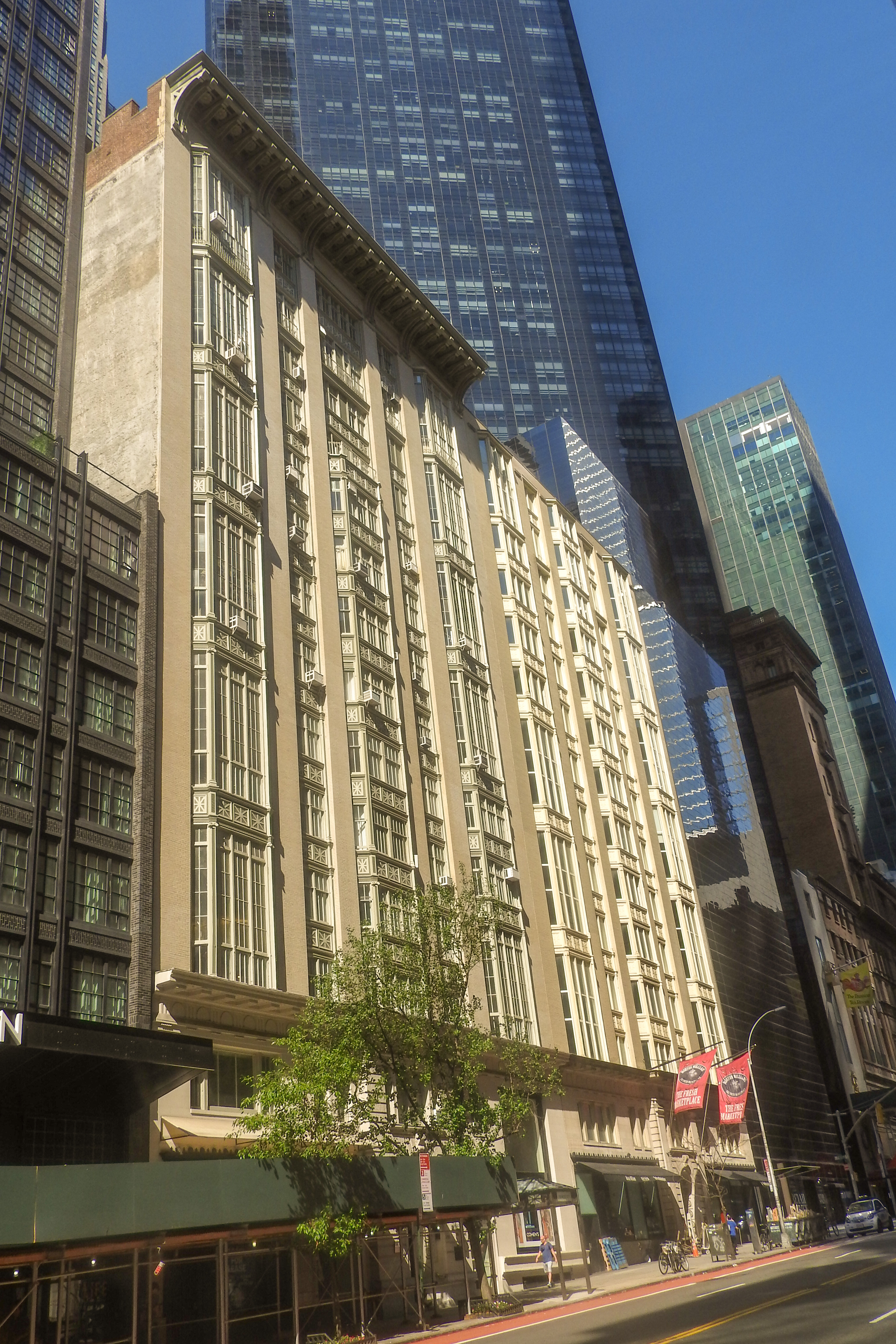
130 West 57th Street (left) and 140 West 57th Street (right), with the Metropolitan Tower visible at far right

Robert Vonnoh, an artist residing in one of the 67th Street Studios, bought four brownstone townhouses at 134–142 West 57th Street in mid-1907. Ownership of the brownstones was transferred to the 136 West 57th Street Corporation that August. The corporation was operated by president Walter G. Merritt and secretary Payson McL. Merrill. Pollard and Steinam were hired to design a $500,000 apartment house at the site, with seven double-height stories in the front and twelve single-height stories in the rear. The architects had also been hired for the nearly identical, adjacent development at 130 West 57th Street, developed by the same individuals. Building permits for 140 West 57th Street were filed with the New York City Department of Buildings in December 1907. The construction contract was awarded to William J. Taylor, and funded with a $475,000 loan from the Metropolitan Life Insurance Company. The building was completed in January 1909.

Although marketed as artists' studios, 140 West 57th Street was also home to lawyers, stock brokers, teachers, and other professionals. The tenants included opera singer Beniamino Gigli, as well as sculptor and forger Ernest Durig. The building originally had an entrance staircase, but it was removed in 1922 as part of a project to widen West 57th Street. Sometime during the 20th century, the original cornice was removed and the ground story storefronts were installed.

=== Later use ===
==== 1940s to 1990s ====
The building was converted to a rental apartment in 1944. The Dry Dock Savings Institution sold the building to an investment syndicate for $335,000 cash in January 1945. The building was resold to the Parkbridge Corporation in late April 1945, and resold again within one week. At the time, 140 West 57th Street had 68 residential units and two stores.

When Macklowe Properties bought 140 West 57th Street in 1981, the building still contained residential units. Harry Macklowe, the head of Macklowe Properties, transferred some of the air rights above 140 West 57th Street to the adjacent plot to the west in 1984. This enabled the Metropolitan Tower, which was being built on that plot, to be erected at a greater height than would be normally allowed under zoning codes. Macklowe also planned to reface 140 West 57th Street with a glass facade, but he decided against doing so. Planet Hollywood opened a location at the building's base in 1991, and the Motown Cafe and Planet Hollywood's Merch Shop occupied the storefronts at 130 and 140 West 57th Street. Macklowe wished to convert the building to office space, and between 1995 and 1998, bought out the last residents. MdeAS Architects designed the offices, including one for interior designer Brian J. McCarthy that included one of the original studios. The New York City Landmarks Preservation Commission (LPC) designated 130 West 57th Street as an official city landmark on October 19, 1999.

==== 2000s to present ====
The Planet Hollywood at the building's base had closed by late 2000, when the restaurant moved to Times Square. During the early 21st century, office tenants included a consultant group, a violin reseller, a triathlon athletes' specialty company, and a jewelry showroom. By 2008, Macklowe was in debt and placed 140 West 57th Street for sale; The Feil Organization purchased 140 West 57th Street the next year for $59 million. In 2015, Feil hired Goldstein Hill & West to conduct a study on the feasibility of converting the building back to residential use, and the architects found that the building could be expanded by about 11,000 square feet (1,000 m^{2}). Feil stopped renewing leases for 140 West 57th Street's office space in early 2016, and Goldstein Hill & West filed plans that November to convert the building to 34 residential condominiums. After Feil found that the air-rights transfer in 1984 prevented the expansion of the building, the company sued Goldstein Hill & West.

By 2018, Feil wanted to sell 140 West 57th Street, which was vacant. The COVID-19 pandemic in New York City depressed demand for offices. MdeAS Architects submitted revised plans to the LPC in July 2020, which entailed modifying the facade, reinstalling the cornice, expanding the 13th story at the rear, and converting the interior to a commercial structure. The building was to be converted into commercial units, with two per floor.

In 2025, Feil submitted revised plans to the New York City Department of Buildings, which entailed converting the building into 47 apartments; these plans were also designed by MdeAS. Stephen Sills Associates was hired as the interior designer for the project, which was branded the Parc Beaufort. Feil also received a $65 million loan to pay for the conversion. As part of the residential conversion, the lobby was refurbished, and several amenity spaces were added. The renovation was nearly completed by May 2026, when the first apartments went on sale. The project cost $45 million in total.

== See also ==
- List of New York City Designated Landmarks in Manhattan from 14th to 59th Streets
