= 130 West 57th Street =

Office building in Manhattan, New York

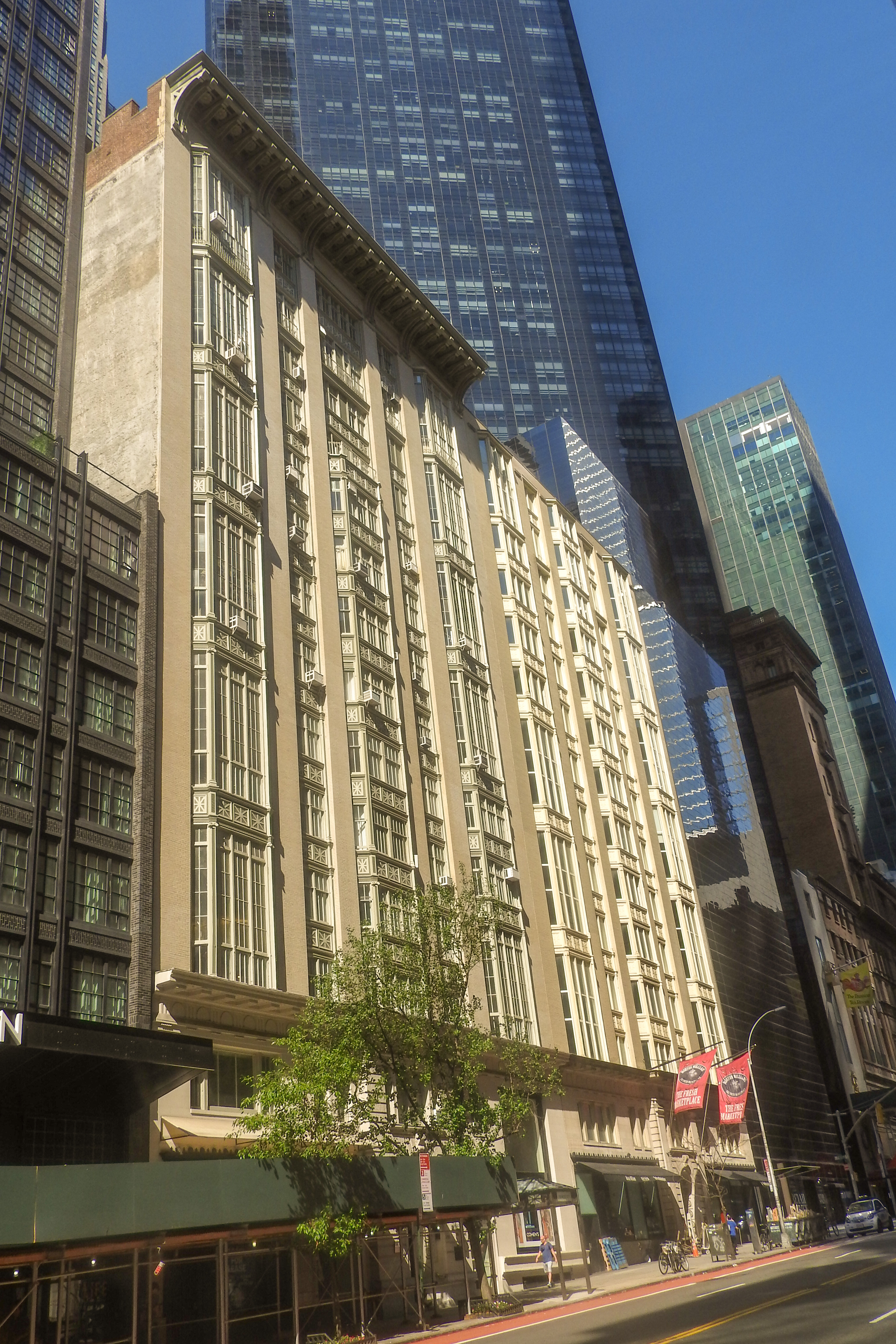
- Interactive map of the 130 West 57th Street area

General information
- Type: Commercial
- Location: 130 West 57th Street, Manhattan, New York, United States
- Coordinates: 40°45′53″N 73°58′43″W
- Groundbreaking: 1907
- Opened: 1908
- Owner: 130 West 57 Company

Height
- Architectural: 150 ft (46 m)

Technical details
- Floor count: 15

Design and construction
- Architects: Pollard and Steinam
- Developer: 130 West 57th Street Corporation
- Main contractor: William J. Taylor Co-Operative

New York City Landmark
- Designated: October 19, 1999
- Reference no.: 2042

130 West 57th Street is an office building on 57th Street between Sixth Avenue and Seventh Avenue in Midtown Manhattan in New York City. It was built from 1907 to 1908 and designed by Pollard and Steinam, who also simultaneously designed the neighboring, nearly identical building at 140 West 57th Street. The buildings are among several in Manhattan that were built in the early 20th century as both studio and residences for artists.

130 West 57th Street is fifteen stories tall, with fourteen stories facing 57th Street, as well as a penthouse. The lowest two stories of the primary facade along 57th Street are clad in limestone, while the upper stories are clad in brick. The facade contains both broad and narrow bays with metal-framed studio windows, some of which are double-height. Along 57th Street, there are cornices above the second and fourteenth stories. There were double-height studios on the 57th Street side and smaller residences at the back of the building.

130 West 57th Street was developed upon land owned by artist Robert Vonnoh. Although marketed as artists' studios, 130 West 57th Street was also home to lawyers, stock brokers, teachers, and other professionals. The building was converted into a rental-apartment structure in 1937, and was subsequently converted into an office building during the late 20th century. 130 West 57th Street was designated a city landmark by the New York City Landmarks Preservation Commission in 1999.

== Site ==
130 West 57th Street is on the southern side of 57th Street between Sixth Avenue and Seventh Avenue, two blocks south of Central Park in the Midtown Manhattan neighborhood of New York City. According to the New York City Department of City Planning, the lot measures 80 feet (24 m) wide along 57th Street and is 100 feet (30 m) deep. The building abuts 140 West 57th Street to the west and the Parker New York hotel to the east. Other nearby buildings include Metropolitan Tower, Russian Tea Room, Carnegie Hall Tower, and Carnegie Hall to the west; the Louis H. Chalif Normal School of Dancing and One57 to the northwest; the Nippon Club Tower and Calvary Baptist Church to the north; 111 West 57th Street to the northeast; and CitySpire, New York City Center, and 125 West 55th Street to the south.

130 and 140 West 57th Street are part of a former artistic hub around a two-block section of West 57th Street between Sixth Avenue and Broadway. The hub had been developed during the late 19th and early 20th centuries, following the opening of the nearby Carnegie Hall in 1891. Several buildings in the area were constructed as residences for artists and musicians, such as 130 and 140 West 57th Street, the Rodin Studios, and the Osborne, as well as the demolished Sherwood Studios and Rembrandt. In addition, the area contained the headquarters of organizations such as the American Fine Arts Society, the Lotos Club, and the American Society of Civil Engineers. By the 21st century, the artistic hub had largely been replaced with Billionaires' Row, a series of luxury skyscrapers around the southern end of Central Park. The sites occupied by 130 and 140 West 57th Street were historically occupied by brownstone townhouses in the late 19th century.

== Architecture ==
130 West 57th Street was designed by Pollard and Steinam, who also designed the neighboring studios at 140 West 57th Street. Both structures were constructed simultaneously and were designed nearly identically as studio apartments for artists. 130 West 57th Street is 150 feet (46 m) tall; the front portion along 57th Street contains 14 stories while the rear portion contains 12 stories. It is one of a few remaining artists' studio buildings in New York City with distinct living and working spaces for artists.

=== Facade ===
The main facade overlooking 57th Street consists of five vertical bays, which contain metal windows and are separated by brick piers. The westernmost, center, and easternmost bays are wider, and alternate with two narrower bays. The rear facade is made of brick.

The base is composed of the first and second stories. At the base, the central bay contains a slightly projecting entrance pavilion clad with rusticated and vermiculated limestone blocks. Within this entrance pavilion is an arch with voussoirs flanking a volute above the top of the arch, and a double door approached from a small stoop. A metal and glass canopy, installed in 2000, extends from the entrance into the sidewalk. The remainder of the base contains storefronts or store entrances on the first story. The westernmost wide bay contains a double-height display window, while the other second-story bays contain either pairs of sash windows or multi-pane rectangular windows. Atop the second story is a projecting terracotta cornice, which contains a frieze with alternating circles and triglyphs, as well as a pattern of mutules alternating with rosettes or lozenges on the underside of the cornice.

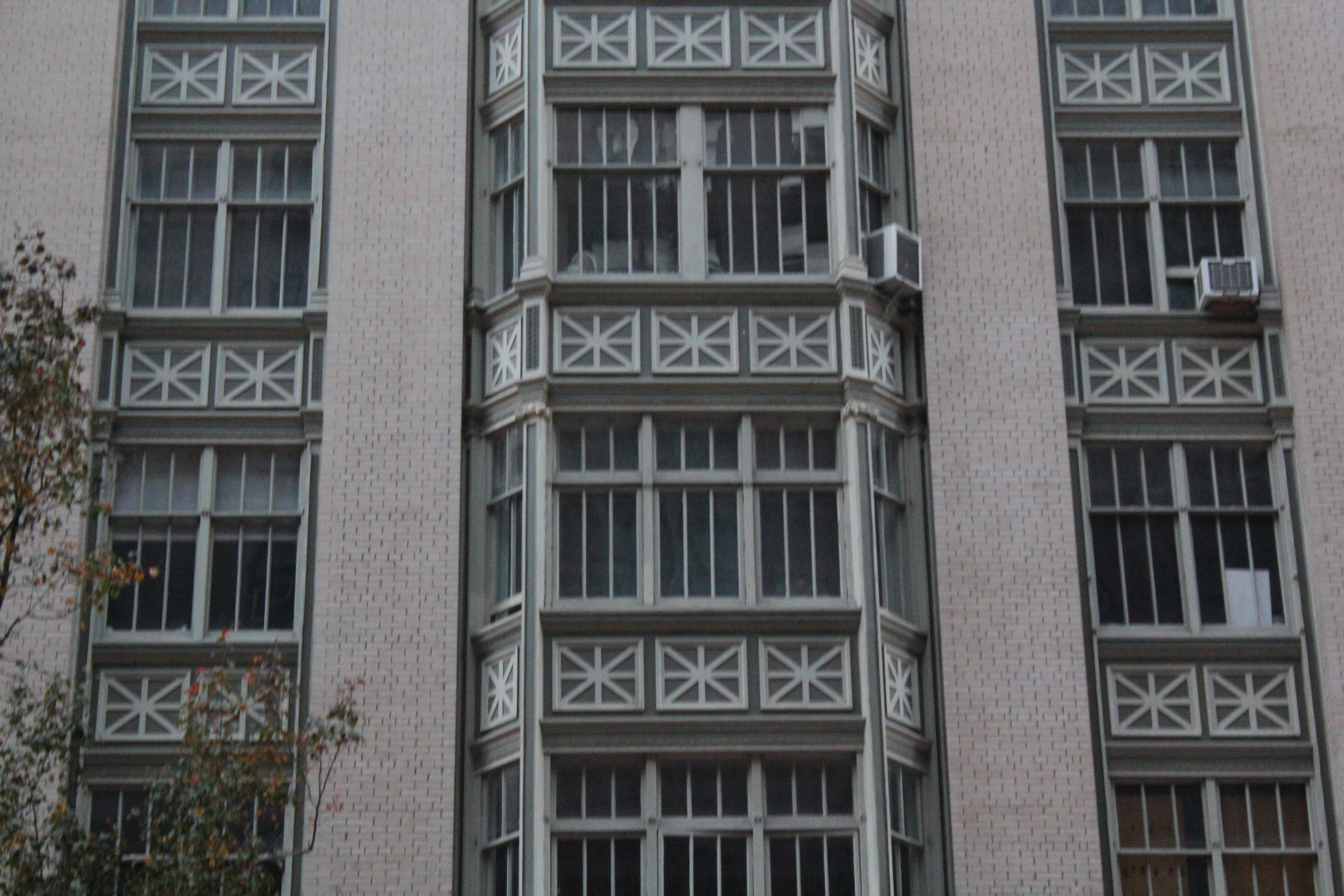
Close up of facade, showing the center three bays

The twelve upper stories are similar in design to each other and contain several types of windows. The windows in the outermost wide bays, and on the third through tenth stories of the center bay, project slightly from the facade and contain trapezoidal frames. The outermost bays contain double-height windows. The windows in the narrow bays, and in the eleventh through fourteenth stories of the center bay, do not project. In all bays, there are geometric olive-painted spandrels between the windows on each story, and the windows have olive mullions. There is another cornice above the fourteenth story, with modillions beneath it. The cornice rests on six large pairs of iron brackets, which are aligned with the tops of the brick piers.

=== Interior ===
The building was designed with 36 studios. Its location on the south side of 57th Street, a major road that was wider than parallel streets, ensured that the interiors would be brightly lit by sunlight from the north, for the benefit of the artists working there. The interiors contained double-height studios, characterized by House Beautiful magazine as "a splendid backdrop for tapestry or painting". The double-height studios were behind the wide bays facing 57th Street, and each contained a living room, kitchen, four bedrooms, and servants' rooms. Behind the narrow bays were studio rooms, some of which could be used as separate apartments. There were smaller apartments in the rear, which contained two bedrooms and a kitchenette. The building had separate elevators for passengers and freight, as well as resident amenities such as a vacuum cleaning facility, a laundry room, a mail chute, dumbwaiters, and telephone service in each residence.

130 West 57th Street was altered in 1987 and reclassified as a mid-rise office building with commercial units. According to the Department of City Planning, the building has a gross floor area of 73,444 square feet (6,823.2 m^{2}) and has 46 units, of which 10 are zoned for residential use.

== History ==
Cooperative apartment housing in New York City became popular in the late 19th century because of overcrowded housing conditions in the city's dense urban areas. When 140 West 57th Street was constructed, there were some co-ops in the city that catered specifically to artists, including the Bryant Park Studios and the Carnegie Studios, but these were almost always fully occupied and did not provide adequate space for artists to both live and work. The 67th Street Studios, constructed between 1901 and 1903 at 23–29 West 67th Street in what later became the West 67th Street Artists' Colony near Central Park, were the first artists' cooperatives in the city that were also specifically designed to provide duplex working and living areas for artists. The success of the 67th Street Studios prompted the development of other artists' studios in that area.

=== Artists' studios ===
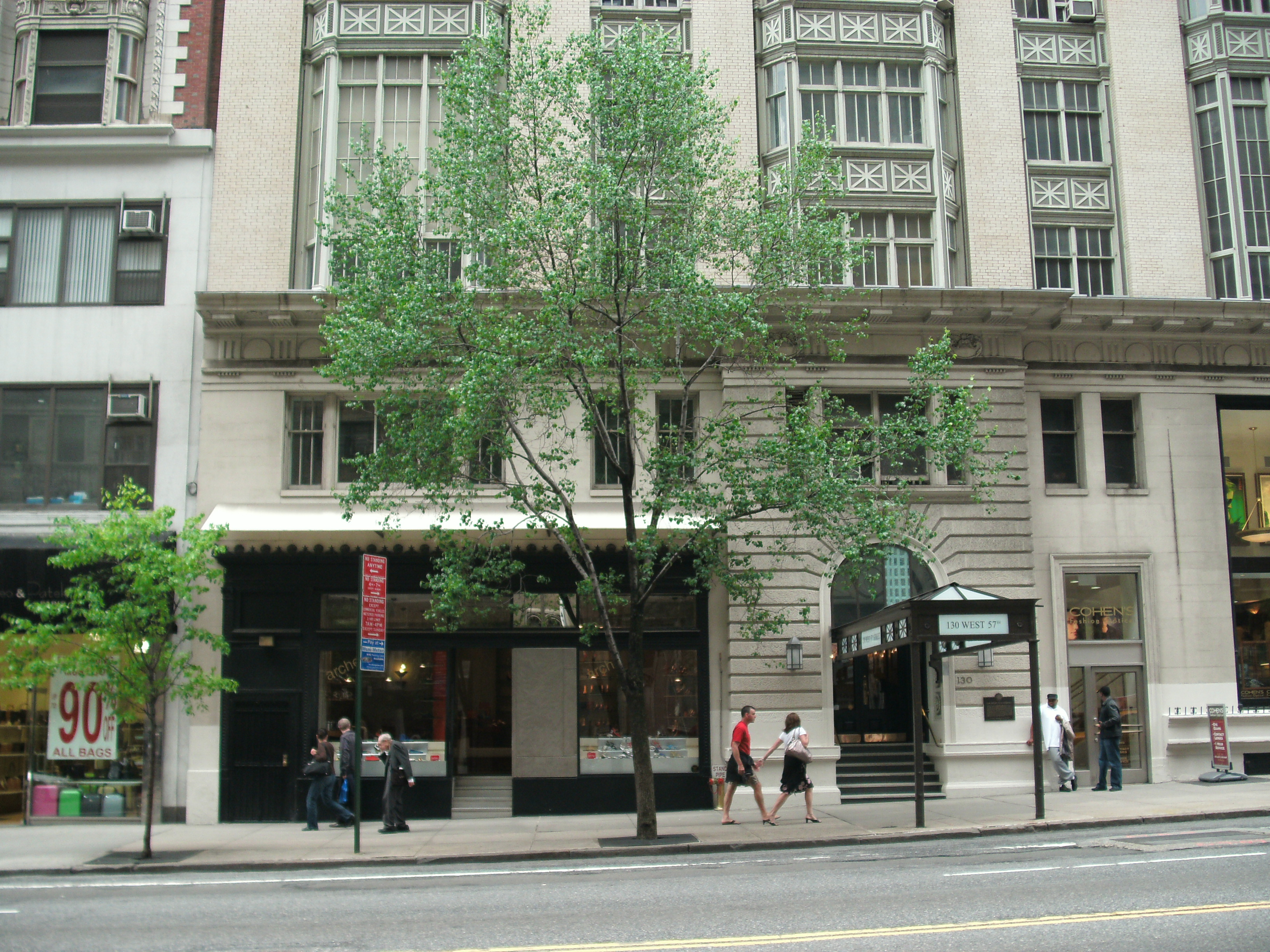
Studio building entrance

Robert Vonnoh, an artist residing in one of the 67th Street Studios, bought four brownstone townhouses at 126–132 West 57th Street in early 1907. Ownership of the brownstones was transferred to the 130 West 57th Street Corporation that June. The corporation was operated by president Walter G. Merritt and secretary Payson McL. Merrill. Pollard and Steinam were hired to design a $500,000 apartment house at the site, with seven double-height stories in the front and twelve single-height stories in the rear. The architects were also hired for the nearly identical, adjacent development at 140 West 57th Street, developed by the same individuals. Building permits for 130 West 57th Street were filed with the New York City Department of Buildings in September 1907. The construction contract was awarded to William J. Taylor, and funded with a $475,000 loan from the Metropolitan Life Insurance Company. The building was completed in October 1908.

Although marketed as artists' studios, 130 West 57th Street was also home to lawyers, stock brokers, teachers, and other professionals. The novelist William Dean Howells lived in the building; his son, architect John Mead Howells, also resided there until 1927. William Dean Howells's firm Howells & Stokes designed a basement store one year after the building's completion. Another resident, painter Childe Hassam, sometimes depicted the building's trapezoidal windows in his Impressionist paintings. Marion Wilson, the spouse of Richard Thornton Wilson Jr., also lived at 130 West 57th Street; her late-night parties prompted Hassam and other residents to unsuccessfully file nuisance complaints against her. The building's basement store was removed in 1922 and the entrance staircases were recessed as part of a project to widen West 57th Street. The facade otherwise saw few modifications during the 20th century, except for the installation of ground story storefronts.

=== Later use ===
The building was converted to a rental apartment in 1937, and Met Life bought 130 West 57th Street at auction the next year for $300,000. Paul S. Hitlin bought the building in 1945, and ownership subsequently passed to Abram Jedwabnik. Upon Abram's death four years later, his brother David, who lived at 130 West 57th Street with his wife and daughter, continued to operate the building.

Through the mid-20th century, tenants at 130 West 57th Street included Ray Charles, The Rolling Stones, and the studios of Woody Allen's production company. The singer Tony Bennett also lived in the building, on the ninth floor. During the 1970s, the ground-floor retail space housed a restaurant called the Irish Pavilion, named after a pavilion at the 1964 New York World's Fair. David Jedwabnik's daughter Mira Van Doren, along with her son Daniel, started managing the building in the 1980s, and renovated the hallways and mosaic tiles in the 1990s. Planet Hollywood opened a location at 140 West 57th Street's base in 1991, and the Motown Cafe and Planet Hollywood's Merch Shop occupied the storefronts at 130 and 140 West 57th Street. The New York City Landmarks Preservation Commission (LPC) designated 130 West 57th Street as an official city landmark on October 19, 1999.

The building was largely used by office tenants by 2000, when there were only seven residential tenants in 55 total units. The Planet Hollywood at the building's base had closed by late 2000, when the restaurant moved to Times Square. In February 2016, H. Huntsman & Sons opened a location at 130 West 57th Street, becoming the first tailor from London's Savile Row to open a permanent location in New York.

== See also ==
- List of New York City Designated Landmarks in Manhattan from 14th to 59th Streets
