= 165 West 57th Street =

Building in Manhattan, New York

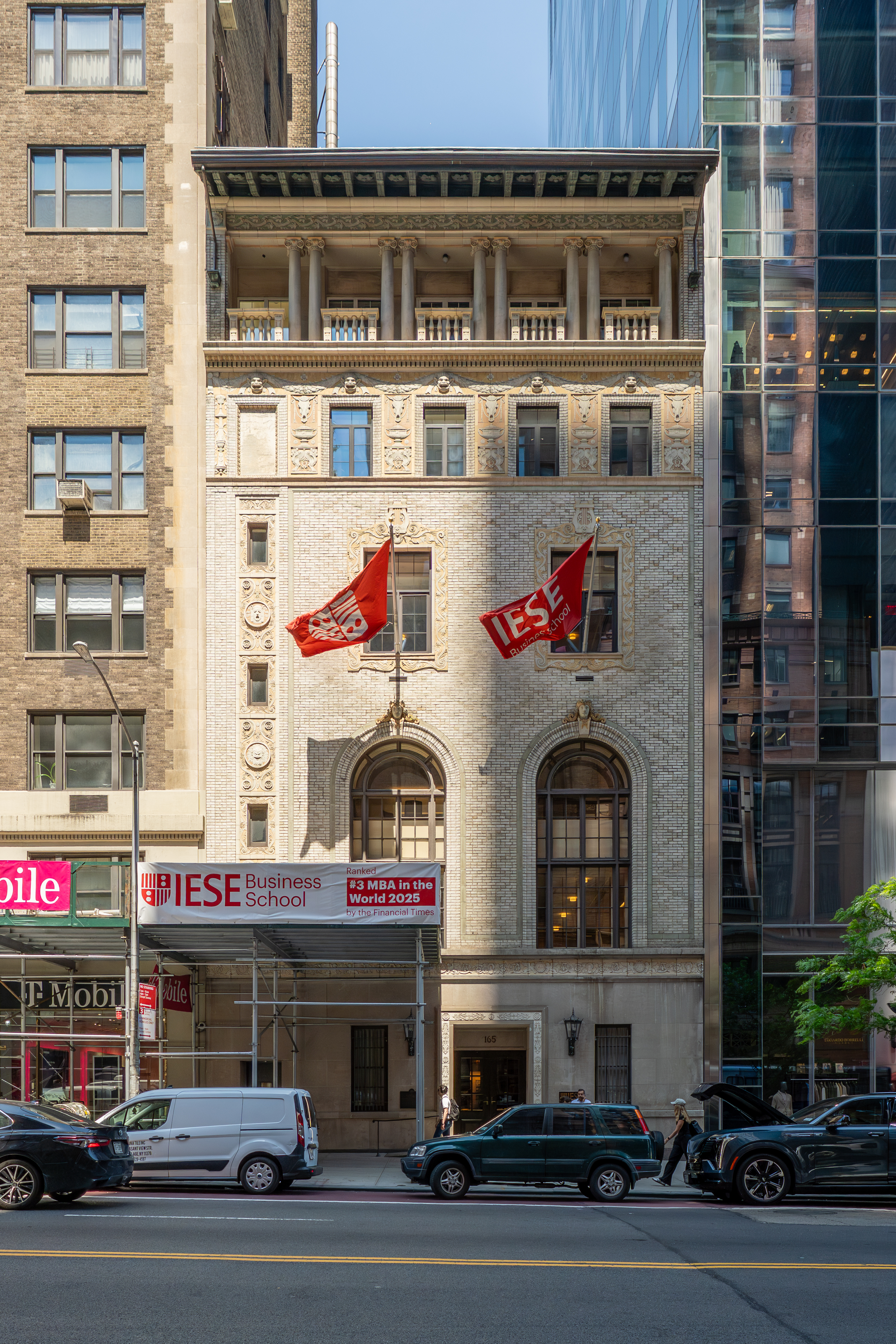
- Seen in 2011 with a banner for IESE Business School on the scaffolding
- Interactive map of the 165 West 57th Street area
- Alternative names: Louis H. Chalif Normal School of Dancing, CAMI Building

General information
- Location: 163–165 West 57th Street, Manhattan, New York, US
- Coordinates: 40°45′56″N 73°58′45″W
- Current tenants: IESE Business School
- Construction started: 1914
- Completed: 1916
- Client: Louis H. Chalif Normal School of Dancing

Technical details
- Floor count: 5

Design and construction
- Architects: George A. and Henry Boehm
- Main contractor: Murphy Construction Company

New York City Landmark
- Designated: October 19, 1999
- Reference no.: 2041

165 West 57th Street, originally the Louis H. Chalif Normal School of Dancing headquarters, is a building in the Midtown Manhattan neighborhood of New York City. It is along the northern sidewalk of 57th Street between Sixth Avenue and Seventh Avenue. The five-story building was designed by George A. and Henry Boehm for dance instructor Louis H. Chalif. It was designed as an event space, a school, and Chalif's apartment.

165 West 57th Street has an asymmetrical facade. The original ground story was originally built with ivory-colored Dover marble but was later refaced with limestone. At the second and third stories, the facade contains a diagonal pattern resembling a diamond, with terracotta molding. Inside were a ballroom at the second story (later known as the Carl Fischer Hall, Judson Hall, or CAMI Hall) and a dining area at the third story. The fourth floor has terracotta panels and windows; it was originally used as Chalif's family residence. The fifth floor, used as an event space, has a loggia behind a colonnade. The building is topped by an overhanging cornice and an asphalt roof.

Construction started in 1914 and was completed in 1916. The building was occupied by the Louis H. Chalif Normal School of Dancing until 1932 or 1933. Three clients were listed as occupying the building until 1937, after which it remained vacant for five years. The Federation of Crippled and Disabled moved its headquarters to the building in 1943 and operated there for several years. Carl Fischer Music acquired the building in 1946 and had a shop and performance hall there until 1959, when it was sold to Columbia Artists Management Inc (CAMI). The New York City Landmarks Preservation Commission designated 165 West 57th Street as a city landmark in 1999. It was sold to the Clover Foundation in 2007 and has been occupied by IESE Business School since then.

== Site ==
165 West 57th Street is on the north side of 57th Street between Sixth Avenue and Seventh Avenue, two blocks south of Central Park, in the Midtown Manhattan neighborhood of New York City. The site covers 3,930 square feet (365 m^{2}), with a width of 39.83 feet (12 m) on 57th Street and a depth of 100 feet (30 m).

165 West 57th Street shares a city block with The Briarcliffe to the west, the Alwyn Court to the northwest, and One57, the Nippon Club Tower, the Calvary Baptist Church, and 111 West 57th Street to the east. It is also near the Saint Thomas Choir School to the northwest; the American Fine Arts Society (also known as the Art Students League of New York building) and the Osborne Apartments to the west; the Rodin Studios to the southwest; Carnegie Hall and Carnegie Hall Tower to the south; and Russian Tea Room, Metropolitan Tower, and 130 and 140 West 57th Street to the southeast. 165 West 57th Street is part of an artistic hub that developed around West 57th Street between Sixth Avenue and Broadway during the late 19th and early 20th centuries, following the opening of Carnegie Hall in 1891.

== Architecture ==
The Louis H. Chalif Normal School of Dancing building at 165 West 57th Street was designed by George A. and Henry Boehm. It was developed for Russian-born dance instructor Louis H. Chalif, founder of the Louis H. Chalif Normal School of Dancing. The school, one of the first in the United States to train dance instructors, taught children and amateur dancers as well. The building's exterior design generally reflects the original layout of the interior. As built, it had a first-floor reception area, a second-floor ballroom, a third-floor banquet hall, a fourth-floor living space for Chalif's family, and a fifth-floor gymnasium and solarium.

The Murphy Construction Company was the general contractor and S. C. Weiskopf was the structural steel contractor. The subcontractors included foundation contractor R. D. Coombs & Co., elevator supplier Otis Elevator Co., exterior marble contractor B. A. & G. N. Williams, terracotta contractor Federal Terra Cotta Co., plastering contractor P. J. Durcan Inc., and interior marble contractor McLaury Tile & Marble Corporation. In addition, Empire City-Gerard Co. performed the trim and cabinet work, Liberty Sheet Metal Works installed the copper roofing and skylights, Standard Arch Co. installed the fireproof floor arches, American Kalamein Works Inc. installed the kalamein doors and windows, and Lieberman & Sanford Co. was responsible for ornamental iron work. The plumbing was installed by Charles H. Darmstadt, steam heating by Reis & O'Donovan Inc., and ventilation and electrical installation by Reis & O'Donovan Inc.

=== Facade ===
The street facade of 165 West 57th Street is designed with elements of Mannerism and the Italian Renaissance styles. The facade was designed with marble at its first story and buff brick with polychrome terracotta at the upper stories. The fifth story has a loggia made of marble, as well as an overhanging cornice. The street facade is asymmetrical, being divided into five vertical bays at the fourth and fifth stories. On the first through third stories, the section corresponding to the westernmost bay is designed differently from the portion corresponding to the four other bays, which is largely symmetrical on these stories. There were windows on the side facades, The terracotta decorations contain classical Greek and Roman motifs, some of which relate to theater.

==== Ground story ====
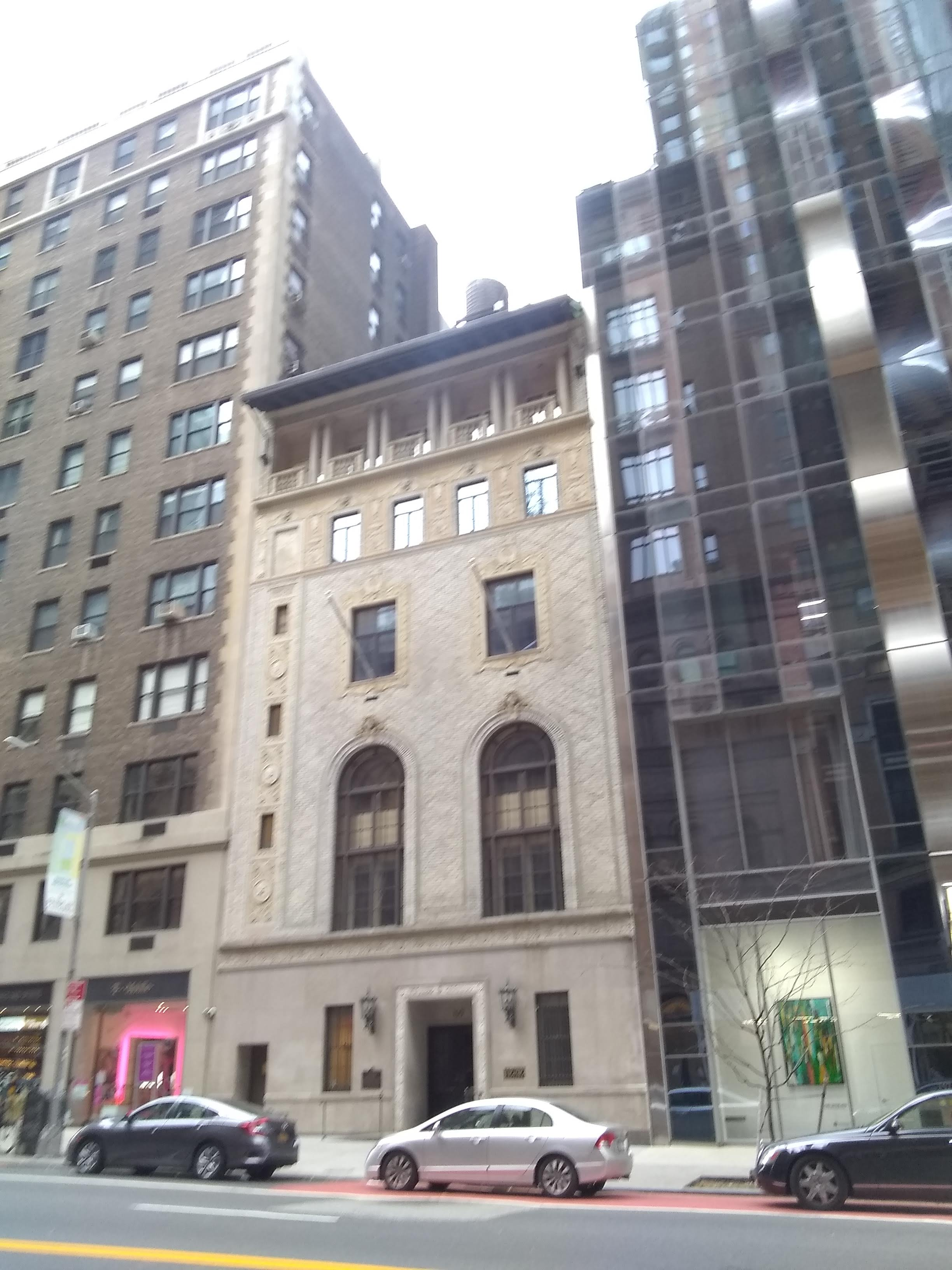
Chalif's school on 165 West 57th Street, seen in 2020

The ground story was originally built with ivory-colored Dover marble. A horizontal band course of terracotta ran above it. In its initial design, there were two windows from the raised basement, which had iron grilles in front of them. A marble step led to the entrance, which was slightly offset. The entrance consisted of a pair of recessed wooden doors, above which was a transom and letters spelling Chalif's name. The doorway was flanked by gray-green scones, which were subsequently removed and taken to the Central Park Zoo. On each side of the entrance was a window. The westernmost section of the facade had an additional recessed service doorway at ground level and a small window at the height of the band course.

The existing ground story dates from 1983 and is similar in design to the original. The current base is made of Indiana limestone and has a band of polished granite at its base. In addition, there is a polished-granite ramp and step leading to the center doorway, and the sconces flanking the main entrance are darker in color. The band course above the top story is also made of terracotta but has no window interrupting it.

==== Upper stories ====
There is tan-gray brick cladding at the second and third stories, which is laid in a diagonal pattern resembling a diamond. The wall bricks were originally installed in blue, cream, and gray-green hues, while the terracotta was cream and yellow. The westernmost bay of those stories has terracotta panels and three window openings. To the east (right) of that bay, the second story has a pair of round-arched windows surrounded by brick and terracotta, with carvings of female heads above them. These windows were originally casement windows with multiple panes, but they were replaced with single-pane windows. The third story has a pair of rectangular windows surrounded by terracotta frames, with louvers below the windows and lyres above them. There are flagpoles below these two third-story windows.

The fourth story has five window openings, though the westernmost opening is a blind opening with marble inside it. There are carved terracotta panels between each set of windows. Above the fourth story is a terracotta frieze containing depictions of swags and masks, as well as a denticulated cornice. The fourth floor panels were designed with an orange background.

There is a loggia on the fifth story, which contains a colonnade of several paired columns and a solitary column on the far east. The bases and the Ionic-style capitals of the columns are made of terracotta, while the rest of the columns are coated in concrete. There is a terracotta balustrade interspersed with the columns' bases. Above these columns is a frieze made of terracotta. On the loggia behind the colonnade are French doors, as well as a ceiling containing three light bulbs. Projecting from the top of the loggia is a sloped copper cornice that contains modillions and rosettes. Above the cornice are a metal railing, a gutter, an asphalt-tile pitched roof, and chimneys. As designed, the roof had green Spanish tiles, a skylight, and iron grilles and lanterns.

=== Features ===
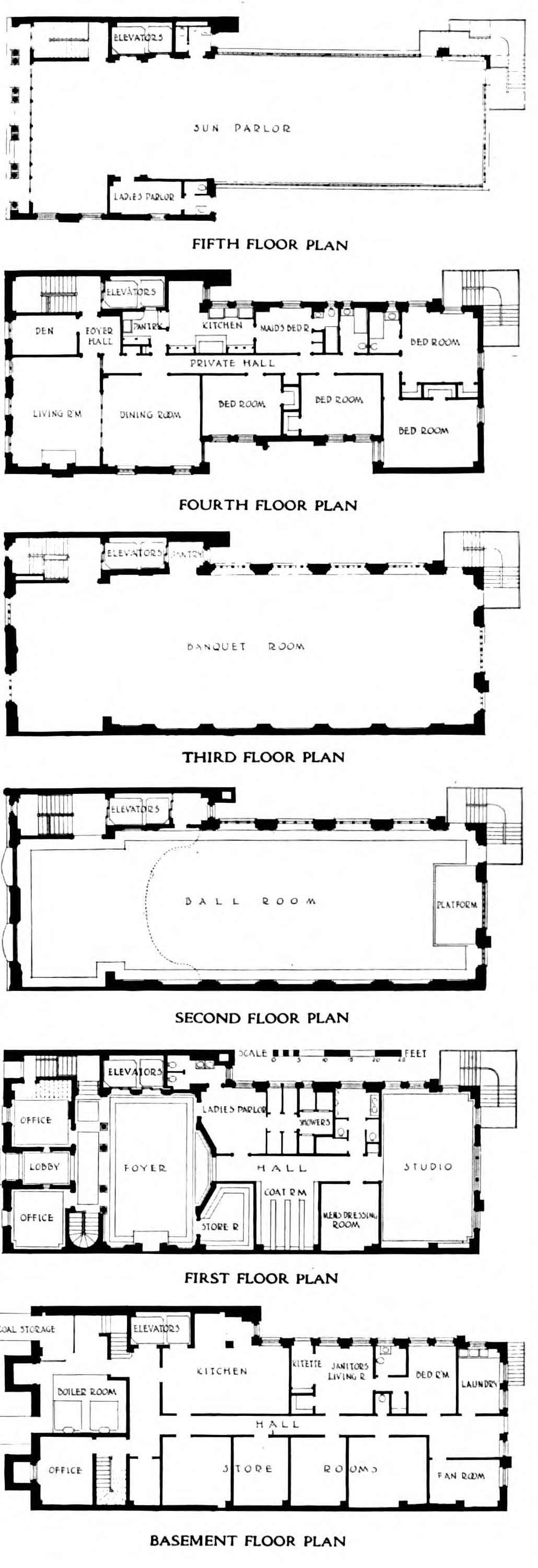
Floor plans

The interior structure was designed with fireproof material. The superstructure is constructed in such a manner that two extra stories could be added if there was a need for more space. The structure was initially heated by steam and ventilated by a system of intake and exhaust fans, including a rooftop exhaust fan. Two electric elevators serving all floors were installed: one for passengers and the other for service. The building also had an interior staircase and an enclosed exterior fire escape in case of emergency. The asymmetrical arrangement of the facade reflected the fact that the elevators and staircase were on the western wall of the building.

The building was intended to allow the Louis H. Chalif Normal School of Dancing to host classes and periodical exhibitions, as well as summer classes for dance teachers. In addition, an apartment for the Chalif family was provided in the design. As a result, the second and third floors were designed with few columns in the center of the space. The building was also designed so it could be rented for private social functions. For the decorations of the interior, cast ornamental plaster and paint were used frequently, but wood was used sparingly except in the ground-floor foyers. The wall hangings and furniture were designed to fit in with the color schemes. Crystal chandeliers provided artificial light. The ballrooms were planned with parquet floors and 23-foot (7.0 m) ceilings.

When it was used by the Chalif School, the ground floor had a large wooden reception foyer, which led to the stairs and elevators. Also at ground level were offices, a coat room, dressing rooms, bathrooms with four shower baths, and a large studio. The second floor was devoted to the grand ballroom, with a mezzanine gallery at the south end. The third floor included a banquet hall, where a pantry connected to the basement kitchen via a service elevator. The fourth floor had the living apartments of the Chalif family. Chalif's apartment was planned as a nine-room apartment with three bathrooms and housekeeping. The Real Estate Record and Guide described it as having "all of the features now to be found in apartments of the highest type." The gymnasium floor at the top was a glass-enclosed space used by the summer school, with an open steel-trussed roof. It could be enclosed in winter and open on all sides in summer, and it was meant to be used for social functions and recreation.

== History ==
In 1905, Louis Chalif opened the Louis H. Chalif Normal School of Dancing. The school was initially situated on the Upper West Side and then at 360 Fifth Avenue inside the Aeolian Company's showroom. At the school, one of the first in the United States to train dance instructors, Chalif also taught children and amateur dancers. In 1907, the school relocated to the Aeolian Building at 7 West 42nd Street.

=== Construction ===
In October 1914. Chalif purchased a 21-by-100-foot (6.4 by 30.5 m) lot at 165 West 57th Street from Louis de Bebian. At the time, the lot contained a four-story dwelling. Chalif acquired the adjacent 19-by-100-foot (5.8 by 30.5 m) lot at 163 West 57th Street, which also contained a four-story dwelling, from the Wilmurt Realty Company in May 1915. The two lots gave Chalif a combined frontage of nearly 40 feet (12 m) on 57th Street. Chalif had selected the site because it was convenient for pupils. The Sun described the building that August as "a Temple of Terpsichore".

George and Henry Boehm had been hired to design a building for the Chalif school by that August. The Boehms had probably become involved with Chalif in 1907, when George Boehm had designed a building for the Acker, Merrall & Condit Company on 42nd Street, next to the Chalif School. The architects identified seven terracotta firms, consisting of three manufacturers and four modelers, to manufacture the building's terracotta in November 1915, and exact details of the terracotta were finalized later. Susan Tunick, an expert on terracotta, stated that an unusually large amount of documentation still existed about the terracotta contracting process. The architects submitted plans to the New York City Department of Buildings in December 1915. The site was cleared starting in January 1916 and work began that April. The building's construction was completed by that December.

=== 1910s to 1940s ===
The building sometimes served as an event space in its early years. In 1918, the building hosted an event for the Red Cross Institute for Crippled and Disabled Men after the original hosts, Daniel Webster Herrman and his wife, could not accommodate all the guests at their house. The building also hosted a meeting for the Women's Freedom Congress in 1919, as well as the Roosevelt Anniversary Ball and a dance for the Semper Fidelis Post's female marines in 1921. The school had a beginner course for delegates to the Democratic National Convention in 1924. The building also hosted the 21st birthday celebration of Dutch princess Juliana of the Netherlands in 1930, and the weddings of Louis's daughter Helen in 1928 and 1934. Other events included a 1929 performance by a group of instrumental orchestra performers, as well as sermons given by minister Charles Francis Potter in 1929 and 1930. Chalif's son Amos, who grew up in the building, said it had been "a wonderful place to grow up", as he learned to ride a bicycle there with his brother Selmer accompanying him.

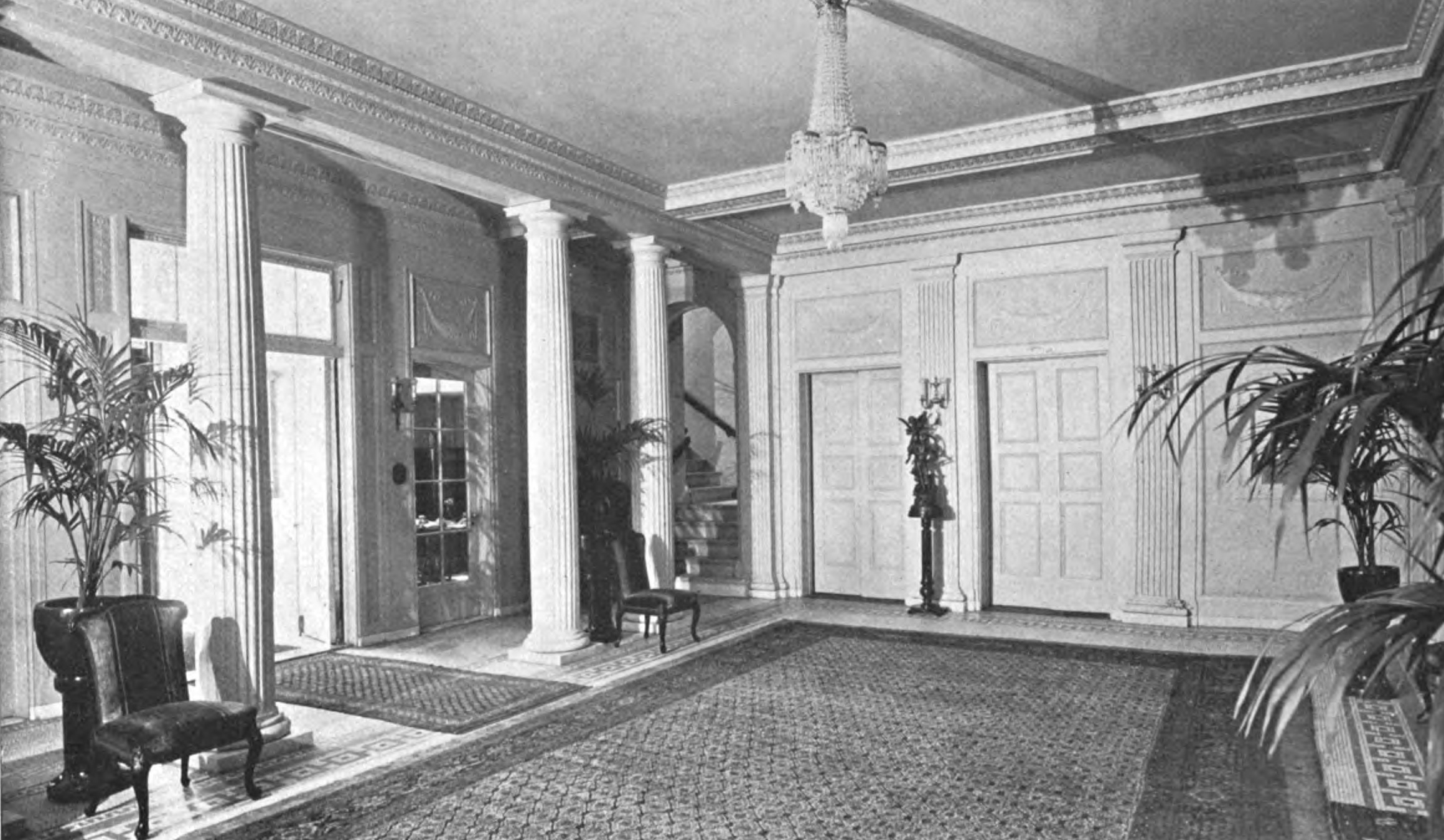
Entrance foyer

Galy Russian Art Gowns moved into the building in 1930. The Chalif School had moved out of the building by 1932 or 1933. In October 1934, the Harlem Savings Bank took over the building through foreclosure. Amos Chalif said the bank providing a mortgage loan for the building and several nearby structures had gone bankrupt. Afterward, the building was occupied by Galy Russian Art Gowns, as well as the Vanity Fair Theater Restaurant and Georgian Hall. These tenants had moved out by 1937 and the building remained empty for the next five years. Documents from February 1939 indicate that the Harlem Savings Bank was planning to convert the second story into a 222-seat auditorium. At the same time, an arcade with an iron balcony was installed at the ground story.

The Federation of Crippled and Disabled bought the building in September 1942 and moved its headquarters to the building in January 1943. That December, the New York state government sued to disband the organization as fraudulent, accusing the officers and directors of using disabled persons solely for fundraising. The disbanding was averted the next year when the federation was reorganized. Carl Fischer Music acquired the building in February 1946. The Federation of Crippled and Disabled continued to occupy the building for some time. In 1947, five disabled students taking classed with the federation became the first-ever palsy and paralysis victims to receive diplomas from the New York City public school system. A Carl Fischer music store opened in the building in May 1948. The Carl Fischer Concert Hall on the second floor opened the same October.

=== 1950s to present ===
Through the 1950s, the concert hall and the "Sky Room" at 165 West 57th Street held various musical performances and recitals. The musical programming at the hall was directed by Eric Simon, who invited composers such as Benjamin Britten and John Cage to perform there. Other events included a series of lectures by the Fashion Group Inc. in 1950, as well as a showcase in 1956 for performers who completed a two-year course with the American Theatre Wing. In 1959, Carl Fischer sold the building to Columbia Artists Management Inc (CAMI). The Fischer company planned to move to Cooper Square and Columbia Artists was relocating from the nearby Steinway Hall. CAMI hired William Lescaze to remodel portions of the building, including at the ground story, where red mosaic tiles and new signage were added. At the time, Carnegie Hall was being proposed for demolition, and CAMI officials believed 165 West 57th Street would become an important music venue with the demolition of Carnegie Hall.

CAMI moved into the building in 1960 and the Carl Fischer Concert Hall was renamed the Judson Hall. The renovated 275-seat auditorium was named for musician Arthur Judson and formally reopened in October 1960. Further work on the building continued until 1963. Shortly afterward, Arthur Judson decided to leave CAMI, and he requested that his name be removed from the concert hall. Accordingly, the hall was renamed CAMI Hall. An advertisement from 1964 advertised the hall as being available for rent for private functions from 8 to 11 p.m. for $125 per night (equivalent to $1,298 in 2025). CAMI hired Marlo & De Chiara in 1983 to redesign the ground-story exterior to resemble the original appearance. The Polonia Restoration Company conducted the reconstruction. CAMI moved its Community Concerts division from the building in 1990. The building served many of CAMI's late-20th-century clients. Ronald A. Wilford, president of CAMI in the 1990s, was quoted in The New York Times as "cast[ing] a long shadow from the music canyon of West 57th Street".

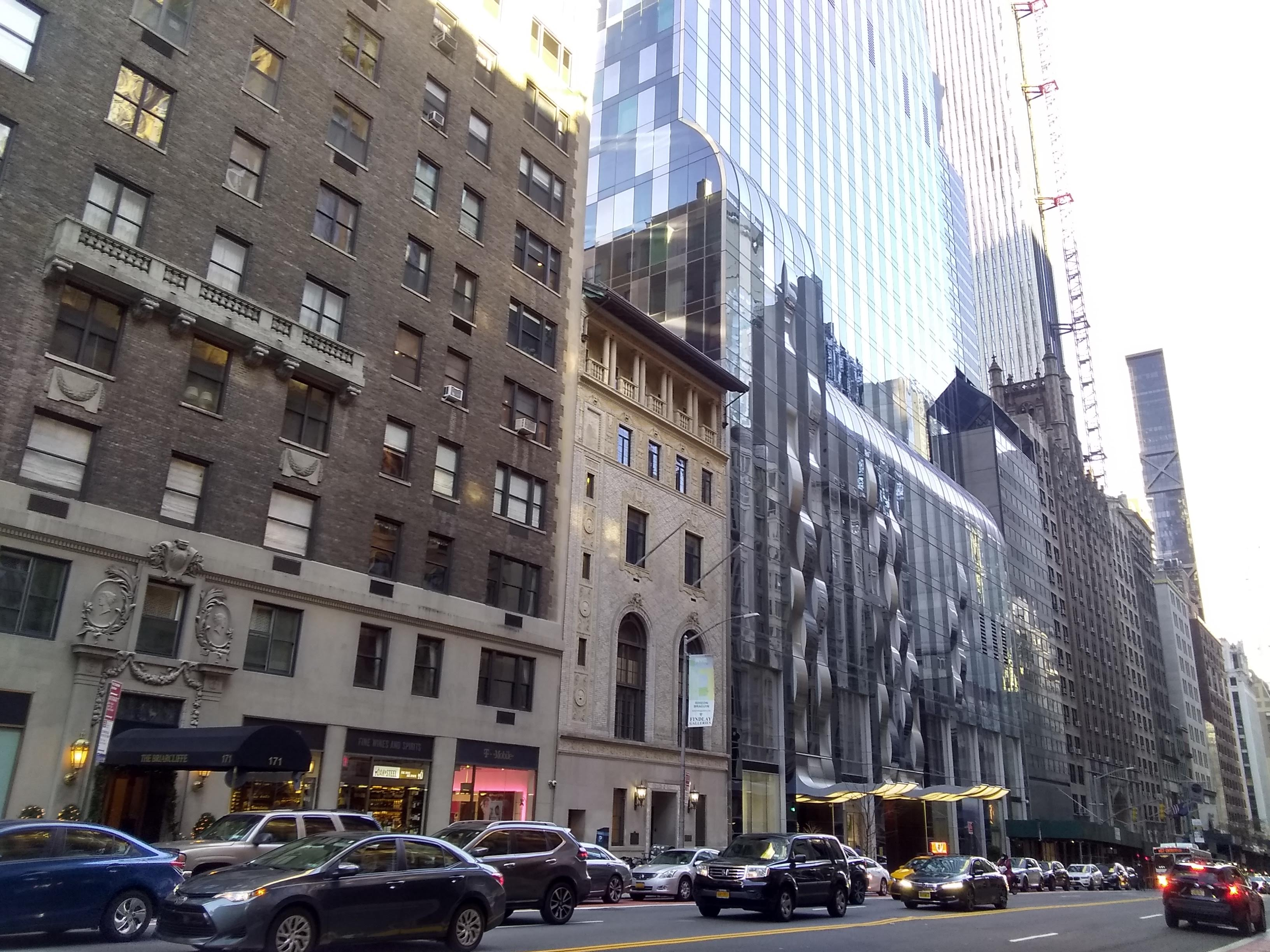
Viewed from Seventh Avenue, with One57 immediately behind it

The New York City Landmarks Preservation Commission designated 165 West 57th Street as a city landmark on October 17, 1999. At the time, Extell Development Company president Gary Barnett was acquiring several nearby plots to build a residential skyscraper, which would later become One57. By 2002, Barnett had acquired the air rights over 165 West 57th Street to develop his skyscraper. At the time, the second-story recital hall was described as having 168 seats. CAMI moved to 1790 Broadway in 2005, and 165 West 57th Street was placed on sale for $20 million in 2006. The building was purchased by the Clover Foundation in 2007. The same year, IESE Business School opened its New York City campus in the building. IESE continues to occupy 165 West 57th Street as of 2021.

== Critical reception ==
When it was completed, 165 West 57th Street was described by the Real Estate Record and Guide as being in a "purely modern style". The Real Estate Record stated, "The facade will add considerable interest to the locality in which it is being erected." Some architectural publications focused on the use of multiple colors of terracotta and brick. Architectural Forum characterized the upper stories' facade as having a "rich, cool color", with the terracotta "adding warmth to the color scheme without strong contrast". A brochure from the National Terra Cotta Society described the building as having "a very successful polychrome treatment" that contributed to the overall facade's "beautiful harmony", and Good Furniture & Decoration characterized the building as having "a golden charm that is all its own". According to architectural writer Robert A. M. Stern, the "Tuscan overtones" of the design "responded with refinement to the less tutored Italianate vocabulary of Carnegie Hall". The AIA Guide to New York City also cited the building's Tuscan design details.

165 West 57th Street was also shown in exhibits and publications. When it was completed, Architectural Forum and Architecture and Building magazines both published images of the building. The Boehms showed a model of the Chalif School building during the 1921 Paris Salon. The same year, in his textbook about Russian pageants and dancing, Chalif advertised the building as being "unparalleled for its purposes in America" as well as "striking evidence" of the school's success. The National Cyclopaedia of American Biography of 1927 called the school "a surprisingly beautiful building". An early 1930s catalog for the Chalif School advertised the building as being a "spacious and beautiful" dancing facility that received many architectural accolades.

In 1949, after Chalif's death, Dance Magazine characterized the building as "the greatest highlight and dream of Chalif's lifetime", noting that Chalif would walk past the building even after other parties had purchased it. Amos Chalif stated in the 2000s that he also walked past his father's school building often. The New York Times described the building as a "sumptuous dancing school" in 1999.

== See also ==
- List of New York City Designated Landmarks in Manhattan from 14th to 59th Streets
