= Metropolitan Tower (Manhattan) =

Skyscraper in Manhattan, New York

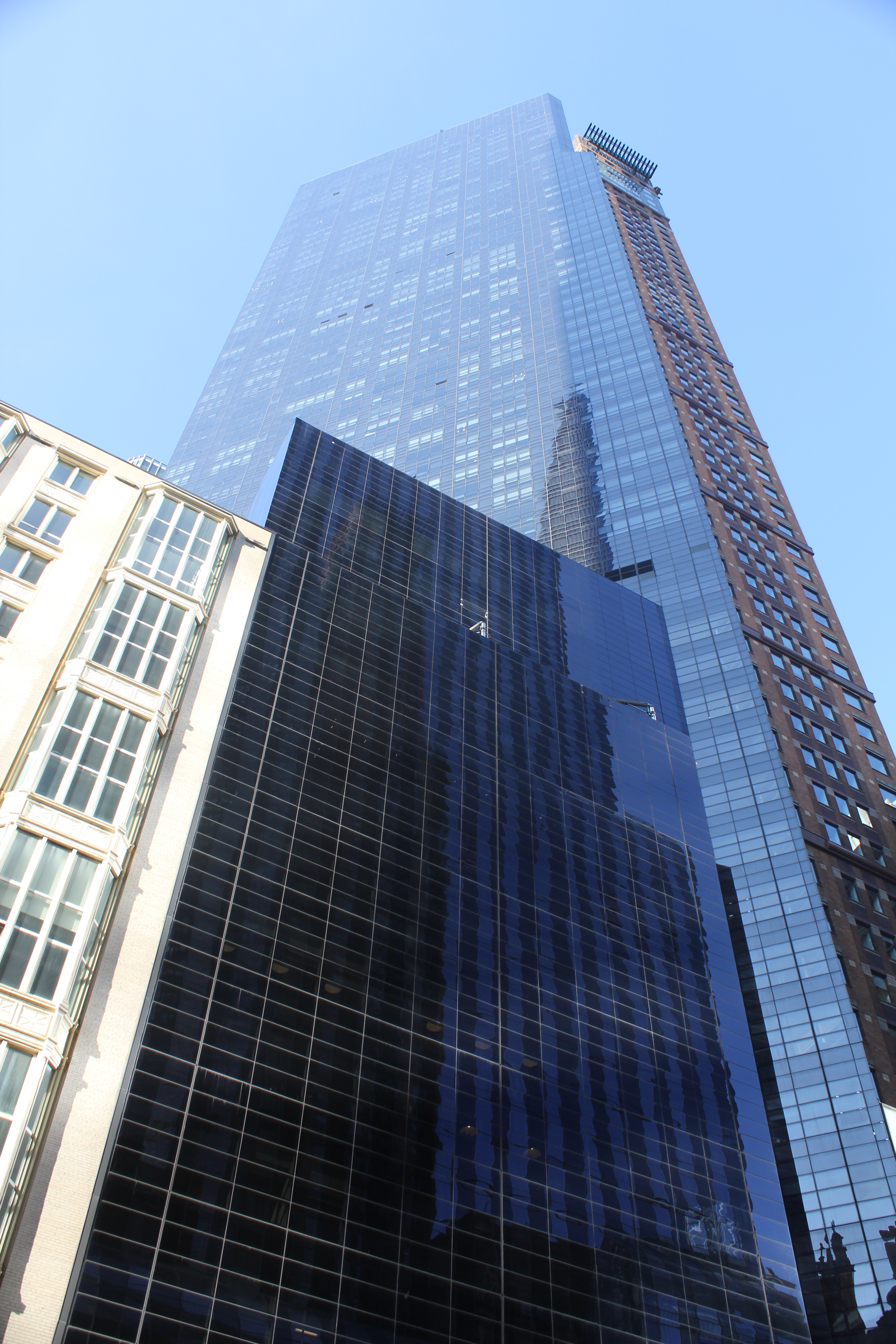

General information
- Type: Office, residential condominiums
- Architectural style: Postmodern
- Location: 146 West 57th Street, Manhattan, New York
- Coordinates: 40°45′53″N 73°58′45″W
- Construction started: 1982
- Topped-out: October 2, 1985
- Completed: 1987
- Owner: GDS Development Management and Sabal Investment Holdings (offices) condominium owners (residences)

Height
- Roof: 716 ft (218 m)
- Top floor: 77

Technical details
- Floor count: 68

Design and construction
- Architect: Schuman, Lichtenstein, Claman & Efron
- Developer: Macklowe Properties
- Main contractor: HRH Construction

Metropolitan Tower is a mixed-use skyscraper at 146 West 57th Street in the Midtown Manhattan neighborhood of New York City. Completed in 1987 and designed by SLCE Architects, the building measures 716 ft (218 m) tall with 68 stories. Metropolitan Tower is designed with a black-glass facade, with a rectangular 18-story base topped by a 48-story triangular tower. It was developed by Harry Macklowe.

Metropolitan Tower is next to Carnegie Hall Tower, separated from it only by the Russian Tea Room. The building has entrances at 57th and 56th Streets, connected by a passageway that forms part of 6½ Avenue. The base contains about 225,000 ft^{2} (20,900 m^{2}) of office space, with a triple-height mechanical area at the top. The office stories are owned as a single condominium, as are each of the 235 residential apartments in the upper stories. The residential tower resembles a right triangle in form, with a pointed edge facing north on 57th Street. Because of the high ceilings of the office stories, several floor numbers are skipped and the highest floor is numbered 78.

The site of Metropolitan Tower was occupied by low-rise buildings until 1982, when they were acquired by the Feinberg Realty and Construction Company and then Macklowe's company Macklowe Properties. Though Macklowe also tried to acquire what later became Carnegie Hall Tower's site, he was unable to obtain the Russian Tea Room between them. Construction began in 1984, and the residences were marketed to wealthy buyers after the building was completed. The office condominium has changed ownership several times in Metropolitan Tower's history. As of 2024, the offices are owned by GDS Development Management and Sabal Investment Holdings.

== Site ==
Metropolitan Tower is at 146 West 57th Street, between Sixth Avenue and Seventh Avenue two blocks south of Central Park, in the Midtown Manhattan neighborhood of New York City. The building's land lot covers 18,577 ft^{2} (1,725.9 m^{2}), has a frontage of 85 ft (26 m) along 57th Street, and is 200 ft (61 m) deep.

The building shares the city block with Russian Tea Room, Carnegie Hall, and Carnegie Hall Tower to the west, as well as 130 and 140 West 57th Street and the Parker New York hotel to the east. Other nearby buildings include the Louis H. Chalif Normal School of Dancing and One57 to the northwest; the Nippon Club Tower to the north; Calvary Baptist Church and 111 West 57th Street to the northeast; CitySpire and New York City Center to the south; and the 125 West 55th Street to the southeast. Metropolitan Tower and Carnegie Hall Tower are only separated by the Russian Tea Room, which is 20 ft (6.1 m) wide. When both buildings were developed in the 1980s, the Russian Tea Room's owner Faith Stewart-Gordon had refused to sell her land. While Metropolitan Tower originally had a direct northward view of Central Park, much of the view was blocked when One57 was built in the 2010s.

The neighborhood was historically part of a former artistic hub around a two-block section of West 57th Street between Sixth Avenue and Broadway. The hub had been developed during the late 19th and early 20th centuries, following the opening of Carnegie Hall. Several buildings in the area were constructed as residences for artists and musicians, such as 130 and 140 West 57th Street, the Rodin Studios, and the Osborne Apartments, as well as the demolished Sherwood Studios and Rembrandt. In addition, the area contained the headquarters of organizations such as the American Fine Arts Society, the Lotos Club, and the American Society of Civil Engineers. By the 21st century, the artistic hub had largely been replaced with Billionaires' Row, a series of luxury skyscrapers around the southern end of Central Park. The site of Metropolitan Tower was occupied by several low-rise buildings of four and five stories, including the Little Carnegie Theater, which closed in 1982.

== Architecture ==
Metropolitan Tower was designed by Schuman, Lichtenstein, Claman & Efron and was developed by Harry B. Macklowe, whose company Macklowe Properties still owns the building. Bill Derman of Polshek Partners and Sheldon Werdiger of Skidmore, Owings & Merrill were also involved in Metropolitan Tower's design. The structure was built by construction manager HRH Construction. Metropolitan Tower is 716 ft (218 m) tall with 68 stories. At the time of its completion, Metropolitan Tower was New York City's tallest residential building, as well as the city's tallest reinforced concrete building.

=== Form and facade ===
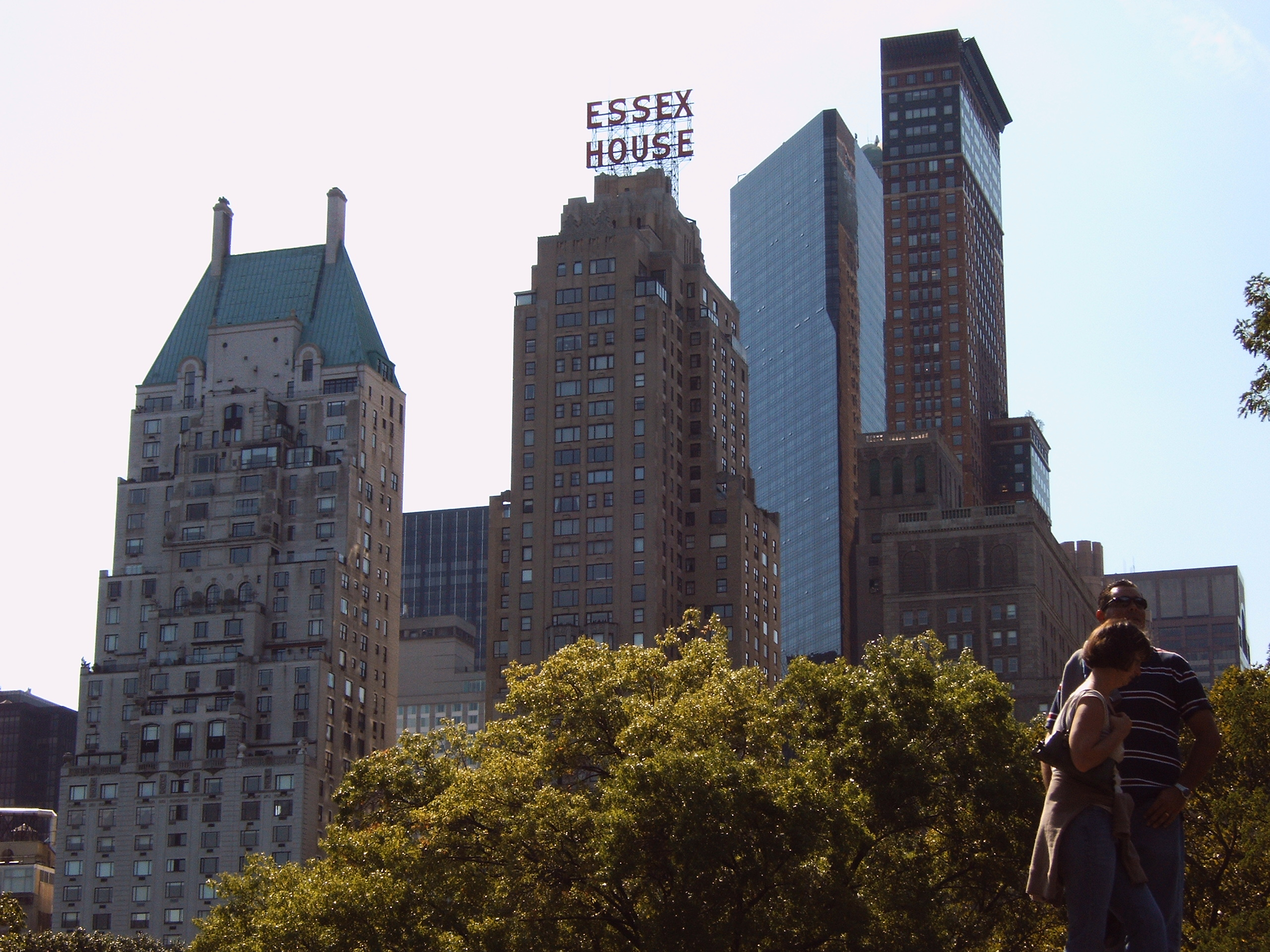
Metropolitan Tower (second from right) as viewed from Central Park. From left to right: Hampshire House, Essex House, Metropolitan Tower, Carnegie Hall Tower.

Metropolitan Tower consists of a 48-story triangular tower on top of an 18-story rectangular base. This includes a triple-height mechanical space above the base. The tower section is designed like a right triangle in plan, with its hypotenuse facing northeast. The northeast facade was meant to maximize views of both Central Park to the north and Fifth Avenue to the east. The shape was also required due to zoning restrictions on the site. Due to the proximity of other buildings, some views from Metropolitan Tower are blocked by CitySpire Center and Carnegie Hall Tower. Metropolitan Tower was built "as of right" without using special zoning provisions to allow a greater height than would be normally allowed. Metropolitan Tower does use the air rights over 140 West 57th Street, but the buildings' zoning lots were merged, so the building's site technically includes 140 West 57th Street as well.

The curtain wall panels are composed of glass panes and aluminum strips. They are designed so that, when assembled, they appear as an unbroken sheet of glass.There are 7,200 curtain-wall panels in total with 72,000 panes between them. The black glass panes measure 5 by 9 ft (1.5 by 2.7 m). The panels at the base are made of reflective glass. while those in the tower are non-reflective and contain sections that could open to allow fresh air into the upper-story apartments.

As designed, a canopy on 57th Street led to a double-height entryway with Italian-marble floors and walls, as well as a doorway with columns in a modified Doric style. The entryway was 30 feet (9.1 m) tall and was largely covered by black glass similar to the rest of the facade. There was a sidewalk canopy only in front of the residential lobby. This caused confusion for office tenants, who frequently went into the residential lobby by mistake before the doorman asked them to leave. After a renovation in 2006, a cantilevered, gabled canopy was installed in front of the office lobby.

=== Structural features ===
The foundation is on high-quality rock and uses spread footings capable of 20 short tons per square foot (195 t/m^{2}). Metropolitan Tower has a superstructure made of reinforced concrete. According to the Skyscraper Museum, this was part of a trend in which office buildings in Manhattan had steel superstructures, but residential buildings had reinforced concrete. Compared to steel, concrete was easier to mold, could reduce vibration when shaped into a large mass, and could be modified as it was being built. Overall, the tower uses 2.2 million square feet (200,000 m^{2}) of formwork, 36,000 cubic yards (28,000 m^{3}) of concrete, and 3,600 short tons (3,200 long tons; 3,300 t) of steel rebar.

Metropolitan Tower's superstructure is divided into three sections, which use different strengths of concrete. The strongest concrete is used on floors 1 through 11, followed by floors 12 through 17, with the weakest concrete on and above floor 30. The columns and shear walls in each section are stronger than the floor slabs. The strength of the concrete ranges from 4,000 pounds per square inch (28,000 kPa), for the residential slabs on and above floor 30, to 8,300 pounds per square inch (57,000 kPa), for the shear walls on and below floor 11.

At the triple-height mechanical story, labeled as floor 17, (Note: When counting the true number of stories above ground, there are only 16 stories, or 18 if the triple-height mechanical story is included. The triple-height mechanical story is labeled as floor 17, and floor number 13 is skipped.) loads from the upper stories are shifted onto columns at the lower stories. The mechanical story consists of a concrete slab with one mechanical duct embedded in it. The mechanical story contains steel reinforcing beams measuring 13 feet (4.0 m) or 15 ft (4.6 m) deep. Above the mechanical story are outriggers, which disperse the wind loads upon the building's exterior. On upper stories, Metropolitan Tower contains flat floor slabs, made of 8.5 inches (220 mm) of stone concrete. The use of thick concrete helped stabilize the building against high winds, especially as compared to steel. Because Macklowe wanted to reduce the number of columns on the perimeter, the floors are supported by shear walls and columns. The shear walls are placed perpendicularly to the northeast side of the tower, wrapping around the floor slabs in a horseshoe layout.

=== Interior ===
Though the building is physically 68 stories tall, (Note: News media sometimes count Metropolitan Tower as having 65 stories, with 17 stories in the base and 48 in the tower. Other sources have reported the building as having 66 stories, with 18 in the base and 48 in the tower. This discrepancy may arise from the floor number of the triple-height mechanical story and whether the mechanical story is counted as one.) the top floor is numbered 78. According to one of Macklowe's lawyers, this is because the base of the building has high ceilings. Macklowe said Donald Trump had inspired him to label the top floor with a higher number than the physical number of stories the building had. Floor number 13 is skipped, and floor 17 (containing mechanical equipment) is not labeled on the building's condominium offering plan. Floor numbers 18 through 29 are skipped completely. The first residential story, floor 30, would have been labeled as floor 18 under traditional counting methods and if the mechanical story was counted as one floor. The building has 653,000 square feet (60,700 m^{2}) of office, retail, and residential space in total.

==== Lobby and office stories ====
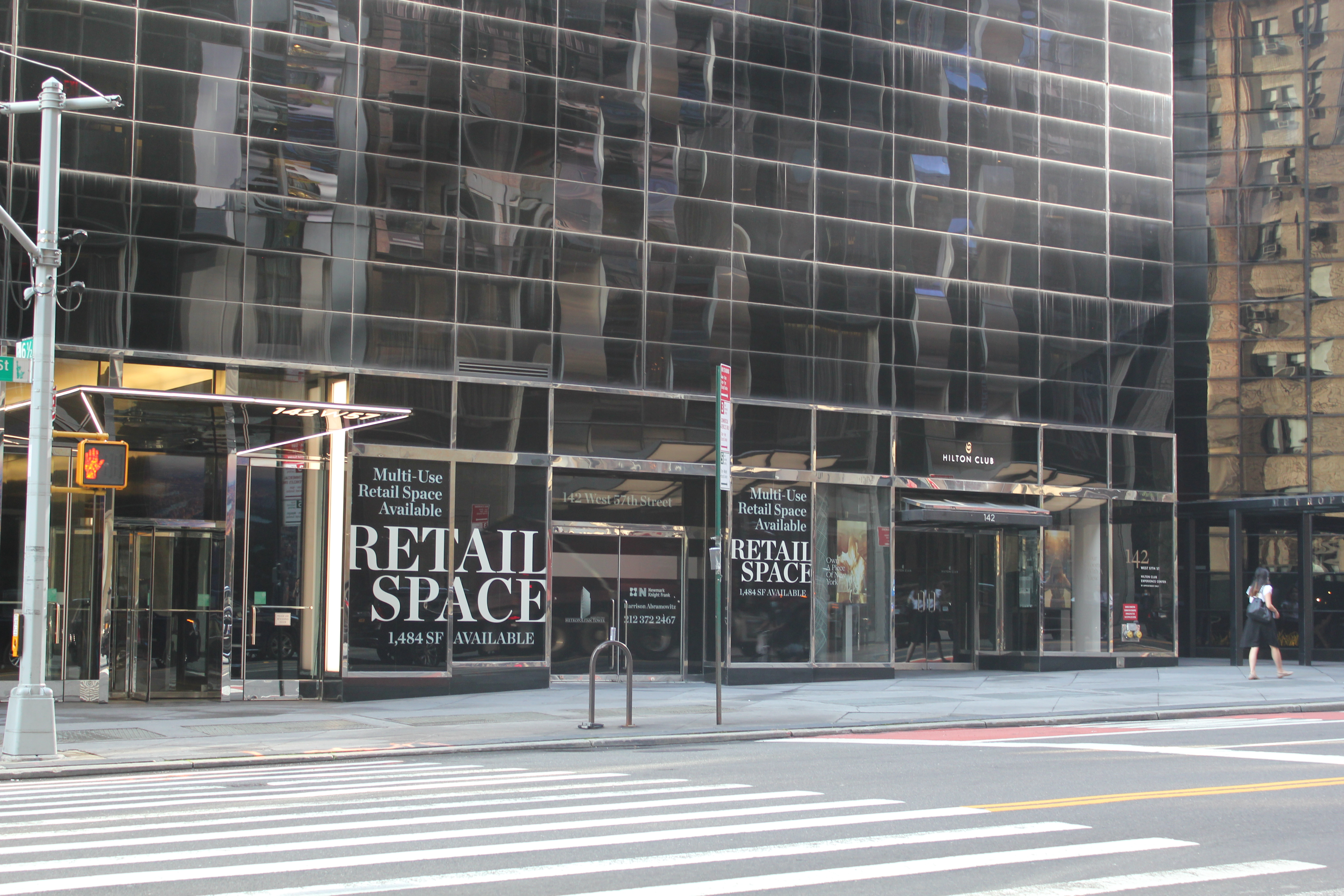
Storefront next to the full-block lobby

The building's entrances on 57th and 56th Streets are connected by a public passageway that forms part of 6½ Avenue. The passageway was built as a "through-block connection" under the Special Midtown District, created in 1982. It is the most direct route to CitySpire's passageway directly to the south, but parallel passageways exist in the Parker New York hotel to the east and Carnegie Hall Tower to the west. While the district no longer allows more than two "through-block connections" on the same block, these passageways all predate the rule modification. On the 56th Street side are a wall planter and four standalone square planters, all made of brick.

Originally, Metropolitan Tower's lobby was planned with a concierge station, as well as etched-glass doors connecting to an elevator bank. Several tapestries by Fernand Léger were used as decorations for the lobby's interior. In addition, there was a hanging light fixture made of glass and chrome, which was inspired by an early 20th-century artwork by Adolf Loos. The lobby itself had a green carpet on a black-granite floor, mohair panels on the walls, and a concierge desk with a mahogany veneer. The ground floor was designed with 5,000 ft^{2} (460 m^{2}) of retail space. During a 2006 renovation, the concierge station was relocated and replaced with a lit box that could change colors based on time of day, season, and weather. In addition, a 4 in (100 mm) LED sign, running the length of the lobby, was installed to display news, entertainment, sports, and other information. In the mid-2020s, the lobby was expanded into the adjacent retail space, and a travertine floor was installed.

The base contains about 225,000 ft^{2} (20,900 m^{2}) of office space. There are 17 stories in the base. The ceilings of each office story are 13.5 ft (4.1 m) tall, which is taller than the standard ceiling height of 9 ft (2.7 m) in residential structures in Manhattan. According to Macklowe, this made the base about as tall as a typical 30-story residential building, since what would have been the "18th floor" was more than 250 ft (76 m) above ground. There is also a tenants' amenity space, which includes a 40-person media room, studios, and a pool room.

==== Apartments ====
Metropolitan Tower was designed with 246 condominium apartments, which collectively comprise 423,000 ft^{2} (39,300 m^{2}). As of 2012, the tower has 235 condo apartments. The residential condos contain between one and five bedrooms and range from 1,000 to 4,000 ft^{2} (93 to 372 m^{2}). Most of the condominiums are apartments with one to three bedrooms, but the upper stories have duplex units, including a duplex penthouse apartment. Each apartment has an entrance foyer and walk-in closets, as well as kitchens with glazed white tile floors. The units' bathrooms are furnished with marble walls and counters, showers, whirlpool tubs, bidets, and toilets. The units also included security systems, including emergency push-buttons and video intercoms. While many apartments have rectangular rooms, the diagonal northeast facade required that some apartments have triangular bedrooms and pentagonal living and dining rooms.

Floor 35 contained four model apartments designed by Andrée Putman, Juan Pablo Molyneux, Tod Williams Billie Tsien Architects, and Gensler with different themes. Putman's "sleek continental" unit in the northern corner, which she compared to a ship's prow, was designed with blond sycamore paneling, nickel plated hardware, and bookshelves made of sandblasted glass and black-epoxy-finished steel. Williams and Tsien designed their "hip contemporary" unit with metal screens, an aluminum mesh curtain, terrazzo floors, oak furniture, and silk upholstery. Gensler's "faux cowboy" unit included furnishings from Ralph Lauren and was targeted toward corporations looking for small apartments. Molyneux's unit was designed in a "plush romantic" style.

Some apartments were modified after the tower's opening, such as a group of three units combined by Williams and Tsien, who used metal furniture, varying color schemes, and ceiling decorations to mark boundaries between rooms. A corner unit was redesigned by Steven Holl with tilted walls and an airplane screen to "accompany the acute angles of the existing plan". Yet another unit, redesigned by Juan Montoya, involved the removal of a bedroom and the addition of fluted columns, ashwood paneling, and doors that were flush with the walls.

At the time of Metropolitan Tower's completion, its residential amenities were lavish even when compared to other luxury developments. This included a private garage with a chauffeurs' waiting room, as well as a communications center with stock quote and telex machines. The building also had housekeeping, laundry, shoe-shine, package-delivery, and dry cleaning services. Metropolitan Tower's catering kitchen could make meals for large receptions or small dinners. On floor 30 is a health club and a private dining room. (Note: This is cited in Newsday as floor 31.) The dining room, Club Metropolitan, has a 40-seat capacity and is only for residents and their guests. The fitness club has a 40 ft-long (12 m) swimming pool, whirlpool, sauna, steam room, and exercise equipment. Floor 31 has fourteen apartments for residents' housekeeping staff and bodyguards, which cost $125,000 per room when Metropolitan Tower opened. On the roof was an observation deck. All of these amenities were targeted at the business executives and other frequent travelers that Metropolitan Tower sought to attract. In 2011, the penthouse rented for $18,000 per month.

== History ==
In 1982, the Feinberg Realty and Construction Company purchased 1,850 ft^{2} (172 m^{2}) of land on 57th Street and bought out tenants' leases. The tenants included the Little Carnegie Theater, which closed abruptly in mid-1982 after the acquisition. Feinberg had hired Schuman Lichtenstein & Claman to design a 350,000 ft^{2} (33,000 m^{2}) tower on the site.

=== Development ===
==== Site acquisition ====
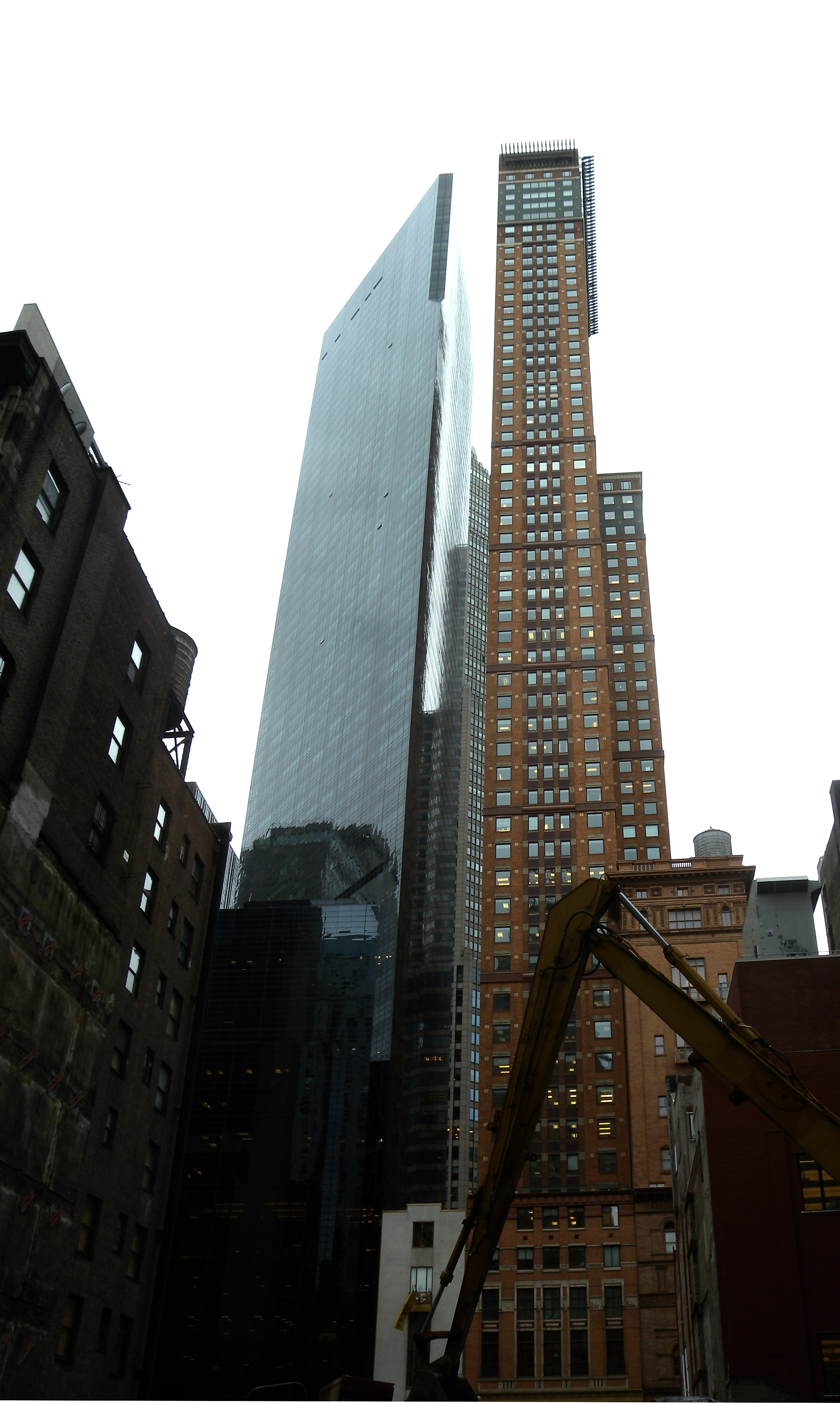
Metropolitan Tower (left) and Carnegie Hall Tower (right)

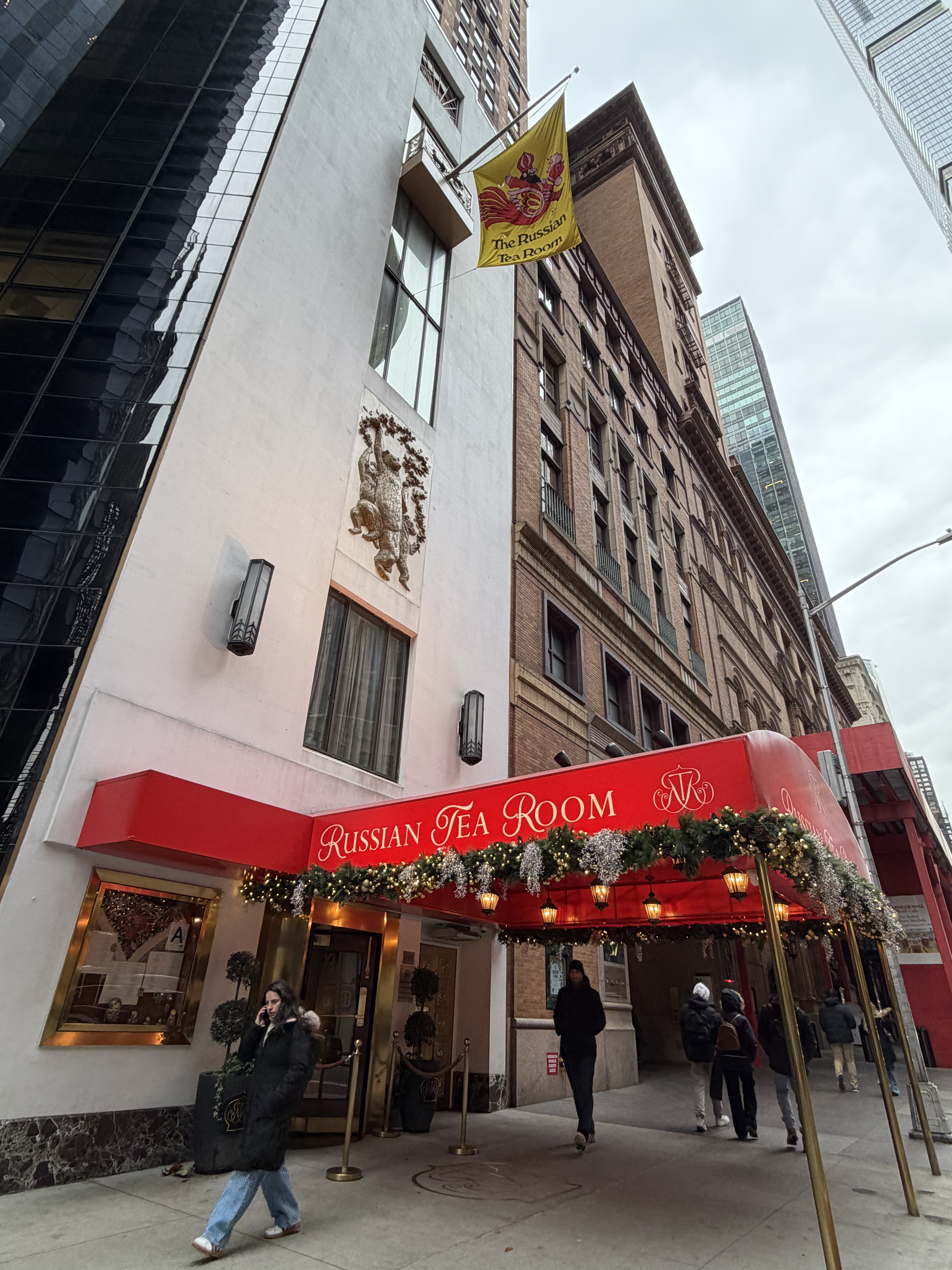
The Russian Tea Room, at 150 West 57th Street, separates the two buildings

Harry Macklowe acquired Feinberg's land soon after the latter company had purchased its site. He also planned to acquire a parking lot two parcels to the west, which was owned by the New York City government and operated by the Carnegie Hall Corporation. The lot to the west had contained the Rembrandt apartment complex before it was demolished in 1963. The parcels were separated by the Russian Tea Room; if the three sites were combined, this could allow a 51-story tower with 1×10^{6} ft^{2} (93,000 m^{2}). Macklowe had offered the Russian Tea Room's owners, Faith and James Stewart-Gordon, $12.5 million for their building's air rights in 1982. However, the Stewart-Gordons refused several offers to acquire their building, so Macklowe withdrew his bid for the Rembrandt site in 1983.

Macklowe acquired air rights from the neighboring 140 West 57th Street. Macklowe purchased additional lots at 148 West 57th Street and 137 West 56th Street in February 1983. He also acquired air rights from 130 West 57th Street and 131-135 West 56th Street in June 1984. After acquiring the air rights and additional buildings, Macklowe revised his plans, proposing a 78-story structure with a hotel and office space on the first 20 stories, as well as residences on the upper 58 stories. Macklowe also planned to reface 140 West 57th Street with a glass facade, but he ultimately decided against doing so. The building was one of several high-rise developments planned for the area at the time. In addition to Macklowe's and Carnegie Hall's developments, Bruce Eichner was developing CitySpire on a plot adjacent to the New York City Center.

==== Construction ====
Macklowe started constructing his skyscraper in 1984. Work on the foundations started two months after the engineering drawings had been completed. The column arrangements and the shear walls on the upper stories were designed as the foundation was being built. A crane on the site collapsed in September 1984 while the foundation was being constructed, but the crane operator was the only person injured. A controversy emerged in early 1985, when the Stewart-Gordons complained that Metropolitan Tower's workers were damaging the restaurant. Additionally, after complaints over how Macklowe was marketing the building as a 78-story structure, the New York City Department of Consumer Affairs forced him to stop doing so.

The concrete for the base and intermediate mechanical story was pumped from 57th Street and was lifted by a crane and bucket on 56th Street. A tower crane with two buckets was used to transport concrete from the ground to the upper stories. One bucket poured concrete on upper stories while the other was receiving concrete at ground level. Each floor slab in the base took four or five days to cast. The tower stories were completed at a rate of two per week, though the topmost stories were completed a rate of once every two days. The building was topped out on October 2, 1985. As the facade was being completed, several of the glass panes cracked; shards of glass reportedly fell onto nearby streets, but no one was injured. James Stewart-Gordon filed a lawsuit against Macklowe in late 1986, alleging that the falling glass and a sidewalk shed outside the construction site was reducing the restaurant's business. After a New York state judge levied a $5,000 daily fine, Macklowe destroyed the shed. The project ultimately involved six hundred workers.

=== Usage ===
==== Opening and early years ====
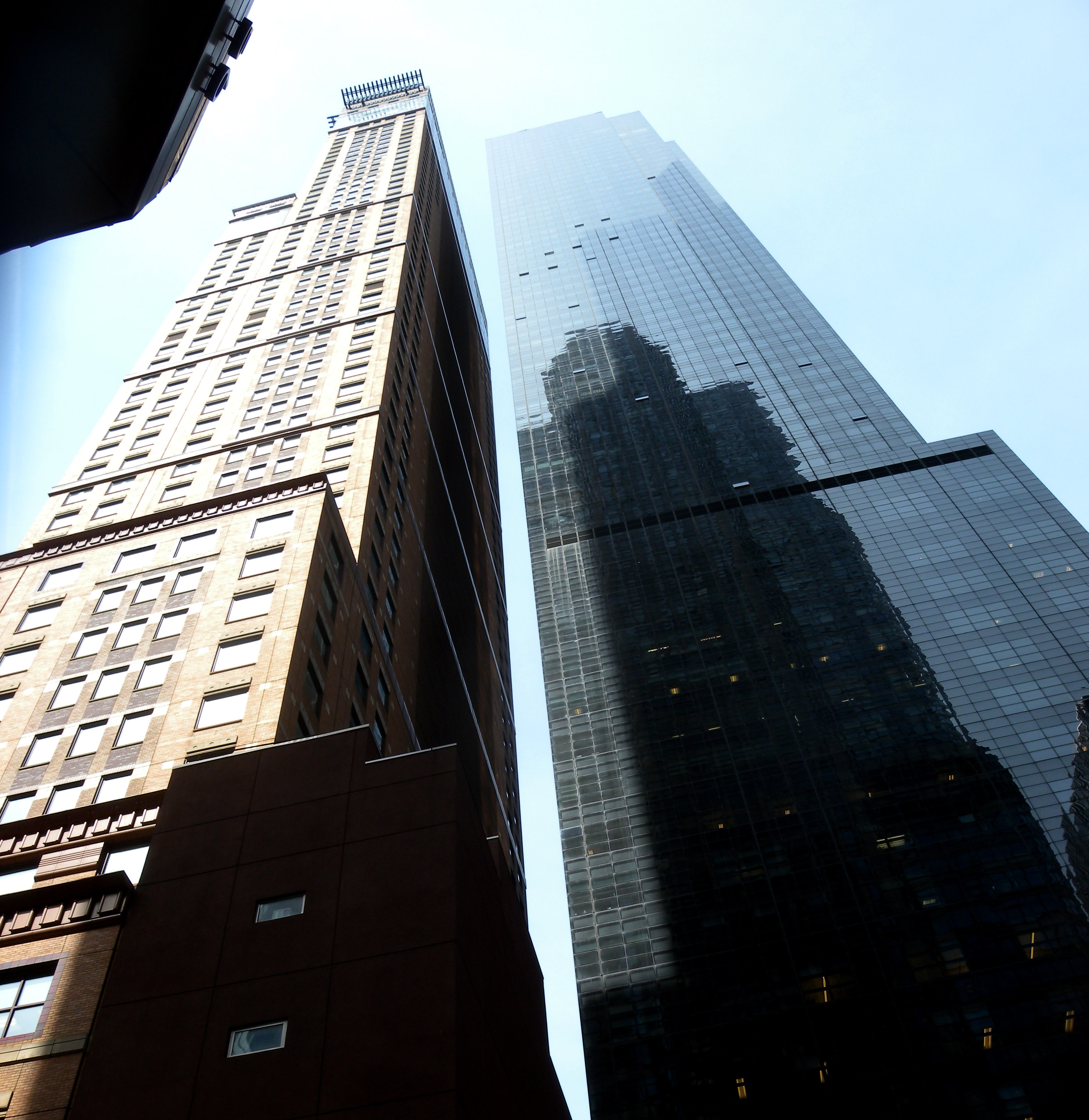
Carnegie Hall Tower (left) and Metropolitan Tower (right) viewed from 56th Street

As proposed, the office stories comprised a single condominium owned by Macklowe, who leased the offices at rates of $44 to $47/ft^{2} ($470 to $510/m^{2}). In the residential stories, each apartment was also its own condominium. The residential units ranged from a $840,000 single-bedroom apartment to the $5 million penthouse. To publicize the building, Macklowe placed floodlights on the facade so it could be seen from as far as North Jersey and Westchester County, New York. Macklowe spent $500,000 on graphics alone, four times as much as the graphics budget on similar projects, and he spent $300,000 to create a short film (Note: The short film was cited as 10 minutes in Newsday and 14 minutes in The New York Times.) for marketing the building. The film was shot in the New York City area and featured an "English earl, Texas rancher, Greek tycoon, [and] Russian spies" as likely buyers. Macklowe hired Bobby Zarem to market the building to tenants. Massimo Vignelli also printed 20,000 copies of an 84-page sales brochure, which Macklowe then autographed personally. Four firms also designed model apartments on floor 35.

A broker was hired to market Metropolitan Tower's apartments; at the time, it was an unusual move for a condominium development in Manhattan, as most condominiums marketed their units with in-house staff. Just before the launch of sales, in late 1985, Macklowe began receiving offers for condominiums from "celebrities, producers, and directors". Among those potential tenants was actor Sylvester Stallone. The interest from the entertainment industry was in part because the building was near the offices of several entertainment companies including CBS and ABC. By early 1986, Macklowe had sold 96 residential units. Metropolitan Tower had been nicknamed "the Russian Tea Room Annex", and a marketing manager said that about two-thirds of residential condominium buyers were Americans. Construction was finished in 1987. That year, computer company Control Data Corporation leased 117,000 ft^{2} (10,900 m^{2}), nearly half of the building's office space. One of the largest residential transactions at Metropolitan Tower occurred shortly after opening, when a single Japanese buyer purchased 36 apartments.

The residential units faced slow sales in part due to the building's location in a traditionally non-residential neighborhood. By 1992, Macklowe owed $3.9 million in taxes on Metropolitan Tower. Ceridian, which took over Control Data Corporation, decided to downsize its space in Metropolitan Tower's base in 1993. Macklowe took back one floor and allowed Ceridian to sublet two other floors in exchange for the tenant extending its lease for nine years. Pacific Eagle, a subsidiary of Hong Kong company Great Eagle, bought the office condominium in November 1994 for $59.1 million. This sale raised some money for Macklowe to pay off his other debts. The Pacific Metropolitan Corporation owned the office portion by 2000.

==== 21st century ====
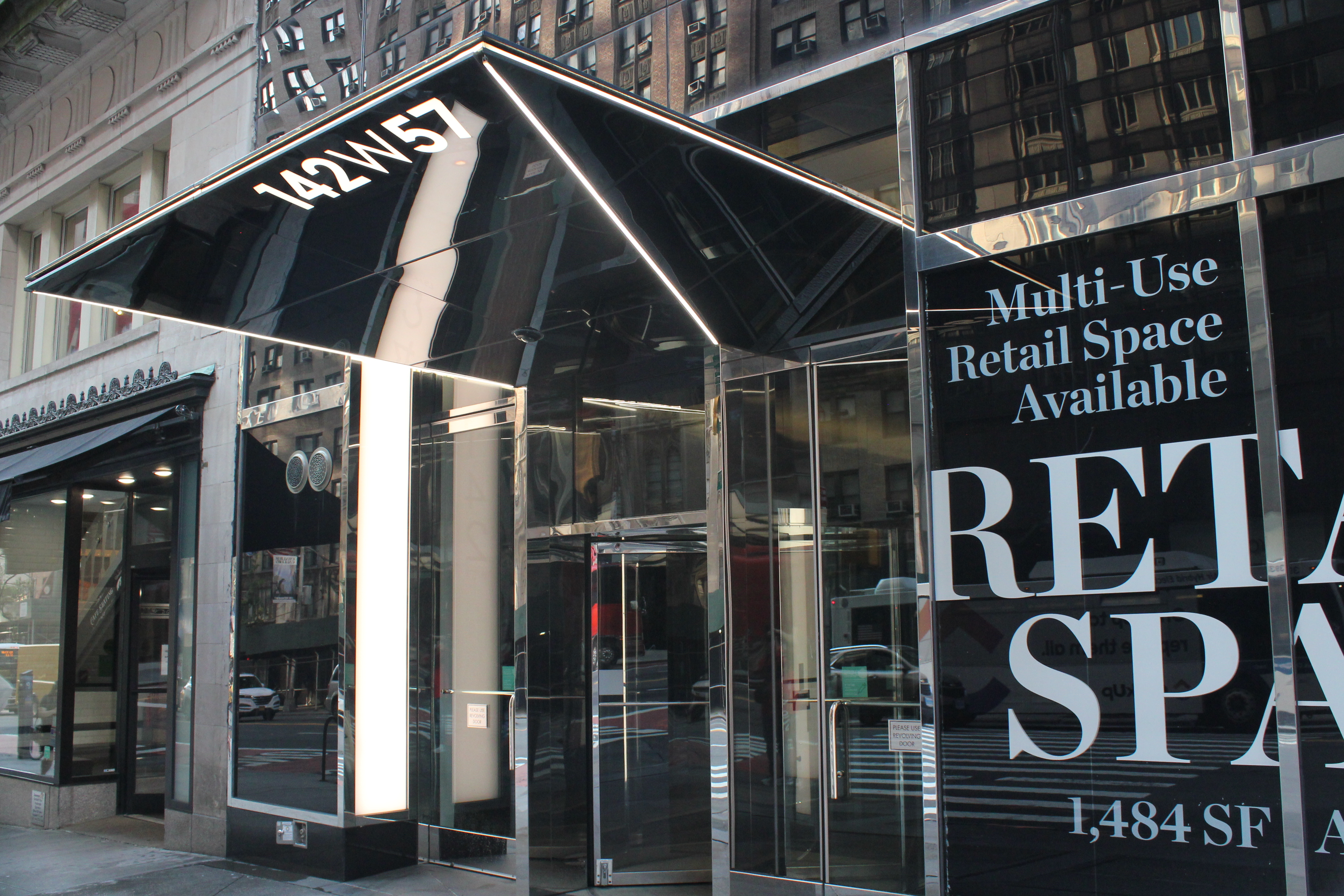
Office entrance

In 2002, a joint venture of L&L Acquisitions and Investcorp Properties bought the office portion of Metropolitan Tower. The sale was valued at over $160 million. Investcorp was replaced by Principal Real Estate Investors as a co-owner of the office condominium in 2005, and the offices were recapitalized at $120 million. The same year, clothing retailer Ann Taylor vacated 150,000 ft^{2} (14,000 m^{2}) of office space at Metropolitan Tower, representing most of the office space in use. BlackRock bought a 98.6 percent ownership stake in the office condominium for $196 million in late 2006. To lease the office space, L&L temporarily removed a dozen glass panels on the second floor to advertise the office-floor space. Hilton Hotels & Resorts leased 15,590 ft^{2} (1,448 m^{2}) of the ground-floor and second-floor space in December 2006 for a marketing center. Afterward, L&L replaced the glass panels and started renovating the lobby. Rogers Marvel Architects was hired to redesign the lobby.

L&L executive David Levinson also converted 105,000 ft^{2} (9,800 m^{2}) of the office space into "prebuilt" offices. By 2009, about 90 percent of the prebuilt units were leased. The office condominium received a $100 million loan from ING Real Estate Finance in 2011. This was superseded in 2015 by a $100 million loan from Aareal Bank. GreenOak Realty bought a 98.6 percent stake in the offices for $163 million in 2016. GreenOak bought the majority stake on behalf of Mitsubishi Corporation, while L&L continued to own the remaining 1.4 percent. At the time, Hutchin Hill, Och Ziff, and Fifth Third Bank were among the office tenants, and 40,000 ft^{2} (3,700 m^{2}) of the office space was vacant. Among the notable residents of Metropolitan Tower's residential condominiums during the 21st century were businessman David Martínez and model Adriana Lima. By the late 2010s, many residents were subleasing their units. In addition, the coworking firm WeWork had leased about 78,000 square feet (7,200 m^{2}) on the upper stories, which the company occupied until its bankruptcy in 2023.

L&L refinanced the building in 2021 with a $92.5 million loan from Aareal. Within two years, L&L was struggling to pay off the mortgage on the office stories, and it defaulted on the loan in April 2023. As such, GDS Development Management and Sabal Investment Holdings took a partial stake in the loan that November. GDS and Sabal subsequently paid $82.6 million for a majority ownership stake in the office stories in March 2024. Later that year, International Workplace Group leased 93,400 square feet (8,680 m^{2}) on six of the office stories. The lobby was renovated, and new amenity areas were added, as part of a 2025 renovation. In addition, GDS constructed prebuilt offices on the 5th and 16th stories.

== Reception ==
When Metropolitan Tower was being planned, Paul Goldberger of The New York Times criticized the tower as "the least respectful of the architectural traditions of this part of town", describing the facade as "slicing arrogantly into the venerable masonry streetscape of West 57th Street". Joe Klein wrote for New York magazine that the building was a "glass-and-steel Godzilla looming ravenously over the elegant shoulders of the Essex House and St. Moritz". In a 1987 New York magazine poll of "more than 100 prominent New Yorkers", Metropolitan Tower was one of the ten most disliked structures in New York City.

Macklowe took some credit for the design, saying he believed Metropolitan Tower was "a seminal building" that would "reshape architectural thinking". He also expressed dissatisfaction at architectural criticism directed toward his buildings "just because I'm a developer and we do the architecture ourselves". After the building was completed, Goldberger was more sympathetic to the design, writing: "What is most remarkable about Metropolitan Tower is the way in which it does not ruin 57th Street, for all that the building defies the street's architectural context." Goldberger attributed this quality to the fact that 140 West 57th Street had not been refaced in glass, as was originally planned. CitySpire, Carnegie Hall Tower, and Metropolitan Tower became known as the "Tuning Fork Trio" because of their shape and proximity to each other. John McPhee of The New Yorker wrote in 2003 that the buildings "look like three chopsticks incongruously holding a cocktail blini", as they surrounded the small Russian Tea Room. In 2017, three decades after the building's completion, Macklowe reflected: "I never got the compliments for" Metropolitan Tower's design.

== See also ==
- List of tallest buildings in New York City
- List of tallest buildings in the United States
