= Manhattan Club =

Manhattan Club may refer to:

- Manhattan Club (social club), Manhattan, New York, 1865–1979
- Manhattan Club (nightclub), East St. Louis, Illinois
- The Manhattan Club (hotel), a timeshare portion of the Park Central Hotel in Midtown Manhattan, New York
