= 125 West 55th Street =

Office skyscraper in Manhattan, New York

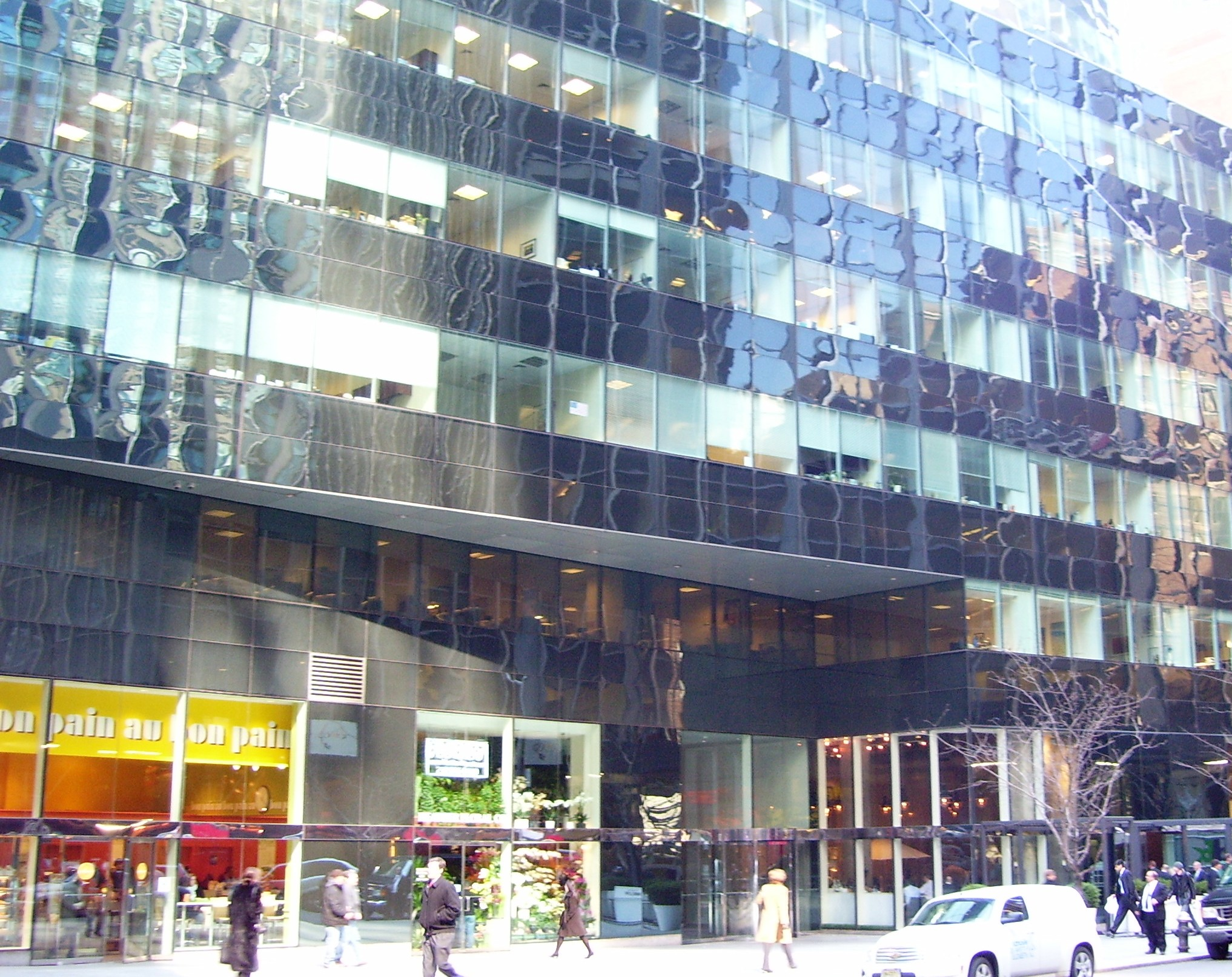
- 125 West 55th Street along 55th Street.
- Alternative names: Avenue of the Americas Plaza

General information
- Type: Office
- Architectural style: Modernist
- Location: 125 West 55th Street, Manhattan, New York City, U.S. 10019
- Coordinates: 40°45′49″N 73°58′44″W
- Construction started: 1988
- Completed: 1990
- Owner: J.P. Morgan Asset Management

Height
- Height: 100.6 m (330 ft)

Technical details
- Floor count: 22

Design and construction
- Architects: Edward Larrabee Barnes and John MY Lee Architects
- Developer: Macklowe Properties
- Structural engineer: Rosenwasser / Grossman Consulting Engineers, P.C.

125 West 55th Street, also known as Avenue of the Americas Plaza, is a 23-story, 575,000-square-foot (53,400 m^{2}) office building located on 55th Street between the Avenue of the Americas (Sixth Avenue) and Seventh Avenue in Midtown Manhattan, New York City. The building also has an entrance at 120 West 56th Street, across the street from the Thompson Central Park New York Hotel.

The facility, with 570,000 square feet (53,000 m^{2}) of rentable office space, was developed by The Macklowe Organization. The building, designed by Edward Larrabee Barnes and John MY Lee Architects, has 23,000-square-foot (2,100 m^{2}) floorplates. The second floor of the building houses Air France's United States executive offices. Until 2024 Macquarie Bank housed its New York representative office in the building. Boston Properties currently owns and manages the building. The building also houses iHeartMedia corporate offices, Premiere Radio Networks and the company's New York radio stations. The iHeart subsidiaries Katz Media Group and Triton Media are also located in the building.

== History ==
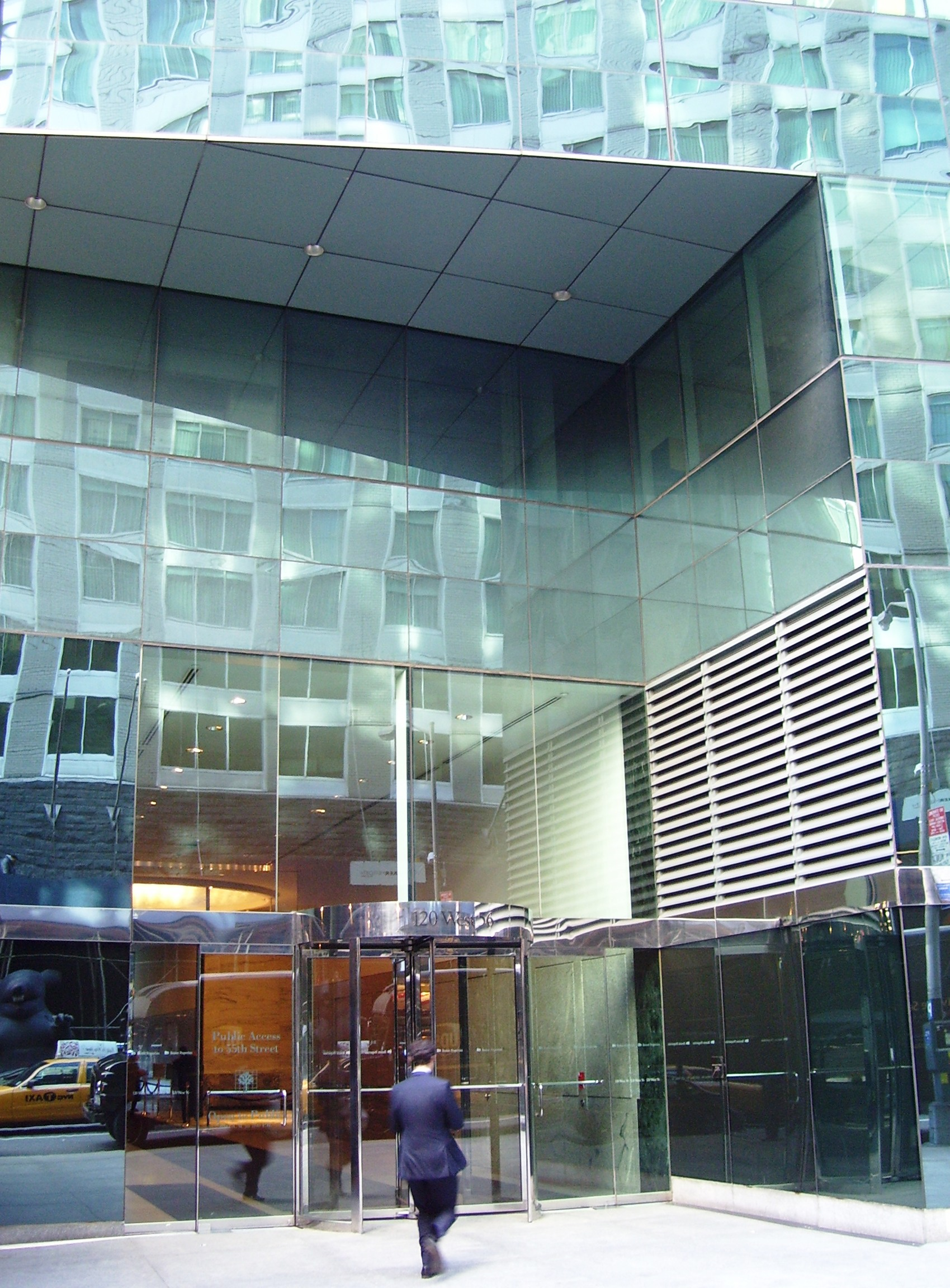
The entrance at 120 West 56th Street

=== Development ===
The building, constructed by Fisher Brothers, cost $60 million in 1988 dollars. The Saint Thomas Choir School previously occupied the site, and moved into a new building at 202 West 58th Street.

Construction on 125 West 55th Street began in 1988. In order to capitalize on a City of New York zoning bonus, the developers planned to have the building's foundation installed by May 13, 1988; buildings in the area installed before a deadline in early 1988 received a 20% increase in size in order to spur development of western Midtown Manhattan. The developers planned to have tenants begin occupying the building in May 1989. The building was completed in 1990.

=== Use ===
In 1991, Air France leased 29,500 square feet (2,740 m^{2}) of space in the building. As of July 10, 1991, it was the largest lease in Manhattan in the year 1991. The airline had planned to move its Northeast United States headquarters, its U.S. reservation center, and its New York City ticket office to the building beginning in 1992. The lease included 27,000 square feet (2,500 m^{2}) of office space on the building's second floor and 2,500 square feet (230 m^{2}) of retail space on the first floor. Air France had its previous ticket office at 666 Fifth Avenue and its previous reservation department at 888 Seventh Avenue, and wanted a larger ticket office facility and overhauled reservation department offices. It moved both departments into 125 West 55th Street. Air France opted to move into 125 West 55th Street instead of spending $2.5 million to upgrade the telecommunications systems and remove asbestos at 888 Seventh Avenue; 125 West 55th Street came with the latest fiber optics systems and did not have asbestos. Air France has since closed the street-level retail ticket office.

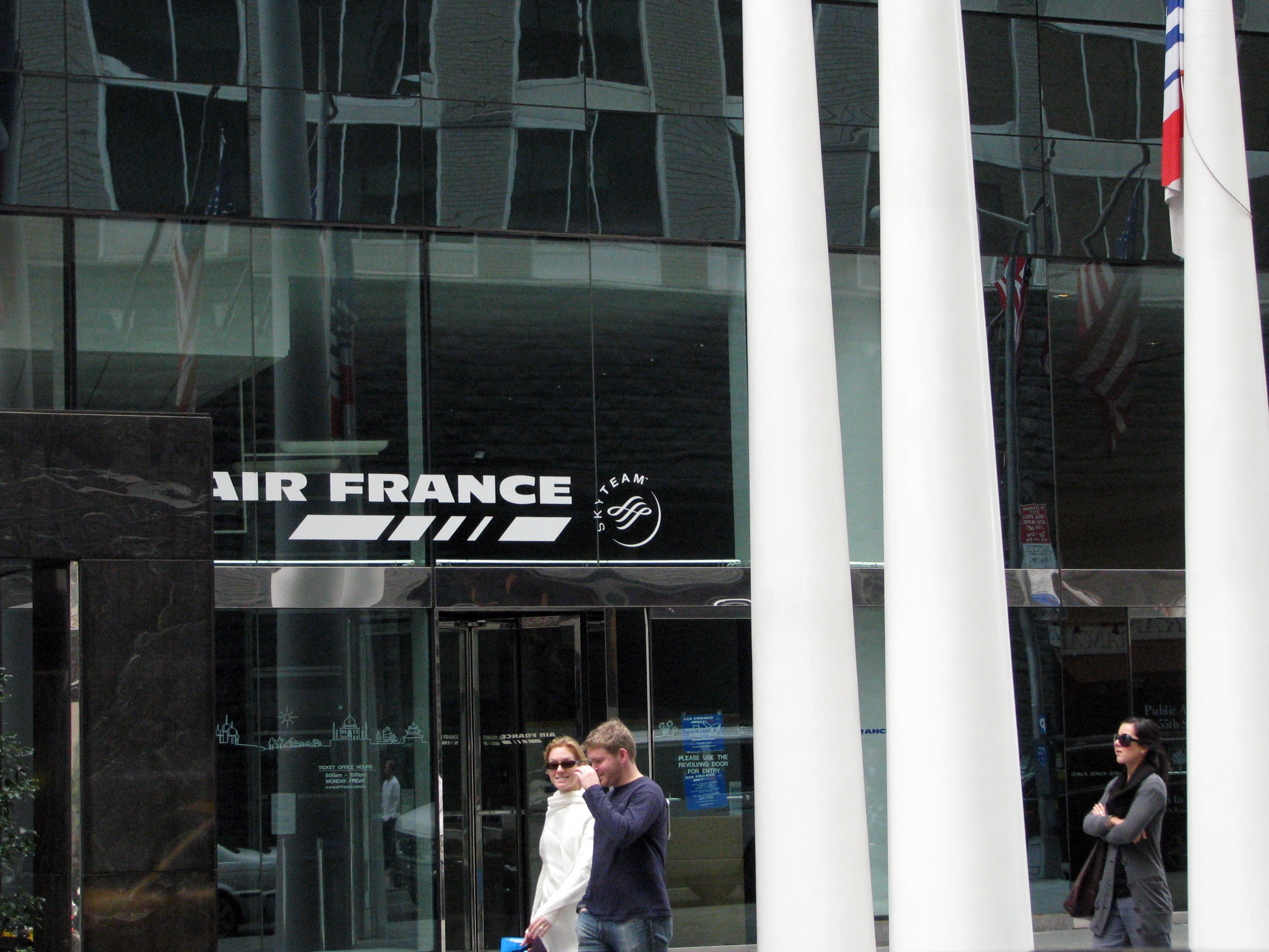
The 120 West 56th Street entrance in 2009, indicating an Air France ticket office that was there, but is no longer

Around the same time, Katz Media Group signed a lease for 170,000 square feet (16,000 m^{2}) of space in the building. As of November 24, 1991, the Katz lease was the fourth largest lease in New York City. During that year the National Bank of Canada and Credietbank were tenants in the building.

In the summer of 1992, LeBoeuf, Lamb, Leiby & MacRae moved 1,200 employees into the building. The firm had consolidated from several previous locations, and occupied eight floors and the concourse level. The 20-year lease was for 224,000 square feet (20,800 m^{2}) of space. The LeBouef deal, signed in 1991, was that year's second largest lease in New York City as of November 24, 1991.

Boston Properties acquired the building in 2008, for $444 million. In 2010, Katz Media Group renewed its lease until 2027, giving Katz more than one-third of the building space, with about 200,000 square feet (19,000 m^{2}). In 2010 MetLife refinanced a portion of the debt of the building. As of 2011 the building was worth $345 million. In 2011 a former deputy of Harry Macklowe, former head of the Macklowe Group, filed a lawsuit against Macklowe, saying that Macklowe did not share the proceeds of the sale of 125 West 55th Street.

== Design ==
Thomas L. Waite of The New York Times said in 1988, before the completion of the building, that the blue glass sheathing around it "may give it a pastoral sheen." Waite said that the design of 125 West 55th Street is similar to that of the Metropolitan Tower.
