= Park Central Hotel =

Hotel in Manhattan, New York

- Viewed from 7th Avenue and West 56th Street (2010)

General information
- Type: Hotel
- Architectural style: Renaissance revival
- Location: 870 7th Avenue, Midtown Manhattan, New York City, New York, U.S., 860–882 7th Avenue, 201–211 West 55th Street
- Coordinates: 40°45′53″N 73°58′52″W
- Completed: 1926
- Opened: June 12, 1927

Height
- Height: 357 feet (109 m)

Technical details
- Floor count: 25

Design and construction
- Architects: Gronenberg & Leuchtag

The Park Central Hotel is a 25-story, 761-room hotel located southwest of Carnegie Hall at 870 7th Avenue (between West 55th and 56th streets) in Midtown Manhattan, New York City. It was designed in the Renaissance Revival style and opened on June 12, 1927. The Park Central is an independent hotel managed by Highgate Holdings.

== Description ==
The Park Central Hotel is named because of its proximity to Central Park, though it does not have views of the park. It was designed in the Renaissance Revival style and has housed such figures as Jackie Gleason, Mae West, and Eleanor Roosevelt, who kept a suite there from 1950 to 1953. It occupies the east half of the city block between Seventh Avenue and Broadway. Anchoring the west half is 1740 Broadway, a 26-story, 375-foot (114 m) skyscraper formerly owned by Mutual of New York, with a weather beacon as well as an imposing façade.

The Mermaid Room was created as the hotel's cocktail bar and nightclub in May 1946. Irving Fields and his trio played there from 1950 to 1966.

== History ==
The hotel is located on the former site of the Van Corlear building, the first apartment hotel in New York City, designed by Henry Janeway Hardenbergh, built in 1879 and demolished in 1921.

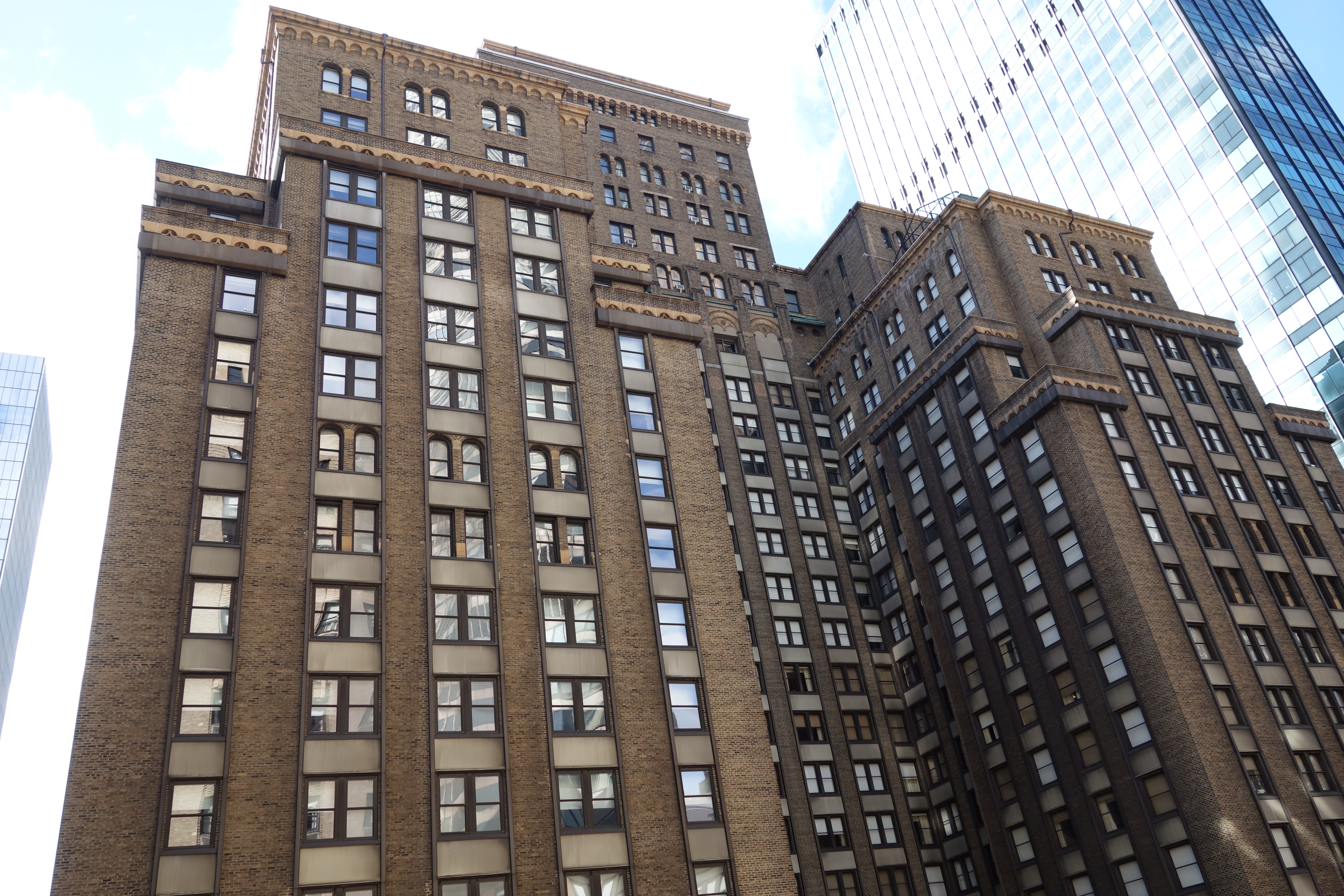
Upper floors

The Park Central Hotel was built by Harry A. Lanzer and opened on June 12, 1927. Lanzer sold the hotel to Sheraton in 1948 and it became the Park-Sheraton Hotel. Sheraton renamed it The New York Sheraton Hotel in 1972, not to be confused with the later Sheraton New York Hotel. In 1983, Sheraton sold the hotel for $60 million to V.M.S. Realty, which contracted with Dunfey Hotels to manage the hotel through their Omni Hotels division, and the hotel was renamed the Omni Park Central in January 1984. The hotel was sold to developer Ian Bruce Eichner in 1995 and left the Omni chain, reverting to its original name, Park Central Hotel. Eichner converted half the hotel's 1,450 rooms into the Manhattan Club, a 286-unit, all-suite timeshare development located at the north side of the hotel at 200 West 56th Street.

Today, the Park Central is an independent hotel managed by Highgate Holdings. The facade was renovated in 2007.

In 2013, the hotel's swimming pool was converted into an event space.

=== Notable events and people ===
The hotel is infamous as the site of the assassination of mobster Albert Anastasia, which took place on October 25, 1957, in the hotel's barber shop. In 1928, Jewish gangster and well-dressed prototype of the modern don, Arnold Rothstein, was shot and fatally wounded inside one of the suites.

Silent-film actor Roscoe Arbuckle died in 1933 from a heart attack in his sleep in his suite in the hotel.

Jackie Gleason lived at the hotel from 1955-1956, while filming The Honeymooners.

The hotel was the venue for the National Football League Draft from 1980 to 1985.

| Preceded by Waldorf Astoria New York | Venues of the NFL draft 1980–1985 | Succeeded by New York Marriott Marquis |
