= Random House Tower =

Skyscraper in Manhattan, New York

Random House Tower and Park Imperial
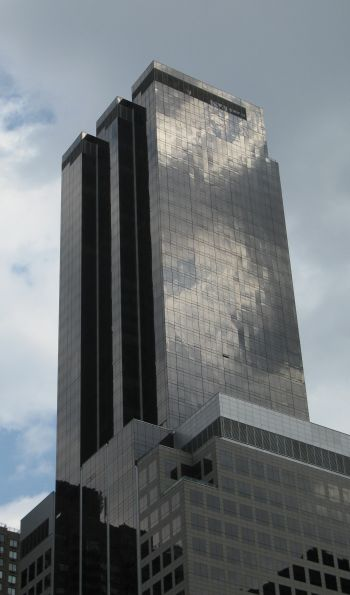
- The tower from the southwest
- Interactive map of the Random House Tower and Park Imperial area

General information
- Status: Completed
- Type: Apartments, office
- Location: 1745 Broadway/230 West 56th Street, Manhattan, New York, U.S.
- Coordinates: 40.765341°N 73.982502°W
- Construction started: 2000
- Completed: 2003
- Cost: $300 Million
- Owner: SL Green/Ivanhoé Cambridge/Witkoff/Lehman Brothers (office portion)

Height
- Roof: 684 ft (208 m)
- Top floor: 632 ft (193 m)

Technical details
- Floor area: 860,036 sq ft (79,900.0 m^{2})

Design and construction
- Architects: Skidmore, Owings and Merrill and Ismael Leyva
- Structural engineer: Thornton Tomasetti

The Random House Tower, also known as the Park Imperial Apartments, is a 52-story, 684 ft (208 m) mixed-use tower in Midtown Manhattan, New York City. It is owned by real estate companies SL Green Realty and Ivanhoé Cambridge.

Since its opening, the office portion of the tower has been leased by Random House, a global publishing company. Since 2016, it also has served as the global headquarters for Penguin Random House, its parent company, which was the inspiration for the building's name. On upper floors, above the offices, the tower maintains a luxury apartment complex. The entrance to Penguin Random House is on Broadway, and includes the lower 27 floors. The apartment complex entrance is on West 56th Street.

== Description ==
The complex is on a trapezoidal block between 55th Street and 56th Street and follows the angle of Broadway. It has jagged setbacks to improve the views of Central Park.

The Random House Tower is divided into two parts: the office floors on the 2nd through 26th stories, and the residential floors between the 27th and 51st stories. The first floor contains 32,000 sq ft (3,000 m^{2}) of retail space. Separate architects designed each of the sections. Skidmore, Owings & Merrill designed the office portion, which has a steel frame. Ismael Leyva Architects and Adam D. Tihany designed the residential portion, which has a concrete frame. The two sections do not entirely line up, and trusses were built on the 26th and 27th floor to transfer the load.

The residential section of the tower has 130 apartments. The apartments have ten-foot ceilings, and there are five penthouses of up to 2,970 sq ft (276 m^{2}). The residential floors are numbered 48-70 for marketing purposes. Among the first tenants were rapper P. Diddy and New York Yankees pitcher Randy Johnson.

The building has two fluid tuned mass dampers, which are designed to damp building sway. Located on the 50th floor mechanical room, they have 16-inch-thick (41 cm) concrete walls, and measure 20 feet (6.1 m) wide by 70 feet (21 m) long and 12 feet (3.7 m) tall. One tank runs west-east and the other runs north-south.

== History ==
When the lease of its longtime headquarters at 201 East 50th Street was ending, Random House decided to expand its headquarters and move to a newly built tower. They originally planned in 1998 to build a tower at 45th and Broadway across from its parent company Bertelsmann's headquarters at 1540 Broadway with a neon-lighted skyway across 45th Street connecting them, but after long negotiations the owner of the property withdrew from the plans. Looking for an alternative, the company spoke with various developers, who were already planning apartment buildings, and in 1999 decided for the project of Stephen M. Ross at Broadway and 55th Street, which was already under construction. Subsequently, they assigned architects to develop a new design.

While the building has functioned as Random House's headquarters ever since, the 2013 newly formed Penguin Random House parent company initially worked from SoHo at 345 and 375 Hudson Street. In 2016, two years before the lease of the Random House Tower would end, the company extended the contract till 2033 and also moved to the tower of its subsidiary. There, Penguin Random House occupies 603,650 sq ft (56,081 m^{2}) and employs 2,400 people.

== Critical reception ==
Critics have noted that its three main towers give it the impression of being three books (although the architects referred to them as "three sliding crystals").
