= 56th Street (Manhattan) =

West-east street in Manhattan, New York

- West 56th Street / East 56th Street
- View of 56th Street at Sixth Avenue.
- Interactive map of 56th Street
- Maintained by: New York City Department of Transportation
- Location: Midtown Manhattan, Manhattan, New York City
- Postal code: 10019, 10022
- Coordinates: 40°45′54″N 73°58′21″W
- West end: New York State Route 9A; West Side Highway
- Major junctions: Eighth Avenue; Broadway; Seventh Avenue; Sixth Avenue; Fifth Avenue; Madison Avenue; Park Avenue; Lexington Avenue; Third Avenue; Second Avenue; First Avenue; York Avenue
- East end: Sutton Place

Construction
- Commissioned: 1811

Other
- Known for: Billionaires' Row; Carnegie Hall

56th Street is a crosstown street in the New York City borough of Manhattan. It runs from the West Side Highway on the West Side to Sutton Place on the East Side.

== Route description ==
As with numbered streets in Manhattan, Fifth Avenue separates 56th Street into "east" and "west" sections. 56th Street is one-way, one-lane eastbound for its entirety.

A section of West 56th Street between 6th and 7th Avenues is named as Wynn Handman Way in September 2022 to celebrate his recognition.

Several buildings in Billionaires' Row touch 56th Street.

== History ==
56th Street was created under the Commissioners' Plan of 1811 as one of the minor east-west streets across Manhattan.

The block of 56th Street from Fifth to Sixth avenues contained rowhouses by 1871, many of which were recessed from the lot line and had entrance stoops. By the end of the 19th century, the area had many wealthy residents, and the houses in the area were either modified or rebuilt altogether. That block of West 56th Street developed into a "bankers' row" with the residences of Frederick C. and Birdsall Otis Edey at number 10, Henry Seligman at number 30, Edward Wasserman at number 33, and Arthur Lehman at number 31. Many of these houses persisted through the mid-20th century as part of a restaurant and retail strip.

== Transportation ==
No city buses run through 56th Street. However, there are entrances to the New York City Subway's 57th Street station at Sixth Avenue.

== Notable buildings ==
From west to east:

- Terminal 5 – Between Twelfth and Eleventh Avenue
- High School for Environmental Studies – Between Tenth and Ninth Avenue
- Hearst Tower – Between Ninth and Eighth Avenue
- Random House Tower – Between Eighth Avenue and Broadway
- Broadway Tabernacle – Formerly at northeast corner with Broadway
- 1740 Broadway – Southeast corner with Broadway
- Park Central Hotel – Southwest corner with Seventh Avenue
  - The Manhattan Club, part of the Park Central Hotel building but accessed from West 56th Street
- 888 Seventh Avenue – Northwest corner with Seventh Avenue
- Carnegie Hall – Northeast corner with Seventh Avenue, a New York City designated landmark
- Carnegie Hall Tower – Between Seventh and Sixth Avenue
- CitySpire – Between Seventh and Sixth Avenue
- Metropolitan Tower – Between Seventh and Sixth Avenue
- New York City Center (rear facade) – Between Seventh and Sixth Avenue, a New York City designated landmark
- 120 West 56th Street – Between Seventh and Sixth Avenue
- Thompson Central Park New York Hotel – Between Seventh and Sixth Avenue
- 30 West 56th Street – Between Sixth and Fifth Avenue, a New York City designated landmark
- 26 West 56th Street – Between Sixth and Fifth Avenue, a New York City designated landmark
- 17 West 56th Street – Between Sixth and Fifth Avenue, a New York City designated landmark
- 12 West 56th Street – Between Sixth and Fifth Avenue, a New York City designated landmark
- 10 West 56th Street – Between Sixth and Fifth Avenue, a New York City designated landmark
- 712 Fifth Avenue – Southwest corner with Fifth Avenue
- Trump Tower – Northeast corner with Fifth Avenue
- 550 Madison Avenue – Northeast corner with Madison Avenue
- 590 Madison Avenue – Northwest corner with Madison Avenue
- Park Avenue Tower – Between Madison and Park Avenue
- 432 Park Avenue – Between Madison and Park Avenue
- 425 Park Avenue – Southeast corner with Park Avenue
- Lombardy Hotel – Between Park and Lexington Avenue
