= 1540 Broadway =

Office skyscraper in Manhattan, New York

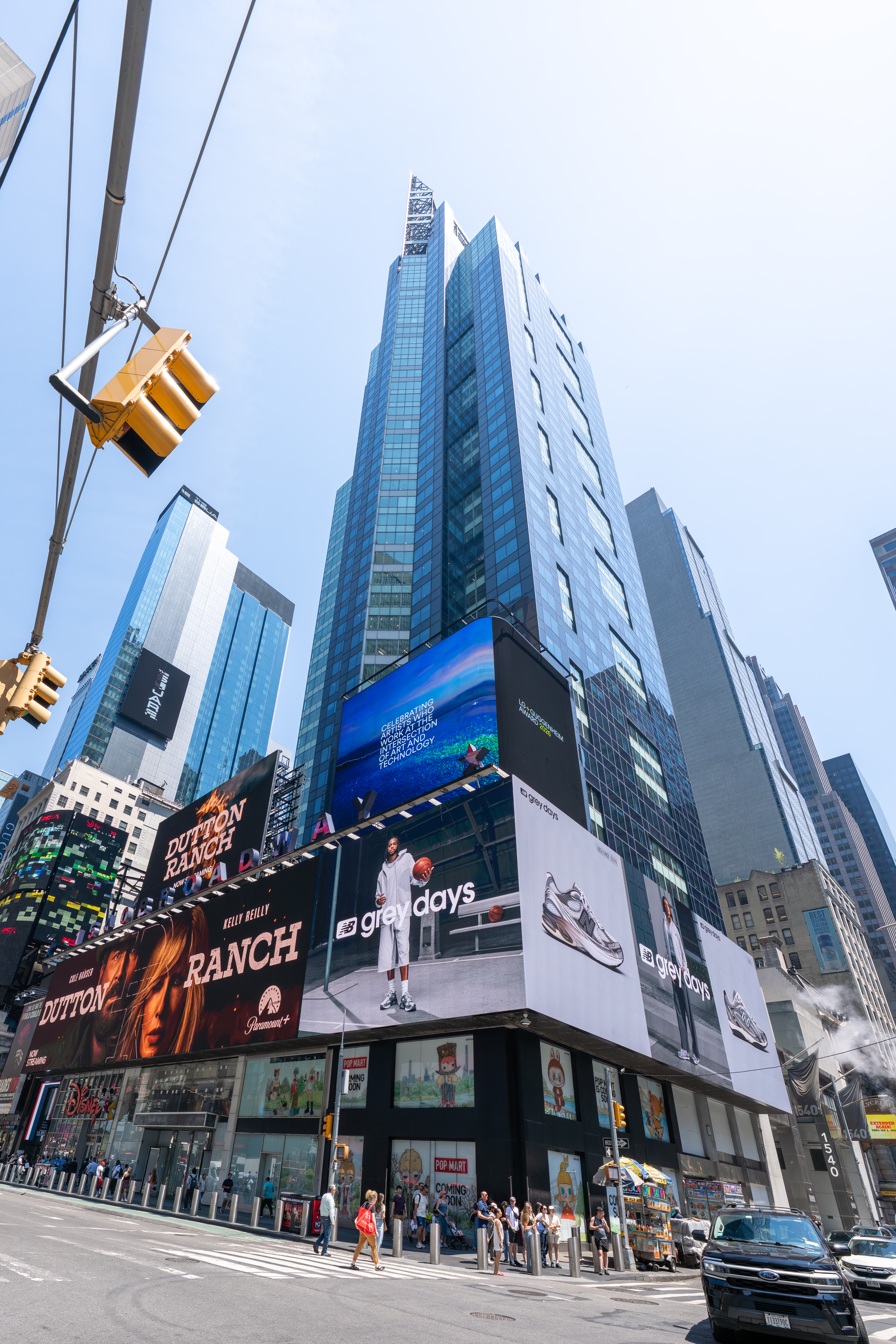
- Former names: Bertelsmann Building

General information
- Type: Office
- Location: Manhattan, New York, U.S.
- Coordinates: 40°45′29″N 73°59′06″W
- Construction started: 1988
- Completed: 1990
- Opening: 1993
- Owner: HSBC; Edge Funds
- Operator: Edge Funds

Height
- Antenna spire: 733 ft (223 m)
- Roof: 616 ft (188 m)
- Top floor: 564 ft (172 m)

Technical details
- Floor count: 44
- Floor area: 1,100,000 ft^{2} (100,000 m^{2})

Design and construction
- Architect: David Childs of Skidmore, Owings and Merrill
- Developer: Ian Bruce Eichner

1540 Broadway, formerly the Bertelsmann Building, is a 44-story office building on Times Square in the Theater District neighborhood of Manhattan in New York City. Designed by David Childs of Skidmore, Owings & Merrill (SOM), the building was developed by Broadway State Partners, a joint venture between Bruce Eichner and VMS Development. 1540 Broadway occupies a site bounded by Broadway to the west, 45th Street to the south, and 46th Street to the north. It was originally named for its anchor tenant, German media company Bertelsmann. The building is divided into two ownership units: HSBC and Edge Funds Advisors own the office stories, while Vornado Realty Trust owns retail space at the base.

1540 Broadway consists of a low base, as well as a tower section measuring 733 ft (223 m) to its spire. An outwardly projecting "prow" extends from the western side of the building. The facade is designed with large signs at the base, with a main office entrance on 45th Street. The upper stories contain a facade of blue and green glass with vertical aluminum mullions. There is a public passageway and about 150,000 ft^{2} (14,000 m^{2}) of retail space at the base; the retail space was originally supposed to be part of a five-story shopping mall that was never opened. The basement formerly contained a four-screen movie theater, while the upper stories contain 860,000 ft^{2} (80,000 m^{2}) of offices.

Broadway State Partners had developed 1540 Broadway on the site of Loew's State Theatre and several other buildings. Helmut Jahn initially proposed a mixed-use office, hotel, and commercial building on the site, though Childs subsequently drew up plans for an office building with retail at its base. Work started in 1988 and the building was completed in 1990, but it was completely empty for the next three years. Bertelsmann bought the building out of bankruptcy in 1992 and moved its headquarters there, opening several retail stores in the late 1990s. The Paramount Group bought the building in 2004, reselling the offices two years later to Equity Office Properties and the stores to Vornado. The offices were subsequently resold to Harry B. Macklowe in 2007, Deutsche Bank in 2008, and CBRE Group in 2009; HSBC and Edge acquired the offices in a two-part sale in 2010 and 2011.

== Site ==
1540 Broadway is on the east side of Broadway, along Times Square between 45th Street (George Abbott Way) to the south and 46th Street to the north, in the Midtown Manhattan neighborhood of New York City, New York, U.S. The irregularly shaped land lot covers 38,700 ft^{2} (3,600 m^{2}), with a frontage of 180 ft (55 m) on Broadway and a depth of 186.06 ft (57 m). The building wraps around another structure at the northwest corner, and the section of the building on 46th Street extends further east than the portion on 45th Street. The northern end of the building faces Duffy Square.

The surrounding area is part of Manhattan's Theater District and contains many Broadway theaters. On the same block are the Lyceum Theatre, the Jacqueline Kennedy Onassis High School for International Careers, and Americas Tower to the east. Other nearby buildings include the Hotel Edison and Lunt-Fontanne Theatre to the northwest; TSX Broadway, the Palace and Embassy Theatres, and the I. Miller Building to the north; 1530 Broadway, the Hudson Theatre, and the Millennium Times Square New York hotel to the south; One Astor Plaza to the southwest; and the New York Marriott Marquis hotel to the west.

The site formerly contained Loew's State Theatre, built in 1921 at the address 1540 Broadway. Loew's State Theatre had been housed within a 17-story office building prior to its demolition in 1987. The old theater's design had complemented that of the Lyceum Theatre, a Broadway theater, immediately to the east. The site had also contained several smaller buildings, including a United Service Organizations (USO) recruitment center.

== Architecture ==
1540 Broadway was designed by Skidmore, Owings & Merrill (SOM), with David Childs of SOM as the project's partner-in-charge. It was developed by Bruce Eichner of Eichner Properties in collaboration with Chicago-based firm VMS Development. The building has 42 stories and four basements. It measures 733 ft (223 m) to its spire. The top floor is 564 ft (172 m) high, while the roof is 578 ft (176 m) high. German entertainment conglomerate Bertelsmann originally occupied most of the space.

=== Form and facade ===
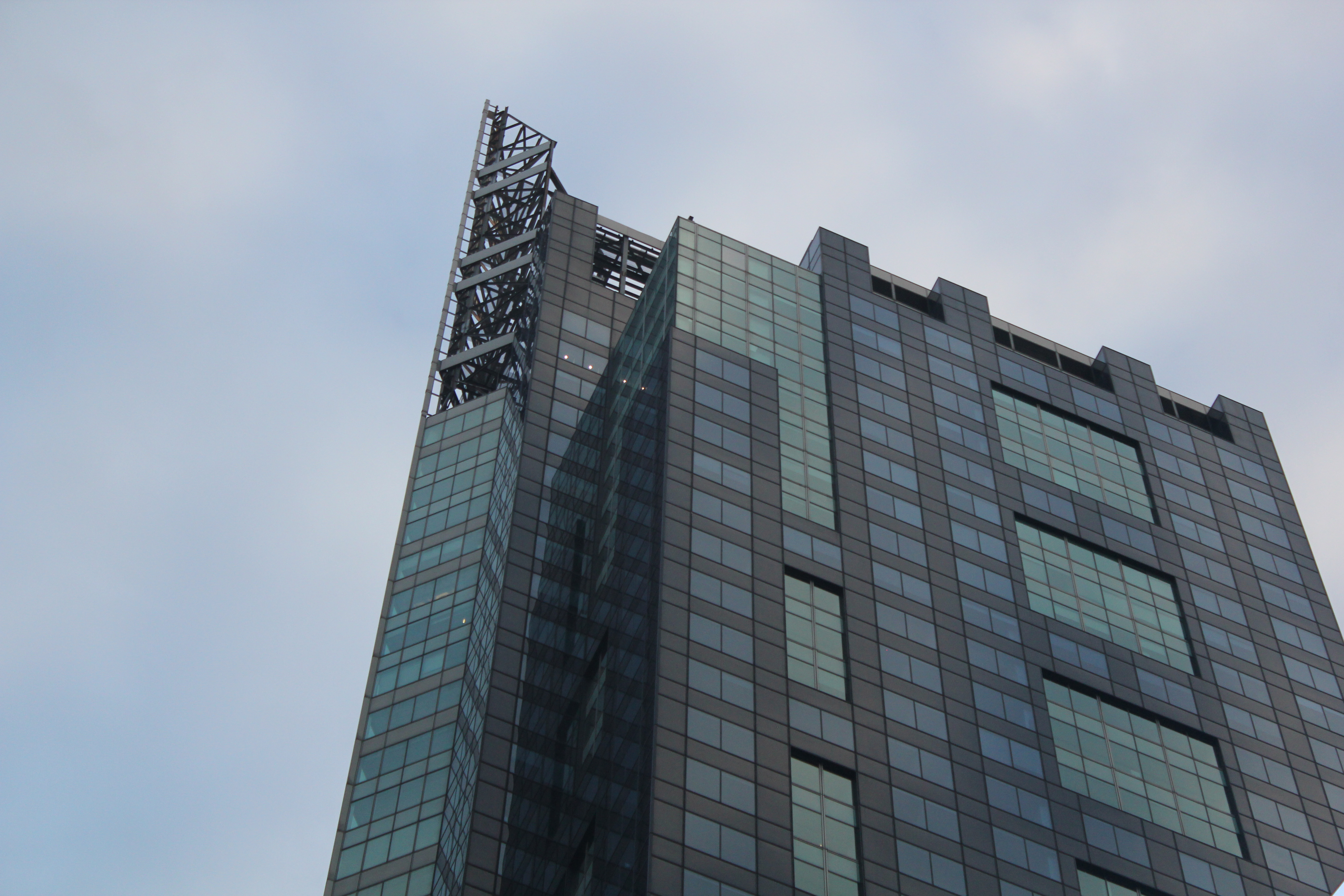
View of 1540 Broadway from ground level, with the spire at left and the glass facade at right

1540 Broadway's base measures either 60 ft (18 m) or 62 ft (19 m) tall. above which are multiple setbacks. The building's massing contains a prow-shaped projection on its western end, facing Broadway. Though this prow was initially planned as a sign across a small section of the building, it ultimately was installed along the building's full height. The concept for a prow-shaped sign was then changed to a skeletal metal framework, then to usable office space. At the top of the prow is a metal spire with a frame, which extends 100 ft (30 m) or 157 feet (48 m) high. The spire was influenced by deconstructivist motifs, which led Childs to remark, "We've pinned the bow tie!", a reference to the building's location near the center of the bowtie-shaped Times Square. The skeletal frame's design also evoked the framework of the large billboards on Times Square.

The building's facade was originally planned to contain 16,000 ft^{2} (1,500 m^{2}) of electronic signs, consisting of 12,000 ft^{2} (1,100 m^{2}) of three-dimensional signs and 4,000 ft^{2} (370 m^{2}) of flat signs. As built, the base of the building contained 13,000 ft^{2} (1,200 m^{2}) of signage, as well as a 25 ft-high (7.6 m) electronic sign at the middle of the atrium. When the building opened, it had a 34 by 65 ft (10 by 20 m) Qlinn display on one of its setbacks; the display included 84,000 rotating cubes with red, green, white, and blue faces. Early plans for the building had called for a large clock to be mounted on the base. In 2013, a LED sign measuring 41 by 72 ft (12 by 22 m) was mounted on the building.

The main entrance to the upper-story offices and the building's ground-floor pedestrian arcade is on 45th Street, where a silver canopy spans three bays. The westernmost bay leads to the pedestrian arcade, while the center bay leads to the office lobby. The top of the main entrance is aligned with the cornice of the neighboring Lyceum Theatre. Originally, there was a large entrance on Broadway for a shopping mall.

According to Childs, the building's upper stories were intended to appear "bright and brassy" from Broadway, while the 45th and 46th Street facades were intended to give a more muted, corporate appearance. The facade is primarily made of glass with vertical aluminum mullions. The tower section's primary facade is made of blue glass, containing mullions that are flush with the surface of the facade. On 46th Street, the tower is largely faced in green glass, with silver mullions and horizontal white spandrels. The green-glass section on 46th Street rises 25 stories before setting back into the main blue-glass section. The blue-glass facade also contains several rectangular sections of green-glass cladding, which are recessed within the main blue-glass wall.

=== Features ===
==== Base ====
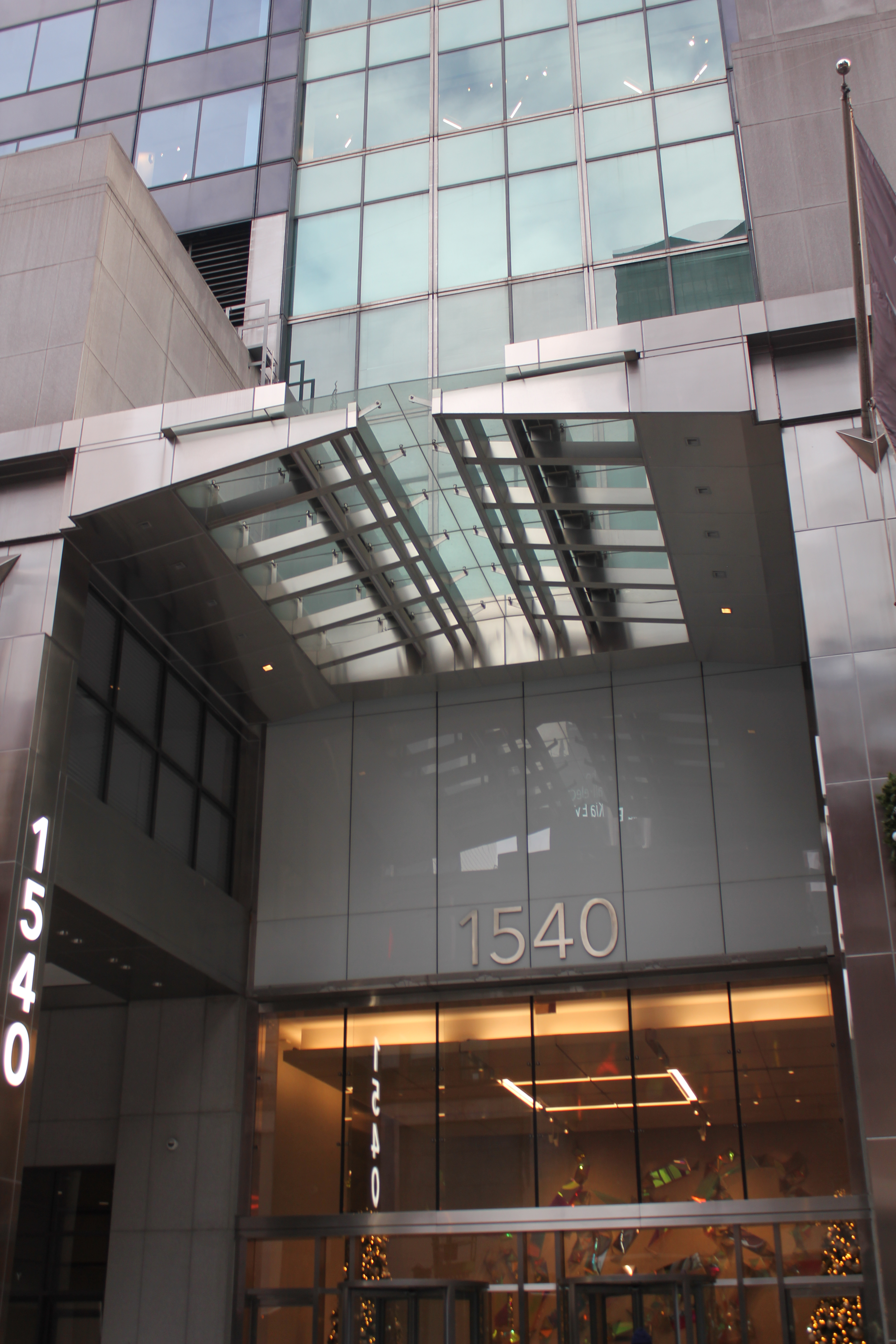
Office lobby entrance

A pedestrian arcade between 46th and 45th Streets is included in 1540 Broadway's base. It was built as a "through-block connection" under the Special Midtown District, created in 1982. The passageway is 100 ft (30 m) east of Broadway and has 3,012 ft^{2} (279.8 m^{2}) of floor area. The arcade contains display cases and storefronts on the western wall, while its northern end is outdoors and under a canopy. The arcade is directly across from the Millennium Times Square's passageway to the south. Next to the arcade is the office lobby, decorated in green and gray marble. When Bertelsmann owned the building, the lobby contained a 9 ft-high (2.7 m) etched-glass triptych of Elvis Presley, a copy of a larger triptych that Bertelsmann subsidiary RCA Records had donated to Presley's Graceland mansion. BNK Architects also designed a multimedia display for Bertelsmann in the lobby.

The base contained a retail atrium covering 150,000 ft^{2} (14,000 m^{2}), including 65,000 ft^{2} (6,000 m^{2}) of storefronts. The space connected to the through-block pedestrian passageway. The space was originally planned as a six-level mall, which never opened due to financial shortfalls. Had the mall opened as intended, there would have been as many as 50 stores, including a 12,000 ft^{2} (1,100 m^{2}) Musicland store. There would have been restaurants on the two highest levels, as well as boutiques and shops on the three levels beneath. The interior of the mall would have contained a semicircular wall with an electronic sign measuring 120 ft (37 m) wide and 90 ft (27 m) high. In the basement was to be a parking lot, as well as a movie theater. The shopping mall was designed with deconstructive motifs as well. These included square pillars, which changed to round columns on upper levels; escalators with glass panels, showing the interior machinery; and a kiosk that appeared as a stainless-steel core from some angles.

The retail space was ultimately occupied by a 75,000 ft^{2} (7,000 m^{2}) Virgin Megastore from 1996 to 2009. designed by Bibliowicz Nelligan Kriegel. The store occupied four levels, with a book department in the second basement; jazz and classical departments in the first basement; rock, R&B, and Virgin merchandise on the first floor; and a cafe on the mezzanine. A Virgin Atlantic airline ticket booth abutted the store. Another 35,000 ft^{2} (3,300 m^{2}) on the first, second, and third floors were taken up by the Official All Star Café, which had 650 seats plus a 250-seat bar; the restaurant served "arena food". The basement movie theater, operated by Sony Loews from 1996 to 2006, had four screens and could fit 1,400 people. A 20,000 ft^{2} (1,900 m^{2}) Disney Store opened within the former Virgin Megastore space in 2010, along with a 90,000 ft^{2} (8,400 m^{2}) Forever 21 spanning four levels. The tenants in the retail space as of 2022 include Disney, Forever 21, and Sunglass Hut.

==== Offices ====
The building was also planned with 850,000 ft^{2} (79,000 m^{2}) of office space. The lower stories are designed with floor areas of 26,500 ft^{2} (2,460 m^{2}) each, while the tower floors are as small as 17,500 ft^{2} (1,630 m^{2}). Swanke Hayden Connell Architects designed the interiors of the Bertelsmann offices. Each of Bertelsmann's musical divisions was situated on a floor with a design ranging "from hip to sedate". The distance between each story's floor slab is 13 ft (4.0 m). Additionally, space on two floors was set aside as an "incubator" for foreign companies wishing to start up in New York City.

In 2009, then-owner CBRE Group converted the eighth floor into a tenant amenity space with a conference center, concierge, catering, and fitness room. The amenity floor is hidden behind some of the exterior trusses and signs on Times Square. Further improvements were made to the amenity floor in 2019, when Gensler remodeled it. The renovated amenity floor includes a fitness center, barista, small food hall, tenant lounge, and three meeting rooms. The amenity floor is called Stage 8 and contains design motifs and a color scheme that are intended to recall the Broadway theaters nearby.

== History ==
Times Square's Theater District had evolved into a business district after World War II. Nonetheless, there were relatively few large developments there in the mid-20th century. Between 1958 and 1983, only twelve buildings with at least 100,000 ft^{2} (9,300 m^{2}) of space were developed in the 114-block area between Sixth Avenue, Times Square, Eighth Avenue, and Columbus Circle. 1540 Broadway was proposed in the 1980s, when there was high demand for office space in New York City. At the time, Bruce Eichner had gained experience developing brownstone residences, condominium apartments, and the mixed-use CitySpire skyscraper. 1540 Broadway itself was constructed by Broadway State Partners, a joint venture between Eichner and VMS Development, which was formed specifically to develop that building.

=== Development ===
==== Planning ====
Initially, the partnership wanted to build a hotel. By January 1986, Broadway State Partners was acquiring land on the east side of Broadway between 45th and 46th Streets for a retail and office tower. Eichner said, "We are going to have the most innovative, most attractive, most interesting-looking building on Broadway." The next month, Eichner acquired Loew's State, with plans to build a mixed-use complex on the site. The process involved buying out the theater's 45 tenants, some of which held long-term leases. To acquire four additional plots at the center of the block, Eichner had to find the identities of every person who had held title to these properties since 1870. In December 1986, the United States government informed Eichner and VMS that it could not relocate the USO recruitment center on the site within the 90-day period given in their eviction notice. However, the USO was able to find a temporary space within two months. By the next year, Eichner and VMS were negotiating with the final landowner on the site, who was hesitant to sell. The acquisition process took over a year.

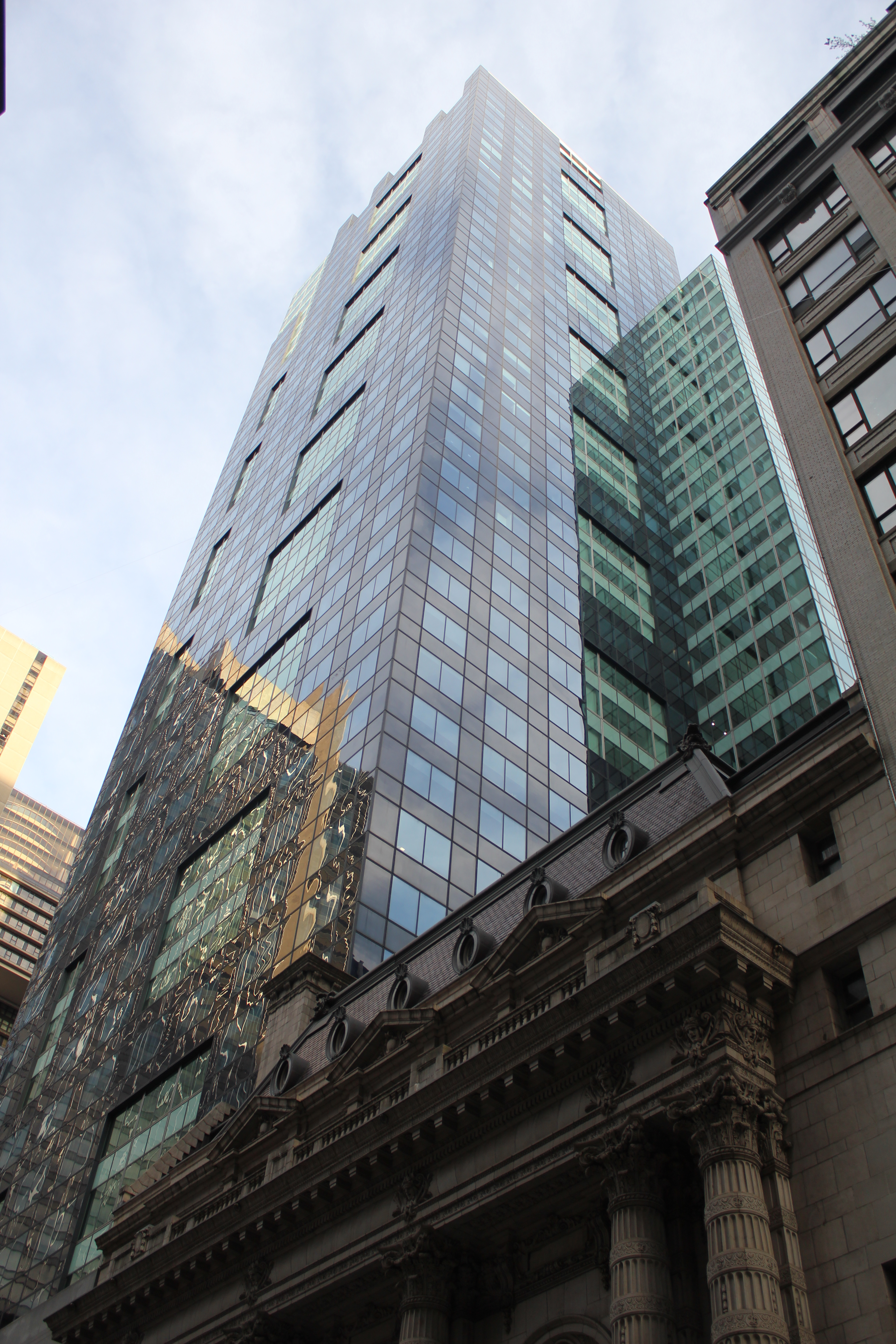
Seen from next to the Lyceum Theatre

The building was known during early planning as the Broadway State Building. It was a speculative development, as it had not been built with a commitment from a specific office tenant. Initially, Helmut Jahn (who had designed CitySpire for Eichner) would have designed 1540 Broadway. The development was to contain 58, 59, or 60 stories, with a retail atrium, a parking lot, a four-screen movie theater, office space, and 600 hotel rooms across 900,000 ft^{2} (84,000 m^{2}). The structure would cost $300 million. It would be built without tax exemptions, despite being two blocks from the 42nd Street Redevelopment Project, where builders had believed new development was infeasible unless tax exemptions were provided. To attain additional floor area, Eichner leased 124,000 ft^{2} (11,500 m^{2}) of the Lyceum Theatre's unused air development rights from the Shubert Organization.

1540 Broadway's development involved several regulations and agreements. In exchange for selling the theater, Loews had agreed to operate the movie theaters in the new building, but Eichner said he likely would have included cinemas in the project regardless of that agreement. The cinemas would contain a combined 1,700 seats. They complied with a planning regulation, adopted in 1987, which required large new developments in Times Square to set aside about 5 percent of their space for "entertainment uses". (Note: Any development under 60,000 ft^{2} (5,600 m^{2}) was exempt from the rule; for larger buildings, the first 50,000 ft^{2} (4,600 m^{2}) of a development was exempt from the bonus calculation. For example, in a building with 500,000 ft^{2} (46,000 m^{2}), the bonus calculation was derived from 5 percent of 450,000 ft^{2} (42,000 m^{2}), so the space to be set aside for entertainment uses was 22,500 ft^{2} (2,090 m^{2}).) To comply with regulations that required large signs on buildings along Times Square, the tower would also include 16,000 ft^{2} (1,500 m^{2}) of electronic signs.

==== Construction ====
By mid-1987, the Loews State Theatre was being demolished. By then, the tower was planned to be 44 stories tall, with SOM as architect. The hotel rooms were removed from the project; Eichner said that the nightly rates per room would have to be at least $200 in order to receive an adequate return on investment. This change occurred after Eichner was advised that an office building would be cheaper and just as profitable than a mixed-use development. The foundation measured about 200 by 200 feet (61 m × 61 m) across and 60 feet (18 m) deep; its construction took eight months and required excavating 50,000 cubic feet (1,400 m^{3}) of rock.

The foundation was in place by February 1988, at which point the Hahn Company signed a lease to operate a shopping mall at the base of 1540 Broadway. The builders encountered several difficulties during construction. For example, the foundation work caused cracks on the exterior of the Lyceum Theatre, a New York City designated landmark that had to be shored up. Eichner also disagreed with his architects over the materials and design, as well as with the Hahn Company over a planned screen in the shopping mall.

A design for the shopping mall, known as Metropolis Times Square, was announced in 1989. The project was also renamed One Broadway Place, despite the fact that the building was several miles from One Broadway and was not on a street called Broadway Place. By then, vacancy rates in New York City office buildings were increasing. A representative of Eichner's firm anticipated that 1540 Broadway would open before the 42nd Street Redevelopment's four large towers (Note: Now 3 Times Square, 4 Times Square, 5 Times Square, and Times Square Tower) were completed, potentially competing with Eichner's building. News America Corp. was among the companies that expressed interest in leasing space at the building, but it ultimately did not sign a lease. At the end of the year, Eichner still did not have any office tenants. He still expressed optimism, saying that Hahn was paying about as much for the retail space as an office tenant with 200,000 ft^{2} (19,000 m^{2}). Hahn was itself having trouble finding tenants for the shopping mall; after failing to convince Japanese music retailer The Wave to open a store there, it made an agreement with Musicland.

=== 1990s ===
==== Completion and insolvency ====
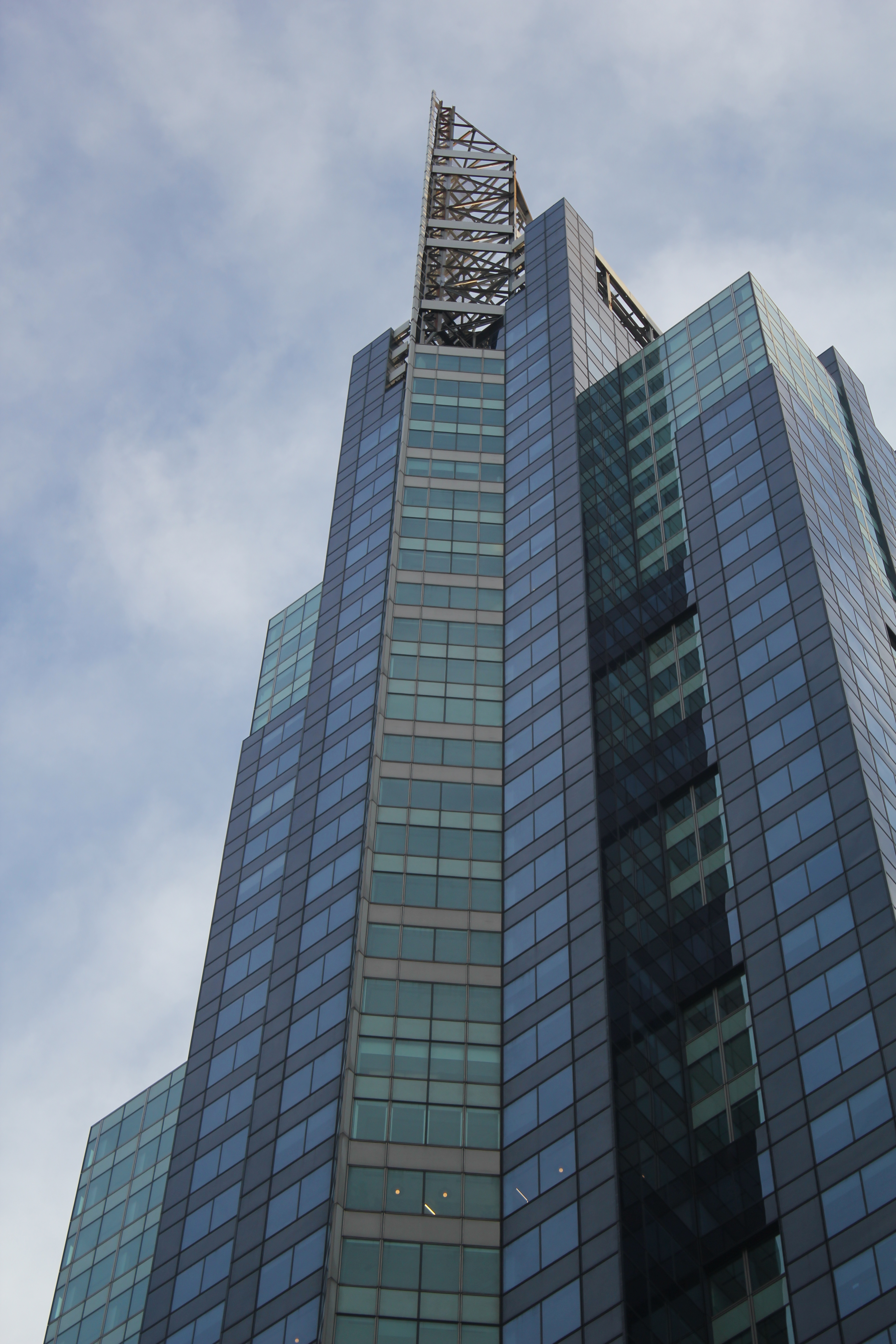
The "prow" of the building along Broadway

When 1540 Broadway was completed in 1990, it carried the address 175 West 45th Street. The building's completion coincided with the beginning of the early 1990s recession, when 14.5 percent of Manhattan office space was vacant. Furthermore, some 9 million square feet (840,000 m^{2}) of office space in the western section of Midtown had been developed in the 1980s, of which only half had been leased. Consequently, 1540 Broadway was completely empty. This was despite the fact that Cushman & Wakefield was marketing the building with a base rent of $27/ft^{2} ($290/m^{2}) and free rent on the first four months of a lease. The mall also remained unopened in March 1990, even though it had been set to open at the beginning of that year. The building occupied a location directly on Times Square, making its emptiness prominent. The nearby 1585 Broadway and 750 Seventh Avenue, two skyscrapers completed around the same time, faced similar problems, but both were at least partially occupied. Newsday described the building as "one of the most prominent financial disasters in 1980s real estate speculation".

Eichner's Broadway State Partners had incurred a deficit of $50 million, much of it related to acquisition costs. Exacerbating the building's difficulties, its financial backer VMS was facing its own financing issues. A group led by Citicorp had given Eichner a $250 million mortgage loan, (Note: Also cited as $280 million.) but the mortgage would go into default if VMS pulled out. Though Citicorp was the main lender, it had syndicated three-fourths of the loan to 16 Japanese lenders. By August 1990, Eichner was attempting to renegotiate his mortgage, and about 25 percent of the space had been committed. After the mortgage negotiations failed, the building went bankrupt, and Citicorp decided to sell the building in foreclosure. One developer had predicted that the building's cash flow would only cover half the project's cost. Hahn withdrew from its commitment to operate the building's shopping mall in February 1991, citing the continuing delays.

By mid-1991, Bertelsmann was in negotiations to lease 250,000 to 500,000 ft^{2} (23,000 to 46,000 m^{2}). The company occupied 666 Fifth Avenue, where it was forced to pay a relatively high $40/ft^{2} ($430/m^{2}) for the next nine years, and 1133 Avenue of the Americas, where the lease was only $17/ft^{2} ($180/m^{2}) and expired in three years. The company had negotiated to rent space at several buildings, but their landlords all balked at Bertelsmann's request to pay off the 666 Fifth lease. In July 1991, Eichner said he was negotiating with two tenants "that would commit to all or substantially all of the building". The next month, Citicorp identified a potential buyer: Bertelsmann, which had initially made a relatively low offer of $100 million, though Citicorp rejected this offer. An independent consultant for Citicorp subsequently recalled that the deal would have allowed Bertelsmann to buy only 1540 Broadway's office floors, leaving Citicorp with both the 666 Fifth lease and the empty 1540 Broadway retail section. Further complicating matters, Citigroup and all 16 Japanese lenders would have to agree on any deal involving the building's sale. As one publication wrote in late 1991: "A handwritten sign on a door—'Not in Use'—might serve as the building's epitaph."

==== Bertelsmann purchase and retail ====
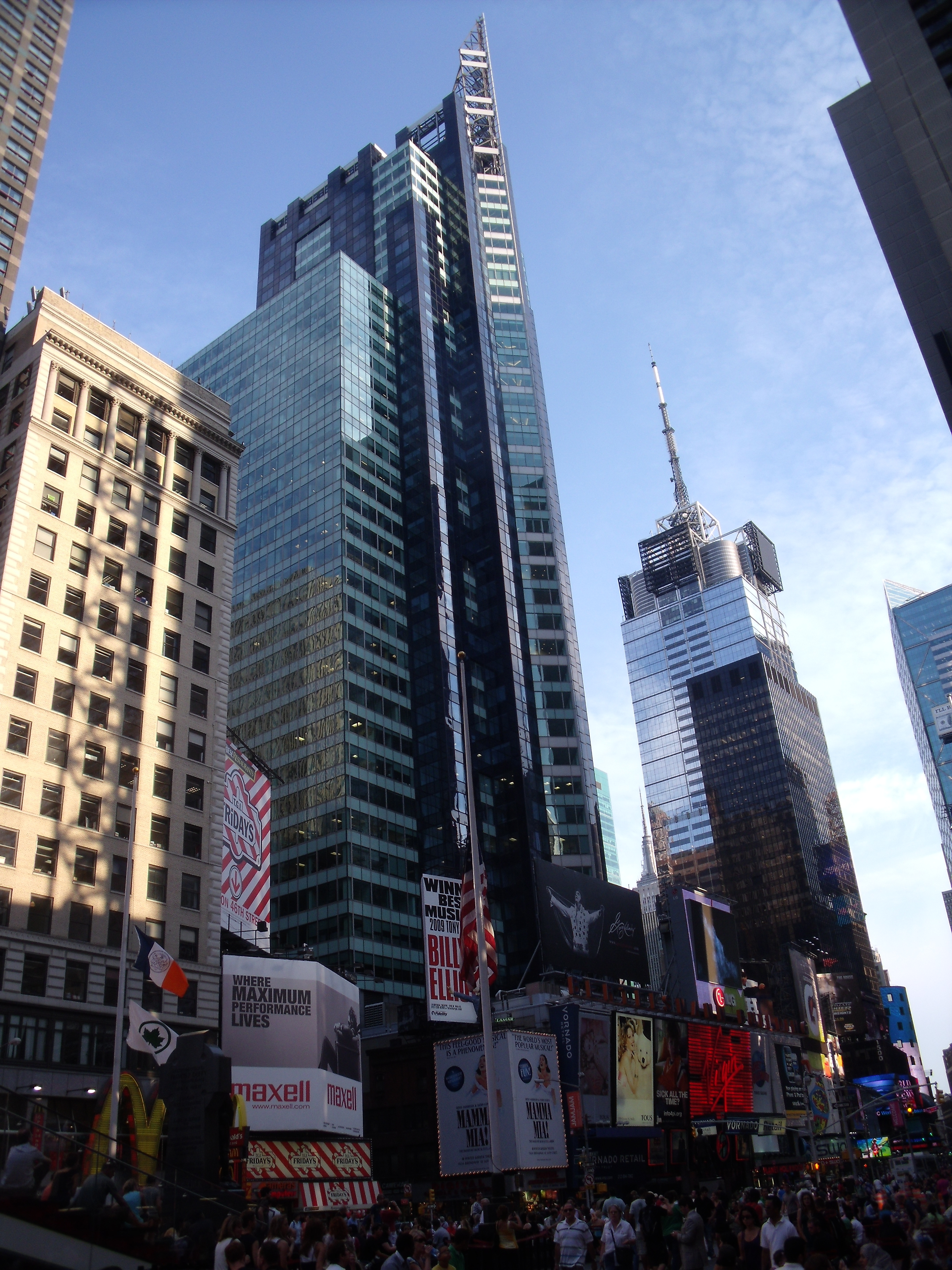
1540 Broadway as seen at center, with the Actors Equity Building and 1552 Broadway at left and 4 Times Square at right

In March 1992, Bertelsmann agreed to pay $119 million for the building, less than half the value of the foreclosed mortgage, in exchange for $10 million in tax incentives and $1 million in deferred taxes. The sale involved the entire building, including the abandoned retail section. All the prior equity invested in the project was canceled out, representing a total loss of around $200 million. Bertelsmann committed to keeping 1,750 workers in the building for 15 years, including 500 jobs that would have otherwise been relocated to Chicago. The firm would occupy about two-thirds of the space and rent the remainder out. Douglas Durst, who owned one of Bertelsmann's former spaces in 1133 Avenue of the Americas, opposed the tax incentives and threatened to sue. The sale nonetheless spurred a revival of Times Square in the 1990s, which was hastened in 1993 when financial firm Morgan Stanley bought the nearby 1585 Broadway. Bertelsmann was one of several foreign firms that had bought large amounts of office space in New York City, where property values per square foot tended to be cheaper than in other large cities such as London, Paris, and Tokyo.

Bertelsmann planned to conduct $50 million worth of improvements, including adding a 25,000 ft^{2} (2,300 m^{2}) or 50,000 ft^{2} (4,600 m^{2}) "incubator" for small foreign companies. By late 1992, the building was about to recover from the Chapter 11 bankruptcy proceeding brought against it. The next year, Bertelsmann occupied all but 150,000 ft^{2} (14,000 m^{2}) of the office floors. 1540 Broadway, renamed the Bertelsmann Building, housed the U.S. locations of Bertelsmann's central offices, as well as the Bertelsmann Music Group and Bertelsmann Book Group (later Random House). The city government leased space on two stories for an incubator. Bertelsmann built production rooms within the building, but it did not add live-recording studios to replace the former Bertelsmann Music Group studios at 1133 Avenue of the Americas. The company added two signs to the building, supplementing the signs that already existed; senior vice president Christopher Alpers said the signage was added "because it's lively and goes well with the entertainment industry we operate in".

Although the retail space was empty a year after Bertelsmann purchased the building, the company planned to find "quality" tenants for the space, specifically excluding amusement arcades. Musicland, Tower Records, and HMV all declined to open a store at the Bertelsmann Building but former HMV executive Tony Hirsch brought Virgin Group as a tenant. By late 1993, Virgin and Blockbuster were negotiating to lease some space in the base. The next year, Bertelsmann announced that three tenants had been secured for the atrium: the Virgin Megastore, the Official All Star Café, and Loews successor Sony Theaters. GMO International was hired to build the retail spaces. The All Star Café opened in December 1995, and the Virgin megastore opened in April 1996, along with the Sony Theatres State 4 cinema the same month. World Wrestling Entertainment had also attempted unsuccessfully to open a location within the Bertelsmann Building.

By 1997, the Bertelsmann Building was worth three times its original purchase price. Bertelsmann's Random House division was split between 1540 Broadway and another building on 50th Street. To consolidate Random House's space, Bertelsmann planned to erect a skyscraper across 45th Street, connected with the Bertelsmann Building via a neon-lighted bridge. Bertelsmann began negotiating with the site owner, Charles B. Moss Jr., but the negotiations failed in November 1998, and the Random House Tower was built ten blocks uptown. The All Star Café was struggling financially by 1999, and the Sony theater also faced financial difficulties after the Loews 42nd Street E Walk opened that year. However, the building's Virgin Megastore was grossing millions of dollars in profit every week.

=== 2000s ===
Electronic signs were installed on the Bertelsmann Building in 2001, replacing the original signs, and the BMG studio in the building closed the same year. Law firm Pillsbury Winthrop Shaw Pittman leased six floors in 2003, though it did not officially move in until the next year. Financial services company PricewaterhouseCoopers also expressed interest in occupying space within the building. A piece of sheet metal fell off the Bertelsmann Building in April 2003, injuring two pedestrians. That June, Bertelsmann indicated that it would place the building for sale but that it would continue to occupy the space.

Bertelsmann sold the building in 2004 to the Paramount Group for $426.5 million, though Bertelsmann continued to occupy two-fifths of the building. At the time, 1540 Broadway was 75 percent occupied. Viacom leased 305,000 ft^{2} (28,335 m^{2}) across ten floors in 2005. Sony's basement movie theater ultimately closed in early 2006, and law firms Duane Morris, Whatley Drake & Kallas, and Hodgson Russ also leased several floors that year. In July 2006, Paramount sold the office section of 1540 Broadway to real estate investment trust Equity Office Properties for $525.1 million. Vornado Realty Trust simultaneously bought the retail section, including the signs and the basement parking garage, for $260 million. By then, the stores were 60 percent occupied, with Virgin and Planet Hollywood occupying the retail space, while the offices were almost fully occupied. Toilet paper brand Charmin also leased one of the storefronts in 2006, installing twenty temporary public restrooms for the Times Square Ball drop. Charmin sponsored temporary restrooms again in 2007.

Harry B. Macklowe bought 1540 Broadway's office portion in February 2007 as part of a $7 billion transaction involving six of Equity Office's other buildings. Macklowe valued the building at $925 million to $950 million. He took out a $7.6 billion loan to fund the acquisitions, which was to come due within twelve months. Macklowe personally pledged $1 billion, as well as interests in twelve other properties, as a guarantee. By February 2008, the Macklowe Organization had no way to refinance the debt from the previous year. As such, Macklowe surrendered 1540 Broadway to his lender, Deutsche Bank. Macklowe had acquired 1540 Broadway at $1,000/ft^{2} ($11,000/m^{2}), but he was having trouble selling even at $400 to $450/ft^{2} ($4,300 to $4,800/m^{2}). While the building had been 84 percent occupied in 2007, the occupancy rate had dropped to 78 percent within two years, and Macklowe had only been able to sign three leases during that time. In 2009, CBRE bought 1540 Broadway's office section for $355 million, paying $392/ft^{2} ($4,220/m^{2}). CBRE converted the eighth floor into an amenity room, and it increased occupancy rates from 78 to 85 percent within a year. The Virgin Megastore at the base also closed in 2009.

=== 2010s to present ===
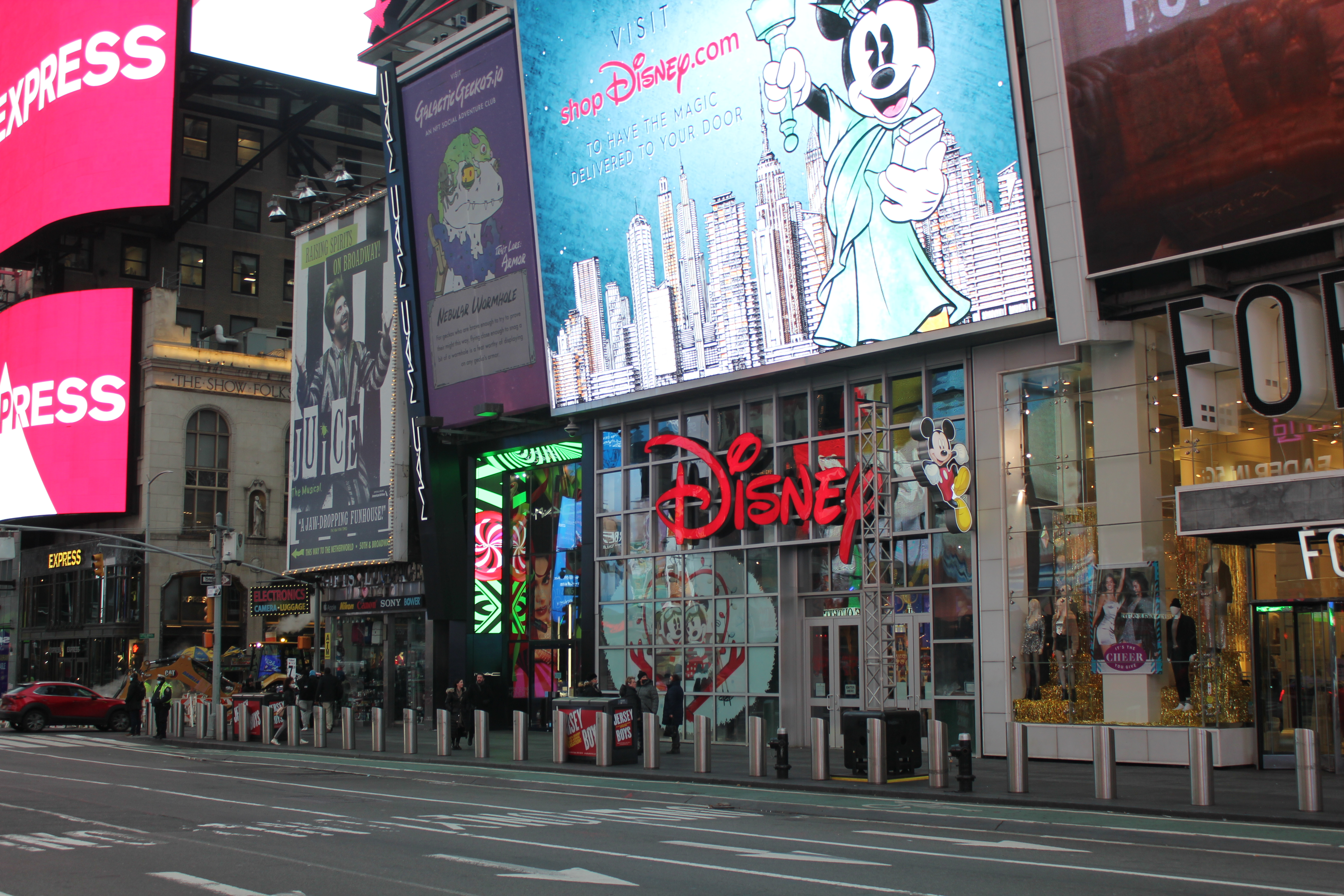
Retail stores at the base

A Disney Store opened within the former Virgin Megastore space in 2010, along with a Forever 21 store. The Forever 21 outlet alone was projected to draw 100,000 daily visitors, more than the Statue of Liberty. Adobe Inc. and Xinhua News Agency both took office space the same year. A joint venture of Edge Fund Advisors and HSBC Alternative Investments Ltd. bought a 49 percent stake in the Bertelsmann Building in late 2010, paying CBRE $254 million. The next year, Edge and HSBC bought the remaining 51 percent ownership stake for $270 million. Mark Keller of Edge said he intentionally chose to buy the Bertelsmann Building in two phases. Keller said that he had been "jealous" when CBRE bought the building from Macklowe, calling it a "great transaction". MetLife gave Edge and HSBC a $350 million mortgage on the Bertelsmann Building. Vornado leased the remaining retail space to the Sunglass Hut in 2013, and Vornado also arranged for a new sign to be installed on the building the same year.

In 2016, Edge refinanced 1540 Broadway with a $451 million mortgage from DekaBank. The next year, Edge and HSBC placed a 48 percent ownership stake in the building on the market. The owners renovated 1540 Broadway in 2019 for $40 million. The renovation included an eighth-floor amenity room, new elevators, a restored office entrance on 45th Street, and a cogeneration plant. More than 190,000 ft^{2} (18,000 m^{2}) of space on the 18th to 24th floors was overhauled in 2019, while 278,000 ft^{2} (25,800 m^{2}) on the 26th to 35th floors was scheduled to be completed two years later. Adobe expanded its space in 2019, and pharmaceutical company Schrödinger signed a lease for several floors in April 2021. Planet Hollywood fell behind on its rent in 2018 and stopped paying completely during the COVID-19 pandemic, prompting Vornado to sue Planet Hollywood in 2020. The Planet Hollywood location at 1540 Broadway closed after its lease expired in August 2021, leaving Planet Hollywood without a location in New York City. Edge Fund Advisors refinanced the building for $590 million in April 2022, and Pandora moved its North American headquarters to the building that December.

== Reception ==
During 1540 Broadway's construction, Karrie Jacobs wrote that the design is "a building so divided between the subdued aesthetics of premium office space and an attempt to cash in on the mythology of Times Square that it's positively schizophrenic", though she thought this quality aligned with the "craziness of Times Square itself". According to Crain's New York magazine, the blue-and-green glass facade gave the tower a "plaid" look. Claudia Deutsch of The New York Times described the building's "green tint and striking prow" as "highlighting its million square feet of bulk". Eve M. Kahn of The Wall Street Journal said: "Skidmore Owings & Merrill's 1540 Broadway [...] cannot relate to its neighbors", part of a trend in which "all the area's new construction clashes violently" with Times Square's existing architecture. Kahn particularly lamented the empty retail space as "most bombastic and now most miserable" out of all the new projects on Times Square.

When 1540 Broadway was completed, architect and writer Robert A. M. Stern described its initial lack of tenants as "a perfect metaphor for the excesses of real estate in the 1980s". The building's bankruptcy led journalist Jerry Adler to publish a book about the building in 1993, entitled High Rise: How 1,000 Men and Women Worked Around the Clock for Five Years and Lost $200 Million Building a Skyscraper. Adler's book had been possible because, unlike other developers of unsuccessful buildings, Eichner and his partners were willing to speak publicly about 1540 Broadway. David W. Dunlap wrote of the book: "On learning about the coincidences, accidents and sheer chance that shaped [1540 Broadway], one marvels that anything got built at all."

== See also ==
- List of tallest buildings in New York City
- List of tallest buildings in the United States
