= The Manhattan Club (hotel) =

Hotel in Manhattan, New York

General information
- Type: Hotel
- Architectural style: Renaissance revival
- Location: 200 West 56th Street, Midtown Manhattan, New York City, New York, U.S.
- Coordinates: 40.76500°N 73.98114°W
- Completed: 1926 (100 years ago)
- Opened: 1996 (30 years ago)

Technical details
- Floor count: 30

Design and construction
- Architects: Gronenberg & Leuchtag

The Manhattan Club is a 30-story, 286-room hotel located at 200 West 56th Street and 7th Avenue in Midtown Manhattan, New York City. It was originally part of (and is still in the same building as) the Park Central Hotel, a Renaissance Revival-style building opened on June 12, 1927. The Park Central Hotel's entrance is on 7th Avenue but a door in the lobby of the Manhattan Club also provides access to it. Unlike the Park Central, the rooms, which are all suites, in the Manhattan Club are timeshares. They have the option to be fully deeded. The Manhattan Club was the first urban timeshare in the United States. (The nearby 28-story West 57th Street by Hilton Club was the first purpose-built timeshare in New York City.)

== History ==
A junior suite at the Manhattan Club

Ian Bruce Eichner purchased the Park Central Hotel in 1995, when it was named Omni Park Central. Eichner decided to leave the Omni chain and revert the hotel to its original name, Park Central. The following year, he converted half the hotel's 1,450 rooms into the Manhattan Club, a 266-unit, all-suite timeshare development. The project cost around $70 million.

In 2014, Eric Schneiderman, Attorney General of New York, halted the sale of timeshares at the Manhattan Club, via a court order, after buyers filed complaints of being misled and running into issues reserving rooms for which they believed they had paid. It followed another lawsuit three years earlier in which five timeshare owners sued Eichner for fraud. In 2017, the New York District Attorney announced a settlement with Eichner over his misleading claims and false promises related to the Manhattan Club timeshare. Eichner and his associates offered a "boutique hotel" but many customers were never able to book rooms, faced rapidly rising maintenance costs, and were foreclosed if they were unable to pay, leading others to sell their shares for $1. Eichner and associates, including his brother, Stuart, were required to pay $6.5 million as part of the settlement and were barred from the timeshare industry.

In 2018, Florida-based Bluegreen Vacations purchased the inventory and management contract of the Manhattan Club.
