= Thompson Central Park New York Hotel =

Hotel in Manhattan, New York

Thompson Central Park New York
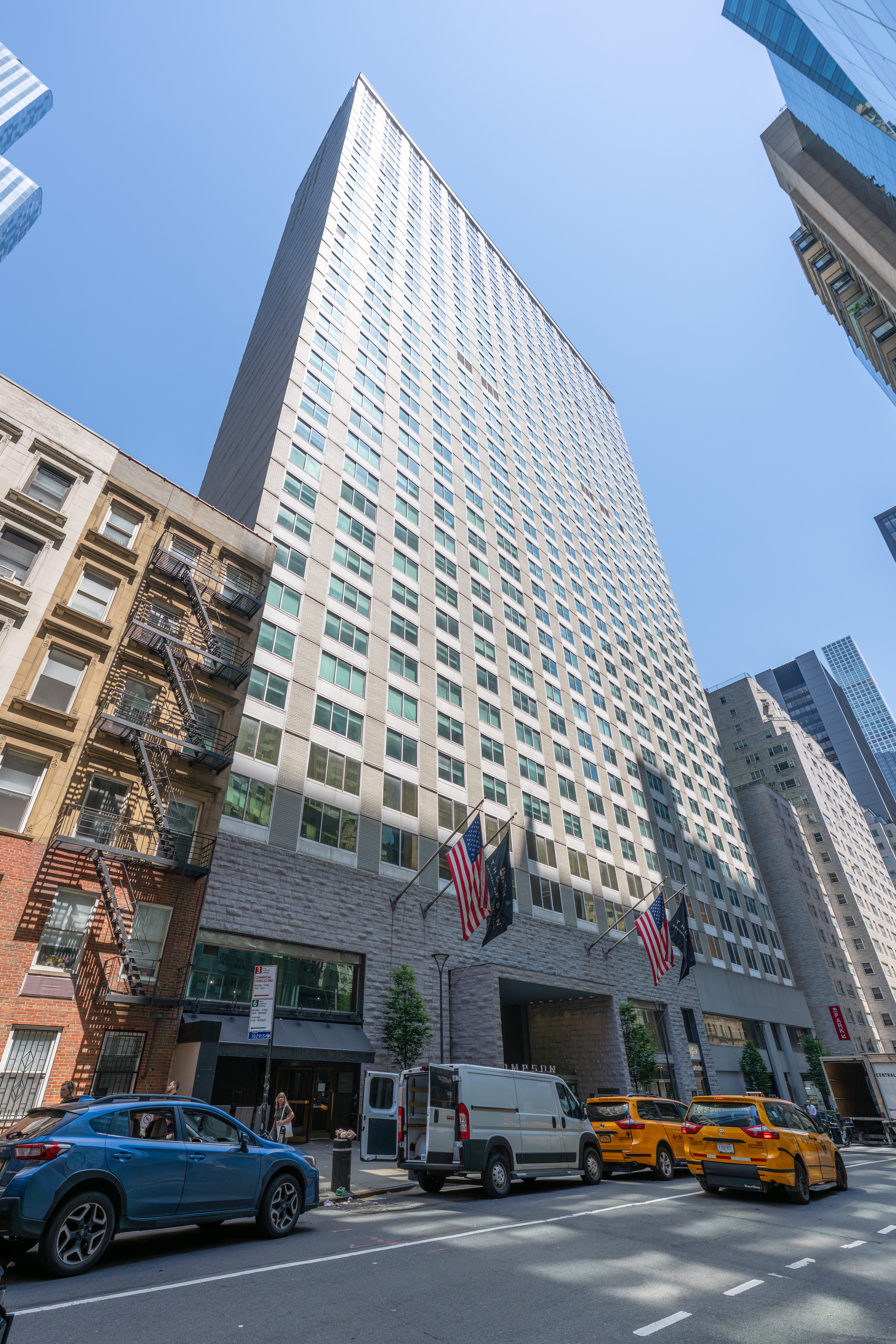
- As seem from 56th Street (2026)
- Interactive map of the Thompson Central Park New York area
- Former names: Le Parker Meridien, Parker New York

General information
- Location: 119 West 56th Street, New York City, United States
- Coordinates: 40°45′51.9″N 73°58′42.5″W
- Opened: March 13, 1981
- Renovated: 2020–2022

Technical details
- Floor count: 42

Design and construction
- Architect: Philip Birnbaum

Other information
- Number of rooms: 587

Website
- www.hyatt.com/hotel/new-york/thompson-central-park-new-york/lgatp

The Thompson Central Park New York is a 587-room hotel located at 56th Street in Midtown Manhattan, New York City. Located near Central Park, the 42-story hotel building houses restaurants, a gym, and other retailers.

== History ==
The hotel opened on March 13, 1981, as the Hotel Parker Meridien New York. The hotel opened on Friday the thirteenth, a date considered lucky in France. Because the date is considered unlucky in the U.S., however, the actual grand opening celebration was held a week later, on Friday March 20, 1981. The hotel was developed by the New York-based Jack Parker Corporation and managed by Air France's Meridien Hotels division. In 1979, the New York City Department of City Planning gave Parker permission to construct a 40-story building, eight floors past the 32-story maximum for a building with that lot area, provided that the corporation add a public atrium. The hotel was later slightly renamed, becoming Le Parker Méridien New York. The atrium seating was removed in 1990, and subsequently restored after a "high-profile" campaign by the New York City Department of Buildings. Under the Parker Corporation's management, Le Parker Meridien was one of the few luxury hotels in the city that accommodated wild animals as guests. In 2012, the hotel's coffee bar was flooded with concrete following a construction accident at a neighboring building.

The hotel, along with its sister Le Parker Méridien property in Palm Springs, left Le Méridien (by that point, a division of Starwood) in January 2018, and the hotel was renamed Parker New York Hotel. GFI Capital Resources Group and Elliott Management Corporation purchased the hotel for approximately $420 million in 2019. The companies planned a $100 million renovation, along with the conversion of a portion to private residences, and the potential addition of 67 luxury condos atop the existing structure. The hotel joined the Thompson Hotels division of Hyatt as Thompson Central Park New York on November 1, 2021. In September 2024, Gencom bought the hotel for around $310 million.

== Facilities ==
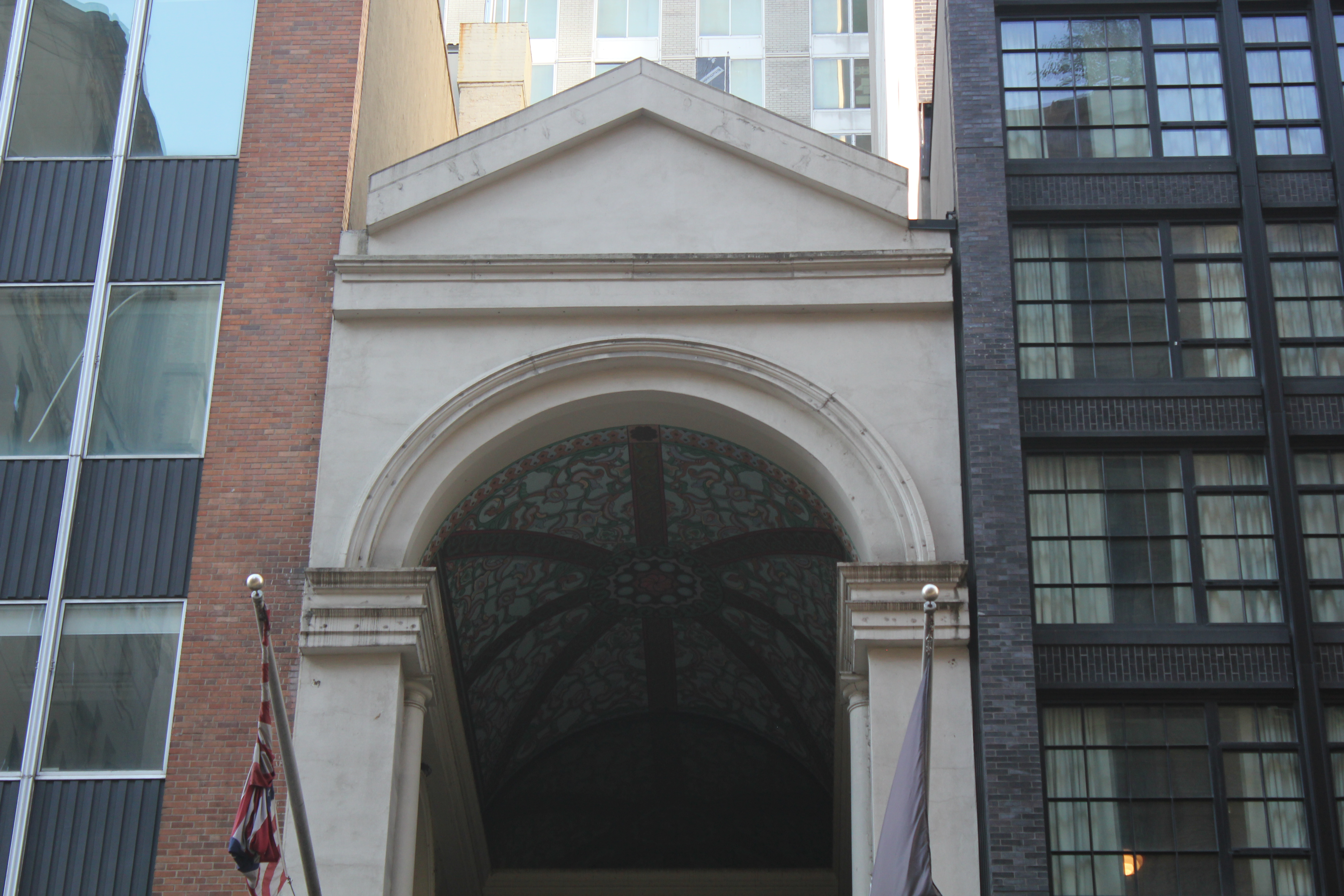
Secondary entrance, 57th Street

One of the hotel's restaurants is Burger Joint, a "speakeasy-style burger hut" behind the hotel's lobby curtain. The restaurant opened in 2002 and has since expanded to other locations. Burger Joint was ranked number two in Eater New York's list of the "27 Top Burgers in NYC". People often queue in the restaurant's entrance corridor, which is marked by a simple neon sign of a hamburger.

== Reception ==
Douglas Rogers of The Daily Telegraph rated the hotel 8 out of 10 and summarized, "At first glance this Midtown hotel seems like a nondescript commercial tower block, but once inside a myriad of resort-like treats await. Aside from sprawling guest rooms there's a barbershop, makeup salon, spa, rooftop pool and – the ultimate gem – world famous Burger Joint." Parker New York ranked number 118 on U.S. News & World Report's list of "Best New York City Hotels". Jessica Colley Clarke of Fodor's rated Le Parker Meridien as 4.5 out of 5 stars, and Frommer's rated Parker New York 2 out of 3 stars.

The Evening Standard's Lauren Keary included the Parker in her list of "best pools in NYC". Lorna Parkes of The Independent described the hotel as "a Hyatt with subtle style" and a "secret burger joint". The Daily Telegraph's Tracy Kaler included the Parker in her 2020 list of "8 fabulous family-friendly hotels in New York".
