= Ian Bruce Eichner =

American businessman

- Born: June 25, 1946 (age 80); New York City, New York
- Education: B.A. University at Buffalo; J.D. University of Cincinnati College of Law
- Occupation: Real Estate Developer
- Known for: founder of The Continuum Company, LLC
- Spouse: Leslie Ann Hollander
- Children: Lindsay Eichner, Alexandra Eichner

Ian Bruce Eichner (born June 25, 1945) is an American real estate developer and founder of The Continuum Company, LLC.

== Biography ==
Eichner was born to a Jewish family in New York City. His father went to fight in World War II and abandoned the family thereafter. His stepfather, Herman Eichner, was an Austrian immigrant and professor. He went to Stuyvesant High School and worked for Republic Steel while in high school and Sears Roebuck while in college. In 1962, he attended the University of New Mexico for a year and the graduated from the University at Buffalo with a B.A. in history and then with a J.D. from the University of Cincinnati College of Law in 1969. He then took a job with the office of district attorney Frank Hogan and then as an assistant district attorney in Brooklyn with Eugene Gold.

In 1969, he purchased and renovated his first building in Park Slope, Brooklyn on borrowed money. Using the proceeds from the sale of his first building, he started buying apartment buildings in Park Slope and converting them into cooperatives. From 1971 to 1975, he worked for the New York State Division of Criminal Justice services. He purchased the Franklin Arms in Brooklyn Heights which he profited $1 million and lost it all after purchasing the Hotel Margaret in Brooklyn Heights which burned to the ground after a construction accident. He ultimately built a new building on the site and made his money back. A mentor of his, Ron Altman, introduced him to Victor Smorgon of Melbourne, Australia who invested $4 million to build a high rise. He had several novel ideas in the buildings he built thereafter: he built buildings with the smallest units on the lower floors and the larger units on the taller floors; and he built the lobbies first (as people want to see the lobby before they move in); and he would build model apartments on the higher floors (with their spectacular views). Smorgon's investment was profitable and Eichner went on to build CitySpire, 1540 Broadway, 180 Montague in Brooklyn Heights (later sold to Charles E. Smith's Archstone), and the Continuum on South Beach in Miami Beach. The 1990s were difficult and Eichner lost CitySpire to the Bank of Nova Scotia, 1540 Broadway to bankruptcy and ultimately to Bertelsmann A.G. as its headquarters, and the Cosmopolitan of Las Vegas, a $4 billion project, to Deutsche Bank after he was unable to refinance a loan (it was ultimately completed and sold it to the Blackstone Group.

He developed 45 East 22nd Street, a 777 feet tall, 64 story tower in the Flatiron District of Manhattan. Eichner also developed a 32-story tower in Harlem, which will be the neighborhood's tallest building, and is proposing to construct four high-rise apartment complexes in Crown Heights, Brooklyn. The latter development has notably gained criticism from Brooklyn Botanic Garden President Scot Medbury for the impacts that the high rises could have on the direct sun light of the gardens.

=== Manhattan Club settlement ===
The Manhattan Club in Midtown Manhattan

In 2017, the New York District Attorney announced a settlement with Eichner over his misleading claims and false promises related to The Manhattan Club timeshare. Eichner and his associates offered a "boutique hotel" but many customers were never able to book rooms, faced rapidly rising maintenance costs, and were foreclosed if they were unable to pay, leading others to sell their shares for $1. Eichner and associates were required to pay $6.5 million as part of the settlement and were barred from the timeshare industry.

== Personal life ==
He was briefly married during college.

He is currently married to his second wife, Leslie Ann (née Hollander) Eichner. They have two daughters. He has homes in East Hampton, New York, Las Vegas, and South Beach.
