= The Belnord =

Condominium building in Manhattan, New York

- Belnord Apartments
- U.S. National Register of Historic Places
- New York State Register of Historic Places
- New York City Landmark
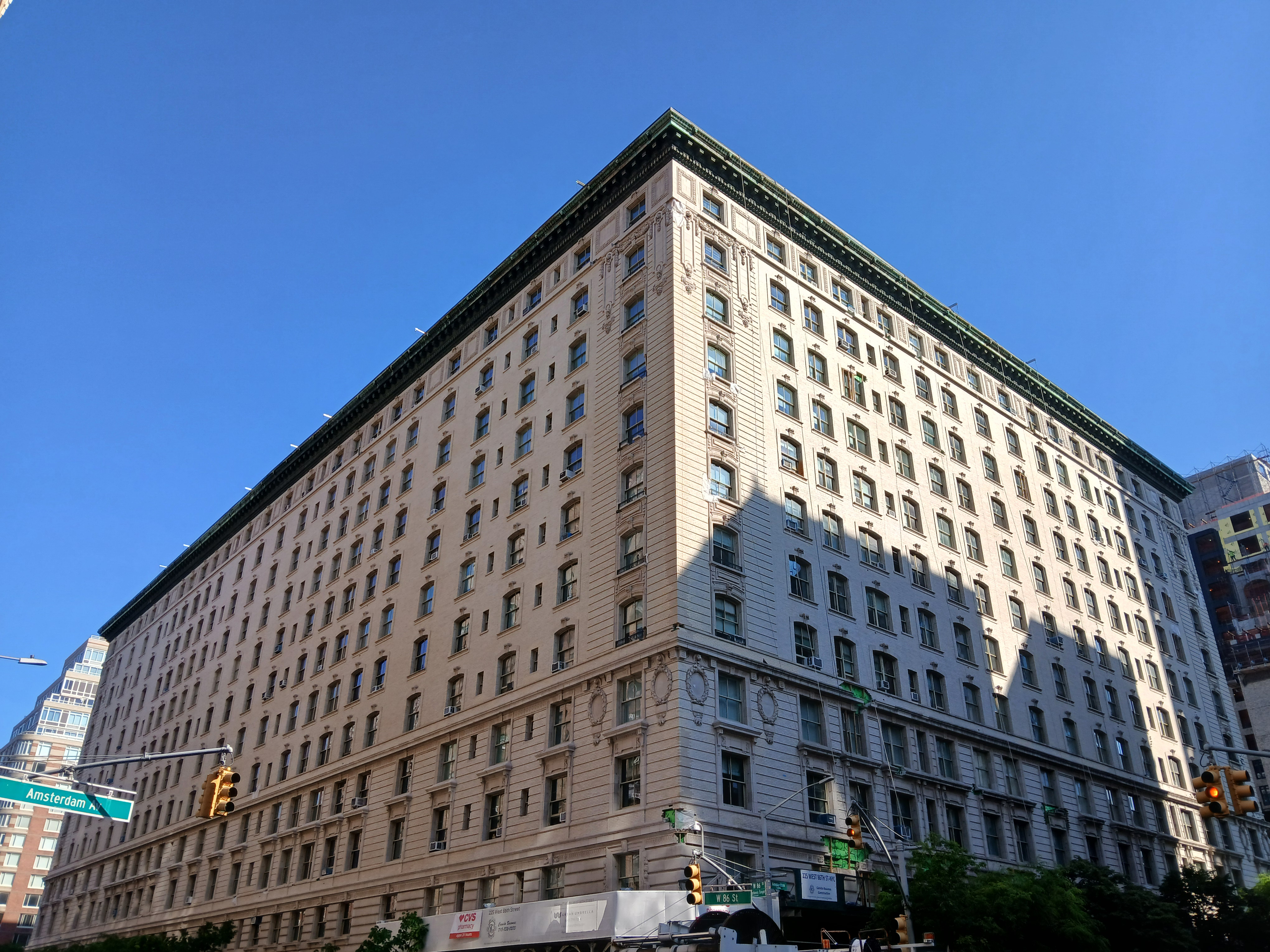
- Seen from Amsterdam Avenue and 86th Street
- Location: 225 West 86th Street; Manhattan, New York, US
- Coordinates: 40°47′18″N 73°58′34″W
- Area: 2 acres (0.81 ha)
- Built: 1908
- Architects: Weekes, H. Hobart
- Architectural style: Late 19th And 20th Century Revivals, Italian Renaissance
- NRHP reference No.: 80002670
- NYSRHP No.: 06101.000103
- NYCL No.: 0289

Significant dates
- Added to NRHP: April 23, 1980
- Designated NYSRHP: June 23, 1980
- Designated NYCL: September 20, 1966

The Belnord is a condominium building at 225 West 86th Street on the Upper West Side of Manhattan in New York City, New York, United States. The 13-story structure was designed by Hiss and Weekes in the Italian Renaissance Revival style and occupies the full block between Broadway, Amsterdam Avenue, and 86th and 87th Streets. It was built between 1908 and 1909 by a syndicate of investors as a rental apartment building. The Belnord is a New York City designated landmark and is listed on the National Register of Historic Places.

The building occupies a nearly rectangular site and has a limestone and brick facade, which is divided horizontally into three sections. On 86th Street, a pair of arches at the center of the facade lead to an internal courtyard with a garden, driveway, and entrances to the apartments. The Belnord contains six entrances, each of which lead to a different set of apartments, and originally had a mechanical plant in the basement, as well as amenities such as horse stables and storage rooms. The building originally had 175 apartments, which were designed in the Louis XVI style. The apartments generally had multiple rooms and faced both the courtyard and the street. By the 1940s, the building had 225 units; this was further increased to 231 condominium units by the late 2010s. The design of the apartments dates to a 2010s renovation by Robert A. M. Stern.

A group of investors acquired the site from the Hoyt family in 1908 and developed the Belnord there. When the building was completed in October 1909, it was characterized as the United States' largest apartment building. The Belnord was sold multiple times in the 1920s before being acquired by the City Bank-Farmers Trust Company in 1935. The bank sold the building in 1945, and the Belnord fell into disrepair during the next several decades. Between the 1970s and 1990s, the tenants were involved in multiple disputes with then-owner Lillian Seril, and many residents refused to pay rent because of the Belnord's poor condition. Property Markets Group and Gary Barnett bought the Belnord in 1994, and Barnett spent over $100 million on renovations. Barnett's Extell Development Company sold the apartments in 2015 to the HFZ Capital Group, which converted many apartments to condominium units starting in 2017. Westbrook Partners took over the project by early 2021 and had sold 80% of the units by the next year.

== Site ==
The Belnord is located at 225 West 86th Street on the Upper West Side of Manhattan in New York City, New York, United States. It occupies the entirety of a city block bounded by Broadway to the west, 87th Street to the north, Amsterdam Avenue to the east, and 86th Street to the south. The building is cited as having frontage of approximately 201 feet (61 m) on Broadway and Amsterdam Avenue, 343 feet (105 m) on 86th Street, and 328 feet (100 m) on 87th Street. (Note: Belnord Partners LLC 2016, p. 54, gives a different figure of 213 feet (65 m) on Broadway and Amsterdam Avenue, 354 feet (108 m) on 86th Street, and 339 feet (103 m) on 87th Street.) The site is variously cited as covering 64,614 square feet (6,003 m^{2}), 67,614 ft^{2} (6,282 m^{2}), or 68,943 square feet (6,405.0 m^{2}); the New York City Department of City Planning cites the plot as covering 67,674 square feet (6,287 m^{2}).

The building is opposite the West-Park Presbyterian Church to the east and St. Paul's Methodist Church to the west. An entrance to the New York City Subway's 86th Street station, serving the 1 train, is directly outside the southwestern corner of the building. The Belnord is one of a few full-block apartment buildings in New York City, with its structure occupying about two-thirds of its site and a 22,000-square-foot (2,000 m^{2}) center courtyard making up the balance. The Belnord's arrangement is similar to that of the Apthorp, another large apartment building on Broadway and 79th Street built during the early 20th century.

== Architecture ==
The Belnord was designed by H. Hobart Weekes of the architectural firm of Hiss and Weekes, and it was completed in 1909. It is 13 stories tall and features Italian Renaissance Revival style decorative elements. The architect boasted to The New York Times that it was the "largest apartment building in the country, and maybe the world." Its design features, such as an interior courtyard, bay windows, and large apartments, were intended to evoke those of the Dakota apartment building and to attract wealthy tenants who had been unable to move to it. The George A. Fuller Company was the general contractor for the Belnord's construction. The modern design of the interior dates to a 2010s renovation by Robert A. M. Stern.

=== Form and facade ===
The facade is divided horizontally into three sections: a five-story base, a seven-story shaft, and a one-story upper portion. The first three stories of the base have a rusticated limestone facade, above which is a horizontal band course. The fourth and fifth stories are clad with brick and are topped by another band course. The facade of the midsection is also made of brick, except at the corners, which contain vertically arranged quoins. The outermost bays are wider than the others on the facade and are flanked by the quoins. A third band course runs above the twelfth floor. The top story contains decorative panels between each window; above it is a cornice with dentils. The windows are of varying sizes and contain classical decoration. The interior facade, facing the courtyard, is made of terracotta and brick.

==== Entrances and courtyard ====
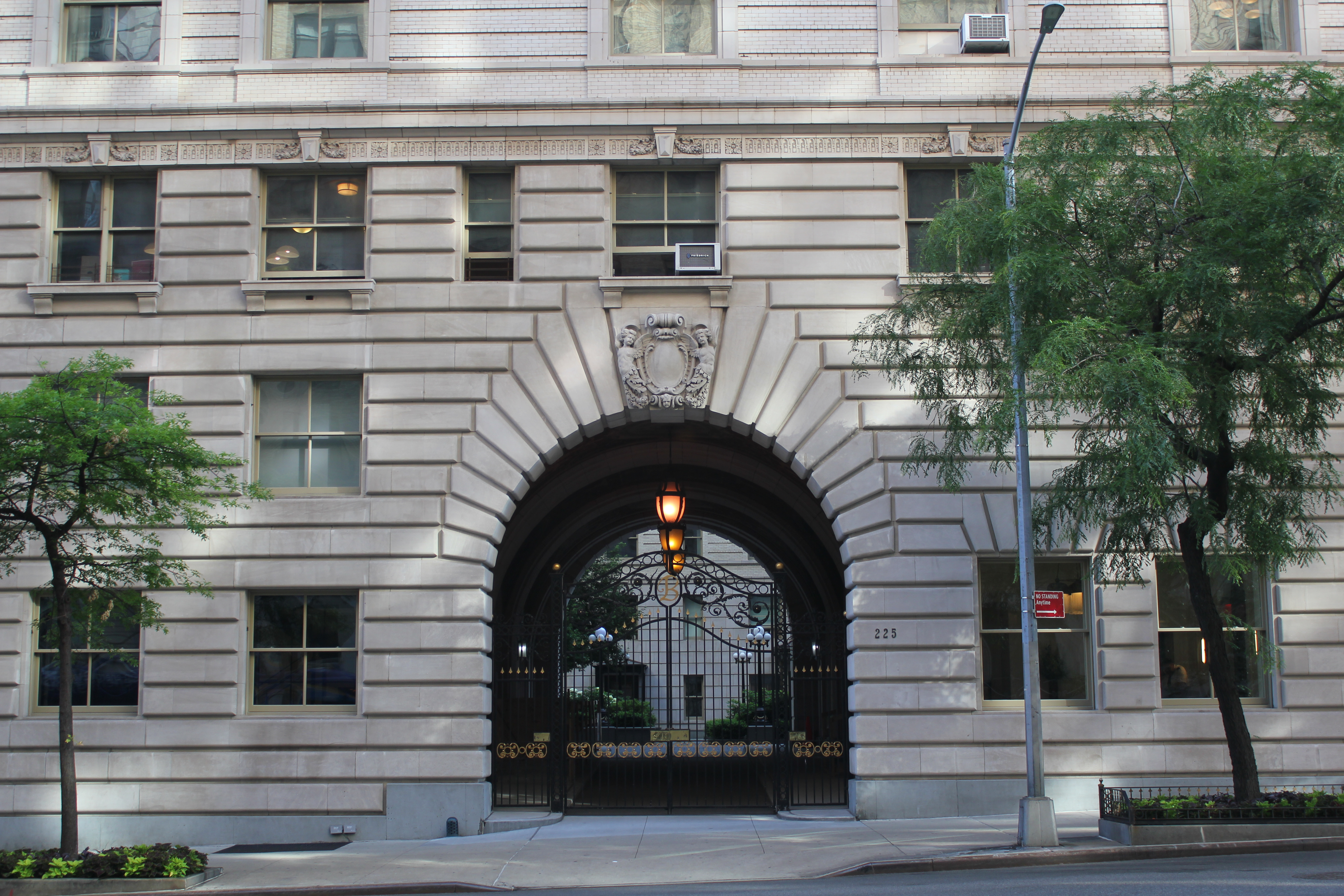
View of one of the 86th Street archways

The Belnord contains two entrances, one each on 86th and 87th Street, which lead to six residential lobbies. The main entrance is via two massive, double-height grand archways on 86th Street, which lead to an interior courtyard. There are keystones with cartouches above each archway. The undersides of the archways contain barrel-vaulted ceilings and multicolored frescoes, as well as three lanterns. The writer Elizabeth Hawes said the barrel vault "amounted to an architectural rite of passage", separating the enclosed courtyard from the wide-open cityscape.

The courtyard is one of the largest in the city and was, at the time of its construction, the largest interior court in the world. It measures 231 feet (70 m) long and is either 94 feet (29 m) or 98 feet (30 m) wide. (Note: Cleveland 1909, p. 323 gives dimensions of 50 by 300 feet (15 by 91 m) and an area of 2,200 square feet (200 m^{2}); these measurements not only contradict each other but also the dimensions given by other sources.) A 23-foot-wide (7.0 m) driveway leads to the courtyard; the driveway was originally paved in oak blocks as a sound-damping measure. Inside the courtyard are three landscaped gardens, including a small garden surrounded by an iron fence and illuminated by a dozen ornamental street lamps. The garden was decorated with shrubs and trees, and has a center fountain. Early 20th-century photographs of the courtyard indicate that it contained four small patches of grass with a skylight in the middle. There are entrances to the courtyard at each corner of the building. Originally, there were six, with one on the north side of the courtyard and the other between the two driveways to the south.

The 87th Street side contained a 14-foot (4.3 m) wide driveway which lead to a service area under the courtyard. When the building opened, all delivery vehicles were required to use it to keep freight traffic away from 86th Street, a major thoroughfare. Elevators carried freight from the service area to a vestibule just outside each room.

=== Features ===
==== Mechanical features ====
The basement accommodated dozens of mechanical staff. The Belnord originally had its own mechanical plant in the basement, which was placed directly beneath the courtyard to minimize vibrations within each apartment. The pump and engine room contained three generators, each with a total capacity of 1,060 horsepower (790 kW). The boiler room contained four boilers, each of which was capable of 350 horsepower (260 kW); these boilers provided all of the building's steam. There was a coal bunker next to the boiler room. The refrigeration room contained an ice machine with a capacity of 25 tons, as well as a vacuum-cleaning system. An electric motor ventilated air from the basement; the apartments originally did not have a ventilation system.

The Belnord drew cold water from the New York City water supply system, which was then pumped up to the roof. There was a reserve tank on the roof with a capacity of 10,000 US gallons (38,000 L), as well as three other water towers. The building initially contained 14 hydraulic elevators, of which eight were for freight and six were for passengers. The Belnord had the same number of passenger and freight elevators after its condominium conversion. There were also emergency staircases with fire hoses on each story. In addition, there was a telephone switchboard made of Vermont marble, measuring 7.5 by 15 feet (2.3 by 4.6 m).

The modern-day condominium building contains service rooms, such as mechanical, plumbing, and electrical rooms, in its two basements, ground level, and roof. The Belnord is served by the city's gas supply system and power grid, although the building produces its own steam using boilers in the sub-basement. Although the apartments formerly used window-mounted air conditioners, some of the apartments have been connected to the building's central air system.

==== Amenities and common spaces ====
Originally, each of the building's lobbies was 24 feet (7.3 m) wide. The ground story was initially arranged as dentists' and physicians' offices; two of the ground-level offices were part of duplex apartments with living spaces on the second floor. The ground story contained 17 storefronts by 1921. Each tenant had a storage room in the basement. There were horse stables in the basement as well, beneath the courtyard. The roof contained private laundry rooms. There was a laundry room at each corner of the building; each laundry room had 36 washtubs, as well as a private dryer for each tenant.

After the 2010s renovation, the Belnord contained about 9,000 square feet (840 m^{2}) of amenities. These included dining areas and a private lounge for residents. The lounge contains several groups of seating, as well as a set of doors that can split the lounge into two spaces. The ground story contains mailboxes for each apartment, a small laundry room, and a playroom with an attached kitchen. There are also two bicycle storage rooms and a small fitness center. On the upper stories, the vestibules were clad with mosaic tiles. Many of the original design details were preserved in the 2010s renovation, including floor vestibules with mosaic tiles. Stern also installed black-and-white decorations within the public spaces, which were inspired by Dorothy Draper's original decorations for the Carlyle Hotel on the Upper East Side. These decorations included marble vestibules, white hallways, and black apartment doors.

==== Residences ====
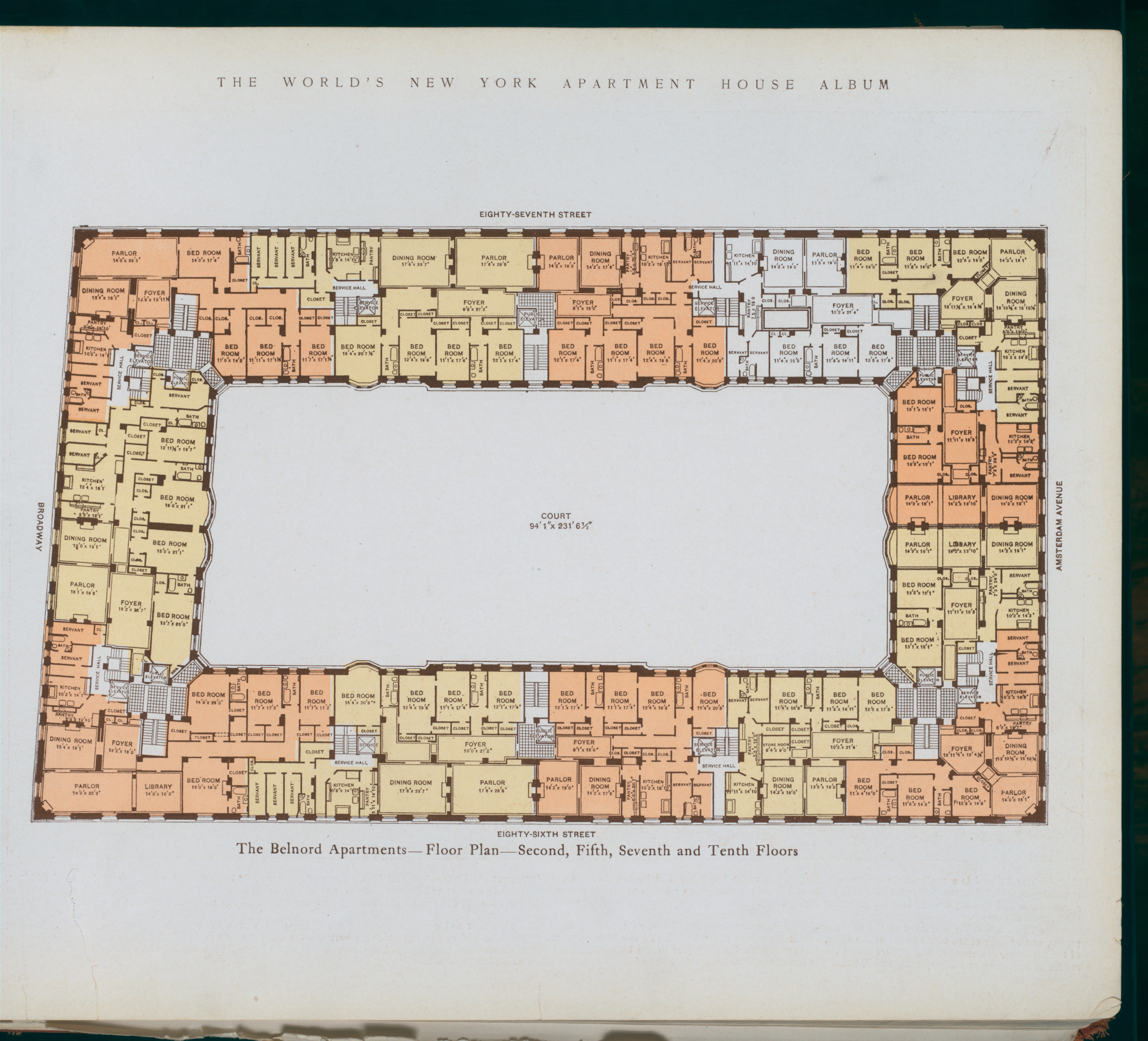
One of the original floor plans

The Belnord originally contained 175 or 176 rental apartments, (Note: Several sources place the number of original apartments at 175, while others cite the number as 176.) each of which contained up to 11, 12, or 14 rooms. Each floor above the first-floor mezzanine typically contained 16 apartments. The building was initially divided into six sections, each with two to four apartments per floor; each section was served by its own set of elevators. To minimize the amount of space that was occupied by corridors, the elevator lobbies on each floor connected directly with the apartments on that floor. Although many apartments contained bedrooms for servants, the top story contained additional servants' quarters, with hardwood floors, cement walls, and bathrooms. By the 1940s, the servants' rooms on the upper stories had been subdivided, and the Belnord contained 225 apartments. When the Belnord was converted to condominiums in the late 2010s, it was divided into 231 units. The first 95 condos, with two to five bedrooms each, were sold beginning in 2018.

Originally, servants' rooms, bedrooms, and family rooms were generally separated. Each apartment was 50 feet (15 m) deep, facing both the street and the courtyard. Many apartments had a library, dining room, and parlor. The bedrooms and servants' rooms typically faced the courtyard, which was wider than the neighboring section of 86th Street. Family rooms such as living rooms, parlors, dining rooms, and kitchens faced the street. In general, each apartment was accessed by a large foyer. The foyer led to a parlor and dining room that were connected to one another. A kitchen, butler's pantry, and servants' bedrooms were next to the dining room. Another corridor led perpendicularly from the foyer to the bedrooms. On average, each apartment had two to four bathrooms and two or three servants' bedrooms. Each apartment also had large closets.

The apartments were decorated in the Louis XVI style. They contained silk tapestries, painted wall panels, solid mahogany doors, and hardwood floors. The drawing rooms and dining rooms of each apartment contained fireplaces with carved mantels. All mantels were hand-carved in different designs and were imported; the decorations on the walls were also imported. The bedrooms had full-height mirrors mounted onto the doors of the closets, and every apartment had its own wall safe, refrigerator, and telephone system. The units were advertised as having technologically advanced equipment; for example, the refrigerators in the kitchen had built-in ice machines, and there were radiators beneath each window. Each of the kitchens also contained custom-designed cooking ranges, a garbage chute, and two laundry tubs.

The renovated condominiums are generally larger than the rental apartments that they replaced. Stern removed many of the partition walls between the living rooms, dining rooms, and kitchens, creating open plan living spaces that generally face the street. The bedrooms, which were arranged to face the courtyard, mostly retain their original layouts. The apartments contain a similar color palette to the public spaces. The kitchens have white lacquer or oak cabinets and gold counters; the guest bathrooms use black-and-white marble; and the master bathrooms contain white marble cladding. Multiple model apartments were created during the condo conversion, including an apartment by Rafael de Cárdenas with a contemporary design, as well as another unit by Anna Karlin with "a mix of vintage and custom-designed pieces".

== History ==
During the early 19th century, apartment developments in New York City were generally associated with the working class. By the late 19th century, apartments were also becoming desirable among the middle and upper classes. Between 1880 and 1885, more than 90 apartment buildings were developed in the city. The Belnord was one of several large luxury apartment buildings developed in New York City during the early 20th century. It was developed following the success of the Apthorp, another full-block apartment building with an interior courtyard, which had been built at 79th Street and Broadway in 1908.

=== Development and early years ===
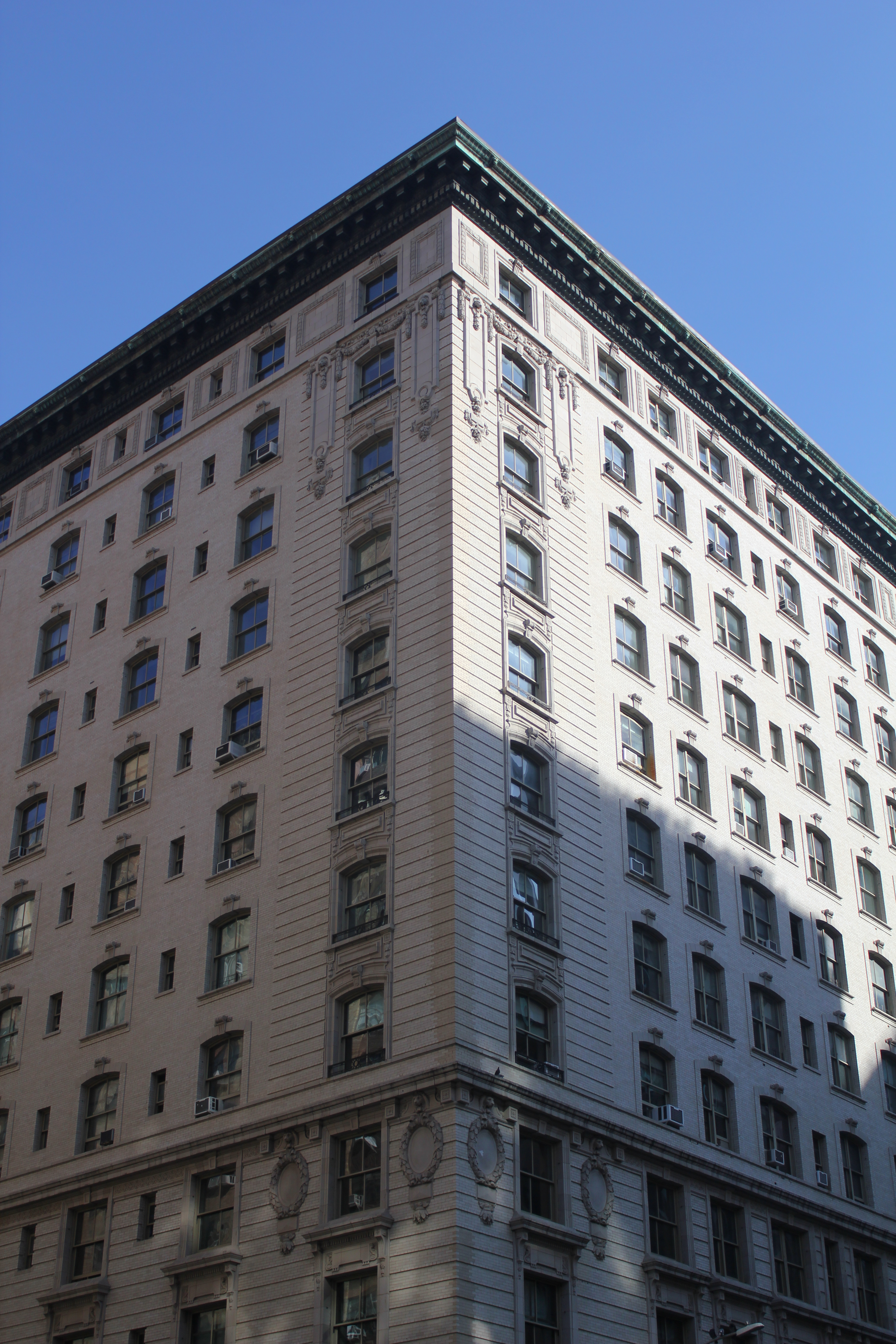
Viewed from the corner of 86th Street and Amsterdam Avenue

The Hoyt family had acquired the site of the Belnord in the late 19th century, but the site remained vacant for 20 years. The Belnord Realty Company syndicate bought the block bounded by Broadway, Amsterdam Avenue, and 86th and 87th Streets from the Broadway and Eighty-sixth Street Company, a holding company for the Hoyt family, in July 1908. The syndicate was composed of numerous businessmen, including Henry Reese Hoyt and Sherman Hoyt, whose family had owned the site previously. The purchasers immediately announced plans to construct a 12-story apartment building on the site, to be designed by Hiss and Weekes. The building was to measure 350 feet (110 m) long, 200 feet (61 m) wide, and 150 feet (46 m) tall; media sources described the Belnord as the world's largest apartment building at the time. The George A. Fuller Company received the general contract for the project, and William Bradley & Son was hired to manufacture the building's limestone. In addition, John P. Kane Co. was hired to supply brick for the building. That September, the Belnord gave a $3 million (equivalent to $107,000,000 in 2025) mortgage loan for the building to the Metropolitan Life Insurance Company. Excavation of the site began on September 18, 1908.

Hiss and Weekes submitted plans for the building in November 1908, at which point the building was to cost $1.8 million (equivalent to $64,000,000 in 2025). The next month, a commissioner from the city's Tenement House Department approved plans for several of the building's mechanical systems. To accommodate the service rooms, loading areas, and storage areas in the basement, the site was excavated to a depth of 12 to 20 feet (3.7 to 6.1 m). Excavation of the site included blasting large boulders out of the way, a process that took four months. Construction of the building's steel frame began on January 1, 1909. By March 1909, the steelwork on the western portion of the site was complete, while the eastern portion was still being excavated. The construction of the Belnord inspired the development of other nearby apartment buildings, particularly on vacant lots that had been owned by real estate speculators for several years.

The Belnord opened on October 1, 1909. W. H. Dolson & Co. was hired as the building's first rental agent and opened an office there in October 1909. The Belnord initially offered free electricity, refrigeration, and vacuum-cleaning services. It could be easily accessed from other parts of New York City through its proximity to the subway, the Ninth Avenue elevated line, and several streetcar routes. Because of its size, the Belnord employed a full-time staff of 100. By 1914, the Belnord's annual rents ranged from $2,100 to $6,500 (equivalent to $67,000 to $209,000 in 2025). Many of the Belnord's early tenants were European Jews who had immigrated to the U.S., as well as "unreconstructed Socialists and scores of psychoanalysts". According to a later New York Times article, the Belnord was the United States' largest apartment building for about 15 years and may have been the world's largest apartment building.

=== 1920s to early 1970s ===
Max N. Natanson bought the building from Sherman Hoyt, the president of the Belnord Realty Company, in December 1921. At the time, the Belnord was valued at $4.5 million ($81.2 million in 2025). Natanson immediately resold the building to Charles Newmark of the firm of Newmark and Jacobs. The Riverside Viaduct Realty Company took over the building in February 1922, although the Wood-Dolson Company remained as the building's rental agent. A group of investors, headed by Anderson & Hurd, agreed to buy the Belnord from Newmark in February 1923, at which point the building was valued at $6 million ($113 million in 2025) and earned over $1 million ($18.1 million in 2025) per year in rent. The New York Times reported at the time that it was the largest single residential sale in New York City. Edward J. Gould and Jack Stein acquired the building in November 1925 for about $6.5 million ($119 million in 2025). The Farmers' Loan and Trust Company, acting on behalf of Metropolitan Life, foreclosed on the building's $3 million mortgage in May 1926, and Gould and Stein resold the building to Chauncey B. Kingsley the same month. The National City Bank of New York leased some of the building's storefronts in 1928 and remodeled them into a bank branch.

The City Bank Farmers Trust Company, the successor to both National City Bank and Farmers' Trust, refinanced the building in 1930, combining the building's original $3 million mortgage with another loan of $400,000. By September 1935, City Bank Farmers Trust was foreclosing on the building's mortgage loan to satisfy a $3.459 million debt. The foreclosure proceedings were delayed to May 1936, when the bank took over the building after bidding $3.4 million ($78.9 million in 2025) at a foreclosure auction. The 225 West 86th Street Corporation, controlled by City Bank Farmers Trust, owned the building for the next nine years. The bank began negotiating to sell the Belnord to a group of investors in November 1945. At the time, the building had almost 1,000 residents, and nearly all of its 186 apartments were occupied. The syndicate, the Belnord Realty Corporation, finalized its purchase of the Belnord in December 1945. The new owners successfully petitioned a New York state judge to reduce the building's valuation of $3.2 million by 20 percent in 1946.

Disputes between the building's tenants and owners arose as early as 1954, when the owners converted the main entrance into a butcher's shop and fenced off the inner courtyard. The New York City Landmarks Preservation Commission (LPC) designated the Belnord as a New York City landmark in 1966, although the designation applied only to the outer facade, not to the inner facade along the courtyard. The Belnord was one of the first buildings on the Upper West Side to be designated as a New York City landmark. All of the Belnord's 290 apartments were placed under rent control during the late 20th century, since the building had been erected before World War II. After New York's rent-regulation laws were modified in 1971, the Belnord joined the state's Rent Stabilization Association; this allowed its owners to convert rent-controlled apartments to higher-paying rent-stabilized units after existing tenants had moved out.

=== Seril ownership ===
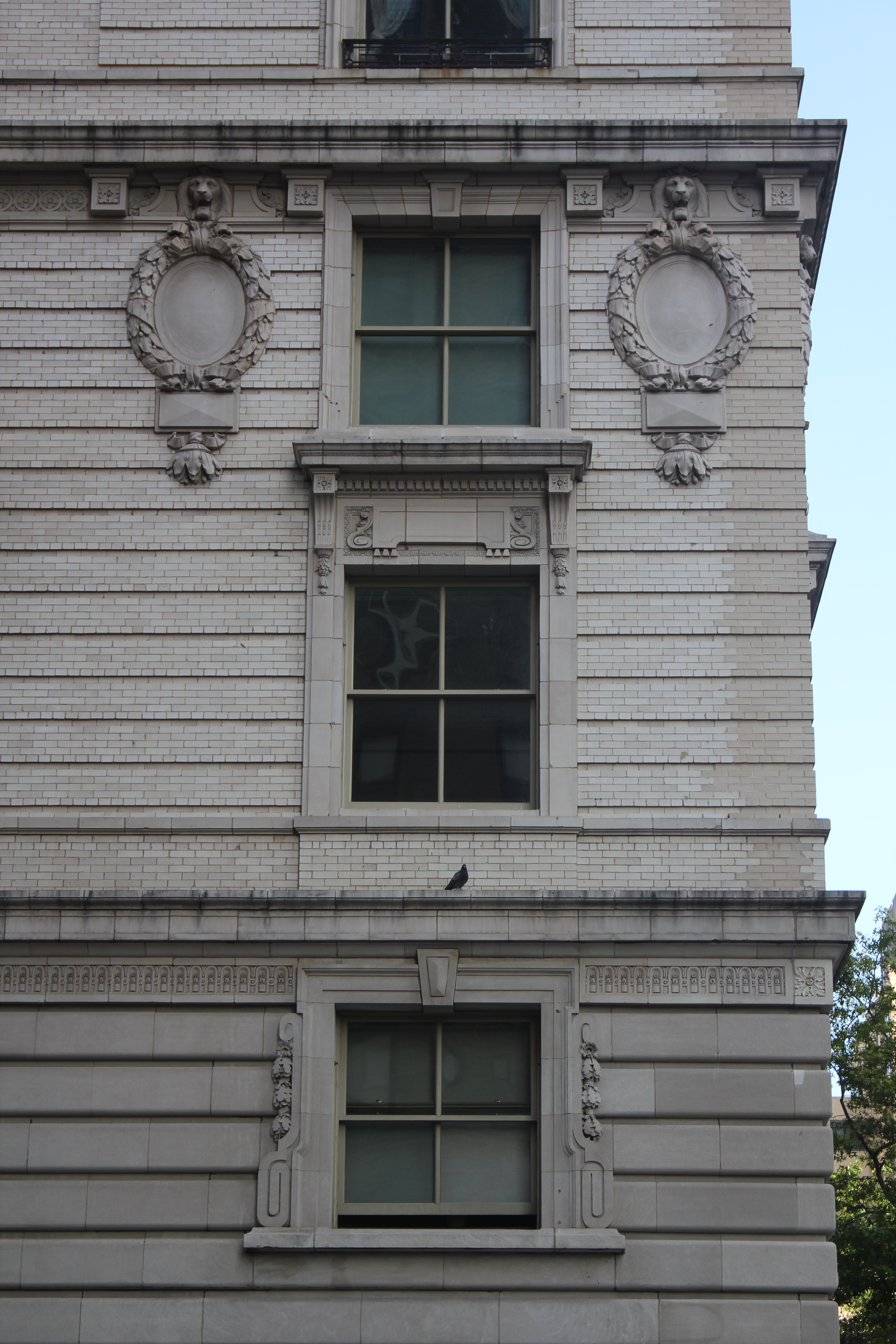
Third- through fifth-story windows at the corner of the facade

==== 1970s ====
Nathan Seril and his wife Lillian gained complete control of the Belnord in 1974, buying out their partners' stakes. The Serils began demanding that tenants pay overdue rent, claiming that some tenants were illegally subleasing or renovating their apartments, while tenants alleged that the building suffered from numerous structural issues such as a leaky roof, crumbling ceilings, burst pipes, broken elevators, and unreliable water service. Two-thirds of the apartments were still rent-controlled, and typical monthly rents for these units were about $60 ($390 in 2025) per room. This led the Serils' son-in-law to say: "If you keep the rents in the building lower than they are in the South Bronx, how do you stop the property from running down?"

Disputes over the building began to peak in the late 1970s. The Belnord was expelled from the Rent Stabilization Association in 1976 after Lillian Seril failed to pay membership dues, so the rent-stabilized apartments became rent-controlled in 1979, and their rents were decreased by 30 to 50 percent. Many of the rent-stabilized tenants objected to paying lower rents, saying that the building had fallen into disrepair. Several tenants recalled that they had to sneak refrigerators, kitchen tiles, and repairmen into the building in the middle of the night, because Seril would not allow them to replace their appliances. About 100 tenants began a rent strike in 1978, placing their rent payments into an escrow account. The building's tenant association raised $330,000 ($1.63 million in 2025) from rent strikers within two years. Some of this money was used to pay an administrator, whom Manhattan Housing Court judge Ralph Waldo Sparks appointed in early 1980. The New York Times said that the appointment of an administrator was "usually reserved for slum tenements in desperate throes". The tenants also hired an engineer in 1979, who estimated that the building needed $5 million ($22.2 million in 2025) in repairs.

==== 1980s and early 1990s ====
The Belnord was added to the National Register of Historic Places in 1980. Sparks unsuccessfully attempted to broker an agreement between the tenants and Seril, and he withdrew from the Belnord dispute completely that July. By late 1980, the New York City Department of Housing Preservation and Development (HPD) was hearing "eight or nine" disputes between Seril and the building's 225 tenants. City inspectors had cited the Belnord for 132 violations of city construction codes, and the building had accumulated $65,000 ($254,000 in 2025) in unpaid bills and back taxes. The building's roof, mechanical systems, and elevators needed major renovations; many of the apartments had leaks and collapsed ceilings; and the deck beneath the courtyard was in danger of collapsing. Seril claimed that residents of the penthouse apartments had planted roof gardens, which placed extra weight on the roof. In spite of the maintenance issues, many tenants remained in place, in part because of the extremely low rent; for example, a six-room apartment cost $460 per month ($1,800 in 2025). The HPD ruled in 1981 that Seril had harassed tenants and had failed to make necessary repairs.

Seril sued the rent-striking tenants in March 1983, claiming that they owed $7.5 million ($24.2 million in 2025); she sought at least $9 million in damages. Tenants claimed that they had been withholding rent to pay for repairs. Although Seril alleged that tenants had refused to let maintenance workers inspect the apartments, several tenants stated that Seril's contractors did poor-quality work and that Seril refused to allow residents to hire their own contractors. State judge Martin Evans ruled in July 1983 that the striking tenants had to pay back rent; the next January, Evans ended the rent strike and ordered the building's tenant association to pay Seril $1.2 million ($3.88 million in 2025). According to Evans, many tenants had not made payments to either the Belnord's tenant association or Seril. Arguments over the building's condition continued. Seril's lawyer claimed in 1984 that she had spent $70,000 on new elevators and $20,000 on additional changes, but residents said the building still suffered from other issues, including a huge crack on the facade. The HPD's commissioner refused to intervene, saying that he did not want a situation like the siege of Beirut, "where one or both parties are shooting at us".

Meanwhile, Seril continued to increase rents by up to 7.5 percent per year. A state judge ruled in March 1987 that rents for over 150 apartments had to be rolled back to 1980 rates, because the HPD's tenant-harassment ruling against Seril had never been repealed. The Belnord's tenants established a maintenance fund, the Belnord Landmark Conservancy. The co-chair of the conservancy, Thomas Vitullo-Martin, cited an engineer who estimated that the building needed $7 million ($19.8 million in 2025) in repairs. Seril sued to evict 50 tenants for nonpayment of rent; her lawyer claimed that the tenants were trying to drive Seril into bankruptcy. In 1991, a state judge ruled that Seril had to begin repairing the roof; these repairs were still not completed four years later. The next year, workers began repairing five canopies outside the building; after one of the canopies collapsed, Seril's architect requested that the LPC permit workers to uninstall the other canopies. Seril continued to dispute the 1987 rent rollbacks until she lost her appeal in 1993, upon which she decided to give residents rent credits, allowing them to live rent-free for up to three years. Dozens of residents continued to withhold rent through 1994, saying that Seril had failed to fix numerous major issues, such as cracked walls.

=== Property Markets Group and Extell ownership ===
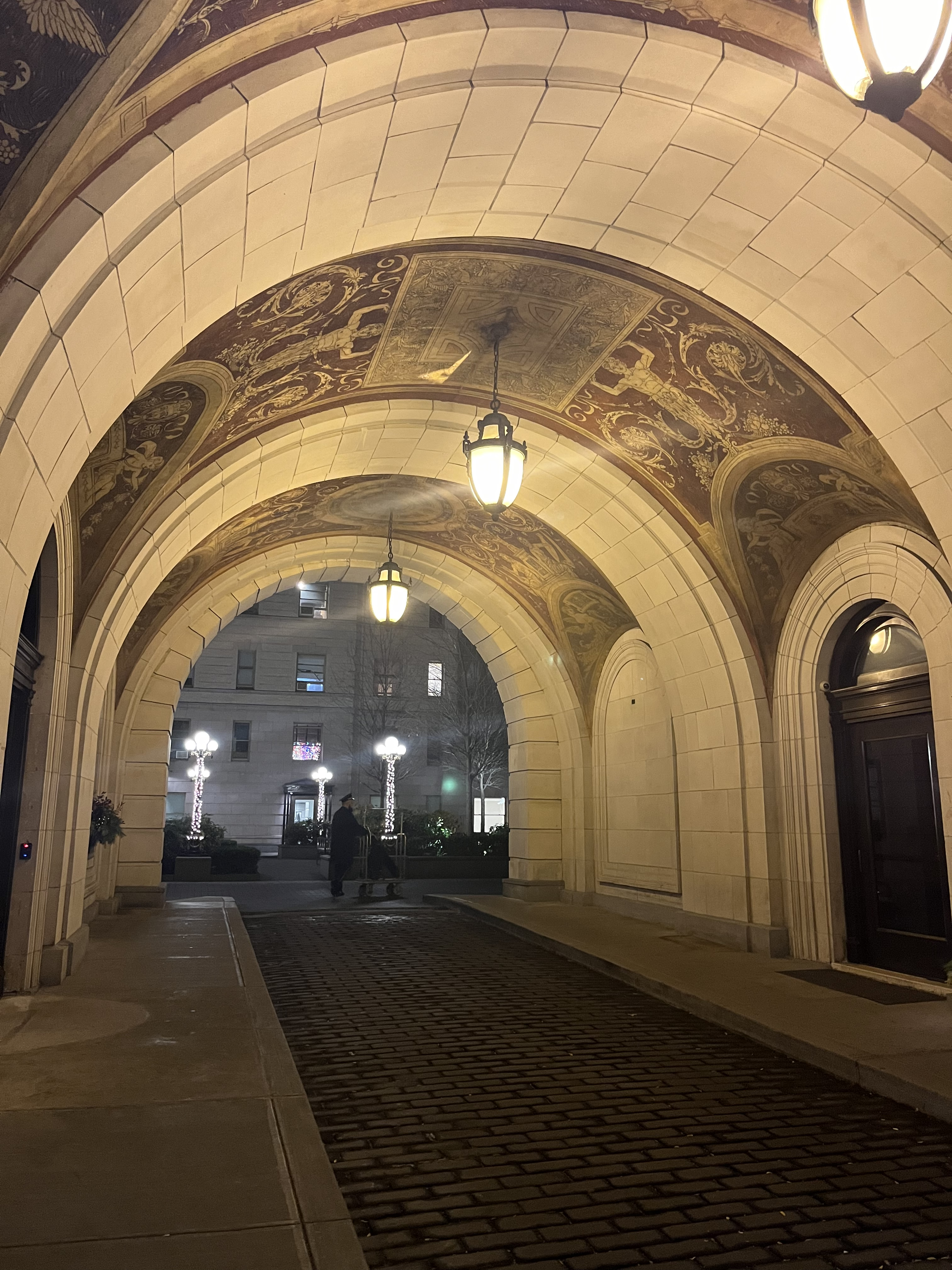
Entrance passageway

Ziel Feldman and Kevin Maloney of Property Markets Group (PMG), in conjunction with Gary Barnett, acquired the building in October 1994 for $15 million. This was equivalent to about $66,000 per apartment; had the building been maintained properly, real-estate experts said Seril could have charged market-rate rents and sold each apartment for two to three times as much. Barnett said three European families provided much of the funding for the acquisition; Curbed subsequently reported that Israeli diamond dealer Beny Steinmetz was one of the largest financial backers of PMG's purchase. The state government unfroze the rent after the new owners promised to spend $5 million on renovations; at the time, many tenants were paying as much rent as they had in 1979. To pay for the improvements, the owners raised tenants' rents by up to 60 percent between 1994 and 1995. Tenants also withdrew all of their lawsuits against Seril, who retained a rent-controlled apartment at the Belnord until her death in 2004. The new owners agreed to limit rent increases for 115 tenants who were part of the Belnord Landmark Conservancy, although it did not negotiate any such rent cap for the other tenants.

PMG leased one of the storefronts to clothing store Banana Republic, and the LPC allowed the owners to install a fiberglass canopy over the storefront. The building's owners hired David Kenneth Specter & Associates to design a renovation of the building, which included converting part of the basement into a 30,000-square-foot (2,800 m^{2}) store, restoring the facade and courtyard, and replacing 2,211 windows. Several tenants expressed concerns that the renovation would be disruptive and that the courtyard had recently been renovated. Barnett ultimately spent over $100 million to renovate the building, renting the apartments for up to $45,000 per month. Barnett purchased houses as far away as Florida and Nevada, giving the houses to rent-regulated tenants for free; other tenants stayed at the Belnord but relocated to a smaller apartment. CVS Pharmacy leased the Belnord's ground-level storefront in April 1998, and six existing tenants were relocated, but the opening of the CVS location was delayed by a year. The Belnord also contained the first headquarters of Barnett's company Intell Development (later Extell). By the late 1990s, the newly renovated apartments were being rented for up to $13,500 per month.

Feldman sold his stake in the building in 2000. The Wall Street Journal reported in 2001 that Barnett had resold 40 units in total, including 15 units where he had bought out or traded with existing tenants. Many of the Belnord's remaining rent-regulated residents were elderly, which made the building a naturally occurring retirement community. The high concentration of elderly residents led to disputes over matters such as whether benches or a playground should be installed in the courtyard. Barnett spent large sums of money to renovate the courtyard's fountain, which he called the "fountain of youth" because of the seeming longevity of the building's residents. The renovation involved disassembling the fountain and adding a guard booth and central lobby. After renovating the courtyard, he rented the basement to electronic store P. C. Richard & Son in 2003. Barnett also added a children's playroom that could be used as a meeting space, as well as a fitness center. Barnett leased 76 apartments to their respective tenants for 49 years in 2006; these residents agreed to annual rent increases of up to 5 percent, and they were restricted from bequeathing their apartments under certain conditions.

Barnett received a $375 million interest-only loan from UBS in late 2006, replacing a $182.6 million mortgage loan that had been placed on the building. The building still had 119 rent-controlled and 22 rent-stabilized apartments at the time of the loan. A judge ruled in 2009 that, because the building was receiving a J-51 tax abatement, Barnett was not allowed to deregulate any more apartments until 2015. At the time, market-rate tenants typically paid $14,266 per month, while rent-regulated tenants only paid $1,154 per month. As a result of the court ruling, Barnett had trouble making payments on his interest-only loan, which was sent to special servicing in 2011. The loan was removed from special servicing in early 2012, after Barnett had made all overdue payments. The New York Court of Appeals voided the lease agreements in 2013 after finding that Barnett had tried to bypass rent-regulation laws, and these apartments reverted to being rent-stabilized. The same year, the building's Banana Republic store relocated across Broadway.

=== Condominiums ===
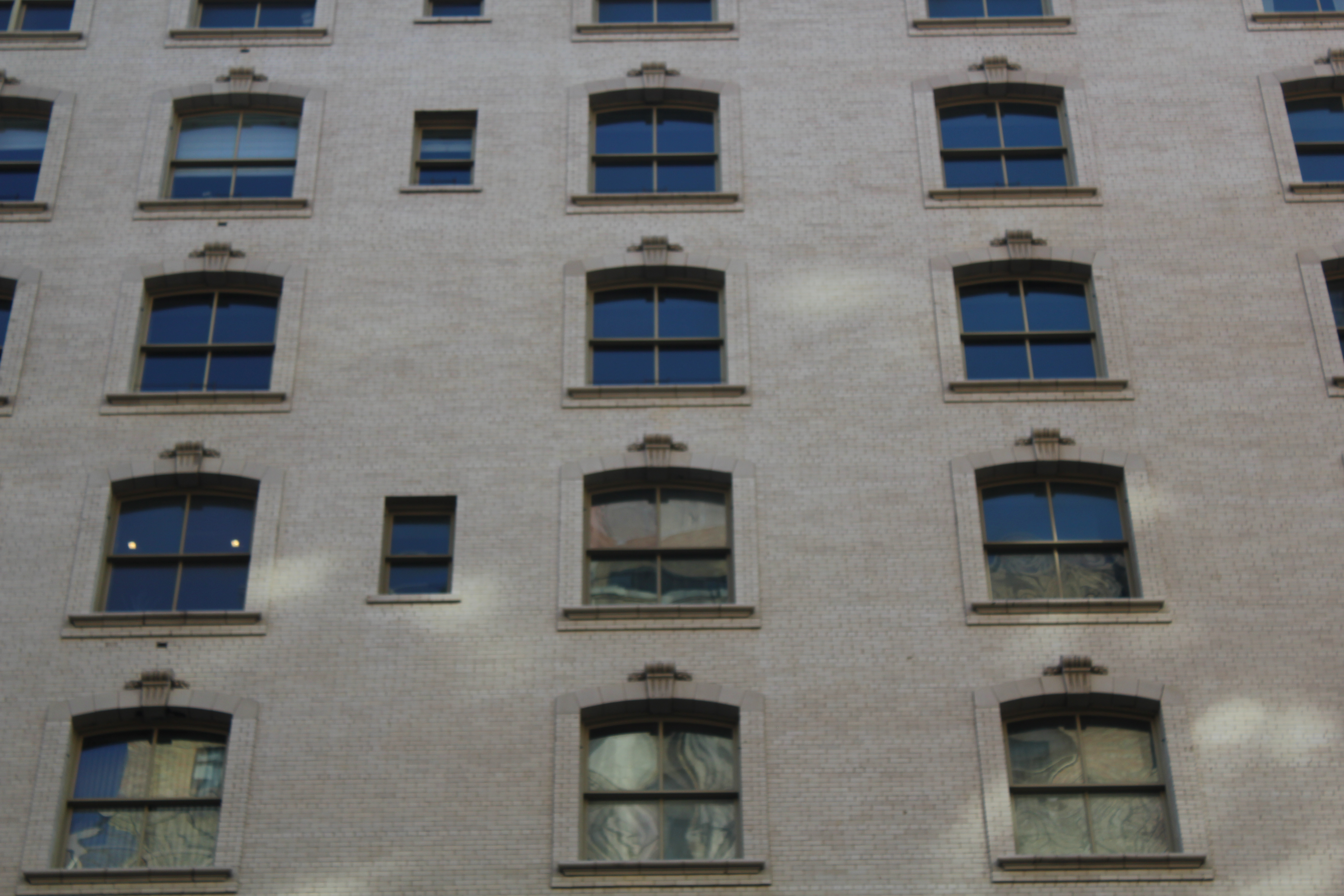
Windows on the brick facade of the upper stories

Barnett agreed to sell the residential portion of the building in late 2014 to his former partner Ziel Feldman. Feldman's company, the HFZ Capital Group, took over in March 2015 after paying $575 million; this equated to about $2.64 million per apartment. Extell retained ownership of the building's storefronts and refinanced them in July 2015 with a $100 million loan. HFZ planned to convert the apartments into condominiums and submitted a condominium offering plan to the New York Attorney General's office in April 2016. The offering plan indicated that the units would be sold for a total price of $1.35 billion, making it the second-most-expensive condominium development on the Upper West Side (after 15 Central Park West) and one of the most expensive in New York City. HFZ initially indicated that it would convert all the apartments at the same time, but HFZ officials later announced that they would first renovate 95 of the apartments.

HFZ hired architect Robert A. M. Stern in April 2017 to renovate these apartments, and the firm also hired Rafael de Cárdenas to design common amenity spaces within the building. Stern's modifications included adding new lobbies, redesigning the courtyard driveway, installing a central-air system, adding a gym and other amenities, and rearranging the apartments. The attorney general's office permitted HFZ to begin selling condominiums in August 2017. Westbrook Partners acquired a minority stake in the project in March 2018, paying $660 million. The partners obtained a $300 million loan from Wells Fargo that May. The first units were placed for sale in June 2018. The renovated units cost between $3.6 million and $11 million, although some existing residents paid a significantly discounted price for their apartments.

Westbrook had taken over the project by early 2021, at which point HFZ held a minority equity stake. At the time, HFZ was the subject of several lawsuits, and its debt was increasing. Media sources subsequently reported that the building had been financed in part by Steinmetz, although HFZ had denied any connection with Steinmetz as late as 2020. By late 2022, the condo's sponsors had sold 80 percent of the units. Much of the Belnord's retail space remained vacant, though Starbucks leased one of the storefronts as a coffee shop in early 2023. Extell was negotiating with a bank to move into the retail space by June 2024. The next month, Flagstar Bank moved to foreclose on a $100 million loan that had been placed on the retail space.

== Notable residents ==
Notable residents have included:

- Sophie Braslau, opera singer
- Bruce Davidson, photographer
- Lillian Genth, artist
- Art D'Lugoff, jazz impresario
- Alexander Lambert, piano teacher
- Walter Matthau, actor
- Marilyn Monroe, actress
- Zero Mostel, actor
- Ona Munson, actress
- Isaac Bashevis Singer, writer
- Richard Stengel, journalist
- Alexis Stewart, television host and radio personality
- Martha Stewart, businesswoman
- Lee Strasberg, acting teacher
- Percival Wilde, playwright

== Impact ==
The New York Times wrote in 2022 that, "From the get-go, the Belnord was a newsmaker—an edifice of excess, a home for hyperbole." When the Belnord opened, the Real Estate Record and Guide wrote: "It is delightful to be able to step from the library in a smoking jacket and drop a letter into the chute running down through the semi-private vestibules." The New-York Tribune wrote that the Belnord was one of several apartment houses "where the seeker after a distinctive home finds the rarest of city home combinations—a perfect apartment and the charm of a beautiful garden spot". Lucy Cleveland wrote for Domestic Engineering, "Superbly have they illustrated in stone, in the Belnord, the idea of a complete and secluded home within the aggregated loftiness of walls that spread to east, to west, to north, to south, and whose Mycenaean massiveness indeed proclaims Defendam [I am defended]!"

Paul Goldberger, writing about the Belnord and the nearby Apthorp and Astor Court in 1979, said: "All of the buildings share the liability of courtyard apartment houses, which is poor light in all too many of the units, but they also share the ability of all good courtyard buildings to create far more than conventional buildings could a sense of a private, secure world." Christopher Gray wrote in 1987 that the Belnord, along with the Ansonia and the Apthorp, "gave a cosmopolitan electricity to" the section of Broadway north of 59th Street. A reporter for The New York Times wrote in 1997 that the Belnord was among "the pantheon of luxurious residences on the Upper West Side". According to Robert A. M. Stern, the Belnord "adds class to the neighborhood—an immeasurable amount of class", which influenced the style in which he renovated the condos.

In the 2020s comedic murder mystery series Only Murders in the Building, the Belnord was used as a filming location for exterior shots of the fictional Arconia Building. Interior shots for the show were filmed on a soundstage.

== See also ==
- List of buildings and structures on Broadway in Manhattan
- List of New York City Designated Landmarks in Manhattan from 59th to 110th Streets
- National Register of Historic Places listings in Manhattan from 59th to 110th Streets
