= Gary Barnett (real estate developer) =

American businessman

- Born: Gershon Swiatycki; Manhattan, New York, U.S.
- Education: B.A., Queens College; M.S., Hunter College
- Occupations: President and founder of Extell Development Company
- Father: Chaim Swiatycki

Gary Barnett is an American businessman. He is the president and founder of Extell Development Company, a real estate development firm involved in residential, commercial and hospitality properties.

== Personal life ==
Barnett was born Gershon Swiatycki on the Lower East Side of Manhattan. His father, Chaim Swiatycki, was a rabbi and Talmudic scholar. He received his Bachelor of Arts degree in math from Queens College and received a Master of Economics degree from Hunter College. Barnett is an Observant Jew who lives primarily in Monsey, New York. He is known for avoiding computers and technology and relying on a Flip phone.

== Career ==
Barnett began his career as a diamond trader in Antwerp, Belgium, during the 1980s. He returned to the United States in the 1990s to diversify into real estate, purchasing shopping malls and office buildings in the Midwest.

In 1994, he joined Kevin P. Maloney's Property Markets Group as a principal and made his first New York City purchase, the Belnord apartment building. In 1998, he contracted workers to build what would become the W Times Square. In 2003, Barnett partnered with the Carlyle Group to build The Orion, a 60-story luxury tower on 42nd Street.

Barnett is a 2011 American Institute of Architects (AIA) Heritage Ball honoree. He also received the AIA New York Chapter Award in 2011. He was ranked #6 on The Commercial Observer's Power 100 list in 2011, #2 in 2012, and #1 in 2013.

In the early 2010's, Barnett obtained financing from Abu Dhabi's investment funds to build One57, a "Supertall" residential skyscraper on 57th Street (Manhattan). One57's success, coming just after the 2008 financial crisis, kickstarted the development of Manhattan's Billionaires' Row.

For his next project, Central Park Tower, Barnett relied on financing from the Israeli Bond Market, the EB-5 visa program and the Chinese-State owned Shanghai Municipal Investment Group. Completed in 2020 at a cost of $3 Billion, the 1550 foot Central Park Tower is the world's tallest purely residential skyscraper.

In 2025, Barnett began planning for a new supertall development on the Upper West Side of Manhattan, taking advantage of the unique zoning afforded to the former ABC Studios building.

== Projects ==
- The Belnord, a landmark apartment building purchased for $18 million in 1994.
- W Times Square, 1998.
- Parking space site of the New York Times Building, 2001; Extell owned the space that Bruce Ratner was seeking to purchase for the office tower. Following lengthy litigation, Barnett was forced to sell the space to New York state via eminent-domain.
- The Orion, 2004; 58 story building in Hell's Kitchen, Manhattan, with financing from the Carlyle Group
- International Gem Tower, 2011
- One57, 2013; a 75-story (marketed at 90), 1,005 foot high residential building which will be New York's tallest residential buildings as well as one of the top ten tallest buildings of New York City. A 10,923-square-foot penthouse in the unfinished building was reported to have sold for $90 million in 2012—the most ever reported paid for a New York apartment at the time. The building received international attention in October 2012 when Hurricane Sandy flipped a 150-foot long crane steel boom over its cab and then dangled unsecured near the top of the building forcing the evacuation of several blocks of Midtown Manhattan.
- Central Park Tower, the World's tallest residential building with almost $4 billion in condo sales.
- The Carlton House, 2013; formerly the Helmsley Carlton House hotel. Located at 21 East 61st Street, the building was converted to 68 cooperative residences in 2013 by Beyer Blinder Belle Architects & Planners LLP, with interiors by Katherine Newman Design. In January 2013, it was announced that Thor Equities had purchased the block-long retail space for $277 million, among the highest total prices ever paid for a retail property on the street.
- Invested $150,000 into SwordPen Publishers (a small-press publisher of children's stories) for a 25% stake in the company.
