= Nippon Club (Manhattan) =

Private social club in New York City

Coordinates: 40.76508°N 73.97866°W

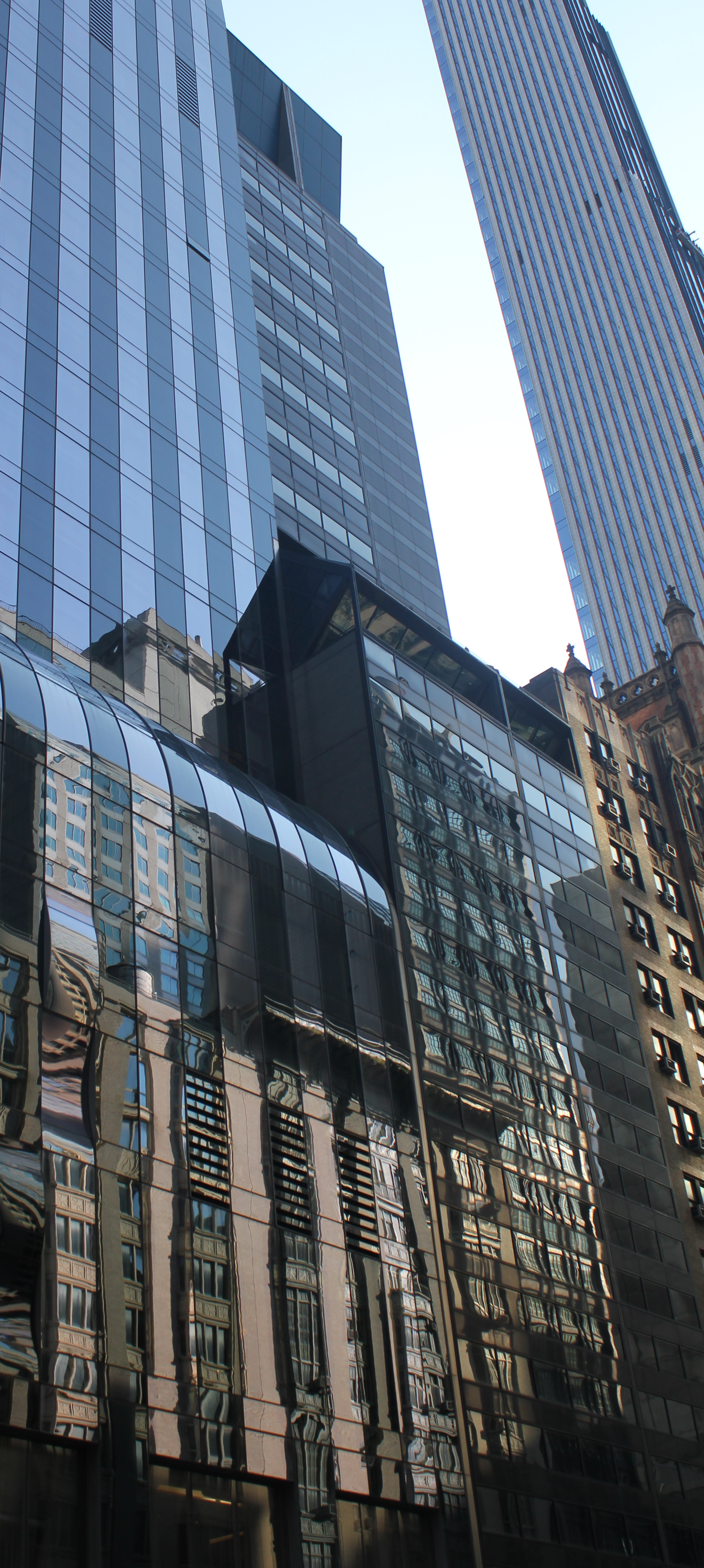
The Nippon Club is visible in the center.

The Nippon Club of New York City is a private social club on 57th Street in Midtown Manhattan, New York City, founded in 1905 by Jōkichi Takamine for Japanese Americans and Japanese nationals. The only Japanese private social club in the United States, the Nippon Club's dual purpose is to help enhance the unity of the Japanese community in New York City and to help develop evolving relationships with the American people. Over the course of its first century, the Nippon Club has fostered ongoing business and cultural relationships through various events, workshops, cultural classes and athletic events.

By holding various athletic events and cultural activities, as well as by providing the facilities where these events can occur, The Nippon Club has cemented itself as one of New York City's oldest cultural institutions. Membership has grown to about 3,000 members, including 800 women who are members of the allied Fujin-Bu Club; several hundred of these members are Americans.

The club has legal status under 501(c)(7) Social and Recreation Clubs; in 2025 it claimed total revenue of $6,824,557 and total assets of $15,236,708.

== History ==
The Nippon Club initially occupied a townhouse at 334 Riverside Drive, located between West 105th and 106th Streets on the Upper West Side of Manhattan.

The best early detailed description of the Nippon Club, its structure and membership appeared in January 1908 when the club was located at 44 West 85th Street in New York City's Upper West Side. In the book "Japan in New York" we are given: Large photos of the front of the club, the Drawing Room and the Japan Room. The basic listing for the club states (p. 20): "The Nippon Club was organized in March, 1905, by the leading Japanese residents of the city and is now presided over by Dr. J. Takamine, which Mr. Rinichi Uchida is looking after the club management." Pages 24–38 are entirely about The Nippon Club. "Organized March 15th, 1905. 44 W. 85th St., New York City. Officers for 1907–1908. Jokichi Takamine, president. Kikusaburo Fukui, Treasurer. Trustees (21 men). Standing committees for 1907–1908: Admission Committee(6). House Committee (7), Library Committee (5). Committee on Game (5 men).

Constitution of The Nippon Club (15 articles, incl. No. 2. "The object of the Club shall be to promote the social enjoyment of its members and to provide them with mental and physical recreation." No. 11. "The members of the Japanese associations in New York, respectively known as the Hinode Club and the Kyodo-Kwai, shall be entitled to membership in this Club without the formality of election and without admission fees, if they desire to join it"). Signed in the City of New York on March 15, 1905. Names of the 19 signers (incl. Jokichi Takamine) and their affiliations are given. By-Laws of the Nippon Club (14 articles, incl. Membership, Admission to membership). Honorary members (13 men, mostly Japanese living in Japan or other countries, also General Stewart L. Woodford, New York). Resident members (186 total, most having Japanese surnames, with the business address of each; R.V. Briesen and Chas. Loechner do not have Japanese surnames. "Takamine, Jokichi, 45 Hamilton Terrace" is listed among the resident members. Addresses outside of New York City include Tokyo, Japan; London, England; Cambridge, Massachusetts; and San Francisco, California.

On May 10, 1910, a prominent visiting Japanese statesmen Prince Tokugawa Iesato (aka Prince Iyesato Tokugawa) was honored with a farewell banquet at the Nippon Club – A dozen of his countrymen gave him a dinner party at the Nippon Club, prior to him sailing on the following morning back to Japan. The 1910 newspaper illustration to the right gives further details of his goodwill visit. The prince declared that he had enjoyed his visit immensely. His American friends were mighty kind to him, he said, and he added that the stay was pleasure only; no business significance at all. Prince Tokagawa took a ride through Central park this morning, had lunch with Melville E. Stone and others at the Lawyer's Club, and then went to the New York Hippodrome in the afternoon. Notes: Melville Elijah Stone (August 22, 1848 – February 15, 1929) was an American newspaper publisher, the founder of the Chicago Daily News, and was the general manager of the reorganized Associated Press. The New York Hippodrome was a theater in New York City from 1905 to 1939, located on Sixth Avenue between West 43rd and West 44th Streets in the Theater District of Midtown Manhattan. It was called the world's largest theatre by its builders and had a seating capacity of 5,300.

In 1912, the club relocated to a purpose-built new building which had been designed for the organization by architect John Vredenburgh Van Pelt. The Nippon Club remained at 161 West 93rd Street until December, 1941.

After the Japanese attack on Pearl Harbor, the building was seized by the U.S. federal government. In 1944, the Federal Office of the Alien Property Custodian sold the building to the Manhattan chapter of the Elks for $75,000. In 1956, the Nippon Club relocated to One Riverside Drive at 72nd Street near Riverside Park. When Emperor Showa visited the city in 1975, the Nippon Club joined with the Japanese Chamber of Commerce of New York and the Japanese American Association of New York in hosting a reception for the Imperial visitors at the Waldorf-Astoria Hotel.

The organization moved into its current home in 1991. The 21-story Nippon Club Tower, which was erected by the club at 145 West 57th Street, between Seventh and Sixth Avenues in Midtown Manhattan, between the One57 condominium to the west and the Calvary Baptist Church to the east. The club facilities encompasses a restaurant and tea room, banquet facilities, a ballroom, classrooms, and an exhibition gallery; however, unlike many similar clubs in Manhattan, overnight hotel accommodations were not included. The modern structure, designed by Norboru Uenishi, is faced with glass and granite. The facade is meant to be an abstract rendering of the Manhattan street grid (including the anomalies, such as Broadway).

== See also ==
- List of American gentlemen's clubs
- Japanese in New York City
