= One57 =

Residential skyscraper in Manhattan, New York

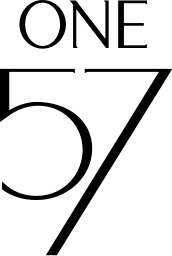

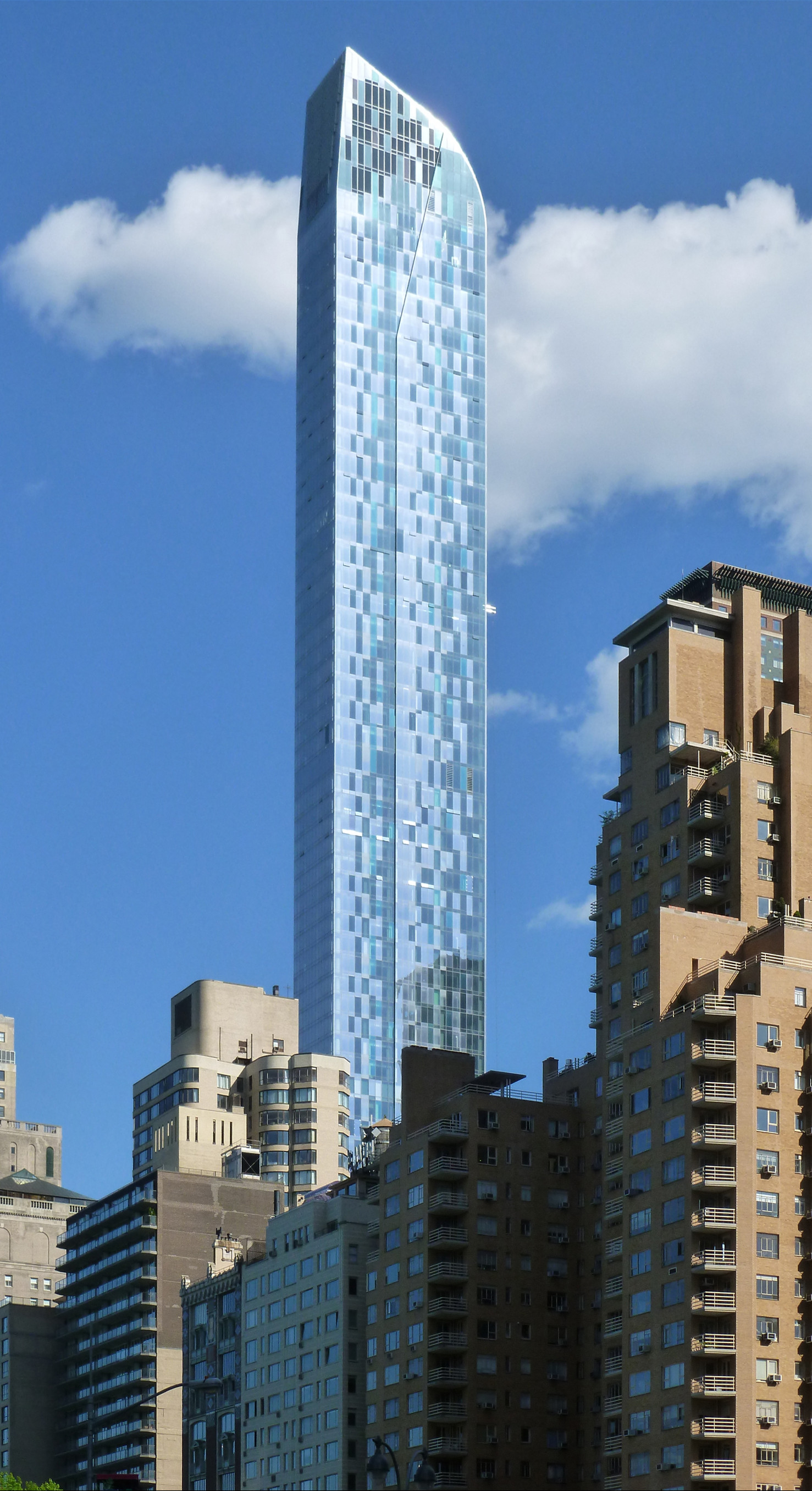
- One57 in May 2014

General information
- Status: Completed
- Type: Residential condominiums and hotel
- Architectural style: Modern
- Location: 157 West 57th Street; Manhattan, New York, U.S.
- Coordinates: 40°45′56″N 73°58′45″W
- Construction started: April 17, 2009
- Completed: August 13, 2014
- Cost: US$1.5 billion

Height
- Roof: 1,004 ft (306 m)
- Top floor: 902 ft (275 m)

Technical details
- Floor count: 73 (+2 below ground floors)
- Floor area: 853,567 sq ft (79,300 m^{2})

Design and construction
- Architects: Christian de Portzamparc; SLCE Architects (architect of record)
- Developer: Extell Development Company
- Structural engineer: WSP Group
- Main contractor: Lendlease

Website
- one57.com

One57, formerly known as Carnegie 57, is a 75-story, 1,005 ft (306 m) supertall skyscraper at 157 West 57th Street between Sixth and Seventh Avenues in the Midtown neighborhood of Manhattan, New York City. The building has 92 condominium units above a 210-room Park Hyatt Hotel that serves as the flagship Hyatt property. The tower was developed by Extell Development Company and designed by Christian de Portzamparc. It is the first ultra-luxury condominium tower along a stretch of 57th Street called Billionaires' Row.

One57 contains a facade made of panels in various shades of blue. The building has a curved roof and, on the side facing 57th Street, contains several setbacks that resemble waterfalls. One57's structural features include concrete floor slabs and two basement levels. The residential interiors contain furniture and materials by Thomas Juul-Hansen. On completion, the tower's design, particularly its facade and shape, was criticized.

Extell CEO Gary Barnett started acquiring One57's site in 1998, although building plans were not filed until 2009. Construction started in 2010, and work reached the top floor by mid-2012. Toward the end of construction, there were two major incidents: a collapsed construction crane requiring the evacuation of nearby buildings, as well as a fire. Upon completion in 2014, it was the tallest residential building in the city for a few months until the completion of 432 Park Avenue. The building set the records for the city's most and second-most expensive residences, selling respectively for $100.5 million and $91.5 million. However, sale prices started dropping in the late 2010s due to a general decline in the city's luxury condominium market.

== Site ==
One57 is in the Midtown neighborhood of Manhattan, New York City, just south of Central Park and between Sixth Avenue to the east and Seventh Avenue to the west. The building contains frontage along 57th Street to the south and 58th Street to the north. The irregular site covers 23,808 ft^{2} (2,211.8 m^{2}), with the 57th and 58th Streets sides being slightly offset. The 57th Street frontage is 106 ft (32 m) wide, while the lot has a depth of 200.83 ft (61.21 m) between the two streets. The building is along 6½ Avenue, a pedestrian walkway running parallel to Sixth and Seventh Avenues. It is aligned roughly with the center axis of Central Park.

One57 is on the same city block as Alwyn Court, The Briarcliffe, and 165 West 57th Street to the west, as well as the Nippon Club, Calvary Baptist Church, 111 West 57th Street, and The Quin to the east. One57 is also near Carnegie Hall and Carnegie Hall Tower to the southwest, the Russian Tea Room and Metropolitan Tower to the south, 130 West 57th Street and 140 West 57th Street to the southeast, and the JW Marriott Essex House and Hampshire House to the north. One57 is one of several major developments around 57th Street and Central Park, collectively known as Billionaires' Row. Other buildings along Billionaires' Row include 432 Park Avenue four blocks southeast, 220 Central Park South one block northwest, Central Park Tower one block west, and the nearby 111 West 57th Street.

== Architecture ==
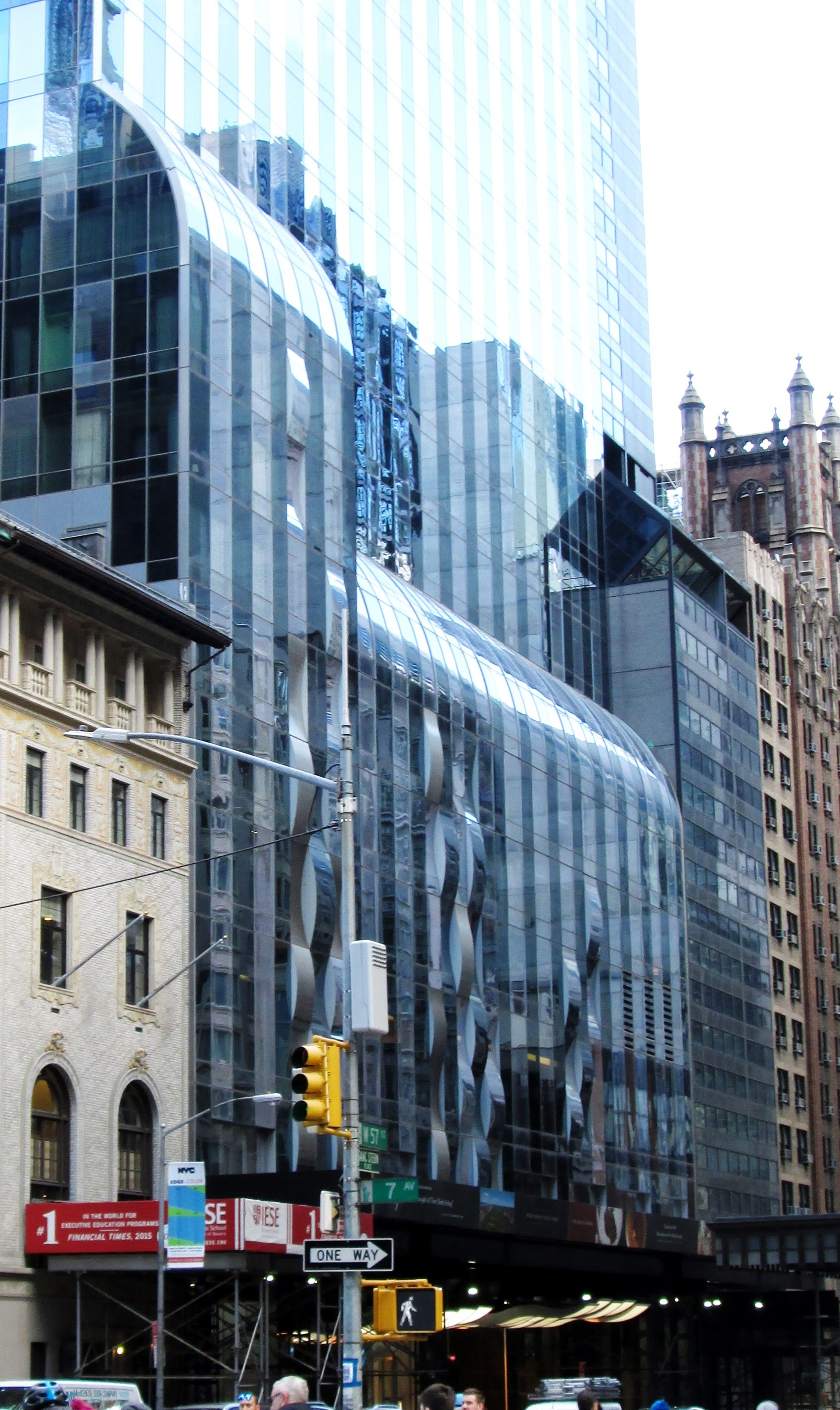
The base of One57 as seen from Seventh Avenue, with 165 West 57th Street visible at far left

One57 was developed by Extell Development Company, which in turn was led by Gary Barnett. The building was designed by architect Christian de Portzamparc, while Goldstein, Hill & West Architects worked on the design details. The building has a roof height of 1,004 ft (306 m) and its top floor at 902 ft (275 m). The certificate of occupancy issued by the New York City Department of Buildings lists the building as having 73 stories above ground level, with a height of 953 ft (290 m). The top story is numbered as floor 90.

=== Form and facade ===
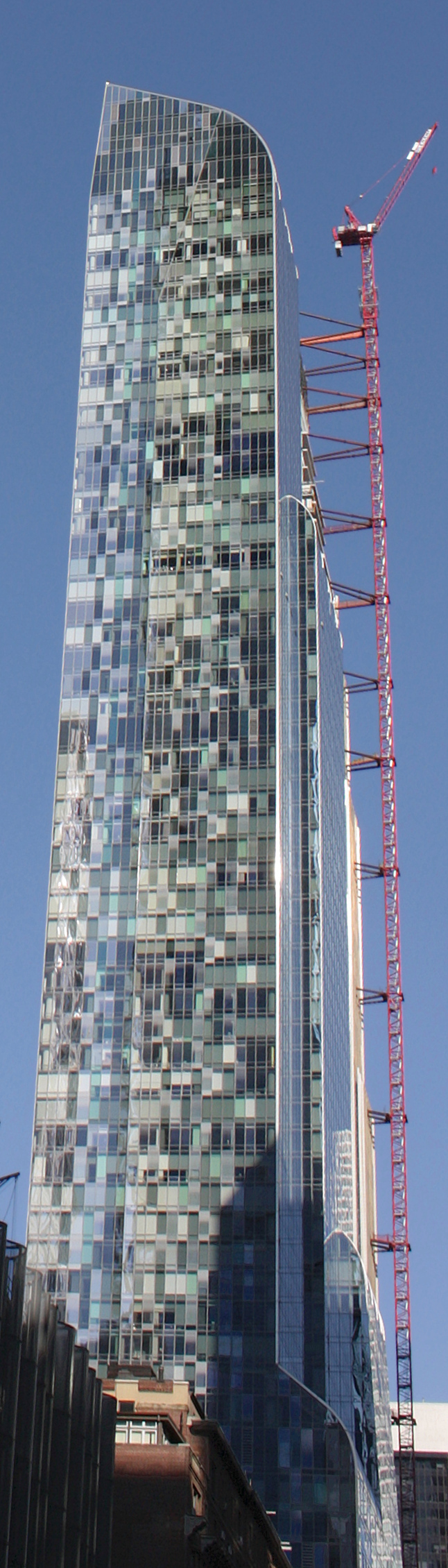
Southern facade with setbacks resembling a cascading waterfall, and western facade with multihued windows reminiscent of Klimt's works, cf. The Kiss

At ground level, One57 has an L-shaped floor plan extending both north to 58th Street and east along 57th Street. The building's massing, or shape, consists of varying curved and linear shapes. There are curved setbacks on 57th Street. The base of the building has undulating vertical glass strips around and above the entrances, which are also meant to symbolize a waterfall. The tower has rippled canopies and numerous setbacks on the 57th Street side. By contrast, the facade along 58th Street, facing Central Park, has a flatter profile without setbacks. A separate residential entrance also exists on the north facade at 58th Street.

The facade uses various pieces of dark and light blue glass, mixed with pewter- and silver-colored glass. These glass panes were arranged to create vertical stripes and were intended to absorb sunlight in various ways and maximize views. De Portzamparc likened the glass patterning on the northern and southern facades to the work of Austrian painter Gustav Klimt, citing the artist's work as having inspired the design. According to facade contractor Permasteelisa, the facade is made of 8,200 pieces in over 2,200 distinct shapes, covering 509,100 ft^{2} (47,300 m^{2}). A slightly different figure of 8,400 figures is cited by television network PBS. Among the shapes that are used in the facade are curved panels, at the setbacks; curved corner panels, at the extreme ends of the setbacks; "peel-outs", consisting of adjacent curved and flat panels; and the undulating "teardrop" panels around the entrances. Most shapes are used infrequently, with the most common shape being used about 300 times.

The pinnacle was designed by Goldstein, Hill & West. The curved roof of the building conceals a cooling tower and tapers in width to 60 feet (18 m). A window cleaning rig, measuring 30 ft (9.1 m) long and weighing 20 short tons (18 long tons; 18 t), was constructed for the building. The window cleaning deck hangs from a retractable crane arm that is installed on the roof.

=== Structural features ===
One57's structural features include concrete shear walls and columns with a strength of over 12,000 psi (83,000 kPa). This was meant to accommodate the interior uses, which include both a hotel on the lower floors and residential condominiums on the upper floors. The 12,000 psi strength concrete is used from the ground level to floor 26. The residential units are designed with a minimum ceiling height of 10.58 ft (3.22 m) or 10.83 ft (3.30 m) and a maximum height of 12.875 ft (3.924 m). Structurally, the superstructure is made of concrete flat plates, with floor slabs between 10 and 12 in (250 and 300 mm) thick and columns up to 30.5 ft (9.3 m) apart at their centers. The building also contains two subterranean stories, as well as a foundation composed of spread footings on the Manhattan bedrock.

To stiffen the building, shear walls are placed around the utility core containing the elevators and stairs, and wing shear walls are also installed. In addition, there are three mechanical levels spread out across the building, surrounded by one-story concrete walls, which in turn are designed to resist lateral forces. Where the setbacks on the facade are present, there are girders to transfer the loads between columns. An additional set of girders to transfer loads is installed above the residential amenity area on floor 20. The top of the building is stabilized by four liquid tuned mass dampers. The dampers are meant to provide stability against high winds or earthquakes.

=== Interior ===
The interiors of One57 were made of material from around the world. Roy Kim, the senior vice president of design at Extell, traveled to Carrara in Italy to approve every piece of white marble used for the apartments' bathrooms, and he also traveled to China, Turkey, and South Korea to obtain materials. Some of the stone came from China; at one point, Kim reportedly asked one Chinese stone supplier to lay out all the stone on the ground of a warehouse so he could examine whether the stone could be used in One57. The marble collectively cost several million dollars; a single slab costing $130,000 was enough to create two benches and two bathtubs. The wooden furniture was from the English county of Wiltshire, where a company was contracted to hand-make 3,500 wooden cabinet doors as well as 135 kitchens in 18 layouts.

The building is accessed via a lobby with lacquered woods. The lobby contains 3,200 lb (1,500 kg) of steel panels, which collectively cost $800,000; they had to be carried into the building through a narrow gap without being damaged.

==== Hotel ====
The lowest section of One57 contains the Park Hyatt New York, a 210-room hotel that serves as the flagship Hyatt property. The hotel occupies the lowest 18 physical stories of the tower, but publications cite the hotel as having 25 numbered floors. Yabu Pushelberg designed the hotel's interiors. The design includes 350 contemporary artworks spread across the hotel, as well as furnishings and fabrics, many of which were designed specifically for the Park Hyatt.

There are 12 rooms each on the fourth and fifth stories, 16 each on the sixth through eleventh stories, 14 each on the twelfth through sixteenth stories, and 10 each on the seventeenth and eighteenth stories. When the Park Hyatt opened in 2014, the rooms were listed for at least $855 per night. The suites cover at least 475 ft^{2} (44.1 m^{2}) and have sitting areas with glass partitions. The hotel's "deluxe" suites contain at least 530 ft^{2} (49 m^{2}) of space. When the hotel opened, it provided 24/7 room service, which guests could request through iPads.

The Hyatt has a ballroom, spa, swimming pool, fitness room, and conference rooms. The ballroom and meeting rooms are on the second story. The hotel's pool, on the 20th story (labeled as floor 25), contains underwater speakers that play classical music from Carnegie Hall. The hotel's Spa Nalai, covering 13,000 ft^{2} (1,200 m^{2}) on the same floor, contains several treatment suites, some of which have balconies. The spa's name was derived from the word for "serenity" in the Munsee language, originally spoken by the Lenape Native American population of Manhattan. The hotel also originally included an American grill called the Back Room, which was led by chef Sebastien Archambault when it opened in August 2014. Also included is a bar called The Living Room. The Onyx Room, the hotel's event space, has backlit slabs of white onyx on the walls.

==== Condominiums ====
Above the hotel are 92 condominium units, of which 52 face Central Park directly. The residences were designed by Thomas Juul-Hansen. The condominiums are served by a bank of three elevators that travel 20 mph (32 km/h) and can run between the ground floor and the top story in 40 seconds. Extell had deemed the residential floor plans to be so crucial that the floor plans were created before de Portzamparc was officially hired as architect and before the exterior was designed. The apartment corridors have silk coverings on their walls, which contain asymmetrical doorways to each unit. The apartments were designed with relatively few bedrooms so the spaces could remain large. There are mechanical rooms on the physical 19th, 47th, and 73rd stories. The resident manager has their own two-bedroom apartment on the southwest corner of floor 34.

There are slightly different floor plans throughout the building. Floor numbers 22–23 have five units each, plus a duplex split between the two stories, while floors 24–30 have six units each. Floor numbers 31–41 each have three full units, in addition to another duplex split between floors 31 and 32. There are two apartments each on the 42nd through 44th stories and three apartments each on floors 45 and 46. Floors 48–57 (with the exception of floor 54) each have two apartments, while floors 60–70 each have one unit occupying an entire floor. Floors 58–59 and 71–72 each have a single duplex unit. The penthouse on the two top floors contains six bedrooms and six bathrooms and covers 10,923 ft^{2} (1,014.8 m^{2}).

Typical of the full-story units is the apartment on the 62nd story (labeled as floor 82), designed with a 56 ft-wide (17 m) salon overlooking Central Park, as well as a breakfast room, kitchen, private foyer, reception gallery, and 12 ft (3.7 m) ceilings. Two of the units have outdoor terraces and are branded as the "spring garden" and the "winter garden" residences. The spring garden apartment is on floor numbers 41–42 and has five bedrooms and a 43-foot-long (13 m) living room, in addition to an eastward-facing solarium. The winter garden apartment on floor numbers 75–76 is named for its 2,500-square-foot (230 m^{2}) glass atrium, which resembles a winter garden.

The building's original condominium owners were given a choice of materials for the interior finishes: for example, they could choose between rosewood or white oak for the floors. The apartments were furnished with Italian marble, wooden flooring, specialized lighting and hardware, and kitchen appliances made by Smallbone of Devizes. Some of the kitchen appliances, such as dishwashers and refrigerators, were built into the apartments. A typical apartment, such as the three-bedroom unit on floor 58, was decorated with a toilet room with white-onyx floors; and baths with different types of marbles. The bathrooms have bidets and toilets manufactured by Duravit, as well as in-room televisions. Some units have two juxtaposed toilet rooms within their master bedrooms, and several units have private swimming pools. Some residents further customized their units; for example, one condominium unit on floor 67 was redecorated with marble-slab floors, white-gold leaf walls, a white-oak paneled living room, and a vaulted dining-room ceiling. Another unit, 61B, was decorated with $2.5 million of furnishings designed by Jeffrey Beers International.

==== Amenities ====
One57 was constructed with several amenities for residents. Entry to the building is overseen by a 24-hour concierge and doorman service. An amenities floor, occupying 20,000 ft^{2} (1,900 m^{2}), is included above the hotel. The residents' amenities floor is on the 21st story, directly above the hotel amenities on the 20th story. The building also has resident parking, a library, a kitchen, an arts-and-crafts space, a fitness room, a yoga room, and a pet washroom. There are also rooms for screening and performance, with leather seats for 24 people. Also included is a triple-height swimming pool and a Jacuzzi. The swimming pool room has a ceiling 23 ft (7.0 m) high, and the pool itself measures 65 ft (20 m) long and overlooks Central Park. A New York Times reporter, writing on the amenities in 2018, wrote that the building's "lifestyle attaché" Sascha Torres had also created events such as a wine-tasting, jazz concert, and Halloween trick-or-treating for the residents. Residents could also use the amenity spaces at the Hyatt hotel a la carte.

Initially, the developer provided 17 storage bins, each 7 ft (2.1 m) high, as a resident amenity. The bins were marketed for up to $200,000 in 2011, which at the time was a higher price per square foot than most Manhattan apartments and, according to The Wall Street Journal, more than a single-family home in Topeka, Kansas. The least expensive bins cost $110,000 and contained 30 ft^{2} (2.8 m^{2}). By 2014, Extell had filed for an amendment with the Attorney General of New York to include 21 storage bins. A larger bin measuring 54 ft^{2} (5.0 m^{2}) had an asking price of $216,000, or about $4,000/ft^{2} ($43,000/m^{2}), a square-foot price comparable to a condominium unit at the Puck Building in Lower Manhattan.

== History ==
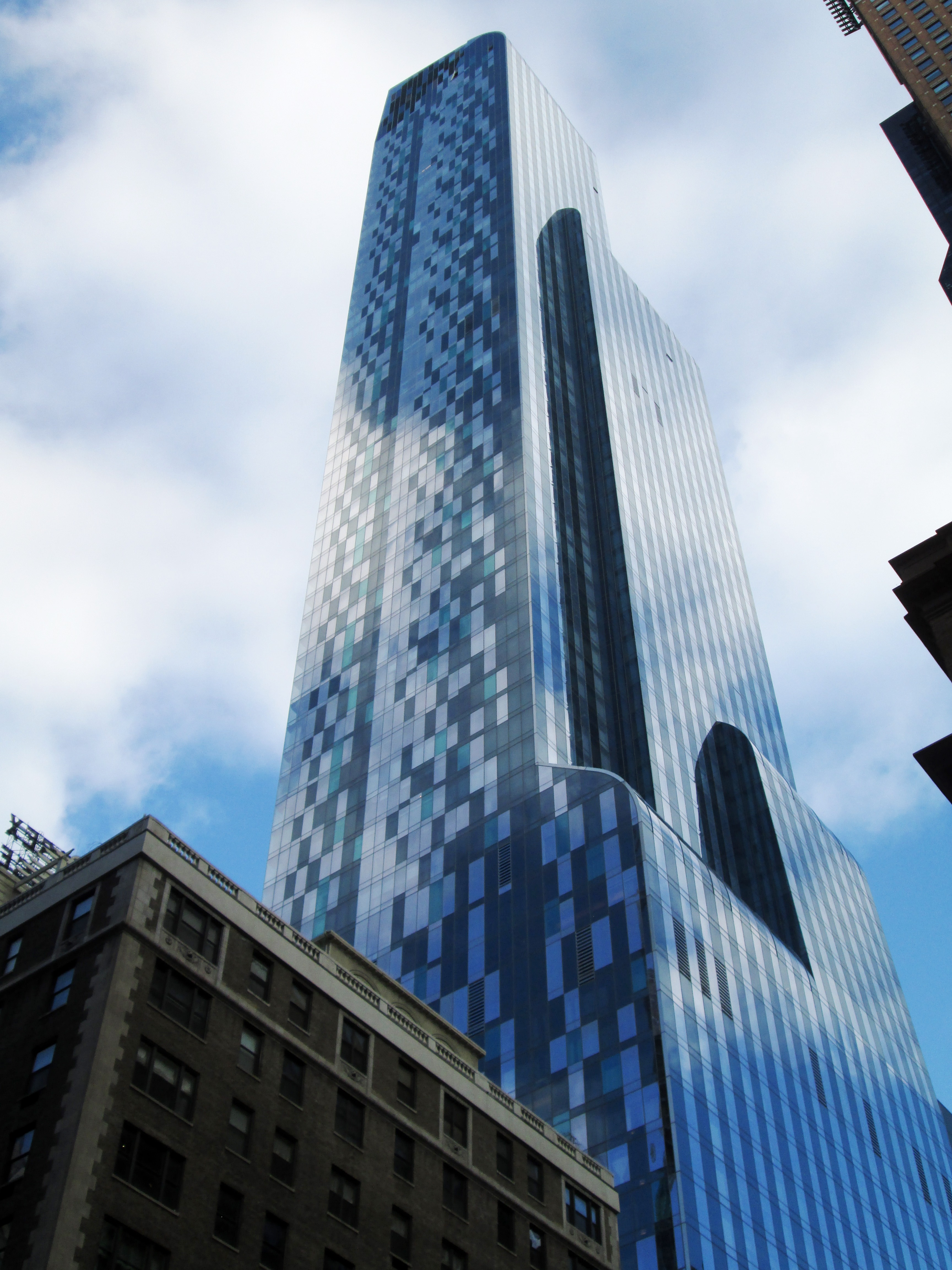
The tower section from Seventh Avenue

=== Planning ===
==== Land acquisition and financing ====
One57 was the first supertall skyscraper to be developed on Billionaires' Row. It was developed by Extell Development Company's founder and president, Gary Barnett, who acquired the property and air rights over fifteen years, signing no fewer than 22 agreements with at least 18 property owners. These assemblages cost $200 million and included the demolition of seven buildings. The first property on One57's present site was acquired in 1998, when Ziel Feldman obtained a small structure at 157 West 57th Street from the music label Forrell & Thomas, selling it to Barnett. At first, Barnett said he wanted to build a 40-story, 300,000 sq ft (28,000 m^{2}) building for $300 million. He soon envisioned a larger building with views of Central Park as the assemblage got larger and markets started rising. By the mid-2000s, as he expanded his land acquisitions and air rights purchases, Barnett realized that he could construct a supertall skyscraper with up to 550,000 square feet (51,000 m^{2}) of space.

Barnett acquired a small building at 161 West 57th Street in 2001, and he had obtained the air rights over 165 West 57th Street by the next year. The area at the time contained several brownstone townhouses, as well as a parking garage and the Park Savoy hotel. Barnett convinced residents of the nearby Alwyn Court and Joyce Manor, as well as members of the Nippon Club, to sell him their buildings' air rights. Even though Barnett was able to acquire the garage and townhouses, he did not buy the Park Savoy because the building's owners asked $80 million, almost eight times what Barnett was willing to pay. Barnett had hired de Portzamparc by 2005, asking the architect to prepare preliminary designs for a skyscraper on 57th Street, though the location of this building was not yet finalized.

By 2006, Barnett had amassed two assemblages of land to the east and west of the Calvary Baptist Church, whose officials had not responded to several inquiries from Barnett or his staff. Due to restrictions regarding air rights transfers in New York City, (Note: In New York City, unless there is a zoning subdistrict across which air rights could be distributed, air rights could typically only be transferred to adjacent sites.) Barnett usually would not have been able to erect a large building on either site without acquiring the church itself. That year, Calvary agreed to sell 45,000 square feet (4,200 m^{2}) of its air rights to Barnett for $28.6 million, thereby allowing Barnett to consolidate the air rights from both plots of land that he owned. Around 2007, Barnett was introduced to Khadem al-Qubaisi, head of Emirati investment funds Aabar Investments and Tasameem Real Estate Company. Al-Qubaisi eventually agreed to fund the project. (Note: According to The New York Times, the initial funding came from Tasameem, while Aabar contributed additional funding later. The Wall Street Journal reports that by early 2009, Barnett had received another $250 million from al-Qubaisi; this funding probably came from Aabar.)

The structures at 151 through 161 West 57th Street were being demolished by May 2007, when Barnett announced that a residential and hotel building with at least 50 stories would be built on the site. By then, he was contemplating a structure of up to 90 stories overlooking Central Park. Demolition was completed that November. No further progress had been made by the following August when the New York Post reported that Extell had not yet filed plans with the New York City Department of Buildings. Although al-Qubaisi had pledged at least $400 million toward the project, this was not yet enough for Barnett to get a construction loan, especially amid the 2008 financial crisis. Aabar and Tasameem eventually raised their combined investment to $650 million, while Extell put up $50 million. Despite the precarious global financial situation, al-Qubaisi told Barnett that "There will be buyers".

==== Initial designs ====
Plans for excavation were filed in November 2008. The following month, the media reported that the website of project contractor Aegis Security Design indicated that the site would include a Park Hyatt hotel, along with stores and luxury condominiums. At the time, Extell was consulting with city agencies to purchase air rights from neighboring sites, including the Alwyn Court and 165 West 57th Street. The air rights transfers would allow the developer to construct a tower with up to 830,000 ft^{2} (77,000 m^{2}). An early plan to erect a 1,400 ft-tall (430 m) tower was changed after the financial crisis, as well as the inability to acquire a neighboring site. In the meantime, seven buildings on the site were demolished.

Plans for the tower were filed in March 2009. SLCE Architects was listed as the architect of record, with input from Frank Williams and Costas Kondylis, although de Portzamparc was also rumored to be involved. The plans called for a 73-story, 953 ft (290 m) tower with 210 hotel rooms on the lowest twenty floors, amenity rooms on the 21st story, a mechanical space on the 46th story, and 136 residences on the other stories between floors 22 and 72. De Portzamparc's involvement was confirmed in a September 2009 article in French newspaper Le Figaro. Barnett asked the interior designer Thomas Juul-Hansen to help design the building's interiors. Juul-Hansen later reflected that he was initially incredulous at Barnett's request, saying that the financial situation was so bad that "people were standing on window ledges, figuring out which car to land on", but he eventually took the job.

In November 2009, Aabar announced it had paid Extell for a majority stake in the construction of 157 West 57th Street. Barnett was contemplating selling apartments for up to $100 million. The development was to be the first major project in New York City after the Great Recession. In 2010, the city's unemployment rate was high, at 10%, and many major projects had been either canceled or delayed. Even for existing luxury developments, apartment asking prices had been reduced by up to 20% compared with before the recession, and sales of condominiums in Manhattan had dropped 60% between the first quarters of 2008 and 2009. Charles V. Bagli of The New York Times called Barnett's decision a "ambitious, even risky undertaking". Nonetheless, Barnett hoped that the apartments could be sold to the ultra-wealthy nouveau riche in developing countries, who could buy the apartments as an investment. According to Juul-Hansen, the overall design was redone "three or four times" before the final design was created. When 157 West 57th Street was being built, Extell design executive Roy Kim went to London for inspiration, observing the design features of the One Hyde Park apartment complex.

=== Construction ===
==== Early work ====
Partial work permits for 157 West 57th Street were issued in September 2009. Foundation work started in 2009 and took over a year, because of the difficulty of digging two basement levels and the building's supports. Aside from the foundation work, details on the construction process remained scarce. Revised plans were submitted to the Department of Buildings in March 2010. The changes included adding two floors, combining some of the units into duplex apartments, and enclosing some of the setback terraces that had been included in the original design. Two months later, the media announced that the development would be called Carnegie 57. Upon its expected completion in 2013, Carnegie 57 was to surpass the Trump World Tower as the city's tallest residential building, with a height of just over 1,000 ft (300 m). (Note: Sources disagree on whether the height would have been exactly 1,000 feet (300 m), 1,004 feet (306 m), or 1,005 feet (306 m).) Few other luxury skyscrapers in New York City were being built at the time, although several other condominium projects were underway across Manhattan.

The main contractor, Lendlease, started constructing the skyscraper's reinforced columns in August 2010. At the time, Barnett said Extell was negotiating with a potential lender for a $1.3 billion loan. Hyatt and Extell announced details of the building's Park Hyatt New York hotel in November 2010. In May 2011, the project was officially renamed One57, a reference to its house number of 157 and to the fact that the building would be located on 57th Street. This rebranding was made in advance of the expected launch of sales for the building. By that July, construction had reached the 22nd floor. Extell received a $700 million construction loan for the project in October 2011 from a syndicate led by the Bank of America, which included Banco Santander, Abu Dhabi International Bank, and Capital One. Of this loan, $375 million was to be paid off by the expected opening of the Park Hyatt hotel. Barnett also shared a condominium offering plan with the Attorney General of New York's office, detailing the building's proposed apartment prices.

After Russian businessman Dmitry Rybolovlev paid $88 million for a unit at the nearby 15 Central Park West in late 2011—making it the most expensive residence ever sold in New York City at the time—Barnett filed plans to increase apartment prices at One57. The revised plans called for at least two apartments to be listed for more than $100 million; one of these, the topmost penthouse, would be the city's most expensive residence at $110 million. Sales at One57 launched in December 2011. A sales center was opened at the nearby Fuller Building, where prospective buyers could see interior photographs or floor plans and listen to a video about One57. Potential buyers were shown an idealized rendering of the building, which omitted the blotches and stripes on the facade, a source of derision for architectural critics. The smallest units (starting at $3.5 million) and the two-bedroom units (starting at $6.5 million) both sold quickly. At the end of that month, Sotheby's International Realty broker Elizabeth Sample said that many millionaires and billionaires had expressed interest in the building's sales showroom. Barnett hired three sales agents from real-estate brokerage Corcoran Sunshine to lead sales. There was so much interest in the building that the agents sometimes scheduled tours to prospective residents one after the other, and some repeat visitors to the sales office were blacklisted after failing to provide their financials.

==== Completion and incidents ====
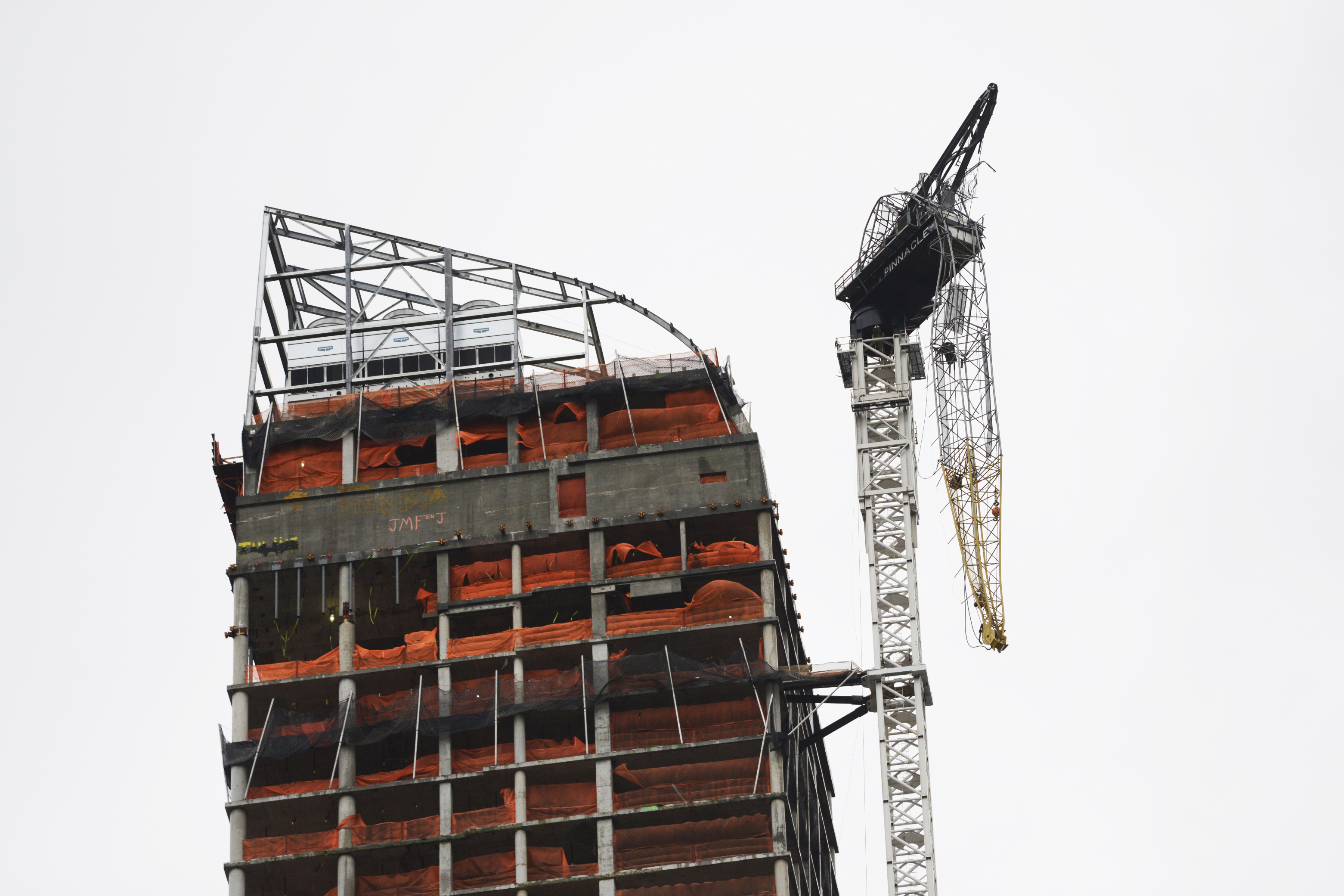
Dangling construction crane at the top of the building on the day after Hurricane Sandy

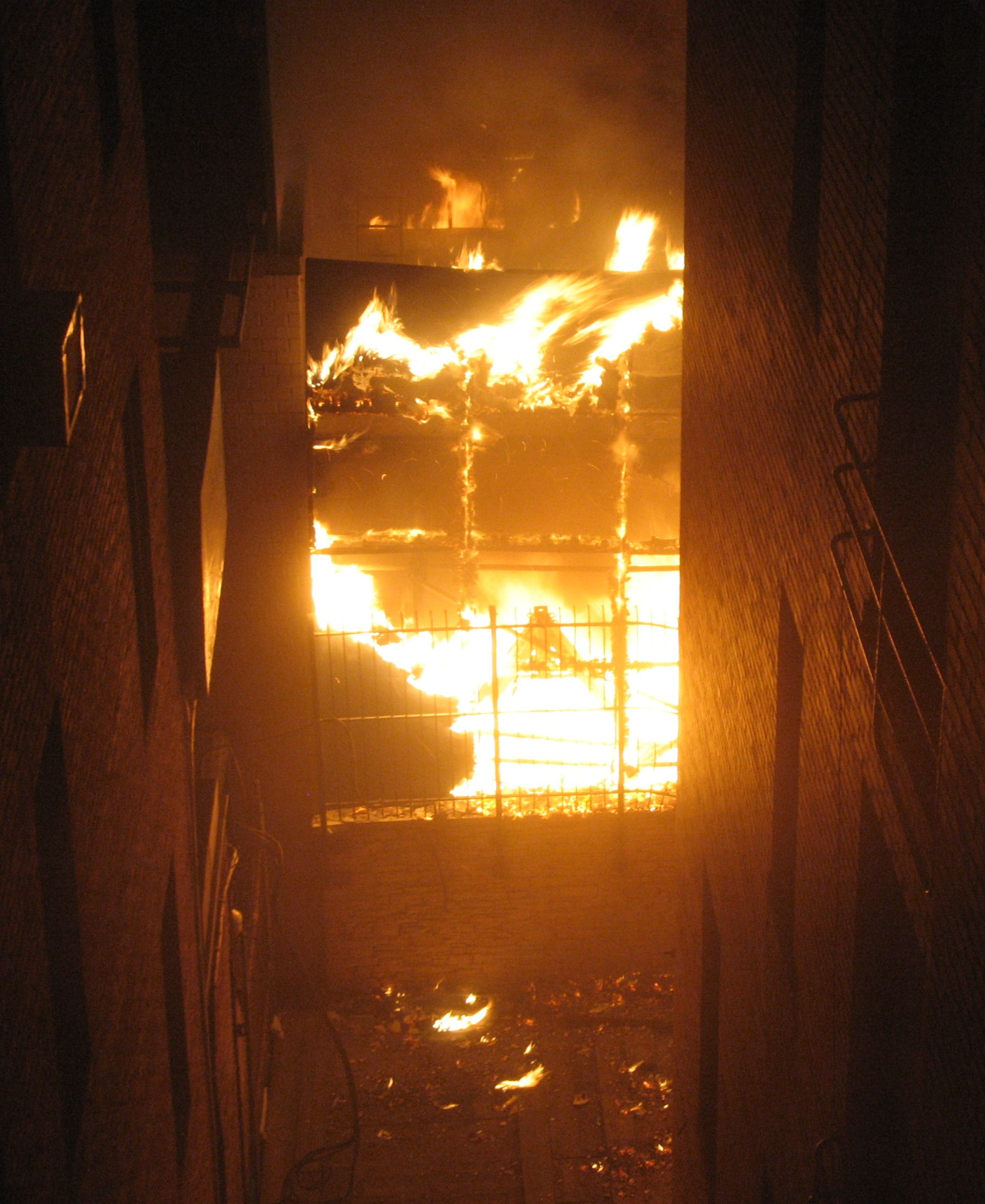
Fire in 2014

Facade installation was underway by January 2012. The next month, the New York Daily News reported that brokers had already earned a combined $3 million from commissions for selling apartments at One57. By the next May, Extell announced that One57 was 50 percent sold with $1 billion in transactions; buyers for the building's condos came from all over the world. One of the sales was for a 10,923 sq ft (1,014.8 m^{2}) duplex penthouse on the 89th and 90th floors, which sold for $90 million, then a citywide record. The high asking prices for condominiums at One57 prompted residents at the nearby CitySpire skyscraper to market their apartments at similarly high prices, including a penthouse listed at $100 million.

Framework for the top floor was completed by mid-2012. On October 29, 2012, in the aftermath of Hurricane Sandy, the construction crane on the building partially collapsed. Thousands of residents were required to evacuate, some with a few minutes' notice. The crane had been inspected a week earlier and considered in good shape, leading city officials to call the boom's failure a freakish occurrence, and it took a week to remove the damaged boom. The incident prompted several lawsuits, including a suit from area dentists who claimed that their income had declined, and the New York City Department of Buildings (DOB) received multiple complaints about the worksite. In May 2013, Extell announced it would hoist a new crane, following approval from the DOB. The co-op board at the Alwyn Court attempted to block the replacement of the boom, but the crane was hoisted as planned after Extell and the Alwyn signed an undisclosed agreement. Displaced residents of the neighboring Alwyn Court and Briarcliff apartment buildings received up to $1,500 each. Barnett later said that apartment sales started to decline after the crane was damaged.

One57's monopoly on New York City's ultra-luxury supertall market was broken in early 2013, when Harry Macklowe began developing 432 Park Avenue. That October, the crane experienced another mechanical failure that caused a closure of the surrounding block of 57th Street. The crane was removed by the next month. In March 2014, a fire broke out in the loading dock of One57, spreading into the courtyard behind the building and then onto the adjacent property at 152 West 58th Street. Later the same year, the building's condominium sales office was moved to One57's 41st floor. Some work on One57's facade continued through 2015, during which there were three incidents in which glass fell from the facade. After the third incident, when a slab of plexiglass fell from the 22nd floor in March 2015, a stop-work order temporarily halted construction on the building. The stop-work order was rescinded two days later.

=== Use ===
==== Early sales ====
The building was substantially finished in 2014. Originally, the cheapest units were the staff's studio apartments, which were marketed for $1.59 million each. Each of the units on the top eleven floors was listed at no less than $50 million, and the penthouse was marketed at $110 million. The building's units were collectively marketed for a combined $2 billion. Monthly charges for individual units varied; a three-bedroom unit on floor 41 had a monthly fee of about $4,600 while a penthouse on floor 87 had a monthly fee of $13,000. The first contracts at One57 were finalized in December 2013, and 27 owners had moved into their homes in the first six months.

By May 2014, three-fourths of the residential units had been sold, with sales on thirteen units having been closed and sixty more in contract. By the end of the year, the total value of condominium sales at the building had surpassed $1.5 billion. The first resale at One57 occurred in October 2014, when a unit was resold for $34 million, a $3.45 million increase from the initial sale price five months prior. Competition from other developments on Billionaires' Row had caused sales to stall at the 75% point. Among One57's issues was that 57th Street was not traditionally considered an upscale address, while the nearby 432 Park Avenue benefited from being on an avenue that was already widely recognized as being high-end. As such, One57's sales team advertised the building's proximity to structures such as Time Warner Center and its hotel-like amenities. Another drawback was the building's design, which was highly controversial among architectural critics, to the point that brokers sometimes took prospective buyers through a rear entrance so that they did not have to see the lobby.

One57 had become the city's most expensive building per square foot by 2015, with residences selling for an average of $5,629/ft^{2} ($60,590/m^{2}). The high prices were reflective of the fact that the developer was marketing the apartments as "trophy properties" from the outset, whereas previously, a buyer would have been required to combine several apartments. Although condominium prices at One57 had increased to an average of about $6,500 per square foot ($70,000/m^{2}), this was less than the average rate of $8,500 per square foot ($91,000/m^{2}) at the nearby 220 Central Park South. In addition, sales at Billionaires' Row's luxury developments had slowed considerably by the mid-2010s, with apartments being sold at deeply discounted rates. At One57, there was particularly low demand for units near where the construction crane had struck the facade.

==== Mid- and late 2010s ====
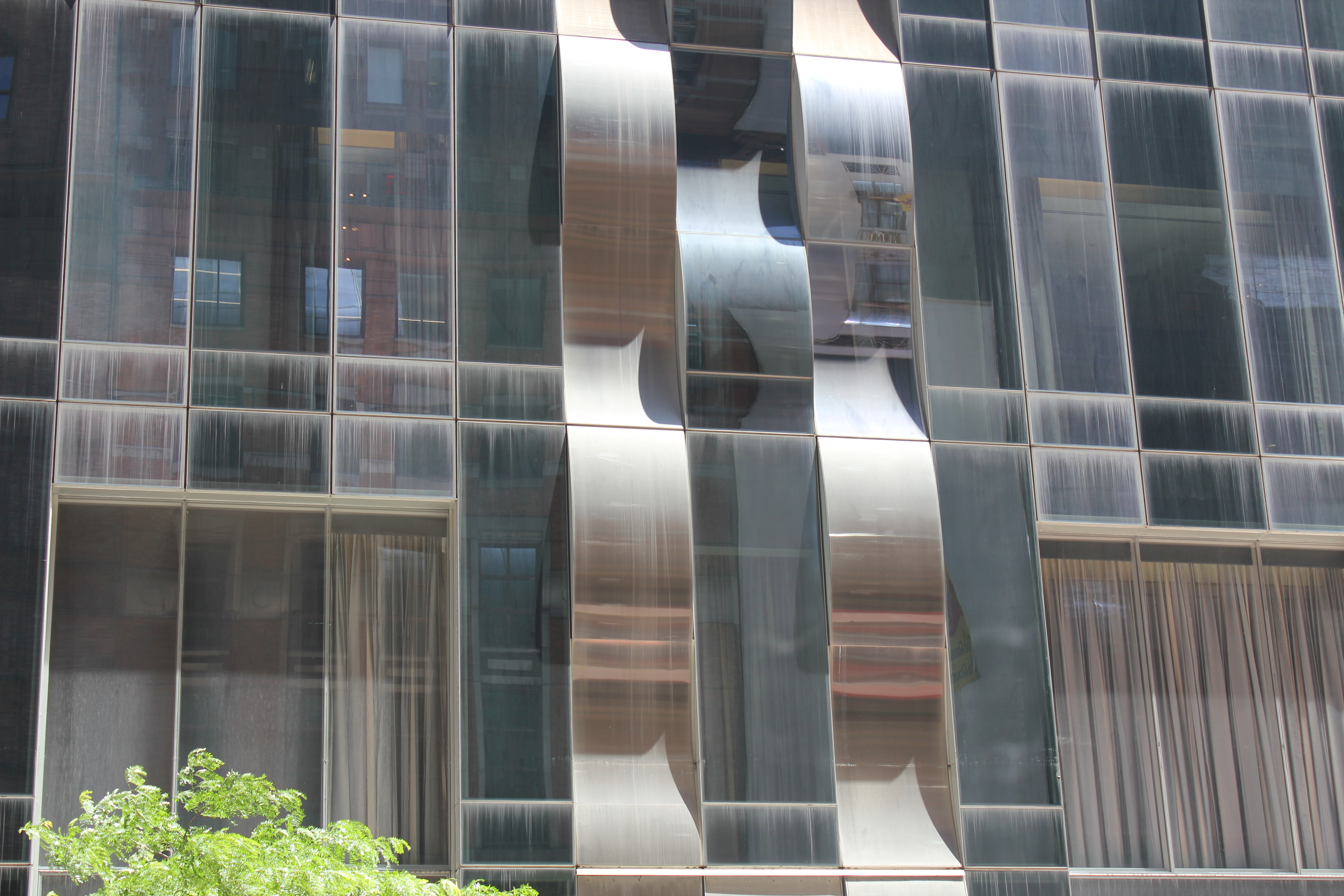
Wavy facade strips at the lowest floors of One57

Extell had received a 421-a tax exemption for One57, which permitted a 94 percent tax abatement in exchange for constructing affordable housing elsewhere. Several politicians opposed the exemption, including city comptroller John Liu, who described it as billionaires' subsidy. In May 2015, as part of the program, Extell was renting out 38 apartments on the seven stories immediately above the hotel. The rentals, which consisted of one- to four-bedroom units measuring 1,021 to 3,466 ft^{2} (94.9 to 322.0 m^{2}), were marketed at between $12,000 and $50,000 per month. The rental units were still extremely expensive compared to other developments in the city; The Wall Street Journal estimated that potential renter would need a minimum annual income of $534,000 to rent a one-bedroom unit and $2 million for a three-bedroom unit. By that November, Extell was seeking to sell the rental portion of the building for $250 million. With a general decline in the rate of luxury rental agreements, Extell changed its plans in April 2016 and instead marketed the rental units as condominiums. Ultimately, Extell only created 66 affordable units in the Bronx using the tax abatement for One57, which normally could have been used to create 370 affordable units.

Media outlets reported in 2016 that the International Petroleum Investment Company—the parent company of the building's main financier, Aabar—was linked to the 1Malaysia Development Berhad scandal. Because Aabar's head, al-Qubaisi, had been implicated in the scandal, the financing of One57 was investigated as well. The first foreclosure in the building, for an apartment owned by heiress Sheri Izadpanah, took place in May 2017. after Izadpanah had unsuccessfully tried to sell it for a year. The same year, Nigerian businessman Kola Aluko was investigated for money laundering; the suspected laundering included his purchase of a penthouse apartment at One57. Aluko's $51 million apartment was foreclosed upon and was ultimately sold for $36 million in September 2017, the largest foreclosure auction in city history. The foreclosures, amid a slowing luxury real estate market and an increase in foreclosures citywide, raised public scrutiny about the viability of Billionaires' Row's skyscrapers. They also negatively impacted One57's reputation among real-estate brokers.

Amid a downturn in New York City's luxury real estate market, Extell unveiled new buyers' incentives in 2018, offering to waive between three and five years of common charges and pay 50% of broker's commissions. During that time, the average price of units at One57 declined from $5,872/ft^{2} ($63,210/m^{2}) in 2014 to $3,900/ft^{2} ($42,000/m^{2}) in 2020. The downturn was severe enough that Nikki Field, a broker who had sold several of the condo units, told residents not to resell their condos until she told them to, as they would have otherwise lost large amounts of money.

==== 2020s to present ====
One57's luxury-sales downturn was worsened by a general decrease in real estate activity in 2020 due to the COVID-19 pandemic in New York City. One57 contained the most expensive residence sold in the city that June: an 88th-story apartment that sold for $28 million, forty-one percent lower than its original price. The COVID-19 pandemic also forced the Park Hyatt hotel to close from March 21, 2020, to April 1, 2021. By early 2021, only five units remained unsold. Though some units were resold for a profit during that time, many others were resold at significant discounts. One unit sold in January 2021 for less than half its original listing price, and The Wall Street Journal reported the same June that some owners had seen "percentage losses in the double digits" during the preceding years. The Real Deal magazine attributed the reduced prices to the existence of "newer, nicer and taller trophy properties" nearby. An August 2025 analysis by The Real Deal found that, of 35 original owners who resold their apartments after 2015, almost ninety percent had sold their apartments at a loss.

== Residents ==
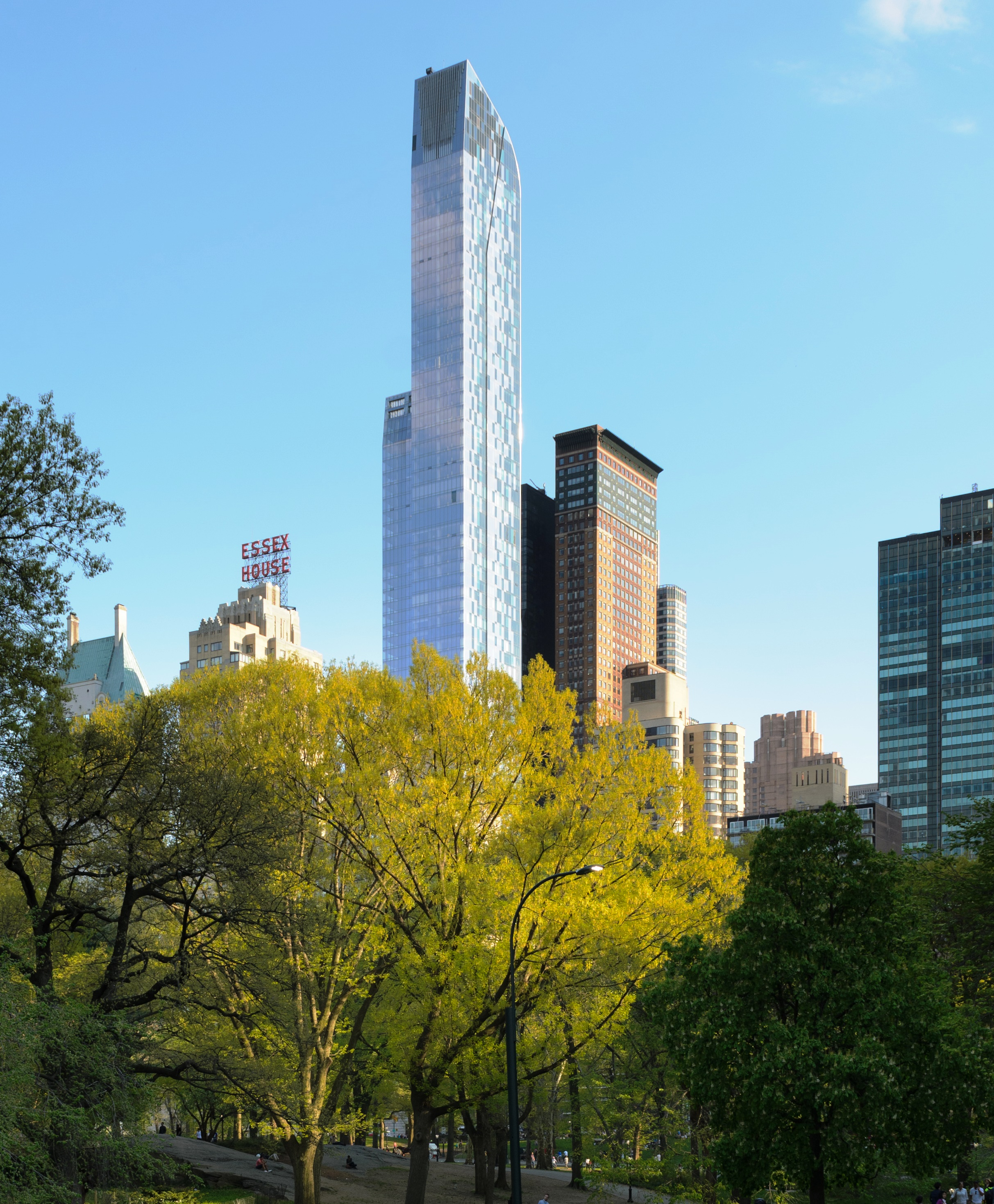
One57 rises above Central Park

When sales of One57 were launched, Barnett initially did not identify buyers, though nine billionaires had purchased units at One57 by September 2012. Many buyers had previously owned property at other luxury developments such as 15 Central Park West. By late 2013, One57 management characterized more than half the buyers as foreigners, with fifteen percent being from China; a substantial number of buyers also came from the Middle East. The most expensive apartments were located on floor numbers 86–88, reflecting the status of "8" as a lucky number in Chinese culture, due to the high number of Chinese buyers. The New York Times published so many headlines about high-profile sales in the tower that The Observer said, "It would be difficult for even the most creative writer to make sale after sale at the same new-construction building sound fresh."

According to the bylaws of One57's condominium board, residents could have up to two "orderly domestic" pets, of which residents were required to send photos to the board. Certain pets, such as pigs, hens, rabbits, and gerbils, are banned. Guests could not bring pets. In addition, window decorations are banned, and the board has to approve window curtains and blinds. Because the building is a condominium and not a housing cooperative, new residents do not require approval from a condominium board, nor are any background checks conducted for prospective residents. Numerous buyers acquired their apartments for investment purposes, rather than using them as residences.

The building was initially maintained by a staff of eighteen, (Note: According to Samtani 2014, the condo filings with the New York attorney general's office indicated there would technically be 18.4 employees. This includes seven porters, two handymen, and one resident manager, as well as 4.2 concierges and doormen each.) which was relatively small in comparison to other residential developments in New York City. This took into account the fact that many residents were not expected to live at One57 year-round and, as such, a larger staff was not needed. Barnett also occupied a one-bedroom unit at One57 so he could manage his work in New York City even as his family lived in Monsey, New York.

=== Notable buyers ===
The building set the record for the city's second-most expensive residence in 2012, when hedge fund manager Bill Ackman paid $91.5 million to obtain the "winter garden" penthouse, though this sale was not publicized for several years. The highest penthouse was sold for $100.5 million in 2014; (Note: The record was broken in January 2019 when Ken Griffin paid $238 million or $240 million for a unit at 220 Central Park South.) the buyer's identity was initially kept secret, but the media subsequently announced that the buyer had been Michael Dell, the CEO of Dell Technologies. The Prime Minister of Qatar, Sheikh Hamad bin Jassim bin Jaber Al Thani, agreed to purchase a penthouse unit for $100 million. Other notable buyers included apparel-firm billionaires Silas Chou and Lawrence Stroll, as well as businessmen Kola Aluko, Liu Yiqian, and Robert Herjavec. The youngest buyer on record was a two-year-old Chinese girl, whose mother paid $6.5 million for a unit in 2013 so her daughter could use it when she attended college in fifteen years.

Several prospective residents had their contracts canceled. Barnett refused to sell to British developer Nick Candy and another buyer after they both separately indicated their intentions to renovate their apartments. Candy had wanted to resell his apartment immediately after he had renovated it, while the anonymous buyer was unwilling to cooperate with Extell to minimize disruption for neighboring units. Entrepreneur Michael Hirtenstein's purchase was canceled after he hired a worker to film his unit, in spite of Barnett's request that buyers not see their units before purchase.

== Impact ==
=== Architectural reception ===
During the building's construction, The Real Deal critic James Gardner wrote that, because of One57's construction, the Central Park South skyline would change "more fundamentally and definitively than it has in well over a generation". Gardner compared the building's impact on the skyline to that of 30 Rockefeller Plaza in Rockefeller Center, which was the tallest building in its area from the 1930s to the 1950s. Alexander Garvin said of the building, "I hope it's never finished. When it is, we're done." Ralph Gardner Jr. of The Wall Street Journal (no relation to the Real Deal writer) said the building was so tall that, viewed from Central Park, it felt like the structure was in the park itself.

When One57 was finished, it was heavily criticized. One57 was named "Worst Building of the Year" in 2014 by Curbed, which said, "Pretty much everyone (or at least most archicritics) agrees that its wavy blue facade is ugly." New York magazine's architecture critic Justin Davidson said that One57 was "so clumsily gaudy that a fellow architect surmised [that de Portzamparc] must be a socialist pranking the plutocrats", and he continued to regard One57 as "repulsive" in 2021. James Russell characterized the facade as "endless acres of cheap-looking frameless glass in cartoonish stripes and blotches". Michael Kimmelman, in The New York Times, described One57 as having a "pox of tinted panes", while Robbie Whelan said that the design "tries to draw too much attention to itself", even considering 57th Street's architectural diversity. Paul Goldberger described One57 as having "garish glass" and considered the building as more suited to Las Vegas. Donald Trump, a rival of Barnett's, called the building one of the ugliest he had seen. By contrast, Carter Horsley wrote that the facade was not necessarily "random" but rather "impart an added sense of motion", and Goldberger said the lavish interiors provided highly-coveted views of Central Park and the skyline.

One57 also received commentary on its shape. Matthew Shaer wrote that the building resembled a "gleaming, tumescent phallus" that stood out from its surroundings, while the Times' Kimmelman characterized the building's form as "cascade of clunky curves". Robin Finn of the Times wrote that the building was "a spike of bluish glass that does not scrape the Midtown sky as much as puncture it". Ralph Gardner wrote for The Wall Street Journal that One57's construction blocked the views of the "claustrophobic thicket of towers in the Carnegie Hall vicinity", including Metropolitan Tower, Carnegie Hall Tower, and CitySpire. Davidson called the building's massing "tall and clunky, preening yet graceless". Architectural historian Robert A. M. Stern wrote that observers widely considered One57 a "force of nature", contrasting with de Portzamparc's earlier LVMH Tower—a smaller building often likened to a flower—on the same street.

Of One57's presence in general, Rick Hampson of USA Today wrote: "One57 exemplifies a new type of skyscraper—very tall, improbably slender, ostentatiously opulent—that is reshaping a famous skyline composed mostly of bulky office buildings." There were also complaints that the building was blocking southward views from Central Park. According to Ralph Gardner, the 57th Street facade "show[ed] some potential" and the north facade could help the building blend with the skyline, but the massing "appear[ed] an undisguised attempt to maximize air rights and monopolize park views for plutocrats". De Portzamparc was embarrassed about his design, refusing to participate in interview requests or press events.

=== Influence and media ===
When the building was being constructed, New York magazine called the project "an act of extreme confidence or epic folly (or both)", since the city had not fully recovered from the recession. After it was completed, a writer for Bloomberg News wrote that "Barnett has become the unlikely arbiter of stratospherically priced real estate in New York." Elizabeth Goldstein, the president of the Municipal Art Society, said the construction of One57 had precipitated the development of other supertall skyscrapers in New York City, many of which used zoning loopholes to rise higher than would normally be allowed. For this reason, Paul Goldberger called One57 "the first and the worst" of the city's supertall skyscrapers, but he said it was not possible to "freeze the city" in terms of development. Katherine Clarke, author of the book Billionaires Row, said that the building had gained a reputation as an emblem of severe wealth inequality amid the New York City housing shortage and high rates of homelessness.

In 2014, PBS described One57 in a fifty-five-minute clip entitled "The Billionaire Building", the second part of a four-part documentary entitled Super Skyscrapers. The tower became less popular several years after its opening, being overtaken by other supertall towers on Billionaires' Row. The 2017 book Life at the Top: New York's Most Exceptional Apartment Buildings, published three years after One57's completion, did not mention the building even as it mentioned 432 Park Avenue.

== See also ==
- List of tallest buildings in New York City
- List of tallest buildings in the United States
- List of tallest residential buildings
- Sliver building
