= 50 West 66th Street =

Under-construction skyscraper in Manhattan, New York

Coordinates: 40.7730°N 73.9803°W

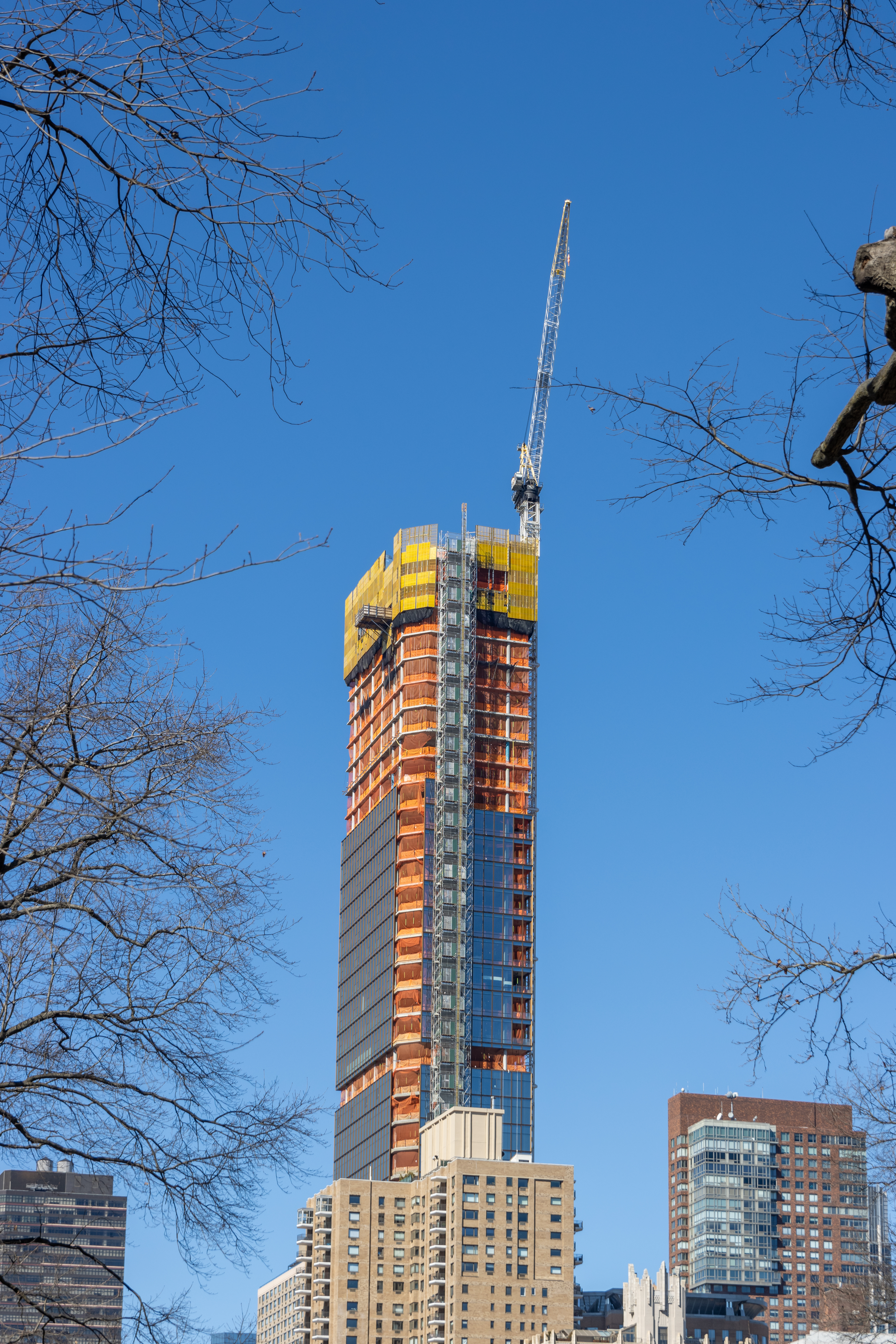
- Under Construction in 2024
- Interactive map of the 50 West 66th Street area

General information
- Status: Completed
- Type: Mixed-use
- Construction started: 2018
- Estimated completion: 2025
- Opening: 2026

Height
- Roof: 775 feet (236 m)

Technical details
- Floor count: 52

Design and construction
- Architect: Snøhetta
- Developer: Extell Development Company

50 West 66th Street is a skyscraper currently under construction for the Upper West Side of Manhattan in New York City. It is being developed by Extell Development Company and designed by Snøhetta. The building will contain setbacks, private loggias, chamfered corners, and a 16th-floor communal terrace. The facade will be made of limestone and burnished bronze beneath the 16th floor and glass with burnished-bronze chamfers above that floor.

The building was originally to be 25 stories, but the plans were later changed. When plans for an enlarged 775-foot (236 m), 69-story tower were released in late 2017, the tower faced immediate opposition by those living in the neighborhood. The city approved the tower, overriding neighborhood opposition, in December 2018. After neighborhood groups filed a lawsuit to block the project, claiming that increased height was due to misuse of mechanical space, the New York City Board of Standards and Appeals voted to approve the building permit in January 2020. The building topped out during late February 2024. That July, Extell refinanced the building with a $1.2 billion loan.
