= The Orion (skyscraper) =

Residential skyscraper in Manhattan, New York

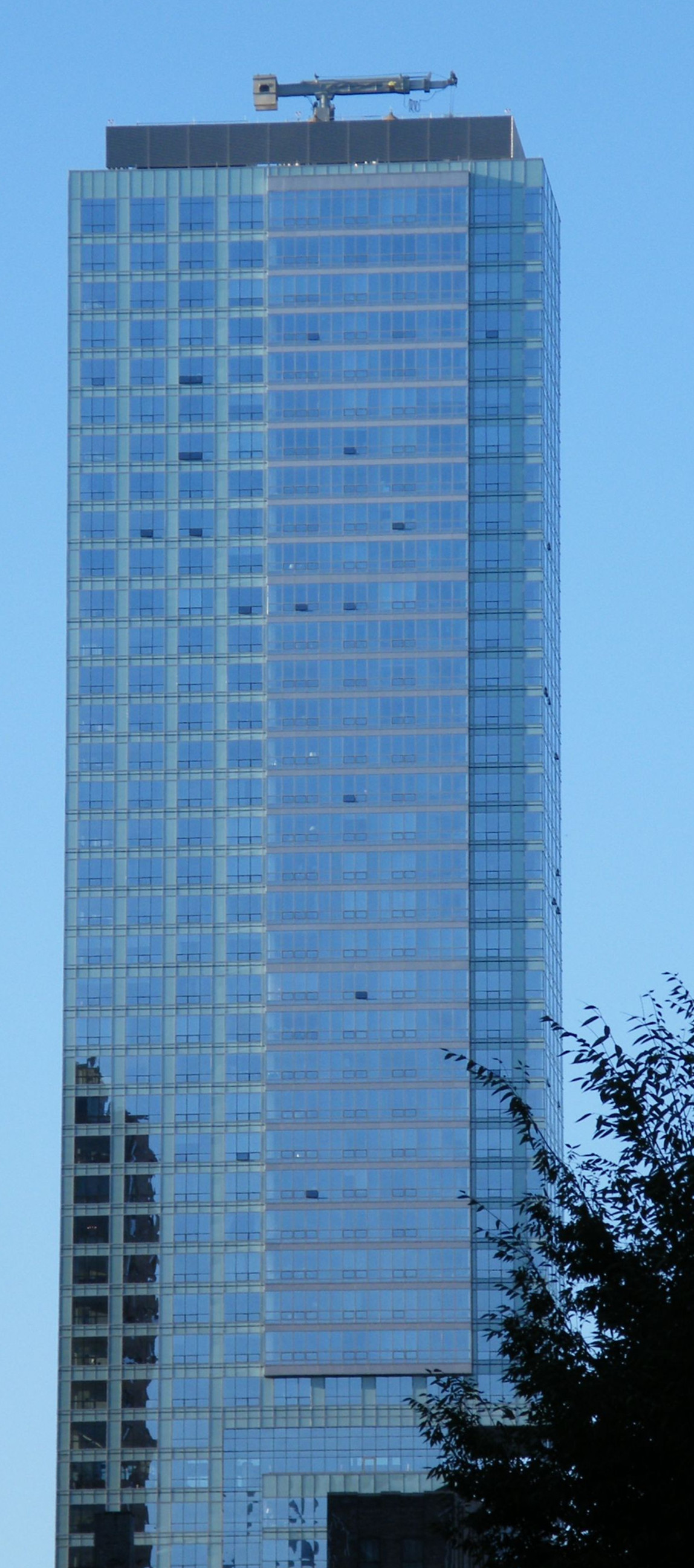
- (2008)
- Interactive map of the The Orion area

General information
- Status: Completed
- Type: Residential
- Location: 350 West 42nd Street; Manhattan, New York
- Coordinates: 40°45′29″N 73°59′32″W
- Construction started: 2004
- Opening: 2006

Height
- Antenna spire: 604 ft (184 m)

Technical details
- Floor count: 58
- Floor area: 632,939 sq ft (58,802.0 m^{2})
- Lifts/elevators: 7

Design and construction
- Architect: CetraRuddy
- Developer: Extell Development Company
- Structural engineer: WSP Cantor Seinuk
- Main contractor: Bovis Lend Lease

Other information
- Parking: 200

The Orion is a skyscraper located at 350 West 42nd Street between Eighth and Ninth Avenues in the Hell's Kitchen neighborhood of Manhattan in New York City, New York, U.S. The building rises 604 feet (184 m) above street level, containing 551 residential units across 58 floors, and is the 128th tallest building in New York. Despite its relatively modest height for a skyscraper, the residential building has dominated the 42nd Street landscape west of Times Square since its topout in September 2005, and the building has views of the city in every direction.

The building was designed by the architectural firm CetraRuddy, who also designed One Madison Park.

== Notable incident ==
Cheslie Kryst, the winner of the Miss USA 2019 pageant who lived on the 9th floor, jumped to her death from the 29th floor on January 30, 2022. Her death was determined to be a suicide.
