= Extell Development Company =

American real estate development firm

- Type: Private
- Industry: Real estate development
- Founded: 1989
- Founder: Gary Barnett
- Headquarters: New York City, United States
- Area served: United States
- Key people: Gary Barnett
- Services: Real estate development
- Owner: Gary Barnett
- Website: extell.com

Extell Development Company is an American real estate developer of residential, commercial, retail, hospitality, and mixed-use properties. Founded in 1989 by Gary Barnett, the company is headquartered in New York City. Its portfolio exceeds 20 million square feet. The company has between 125 and 150 employees. Before 2005, it was known as Intell Management and Investment.

In a 2013 survey conducted by The Real Deal, Extell was the most active builder in Manhattan, with at least 11 active projects totalling over five million square feet.

== History ==
Extell Development Company was founded by Gary Barnett in 1989. In the early 2010s, Extell used financing from Abu Dhabi's sovereign wealth funds to build One57, the first "Supertall" residential skyscraper in Midtown Manhattan, which kickstarted the creation of the "Billionaires' Row," a series of super-tall condo towers below Central Park. Extell has also built a number of different buildings on the Upper East Side, in Manhattan.

In 2020, Extell completed Central Park Tower, the world's tallest purely residential building. To finance the 1,550 foot tower Extell relied on financing from the Israeli bond market, the EB-5 visa program and the Chinese-state owned Shanghai Municipal Investment Group.

In 2025, Extell announced plans to build a residential tower the size of the Empire State Building on the location of the former ABC Studios building on West 66th Street (Manhattan) and Columbus Avenue (Manhattan). Although the site's unique zoning allows the developer to build a super-tall luxury skyscraper without requiring any units of affordable housing, Extell has offered to build 121 Affordable housing units at the complex, primarily studios for senior citizens, in an effort to avoid the costly legal battles that plagued 50 West 66th Street.

== Controversies ==
In 2013, Extell was condemned and criticized for their decision of building separate entrances for market rate tenants and subsidized tenants in one or more of their Manhattan high-rise buildings.

In the late 2020s, Extell took advantage of a "mechanical void loophole" in New York City's housing code to extend the height of its development at 50 West 66th Street. Extell planned to increase the building's height by adding a 160-foot void to mechanical spaces, in order to increase the value of units at the top of the building, which would enjoy better views, then revised the plan create three smaller voids. In a 2-2 decision, the city's Board of Standards and Appeals allowed the building to be completed, over the objections of local political leaders and a lawsuit from Landmark West, a local community group. The New York City Council voted to close the mechanical void loophole while construction was underway, but not in time to affect construction.

== Properties ==
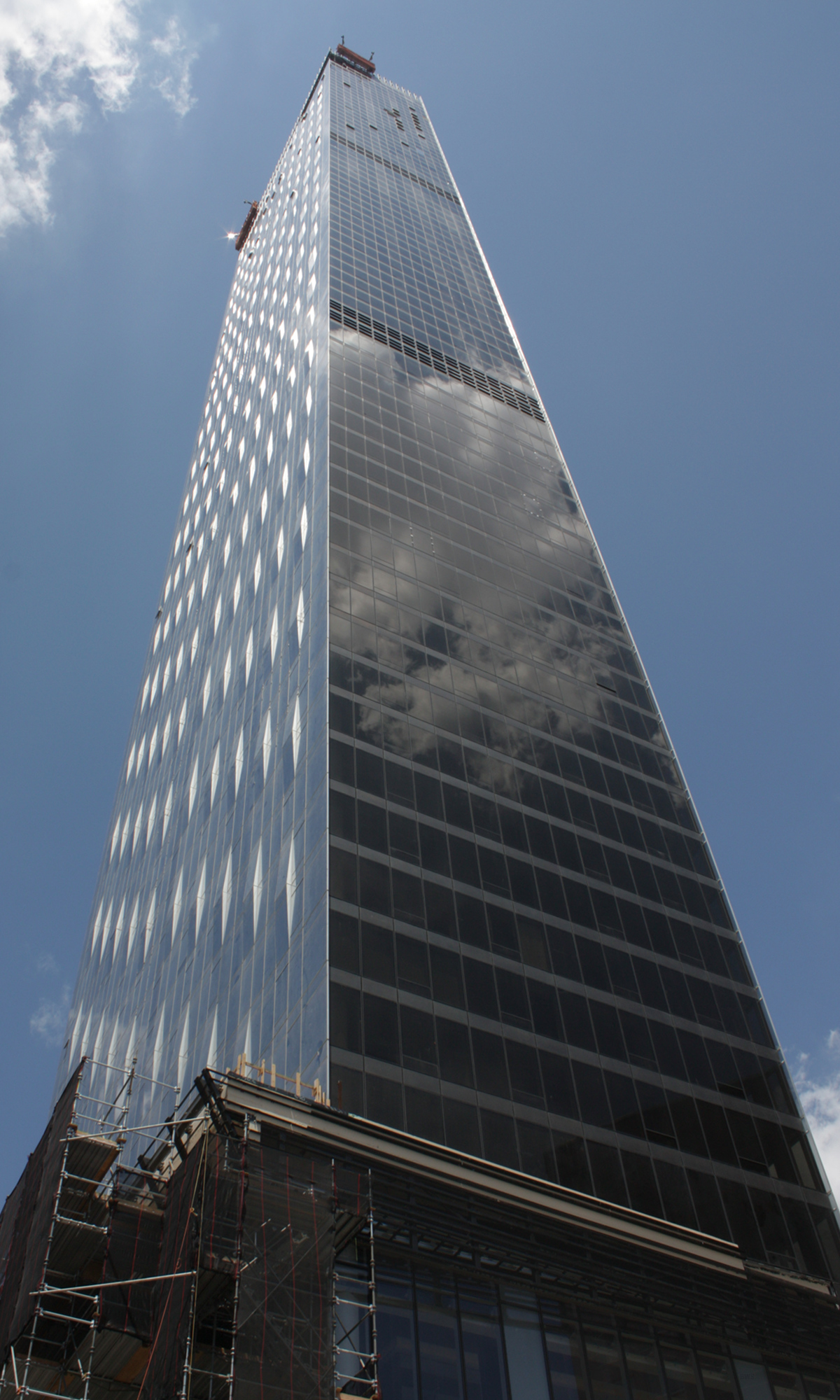
One Manhattan Square nearing completion in 2019

Notable properties owned or developed by the company are:

- 50 West 66th Street
- 995 Fifth Avenue
- Central Park Tower
- One Manhattan Square
- One Riverside Park
- One57
- Riverside South, Manhattan
- The Ariel
- The Orion
- W Times Square
- 1520/1522 First Avenue
- 1637 First Avenue
- Hudson Piers
- Deer Valley
