= Earl Blackwell =

American businessman

- Blackwell pictured around 1960
- Born: Samuel Earl Blackwell Jr. May 3, 1909; Atlanta, Georgia, U.S.
- Died: March 1, 1995 (aged 85); New York City, U.S.

Samuel Earl Blackwell Jr. (May 3, 1909 – March 1, 1995) was an American businessman who was a celebrity promoter and, later, celebrity tracker. In 1939, he founded Celebrity Service, which spawned The Celebrity Bulletin in 1952.

== Early life and career ==
Blackwell was born on May 3, 1909, in Atlanta, Georgia. He became interested in the celebrity lifestyle after caddying for golfer Bobby Jones. He graduated from Oglethorpe University with a journalism degree.

After a brief career in Hollywood in 1932 as an actor, he moved to New York City, where Aries is Rising, a musical comedy he wrote in 1937, starring Constance Collier, had a brief run at the John Golden Theater. While in New York, he founded Celebrity Service, with fellow writer, Boston native Ted Strong, in 1939. They were based on East 54th Street, next door to the El Morocco nightclub, which was at number 154.

Blackwell co-edited Celebrity Register: An Irreverent Compendium of American Quotable Notables with Cleveland Amory in 1963. He also co-wrote two novels — Crystal Clear (1978) and Skyrocket (1980) — both set in the fashion world, with his long-term companion, fashion photographer Eugenia Sheppard.

He was a director of The Broadway Foundation and, from 1957 to 1965, the director of the Mayor's Committee on Scholastic Achievement, which raised money for college scholarships.

=== Celebrity Service ===
As Celebrity Service expanded, it published an International Celebrity Register and an annual Contact Book, in addition to the daily Celebrity Bulletin, which reported on people in the arts, business, education, politics, religion, science and sports. Blackwell later bought Strong out, and he sold the business in 1985. He remained its chairman until his death. Blackwell's assistant for forty years was Vine Phoenix.

== Personal life ==
Around 1960, Blackwell rented the penthouse apartment of The Briarcliffe, at 171 West 57th Street, the former home of Charles K. Eagle. In 1963, one of the parties he held there was displayed in an advert for the Saturday Evening Post.

He had one sibling, his sister Mary Blackwell Alexander.

== Death ==
Blackwell died at Roosevelt Hospital in Manhattan on March 1, 1995, aged 85. A memorial service was held on what would have been his 86th birthday, May 3, 1995, at St. Paul the Apostle Church, 2 Columbus Avenue in Manhattan.
