= Hasegawa Kyūzō =

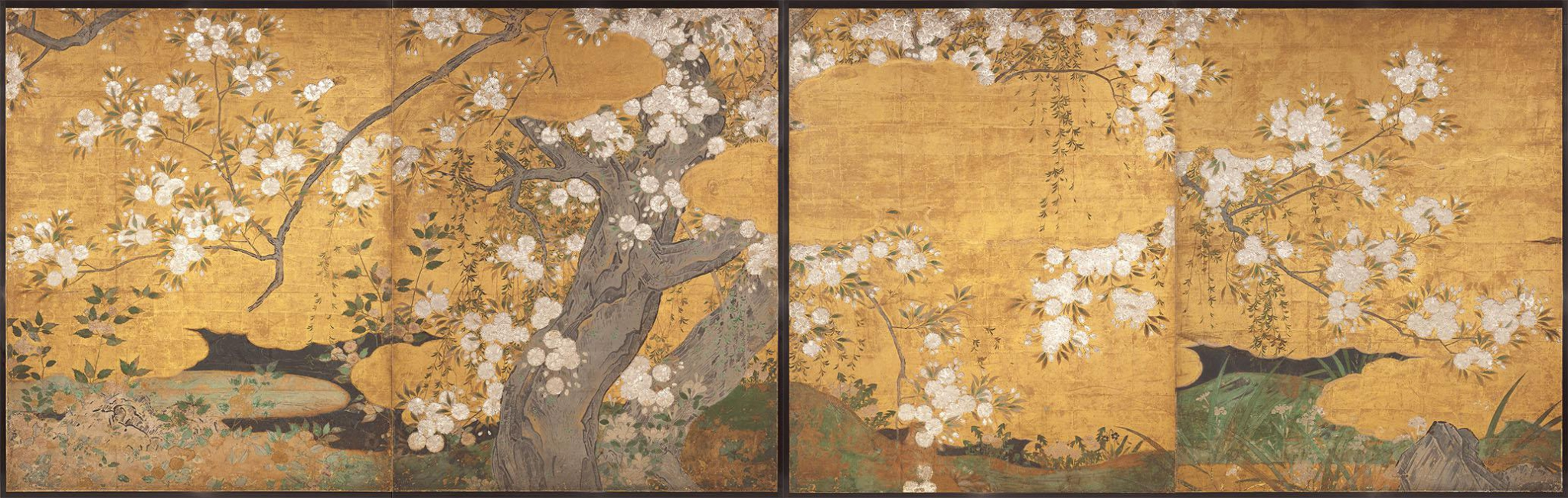
Cherry Tree by Hasegawa Tōhaku and Hasegawa Kyūzō, Chishaku-in, National Treasure

Hasegawa Kyūzō (長谷川久蔵, 1568 (Note: Eiroku 11.) – July 13, 1593 (Note: Date given in the Gregorian calendar. Using the Xuanming calendar and the era name, Kyūzō died on the 15th day of the 6th month, Bunroku 6.)) was the son of Hasegawa Tōhaku, and a painter of the Hasegawa school in the Azuchi–Momoyama period Japan.

Kyūzō was born as the first son between Tōhaku and his first wife Myōjō (妙浄, died 1579).

It is generally surmised that Kyūzō painted on the byōbu (wind screens) for Toyotomi Hideyoshi or other high-ranking Toyotomi supporter. Four of his works remain:

- Asahina Kusa Zuri Hiki Zu 朝比奈草摺曳図, Kiyomizu-dera, 1592, designated an Important Cultural Property
- Sakura Zu 桜図 (Cherry Tree), Chishaku-in (Shōun-ji), circa 1592, a part of Sakura Kaede Zu designated as a National Treasure of Japan
- Ohara Gōkō-zu Byōbu 大原御幸図屏風 (Emperor's Visit to Ohara), Tokyo National Museum
- Gion E-zu 祇園会図 (Gion Festival), Ishikawa Prefectural Museum of Art

Tōhaku intended Kyūzō to be his heir, if it were not for his early death in his mid-20s. Kyūzō was highly acclaimed by Kanō Einō in Honchō Gashi (本朝画史) compiled in 1679 as that the "elegance of his work surpasses his father's, unmatched by none other in the Hasegawa school."
