= Charles K. Eagle =

American businessman

- Pictured around 1928
- Born: 1877 or 1878
- Died: September 2, 1928 (aged 51); The Briarcliffe, New York City, New York

Charles K. Eagle (1867 or 1868 – September 2, 1928) was an American silk merchant who owned one of New York City's largest silk-manufacturing firms in the early 20th century.

== Career ==
In 1906, Eagle was in business with his brother, John H. Eagle (July 24, 1868 – July 24, 1943), at 487 Broome Street in Lower Manhattan. They established the J. H. and C. K. Eagle Company in Shamokin, Pennsylvania, which expanded into several areas of the United States.

The Real Estate Record and Builders' Guide stated on May 13, 1911, that the lot at the corner of Park Avenue and 21st Street, formerly occupied by the New Amsterdam Hotel, had been purchased by "J. H. & C. K. Eagle, one of the largest of the city's silk manufacturing firms". The address is known as "The Eagle Building" today, the work of architects Warren and Wetmore. Four years later, the firm built a silk mill factory on Chestnut Street in Kulpmont, Pennsylvania, at a cost of $1.5 million. The American Silk Journal wrote: "This is undoubtedly the largest mill building project ever undertaken at one time by a single firm in the silk trade, and is a very substantial indication of the remarkable success had by the firm of J. H. & C. K. Eagle since the inception of their business." The mill building was sold to a New York company in 2021.

The brothers also constructed Eagle Silk Mill at Water Street and Lamb's Crossing in Bellefonte, Pennsylvania, in 1922. They also had facilities in other parts of Pennsylvania, including Phoenixville, Gettysburg and Mechanicsburg.

In June 1925, the brothers sold the Eagle Building, which was described by The New York Times as "one of the finest buildings in the section". Upon the death of John in 1943, The New York Times reported that he retired in 1925, and moved to Pasadena, California, living in the 1920-built Marshallia mansion (now Strub Hall, part of Mayfield Senior School) on Grand Avenue, so it is likely Charles continued on alone for last three years of his life. The company moved to 265 Madison Avenue in Manhattan, but kept space for retail at its former home until 1929, a year after Charles' death.

== Personal life ==
Eagle was married twice; firstly to Edith Beach Eagle, with whom he had a son and a daughter. After divorcing Edith, he married Tecla (or Thecla) Jensen.

== The Briarcliffe ==
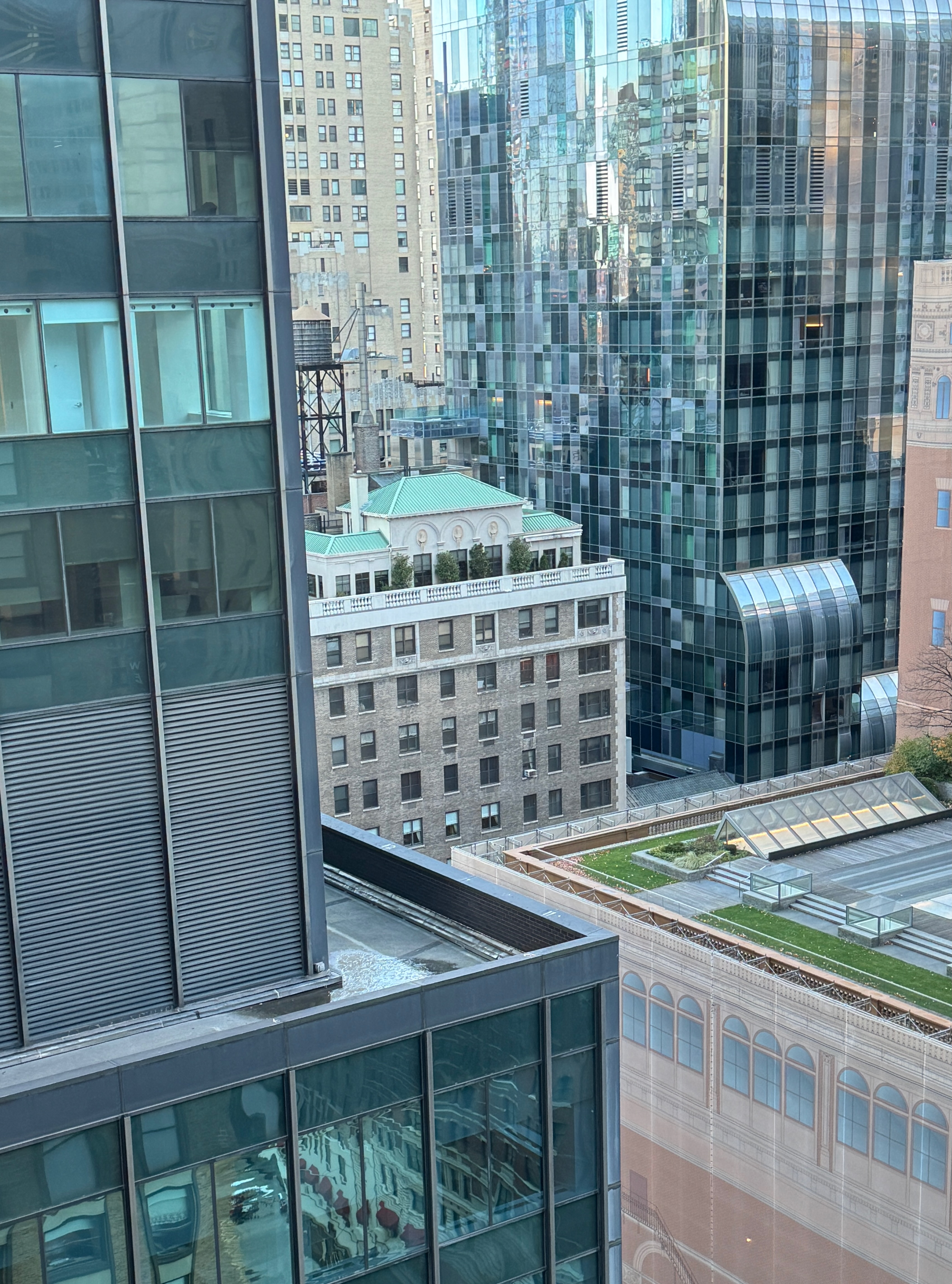
The Briarcliffe penthouse apartment, viewed from The Manhattan Club, one block to the southwest, on 56th Street

In October 1923, Eagle moved to The Briarcliffe, at 171 West 57th Street in Midtown Manhattan, from the Rodin Studios diagonally across Seventh Avenue and 57th Street. He lived in Philadelphia before that. At the Briarcliffe, he built himself a 5,573-square-foot penthouse apartment, with a 1,847-square-foot terrace that wraps around the southwestern corner of the building.

During its construction in 1921, and at a cost of $8,000, Eagle had extra steel beams included in the terrace's construction to support extensive garden plantings. "My wife and I have always loved the country and growing things, flowers and birds. Why should we have to leave town in search of the things that made us happy?" As such, the terrace featured flower beds, Japanese pines, a fountain with speckled trout, birdhouses and pheasants and squirrels.

== Death ==
Eagle's second wife, Tecla, suffered a nervous breakdown during their time at the Briarcliffe. On the morning of September 2, 1928, 51-year-old Eagle, who had been battling a three-week attack of insomnia, committed suicide in the gymnasium of the apartment. He used one of his hunting weapons, a "double-barreled rifle of .44 calibre, surmounted by a barrel of .22 calibre", shooting himself in the right temple. His body was found by his wife's nurse. He had sold the property one month earlier. When his will was probated, his estate had been hit by the Wall Street crash of 1929, for what was once worth $3.9 million was now worth $141,000. At the time of his death, he owed $3 million to Chase Bank, due in two months.
