= Hasegawa school =

Japanese painting style, mid-16th to early 18th century

Left panel of the Pine Trees screen (松林図 屏風, Shōrin-zu byōbu) by Hasegawa Tōhaku; Tokyo National Museum.

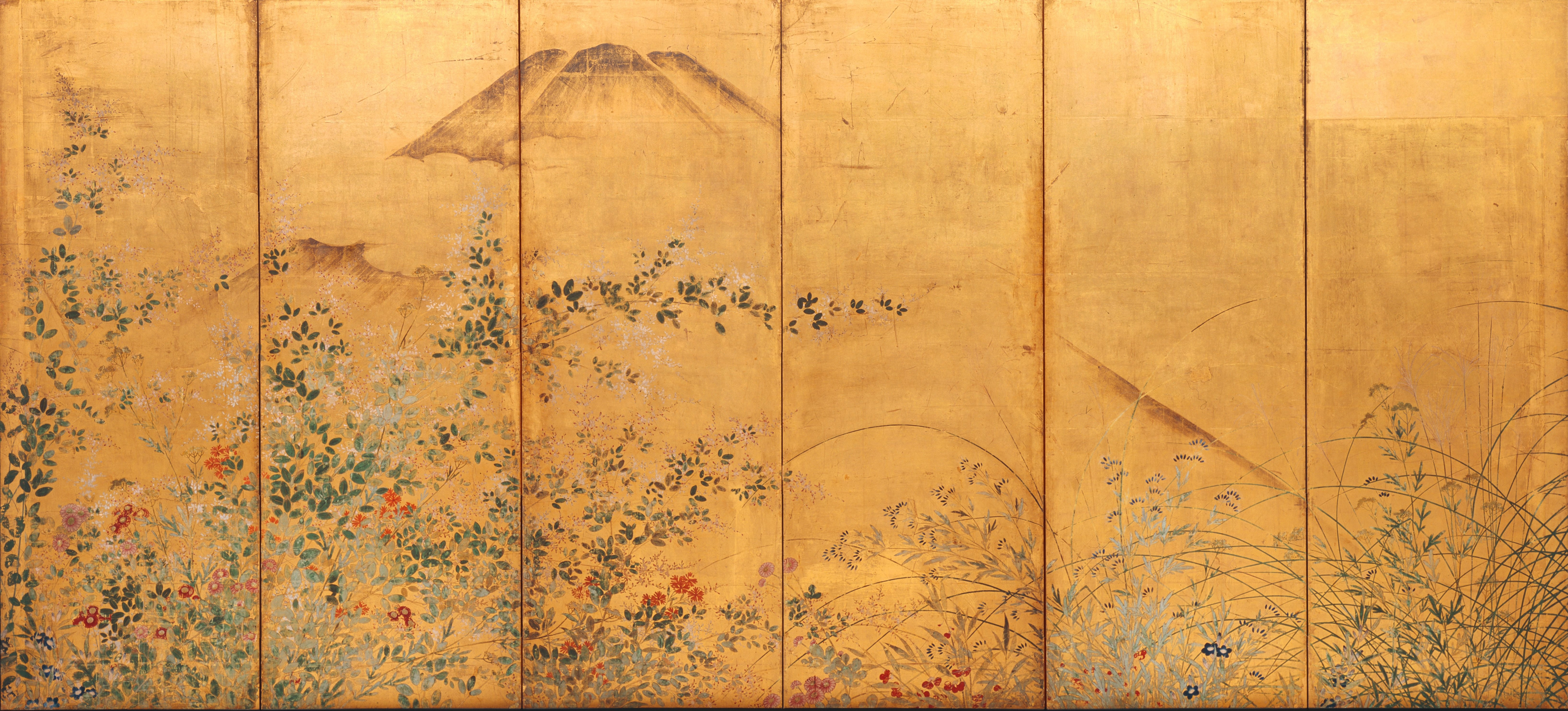
"Screen depicting Musashino Plains". Uncited, probably Hasegawa Togaku or Hasegawa Tohaku together with Hasegawa Kyuzo. Early Edo period (16-17th century)

The Hasegawa school (長谷川派, -ha) was a school (style) of Japanese painting founded in the 16th century by Hasegawa Tōhaku and disappeared around the beginning of the 18th century.

The school painted mostly fusuma (sliding doors), was based largely on the style of the Kanō school, and was centered in Kyoto. A relatively small school, the majority of its painters were students of Tōhaku and of various Kanō masters. Tōhaku himself was a student of Kanō Eitoku and is said to have considered himself the stylistic successor to Sesshū. He painted largely in monochrome ink, in largely Chinese-inspired styles, and is particularly famous for his depictions of monkeys.

== Notable Hasegawa school artists ==
- Hasegawa Tōhaku (1539–1610)
- Hasegawa Kyūzō (1568–1593)
- Hasegawa Togaku (?-1623)
- Hasegawa Sōtaku (fl. c. 1650)
- Hasegawa Sakon (fl. c. 1650)
- Hasegawa Sōya (d. 1667)
- Hasegawa Yōshin (d. 1726)
