= The Celebrity Bulletin =

U.S. daily magazine

- The week of January 2, 1956, international edition of the Bulletin
- Categories: Celebrity
- Frequency: Daily
- Founder: Earl Blackwell and Ted Strong
- First issue: 1952 (73 years ago)
- Country: United States
- Website: https://www.celebrity-bulletin.co.uk/

The Celebrity Bulletin is a magazine which reports on people in the arts, business, education, politics, religion, science and sports. It was founded by society impresario Earl Blackwell (1909–1995) in 1952. Originally a weekday (New York) or thrice weekly (Paris, London, Hollywood and Rome) four-page magazine, it is now published bi-weekly. International versions, published weekly, are also available.

The magazine is published by Blackwell's Celebrity Service, which initially had offices in New York and Hollywood but later expanded to include London, Paris and Rome. Subscriptions to Celebrity Service cost $12.50 a month, for which the customer receives daily bulletins on celebrity movements. Alternatively, they can phone at any time for "special inside information". The bulletin is now available via the Celebrity Service website.

The magazine's longtime editor, Bill Murray, died in his office of an apparent heart attack on March 2, 2010.
