= Kiyomizu-dera =

Buddhist temple in Kyoto, Japan

- 清水寺
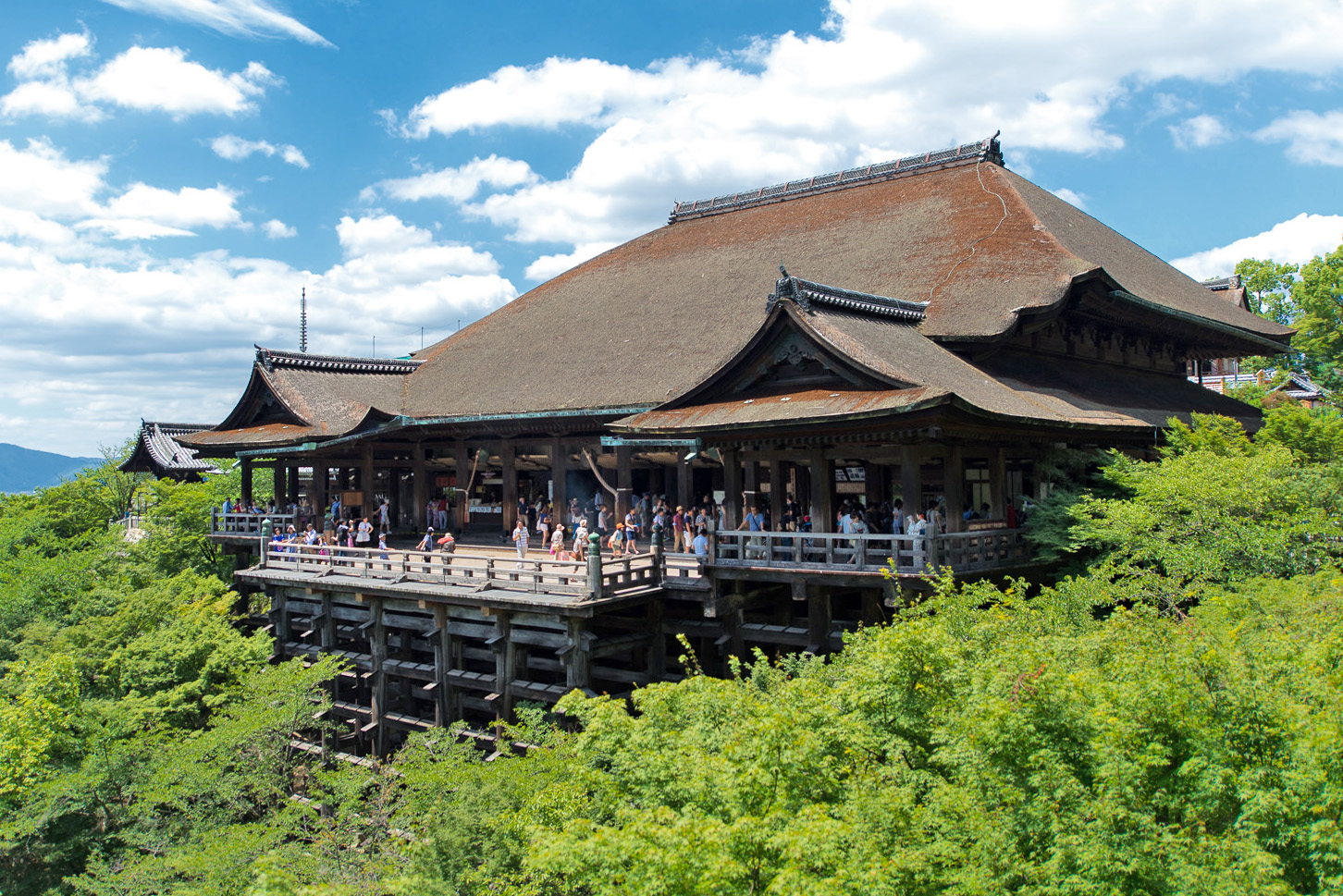
- Kiyomizu-dera's main hall (hondō)

- Location within Kyoto city Location within Japan

Religion
- Affiliation: Buddhism
- Sect: Kita-Hossō
- Deity: Kannon

Location
- Location: Higashiyama-ku, Kyoto
- Country: Japan
- Coordinates: 34°59′42″N 135°47′06″E

Architecture
- Founder: Sakanoue no Tamuramaro
- Established: 778
- UNESCO World Heritage Site
- Type: Cultural
- Criteria: ii, iv
- Designated: 1994
- Reference no.: 688

Website
- kiyomizudera.or.jp/en

Kiyomizu-dera (Japanese: 清水寺; lit. 'Pure Water Monastery') is a Buddhist temple located in eastern Kyoto, Japan. It belongs to the Kita-Hosso sect of Japanese Buddhism and its honzon is a hibutsu statue of Jūichimen Kannon. The temple's full name is Otowa-san Kiyomizu-dera (音羽山 清水寺). The temple is the 16th stop on the Saigoku Kannon Pilgrimage route. Along with Kōryū-ji and Kurama-dera, it is one of the few temples in Kyoto that predates the foundation of the capital to Heian-kyō. It is also one of Japan's leading temples dedicated to the worship of Kannon, along with Ishiyama-dera (Ōtsu, Shiga) and Hase-dera (Sakurai, Nara). It is a famous tourist destination in Kyoto City, attracting many pilgrims throughout the year. Since 1995, it holds the Kanji of the Year ceremony on 12 December (Kanji Day) every year. The temple is part of the Historic Monuments of Ancient Kyoto UNESCO World Heritage Site.

== History ==
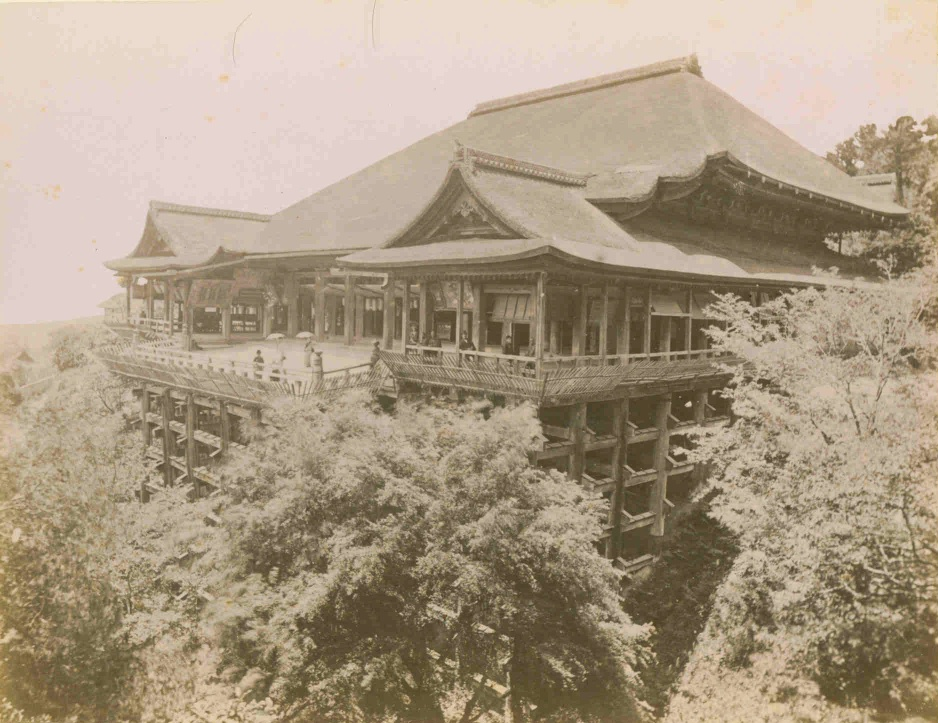
Kiyomizu-dera circa 1880 by Adolfo Farsari

The origins of Kiyomizu-dera are shrouded in legend, with a sparsity of verifiable historical documentation. The legend of the founding of Kiyomizu-dera, is found in the Kiyomizu-dera Engi compiled by Fujiwara no Akihira and included in the Gunsho Ruijū (Collection of Classical Japanese Writings), the Kiyomizu-dera Engi Emaki (produced in 1520), the Konjaku Monogatarishū (Tales of Times Now Past and Present), and the Fusō Ryakuki (Records of the Buddhist Literature) contain legends about the temple's founding. According to these sources, the founding legend is roughly as follows:

In 778, Kenshin (later renamed Enchin), a monk of Kofuku-ji in Yamato Province and training at Kojima-dera (present-day Takatori, Nara), received a message in a dream that led him north to Mount Otowa, the site of Kiyomizu-dera in the Higashiyama area of Yasaka-go, Atago District, Yamashiro Province. When Kenshin discovered a golden stream, he traced its source and found a white-robed ascetic named Gyōei Koji, who had retreated to the mountain, practicing ascetic practices under the waterfall and praying to the Senjū Kannon (Sahasrabhuja). Gyōei Koji, who was 200 years old, told Kenshin, "I have waited many years for you to come. I am now leaving for the eastern provinces, so I leave the rest to you." He then left. Realizing that Gyōei was an incarnation of Kannon, Kenshin carved a statue of the Senjū Kannon from the sacred tree Gyōei had left behind and enshrined it in Gyōei's former hermitage. This is said to be the beginning of the temple. The waterfall where Gyōei Koji practiced ascetic practices later came to be called Otowa Falls, which is still on the grounds of Kiyomizu-dera. Two years later, in 780, Sakanoue no Tamuramaro (758–811), who had entered Mount Otowa to hunt a deer, encountered Kenshin. Tamuramaro had come to the mountain in search of deer blood for medicinal purposes to help his wife, Takako, recover from her illness. However, after being persuaded by Enchin of the sins of killing, he converted to faith in Kannon, donating his own house as the main hall to house the statue and naming the temple Kiyomizu-dera. Kiyomizu means "pure water". Later, when he was appointed Shogun and ordered to pacify the Emishi in the eastern provinces, Tamuramaro is said to have visited Kiyomizu-dera, to pray for victory. Later, with the help of a young warrior and an elderly monk (incarnations of Bishamon-ten, the messenger of Kannon, and Jizō Bosatsu), he won the battles and returned safely to the capital. In 798, Tamuramaro, working with Enchin, extensively renovated the main hall and created statues of Bishamon-ten and Jizō as attendants to the Kannon statue, enshrining them together. Based on these legends, Kiyomizu-dera regards Gyōei as its founder, Enchin as its founding priest, and Tamuramaro as its principal patron.

In 805, Sakanoue no Tamuramaro was granted land for the temple by the Grand Council of State. In 810, the temple was officially recognized by Emperor Saga, and given the name "Kita Kannon-ji." The Pillow Book cites the festival at Kiyomizu Kannon as an example of a "noisy thing," and references to Kiyomizu Kannon in the "Yugao" chapter of Genji Monogatari and the Konjaku Monogatarishū, indicate that it was a well-known Kannon shrine in the mid-Heian period.

The Kiyomizu-dera complex has burned down nine times, recorded since the fire of 1063 (mentioned in the Fusō Ryakuki) until its destruction in 1629 in the early modern period.

Since the Heian period, it had long been under the control of the Hosso sect of Buddhism, Kofuku-ji, and from the mid-Heian period it also held Shingon Buddhism. However, it was frequently caught up in the conflict between Kofuku-ji and Enryaku-ji, and was burned down in 1165 by an incursion by Enryaku-ji warrior monks. In 1469, the temple was destroyed by fire during the Ōnin War. The Ji sect's fundraiser, Gan'ami, was brought in to rebuild it. Prior to joining Kiyomizu-dera, Gan'ami had been involved in projects such as rebuilding bridges and temple buildings and providing public relief. He used fundraisers and connections he had made with important figures to lead the reconstruction project. The temple was granted a 130 koku estate for its upkeep by Toyotomi Hideyoshi. The current main hall was rebuilt in 1633 after a fire in 1629 with a donation from Tokugawa Iemitsu. Many of the other buildings were rebuilt around this time. In the early Meiji era, the temple changed its sect to the Shingon-shū Daigoji-ha school, but reverted to Hosso sect in 1885.

In 1914, Ōnishi Ryokei, the head priest of Kofuku-ji and head of the Hosso sect, became the chief priest of Kiyomizu-dera. Ōnishi separated from the Hosso sect in 1965 and founded the Kita-Hosso sect, becoming its first abbot. He served as the chief priest of Kiyomizu-dera for nearly 70 years until his death in 1983 at the age of 107, and is considered the "founder of its revival." In 1966, Ōnishi began holding bi-monthly Kita-Hosso Buddhist culture lectures, and in 1974, he founded the Japan-China Friendship Buddhist Association, contributing to international exchange, peace movements, and cultural activities through Buddhism.

=== Present ===
The expression "to jump off the stage at Kiyomizu" is the Japanese equivalent of the English expression "to take the plunge". This refers to an Edo-period tradition that held that if one survived a 13-meter (43-foot) jump from the stage, one's wish would be granted. During the Edo period, 234 jumps were recorded, and of the jumpers, 85.4 per cent survived. The practice was prohibited in 1872.

The temple complex includes several other shrines, among them the Jishu Shrine, dedicated to Ōkuninushi, a god of love and "good matches". Jishu Shrine possesses a pair of "love stones" placed 10 meters (30 feet) apart, which lonely visitors can try to walk between with their eyes closed. Success in reaching the other stone with their eyes closed implies that the pilgrim will find true love.

The complex also offers various talismans, incense, and omikuji (paper fortunes). The site is particularly popular during festivals, especially at New Year's and during obon in the summer, when additional booths fill the grounds selling traditional holiday foodstuffs and souvenirs.

In 2007, Kiyomizu-dera was one of 21 finalists for the New Seven Wonders of the World, but was not picked as one of the seven winning sites. The temple was covered entirely by semi-transparent scaffolding while it underwent restoration works in preparation for the 2020 Olympics.

== Architecture ==
Kiyomizu-dera is located in the foothills of Mount Otowa, part of the Higashiyama mountain range that dominates eastern Kyoto. The main hall has a large veranda, supported by tall pillars using ''kakezukuri'', that juts out over the hillside and offers views of the city. There is not a single nail used in the entire structure. Large verandas and main halls were constructed at many popular sites during the Edo period to accommodate large numbers of pilgrims.

Beneath the main hall is the Otowa waterfall, where three channels of water fall into a pond. Visitors can catch and drink the water, which is believed to have wish-granting powers. There is also the Tainai Meguri, a dark tunnel said to represent the womb of Daizuiku Bosatsu (the bodhisattva Mahāpratisarā).

== Gallery ==
Kiyomizu-dera in autumn

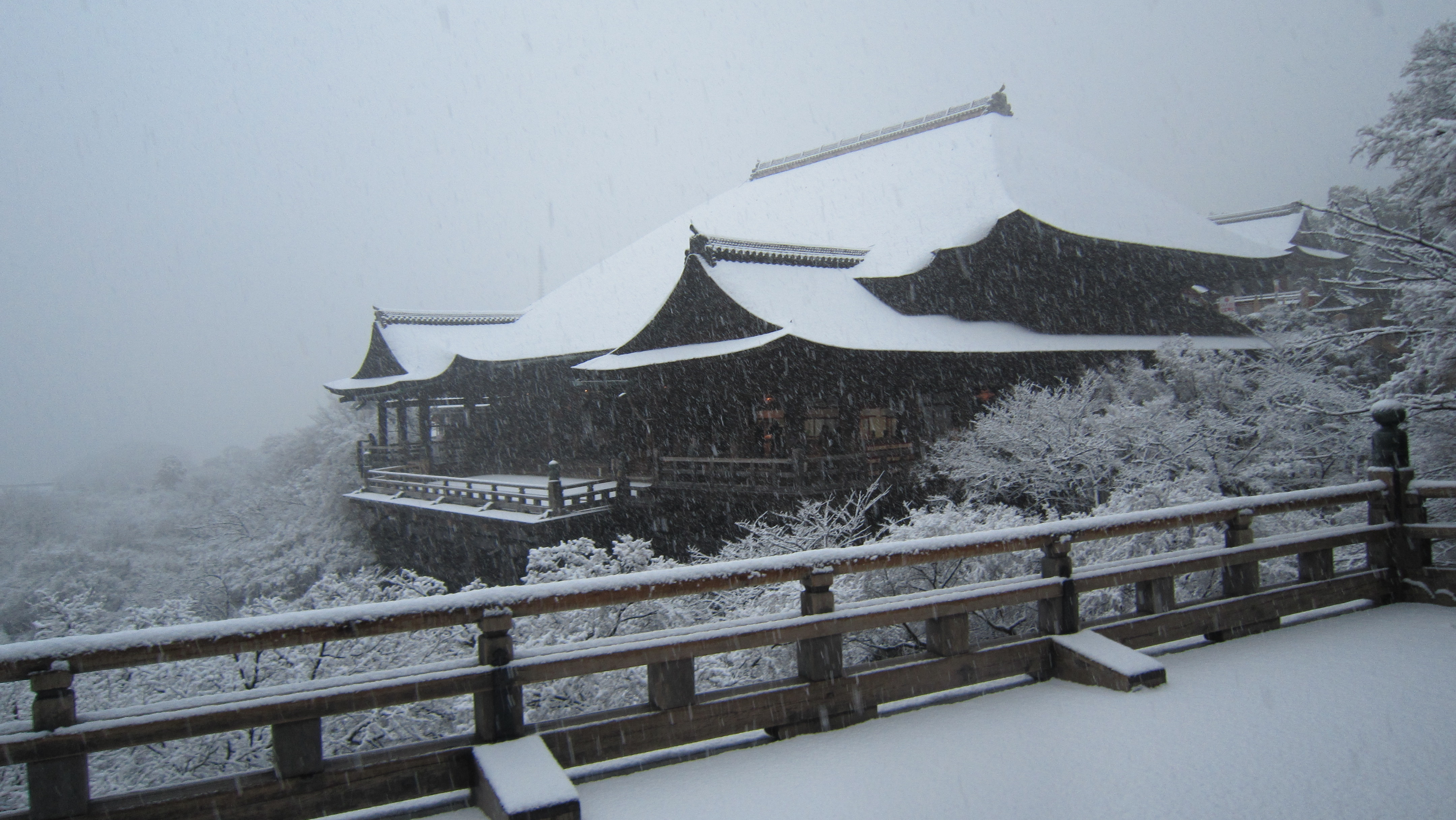
Kiyomizu-dera in winter

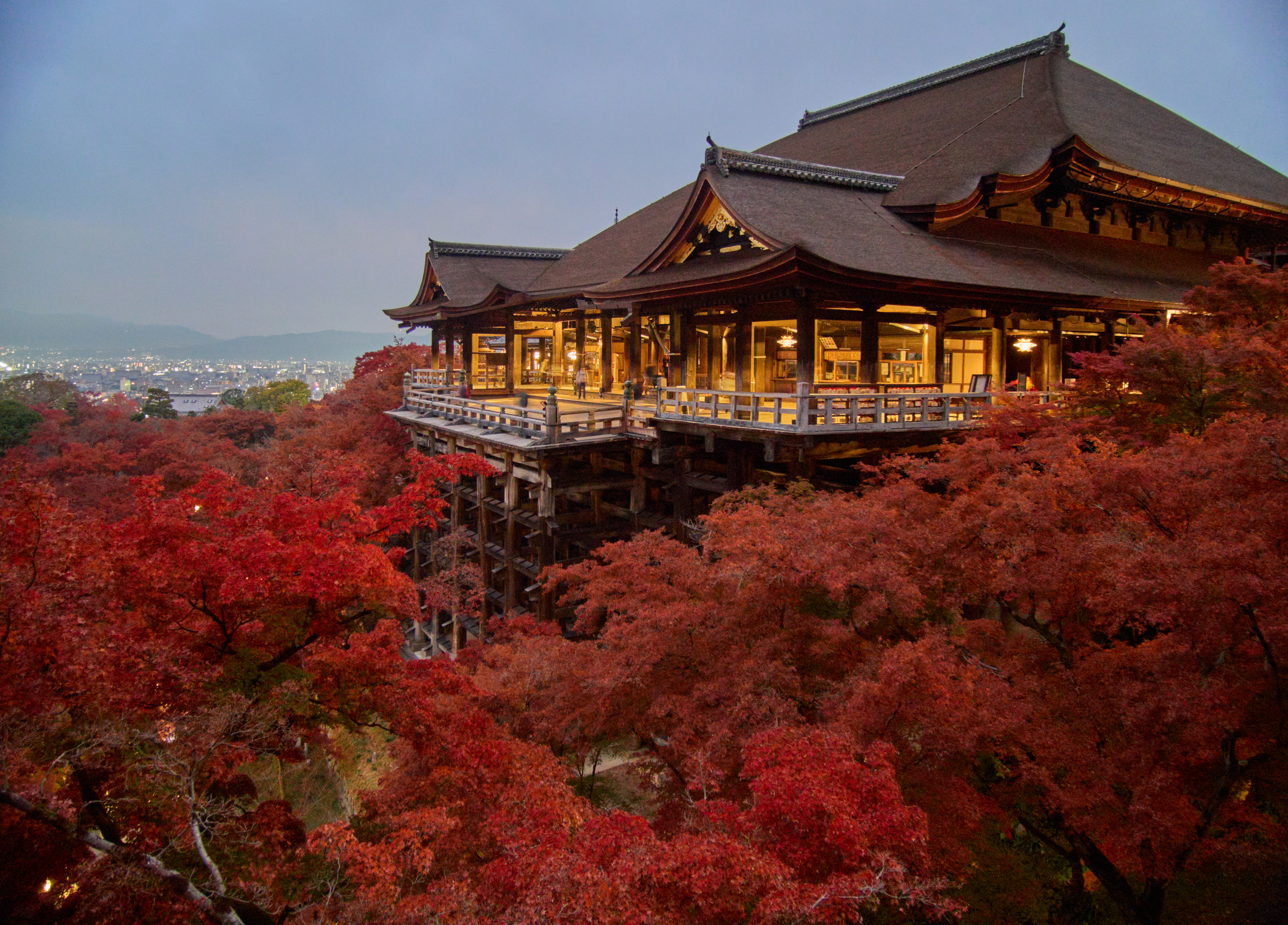
Kiyomizu-dera on an early morning in autumn

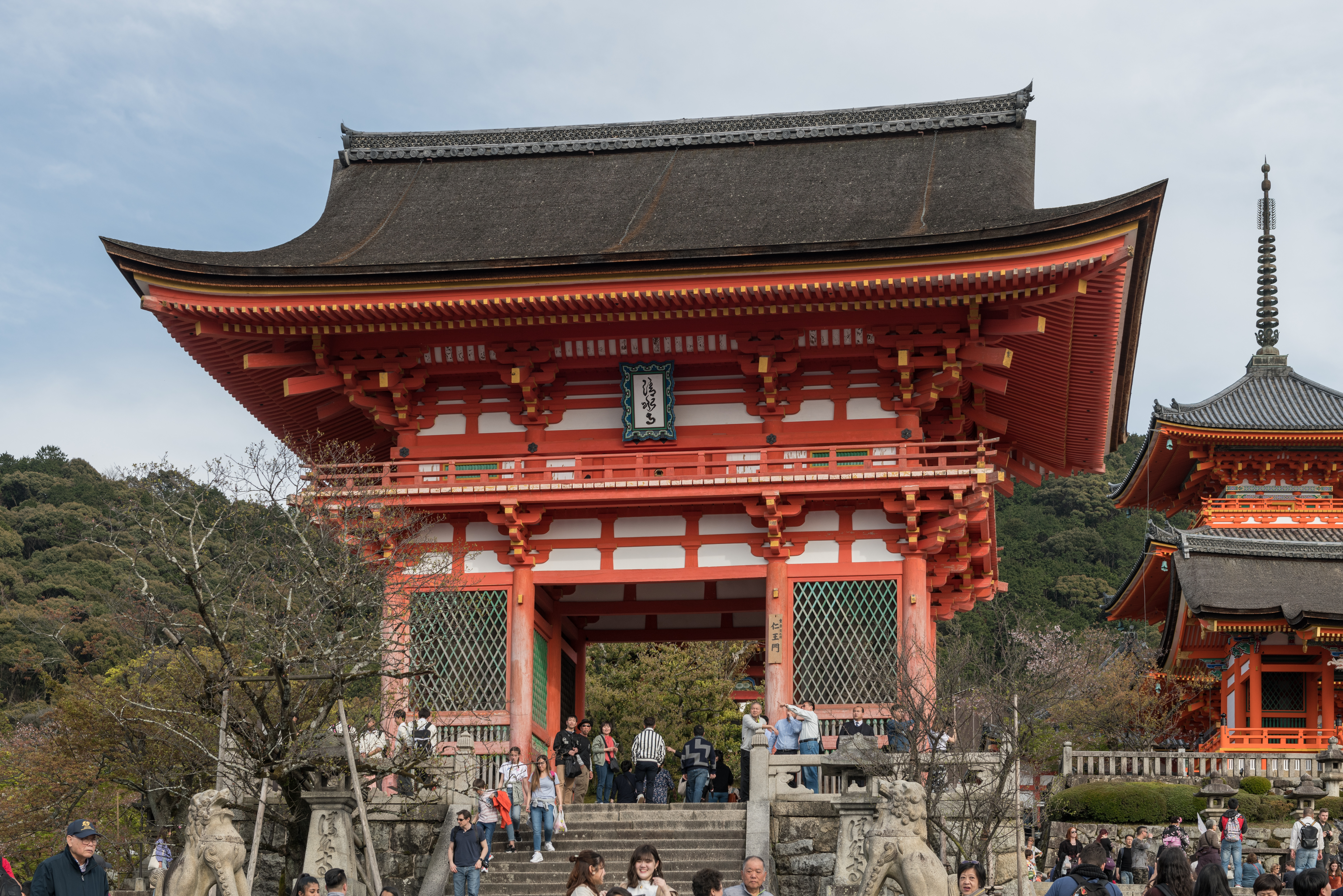
Niōmon (deva gate)

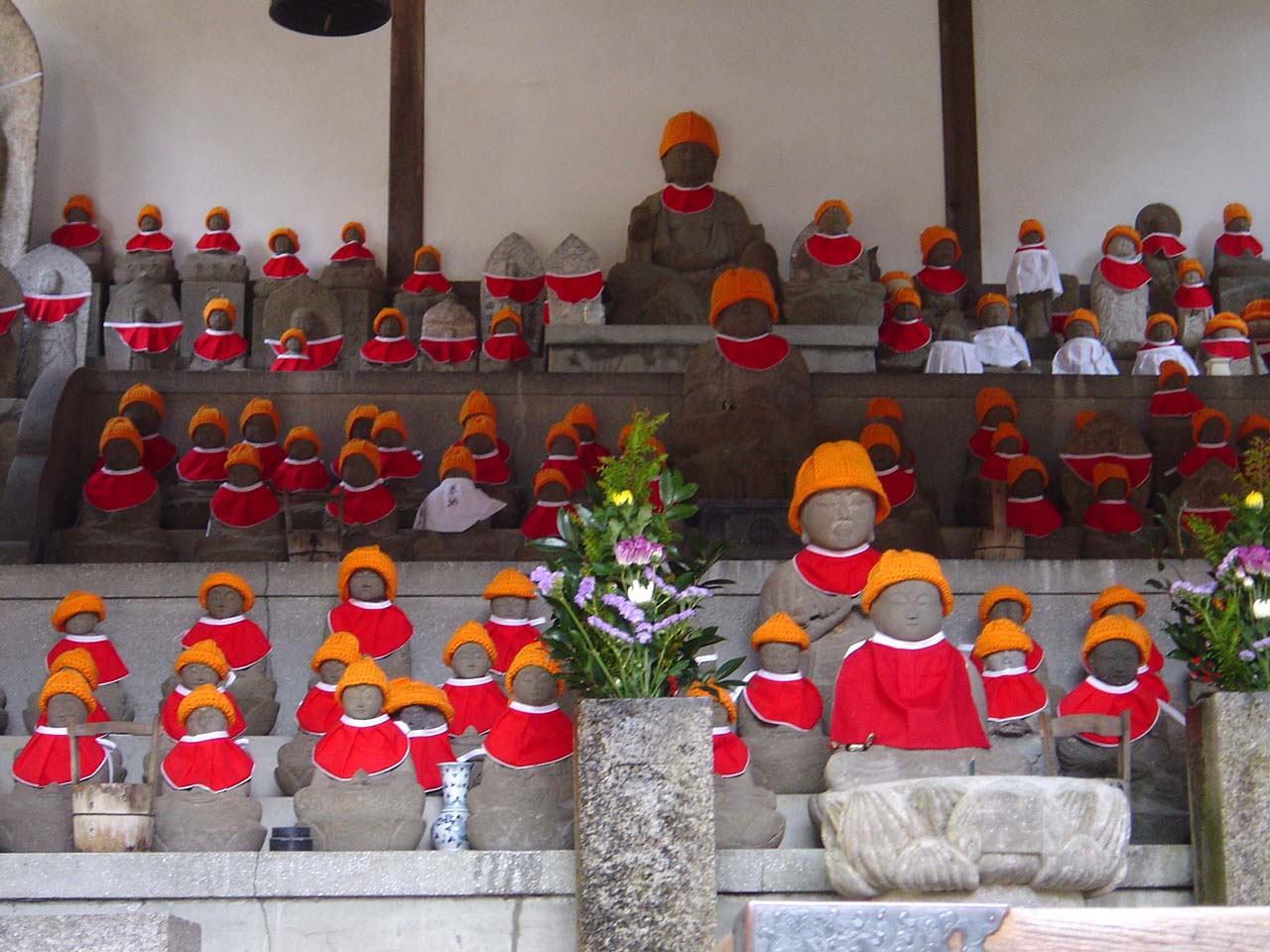
Statuettes of Jizō Bosatsu) en masse

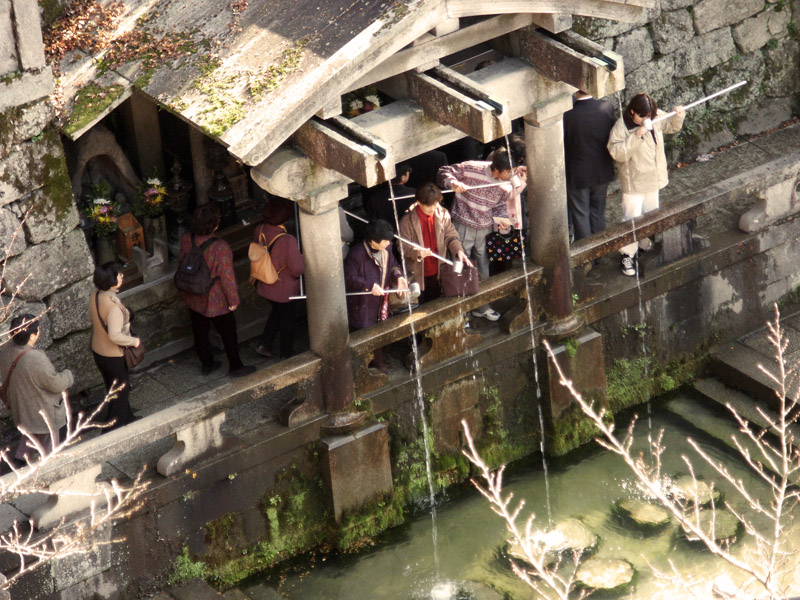
Otowa-no-taki, the waterfall where visitors drink for health, longevity, and success in studies

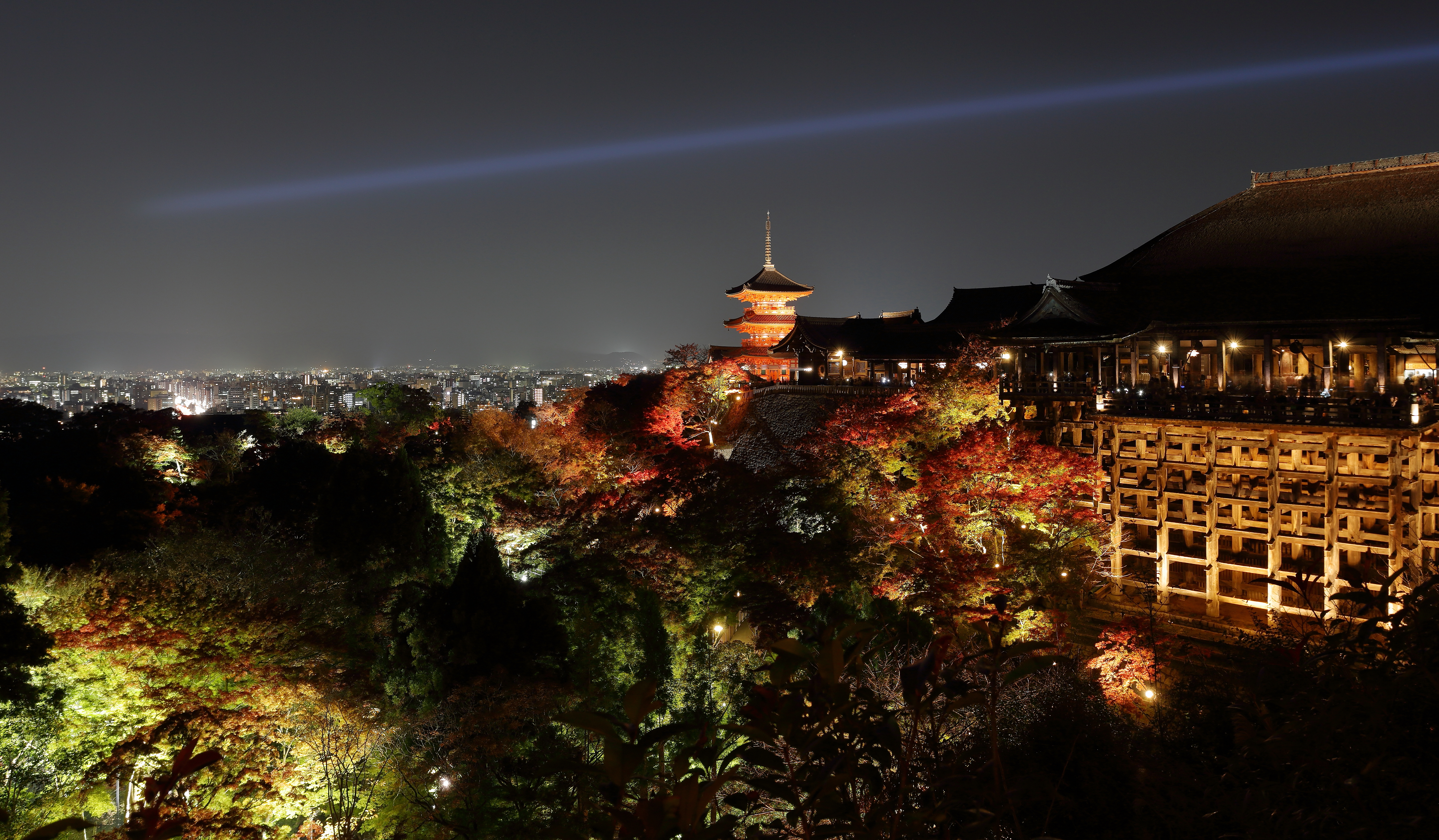
Kiyomizu-dera, Illuminated

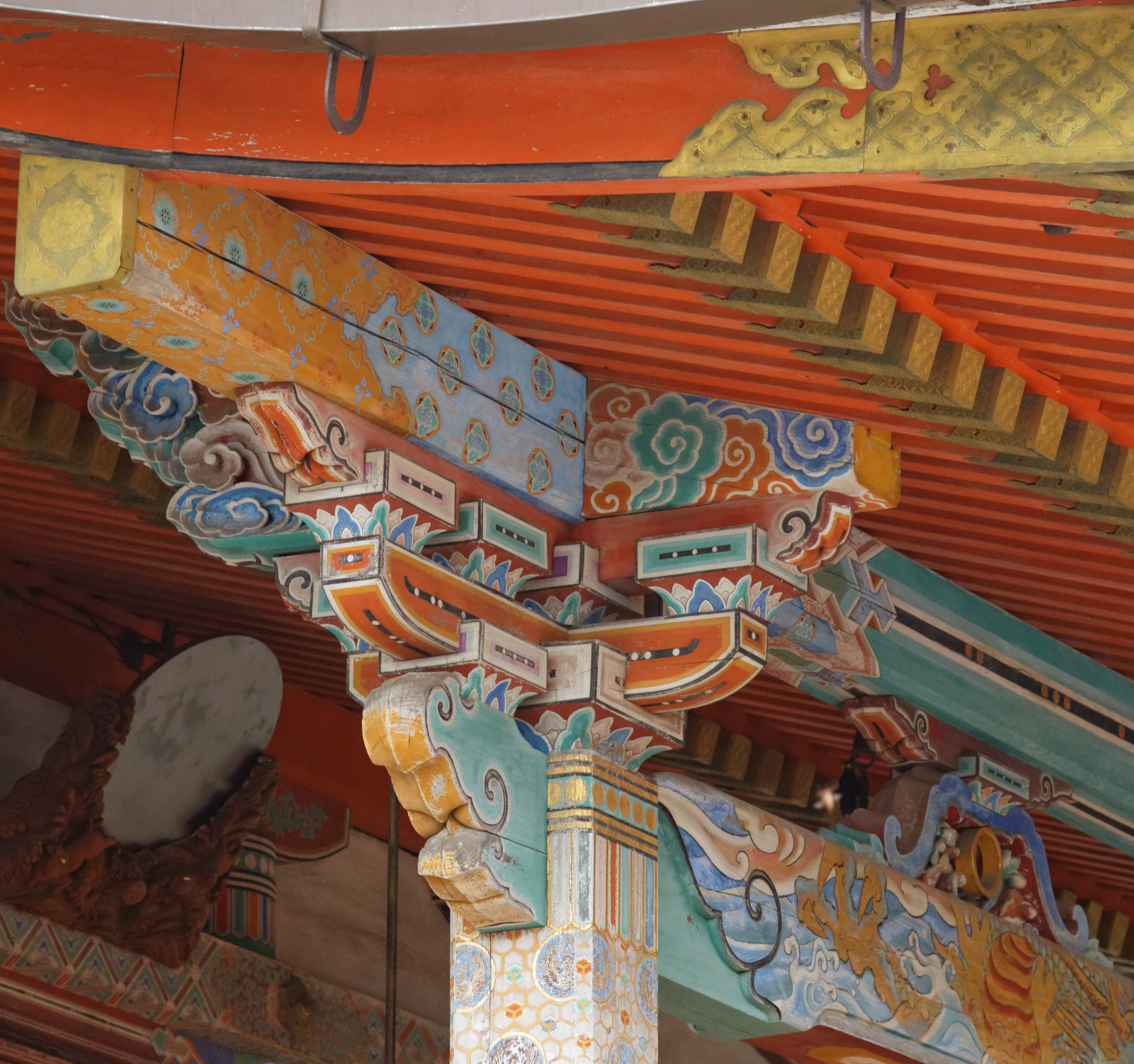
Dougong architectural element, Kiyomizu-dera

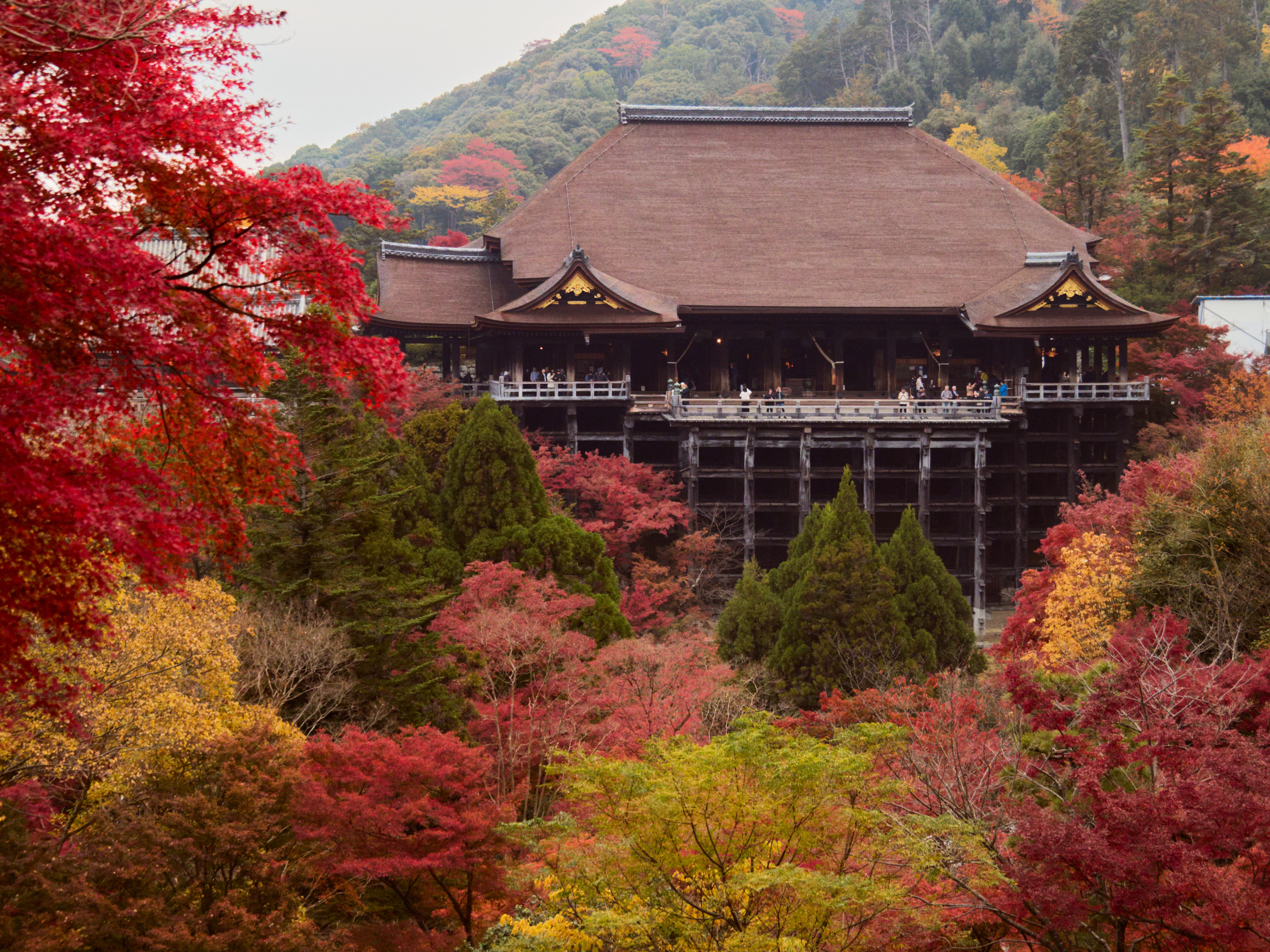
Kiyomizu-dera in autumn

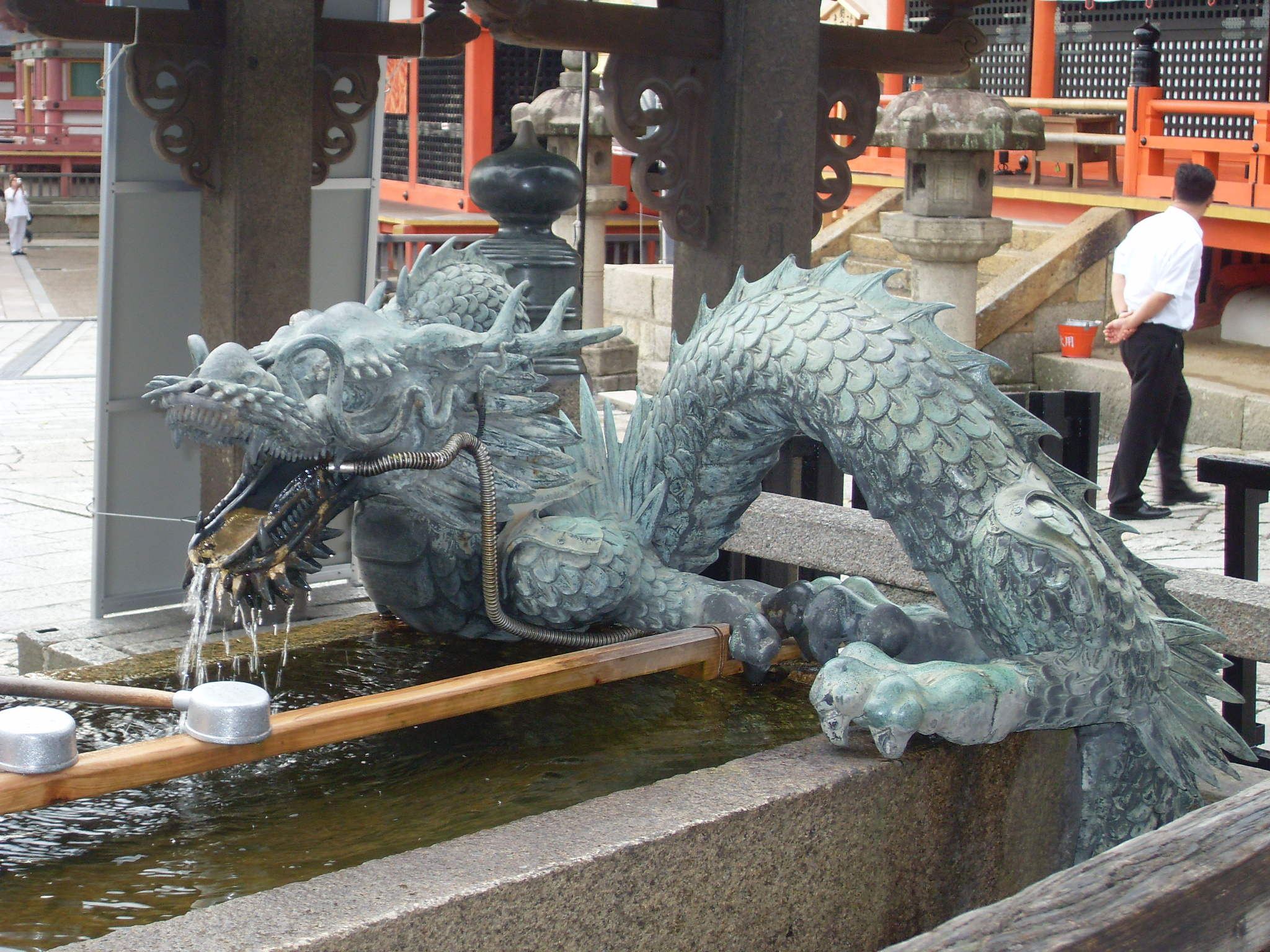
Dragon sculpture at Kiyomizu-dera

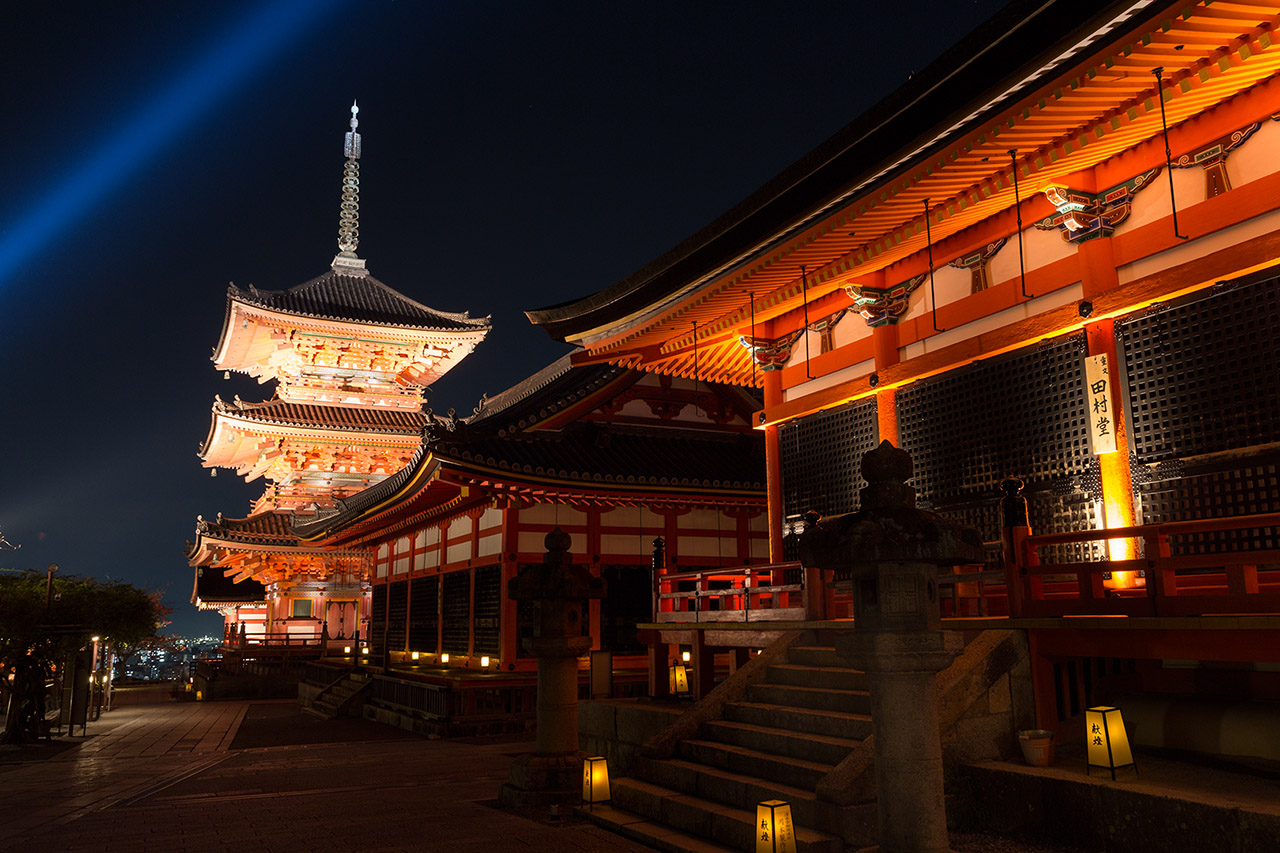
Right to left: Kaisan-dō (Founder's Hall), Kyōdō (Sutra Hall) and Sanjū-no-tō (Three storied Pagoda)

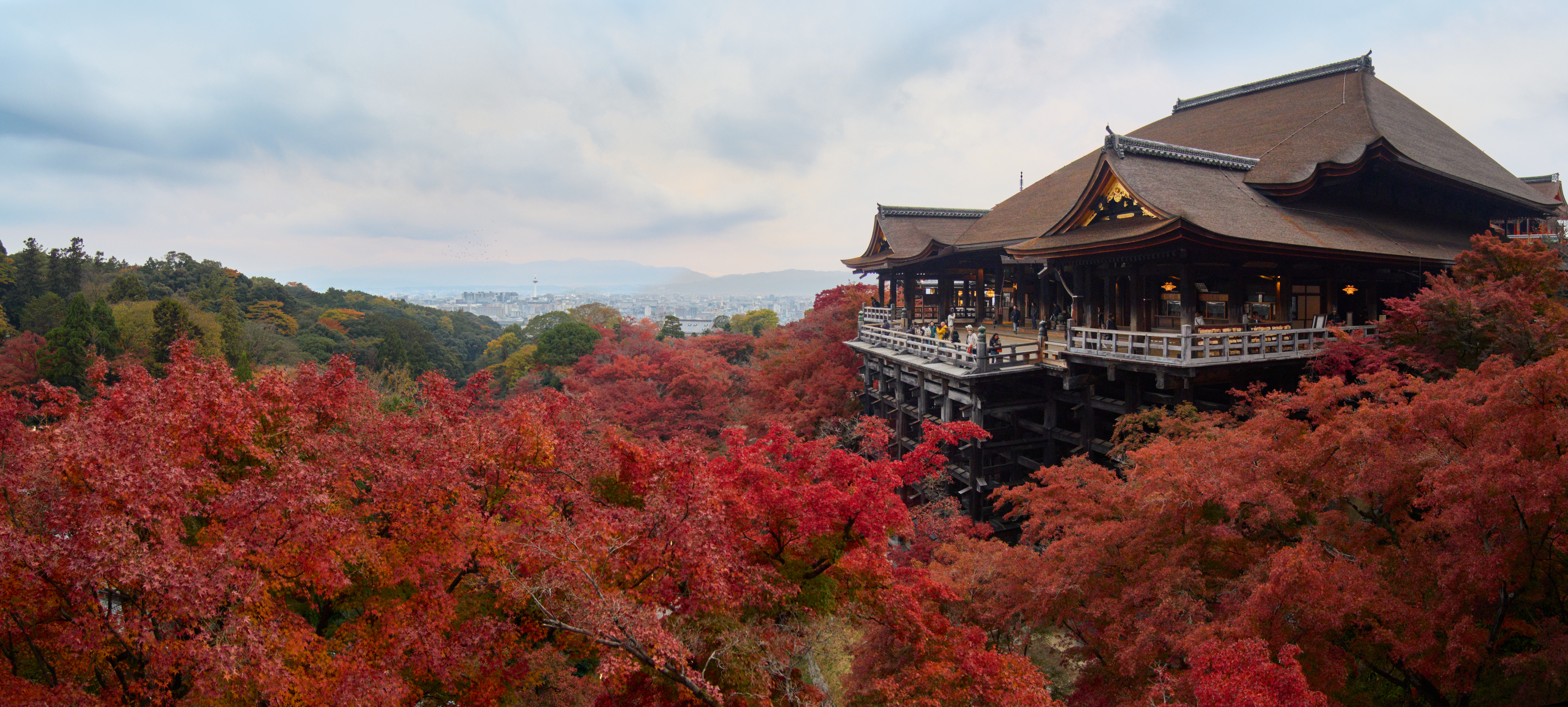
Panorama of Kiyomizu-dera complex in autumn

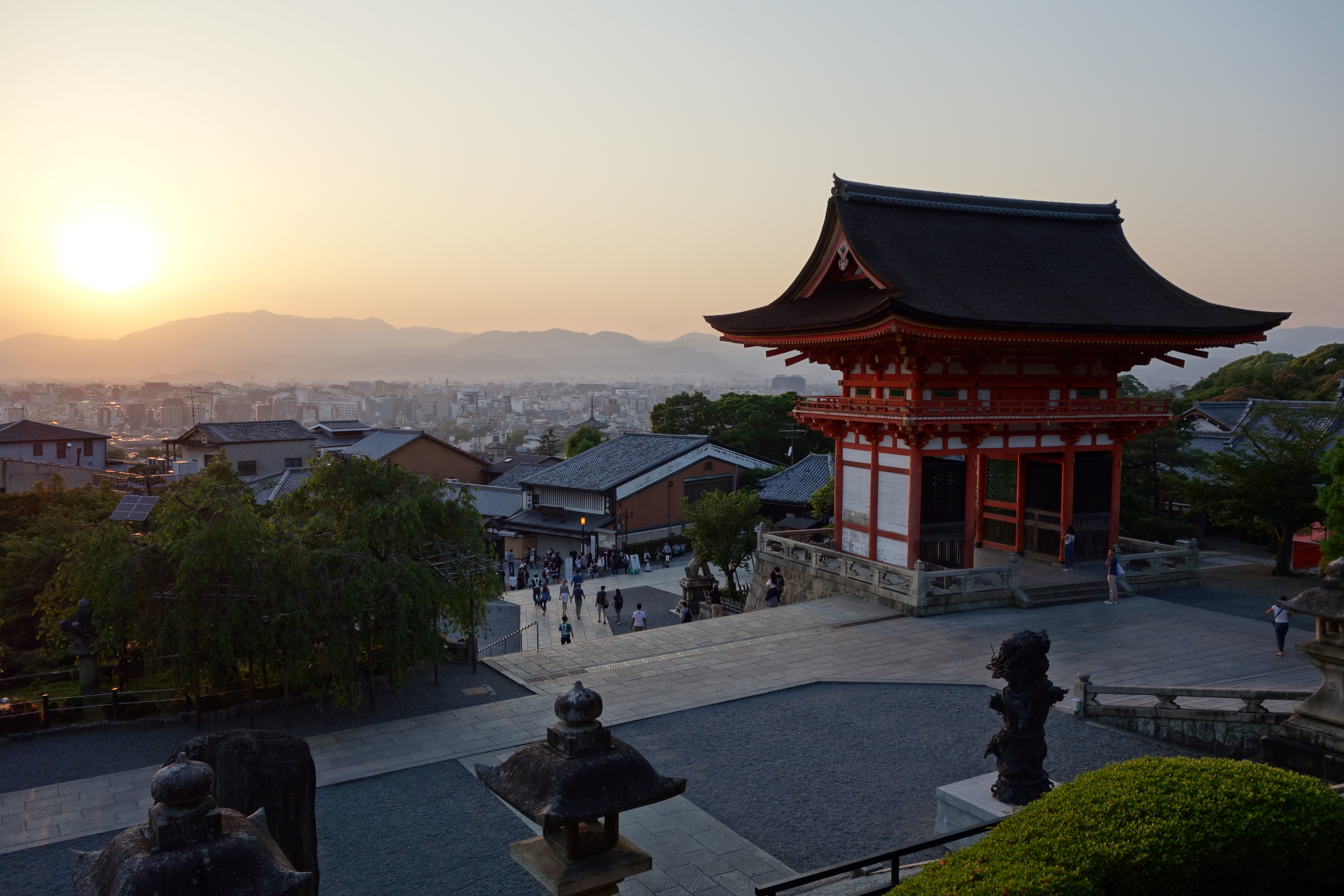
View of Kyoto and Niōmon from Kiyomizu-dera

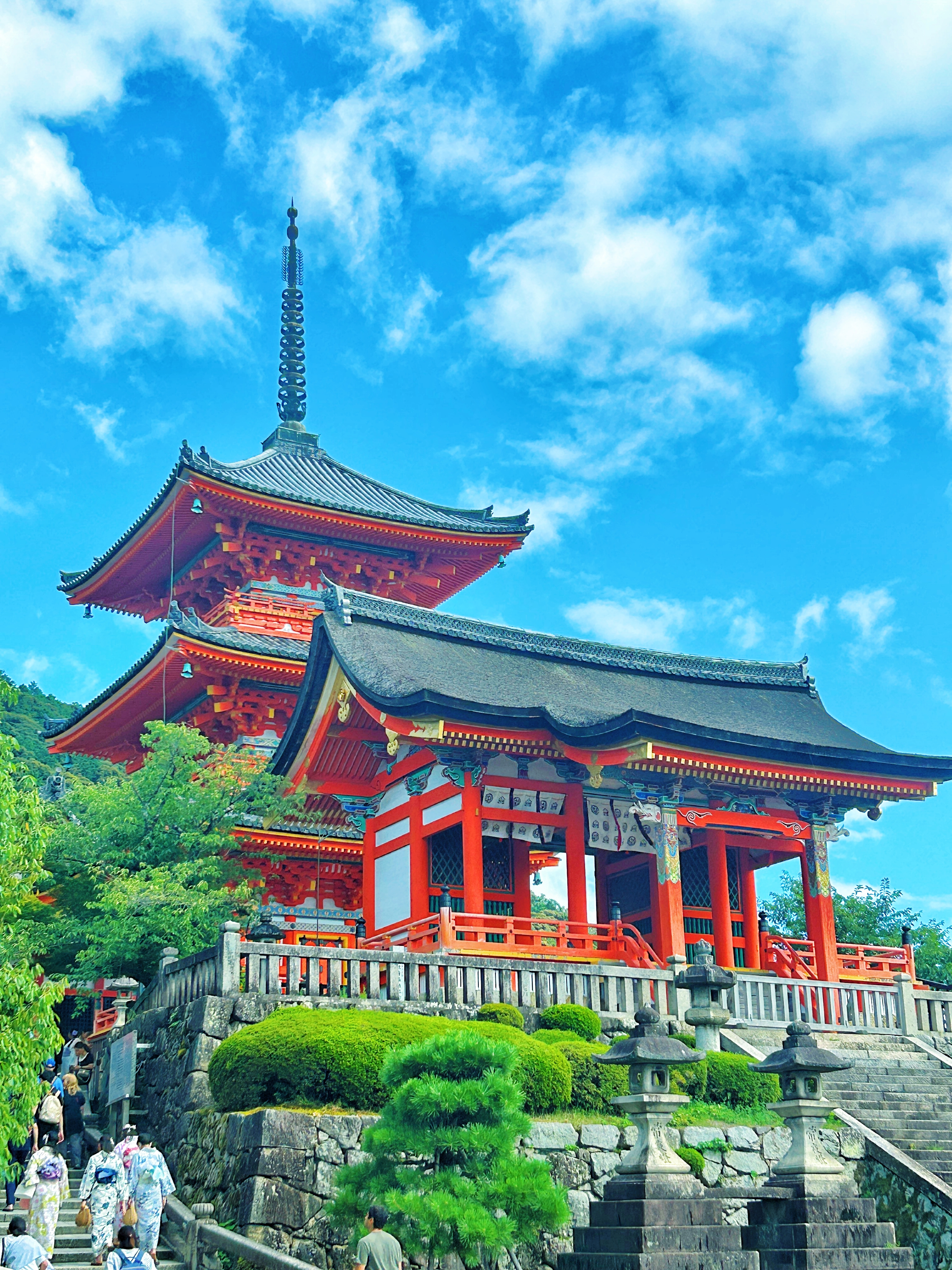
Kiyomizu-dera

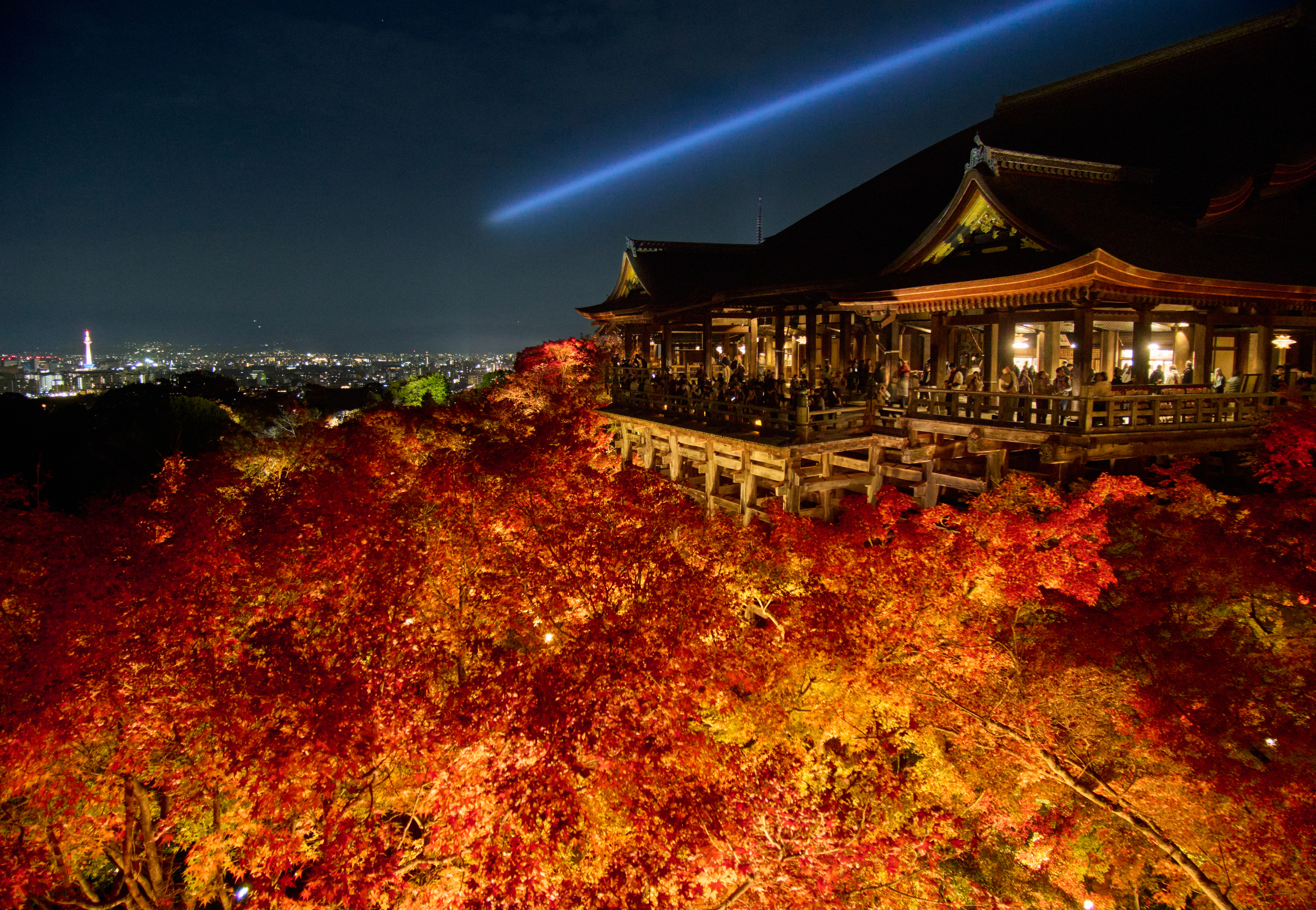
Special autumn illuminations in Kiyomizu-dera

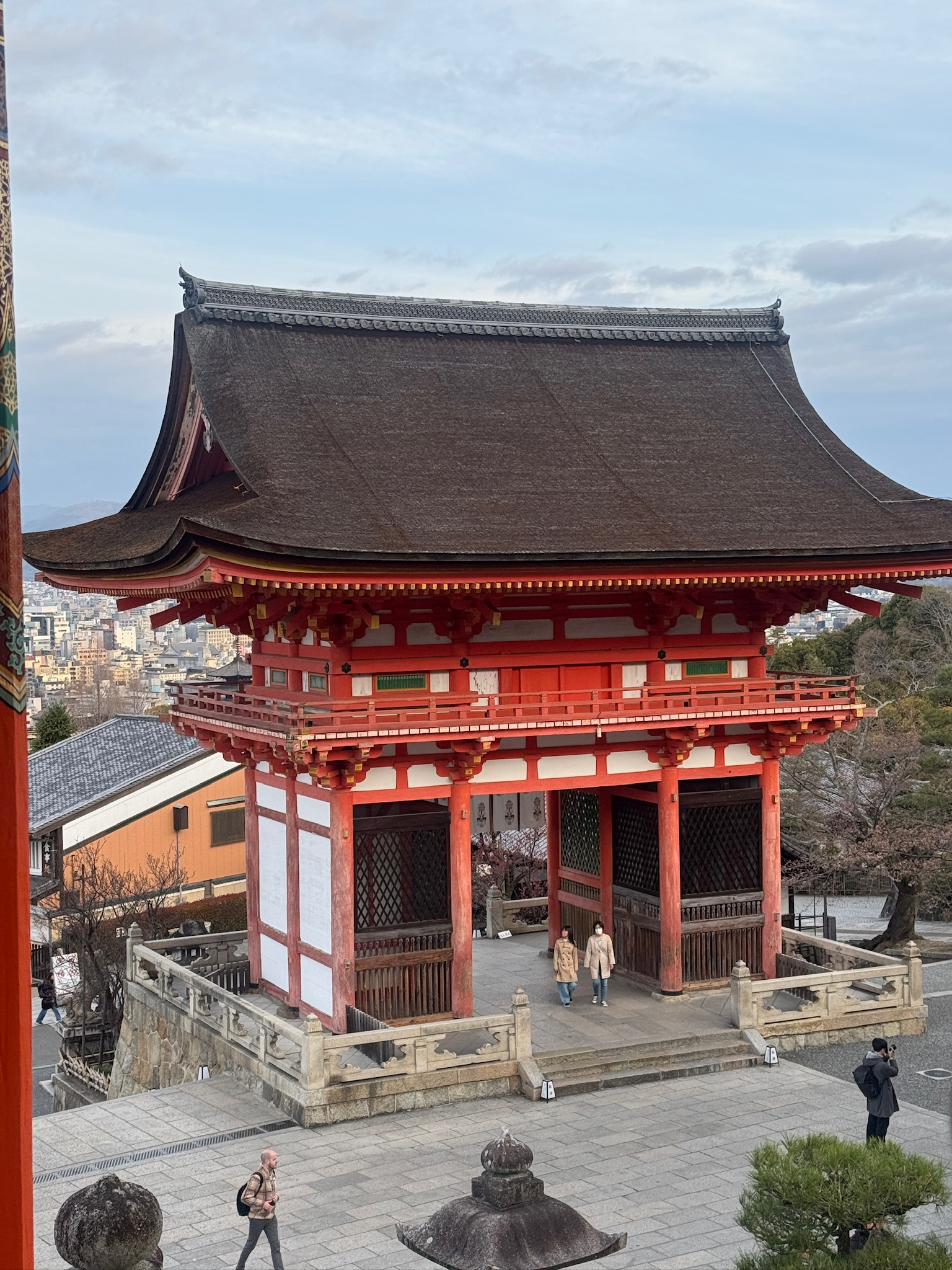
View of Kyoto from the temple

== Cultural Properties ==
=== National Treasures ===
- Hondō (本堂), Edo period (1633)

=== National Important Cultural Properties ===
==== Structures ====
At Kiyomizu-dera, 15 structures are collectively designated an Important Cultural Property.

- Niōmon (仁王門), Muromachi period (1467-1572)
- Umatodome stables (馬駐), Muromachi period (1467-1572)
- Nishimon (西門), Edo period (1631)
- Three-story Pagoda (三重塔), Edo period (1632)
- Shōrō (鐘楼), Edo period (1607)
- Kyōdō (経堂), Edo period (1624-1643)
- Tamura-dō (田村堂), Edo period (1624-1643)
- Asakura-dō (朝倉堂), Edo period (1624-1643)
- Chinjū-dō (Kasuga-sha) (鎮守堂（春日社）), Edo period (1624-1643)
- Honbō Kitasōmon (本坊北総門), Edo period (1624-1643)
- Todoroki-mon (轟門), Edo period (1624-1643)
- Shaka-dō (釈迦堂), Edo period (1631)
- Amida-dō (阿弥陀堂), Edo period (1624-1643)
- Oku-no-in (奥の院), Edo period (1633)
- Koyasu-tō (子安塔), Muromachi period (1467-1572)

==== Other ====
- Wooden statue of seated Kannon Bosatsu (木造千手観音坐像（奥院安置）), Kamakura period; honzon of the Oku-no-in
- Wooden statue of standing Kannon Bosatsu (木造十一面観音立像), Heian period; located in Hondō
- Wooden statue of standing Kannon Bosatsu (木造伝観音菩薩立像), Kamakura period; formerly located in Amida-dō, now at Kyoto National Museum
- Wooden statue of standing Seishi Bosatsu (木造伝勢至菩薩立像), Kamakura period; formerly located in Amida-dō, now at Kyoto National Museum
- Wooden statue of seated Dainichi Nyorai (木造大日如来坐像), Heian period; from former temple of Shinpuku-ji
- Wooden statue of standing Bishamon-ten (木造毘沙門天立像), Heian period; from sub-temple Jishin-in
- Tokaibune Ship Plaque (渡海船額), Edo period (1632–34); set of 3
- Painted and colored votive plaque "Asahina Kusazuri Hikizu" (絵著色朝比奈草摺曳図), Azuchi-Momoyama period; attributed to Hasegawa Kyūzō
- Iron waniguchi (鉄鰐口), Kamakura period (1236)
- Bonshō (鉄梵鐘), Muromachi period

=== National Places of Scenic Beauty ===
- Jōjū-in Gardens (成就院庭園),

=== Kyoto Prefecture Designated Tangible Cultural Property ===
- Kiyomizu-dera Pilgrimage Mandala (清水寺参詣曼荼羅), Muromachi period

== See also ==
- Historic Monuments of Ancient Kyoto (Kyoto, Uji and Otsu Cities)
- List of Buddhist temples in Kyoto
- List of National Treasures of Japan (temples)
- List of Places of Scenic Beauty of Japan (Kyoto)
- Tourism in Japan

== Sources ==
- Graham, Patricia J. (2007). Faith and Power in Japanese Buddhist Art. Honolulu: University of Hawaii Press. ISBN 978-0-8248-3126-4.
- Ponsonby-Fane, Richard Arthur Brabazon (1956). Kyoto: The Old Capital of Japan, 794-1869. Kyoto: The Ponsonby Memorial Society.
