= The Briarcliffe =

Residential building in Manhattan, New York

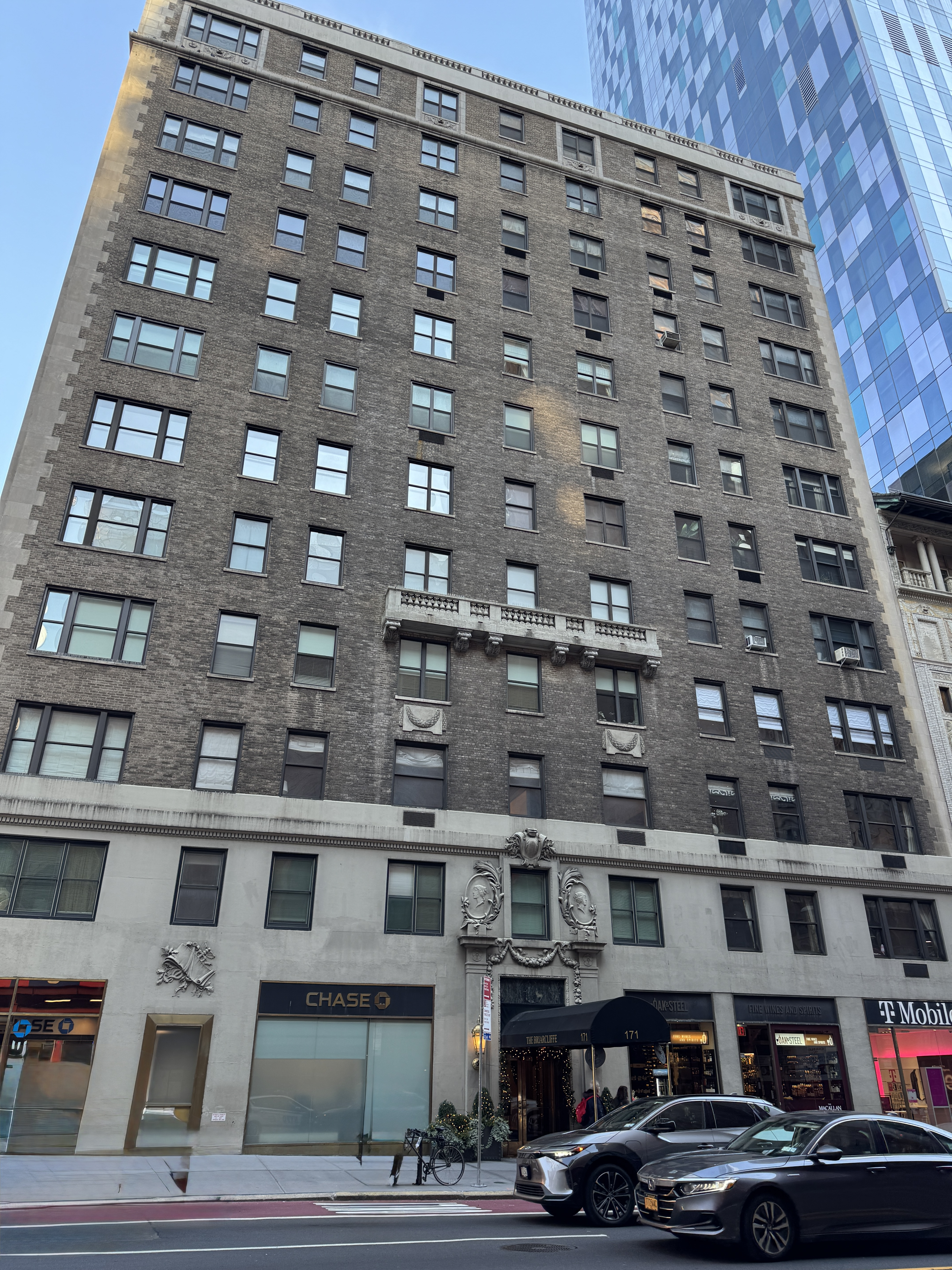
- The building in 2024

General information
- Type: Condominiums
- Location: 171 West 57th Street, Midtown Manhattan, New York City, New York, U.S.
- Coordinates: 40.7655614°N 73.9795838°W
- Completed: 1922 (104 years ago)

Technical details
- Floor count: 13

Design and construction
- Architect: Warren and Wetmore

The Briarcliffe is a 13-story, 35-unit residence at 171 West 57th Street, at the northeastern corner with Seventh Avenue, in Midtown Manhattan, New York City. Located just north of Carnegie Hall, the property was built as a hotel in 1922, designed by architects Warren and Wetmore, and converted to its current purpose as condominiums in 1999. The Briarcliffe is part of Billionaires' Row and shares a city block with the Alwyn Court to the north and 165 West 57th Street, One57, the Nippon Club Tower, the Calvary Baptist Church, and 111 West 57th Street to the east.

In 1998, the owner of the building hired architect Richard Rice to ready the deteriorating property to be placed on the market. The building's murals had been damaged by water, and Rice was prepared to restore them; however, the following year, the building was converted to a condominium, and the murals were destroyed in the reconstruction work.

== Penthouse ==
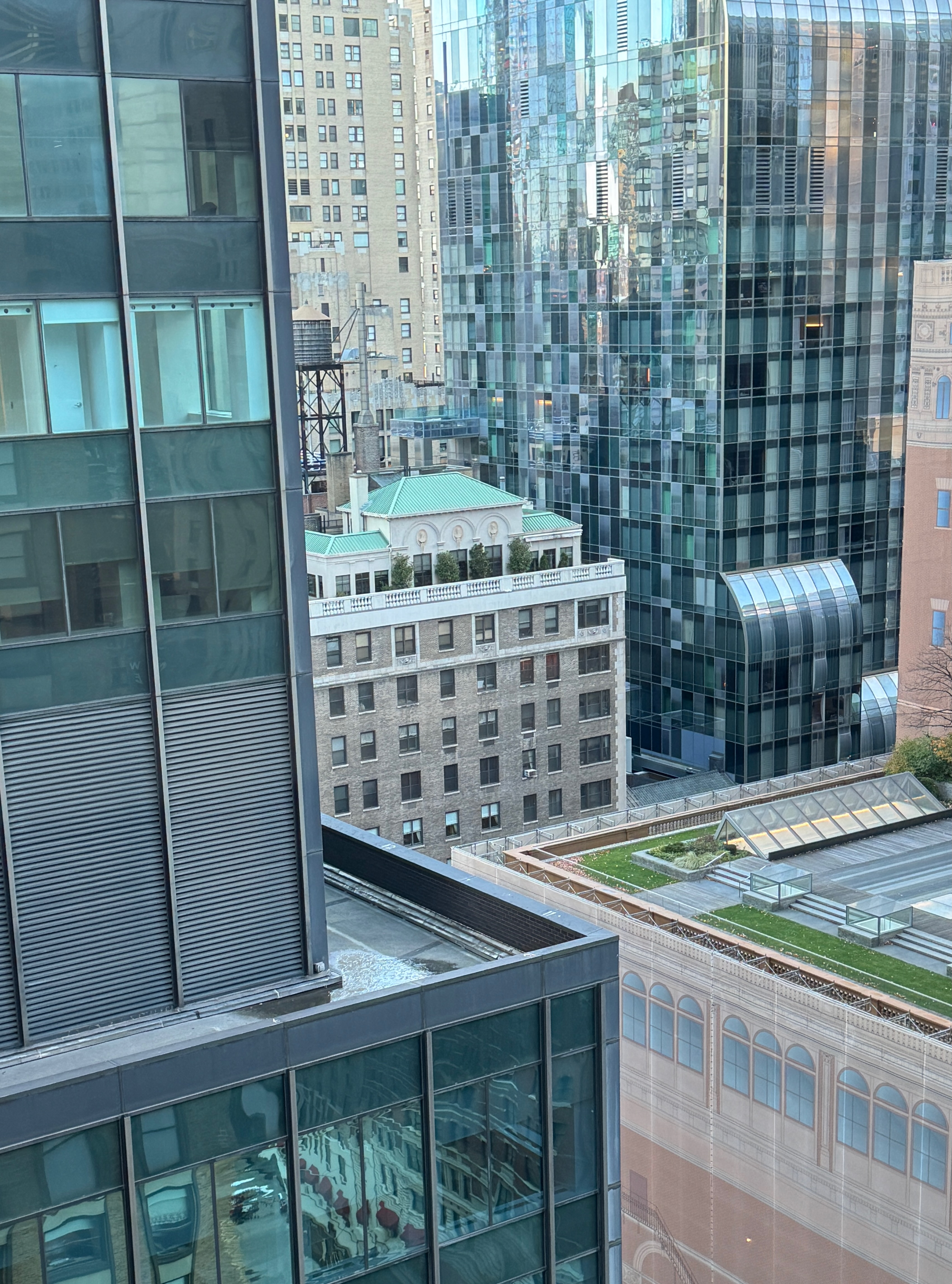
The Briarcliffe penthouse apartment, viewed from The Manhattan Club, one block to the southwest, on 56th Street

Charles K. Eagle, who moved to the property in October 1923 from the Rodin Studios diagonally across Seventh Avenue and 57th Street, built himself a 5,573-square-foot penthouse apartment, with a 1,847-square-foot terrace that wraps around the southwestern corner of the building.

During its construction in 1921, and at a cost of $8,000, Eagle had extra steel beams included in the terrace's construction to support extensive garden plantings. "My wife and I have always loved the country and growing things, flowers and birds. Why should we have to leave town in search of the things that made us happy?" As such, the terrace featured flower beds, Japanese pines, a fountain with speckled trout, birdhouses and pheasants and squirrels.

Eagle's wife, Tecla, suffered a nervous breakdown during their time at the Briarcliffe. In the summer of 1928, Eagle, who had been battling a three-week attack of insomnia, committed suicide at the apartment. He had sold the property one month earlier. When his will was probated, his estate had been hit by the Wall Street Crash of 1929, for what was once worth $3.9 million was now worth $141,000. At the time of his death, he owed $3 million to Chase Bank, due in two months.

After work was undertaken on it by interior designer Mario Buatta, the penthouse was sold again in 2007. Having been a five-bedroom apartment in Charles Eagle's day, the introduction of an office, an exercise room, and a media room, it was considered one-bedroom.

Former Secretary of Commerce Wilbur Ross bought the penthouse for $18 million in 2007. He put it up for sale in October 2015 for $21 million; by March 2017 it had dropped to $16.5 million, which was less than he bought it for. It was listed as having fourteen rooms, including four bedrooms and five-and-a-half bathrooms. It sold, at a loss, in October 2017, two years after it was first listed. Its price tag was $15.95 million.
