= Japanese pine =

Right panel of the Pine Trees screen (松林図 屏風, Shōrin-zu byōbu) by Hasegawa Tōhaku (1539–1610). The painting has been designated as National Treasure.

Japanese pine is a common name for several plants and may refer to:

- Pinus densiflora, the Japanese red pine
- Pinus thunbergii, the Japanese black pine
