= Shōrin-zu byōbu =

Pair of six-panel folding screens by Hasegawa Tōhaku

Pine trees (松林図) by Hasegawa Tōhaku

Left panel

Right panel

The Pine Trees screen (松林図 屏風, Shōrin-zu byōbu) is a pair of six-panel folding screens (byōbu) by the Japanese artist Hasegawa Tōhaku (長谷川 等伯), founder of the Hasegawa school of Japanese art. The precise date for the screens is not known, but they were clearly made in the late 16th century, in the Momoyama period, around 1595. The screens are held by the Tokyo National Museum, and were designated as a National Treasure of Japan in 1952.

The ink-on-paper work depicts a view of Japanese pine trees in the mist, with parts of the trees visible and parts obscured, illustrating the Zen Buddhist concept of ma (間) and evoking the Japanese wabi (侘) aesthetic of rustic simplicity. They are said to be the first paintings of their scale to depict only trees as subject matter, although a white shape to the upper right of the left panel might suggest a background mountain peak. Each screen measures 156.8 by 356 centimetres (61.7 in × 140.2 in).

== Construction ==
The screens are made of a relatively rough silk or paper medium, and form twelve panels consisting of six joined pieces of paper. Tōhaku used a straw brush to achieve the scale required of the screens.

Some aspects of the screen's construction suggest that the piece may have been a preparatory work: the top and bottom pieces of joined paper on each screen are half the typical size used for screens; the sizes of paper used in each screen are slightly different, and the joins between the sheets are not completely regular. The seals for the artist's names, "Hasegawa" and "Tōhaku", do not use the usual forms. The trees on the far right of the right panel are cropped, suggesting that the order of the panels may have been altered or that some may have been replaced.

== Style of painting ==
The work is a development of suibokuga (水墨画, ink-wash paintings) made with Chinese ink (墨, sumi), using dark and light shades on a silk or paper medium. It combines naturalistic Chinese ideas of ink painting by Muqi Fachang (Chinese: 牧溪法常; pinyin: Mu-ch'i Fa-ch'ang) with themes from the Japanese yamato-e (大和絵) landscape tradition, influenced by the "splashed ink" (溌墨, hatsuboku) works of Sesshū Tōyō. The painting makes use of the intended foldings of the screen in use to create perspective, with branches directed towards or away from the viewer. Though the paintings are based in Chinese ideas of ink painting, monochrome ink-wash paintings on such a large scale was a Japanese innovation never seen in China; here Tōhaku used a straw brush on relatively coarse paper to achieve the right brush effects on a large scale.

== See also ==
- List of National Treasures of Japan (paintings)
