= Hasegawa Tōhaku =

Japanese painter (1539–1610)

Hasegawa Tōhaku; 長谷川 等伯
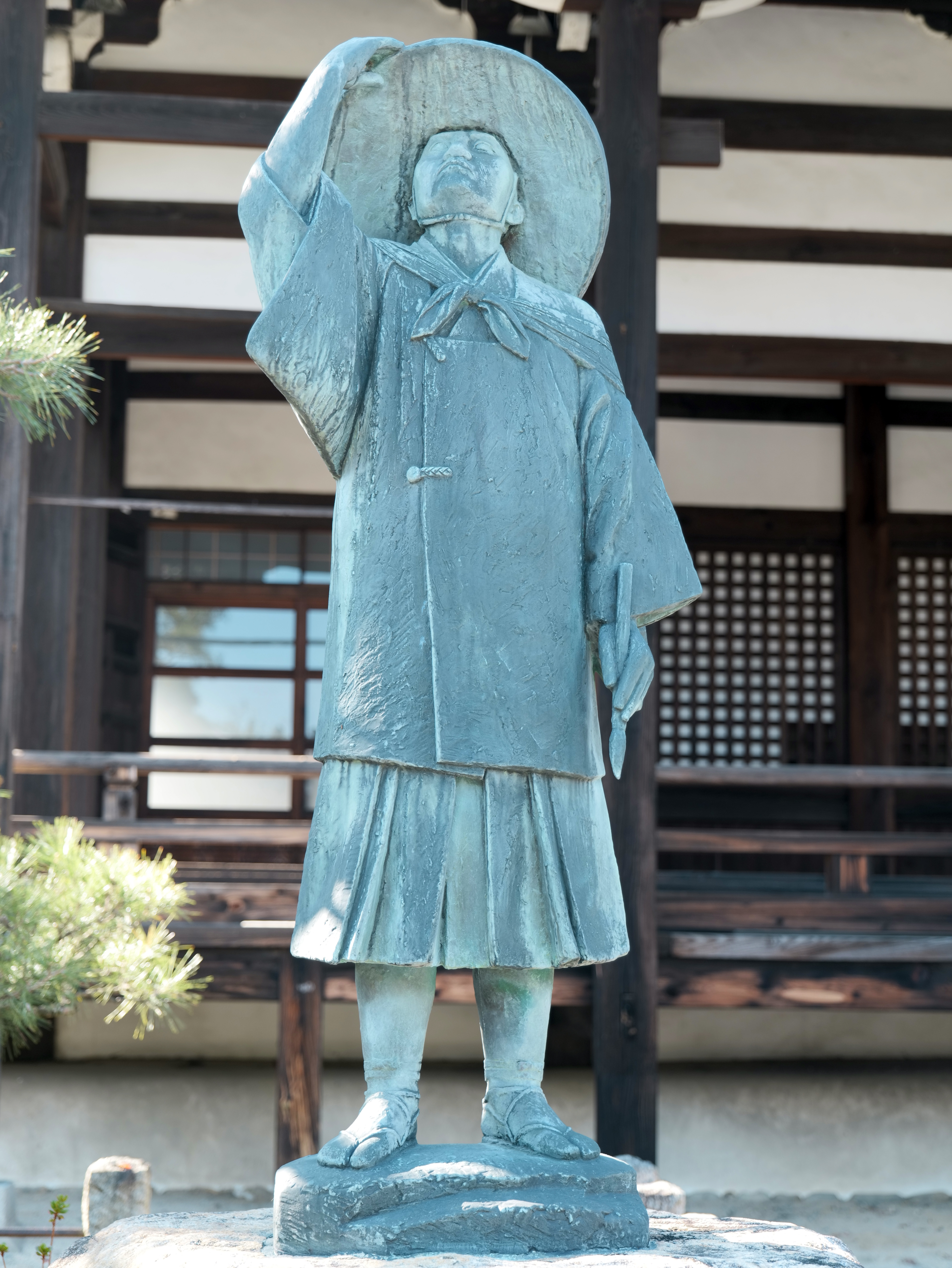
- Statue of Tōhaku at Honpō-ji, Kyoto
- Born: 1539; Nanao, Noto Province, Japan
- Died: March 19, 1610 (aged 70–71); Edo (Tokyo), Japan
- Known for: Painting (sumie)
- Notable work: Pine Trees (National Treasure); Pine Tree and Flowering Plants (National Treasure); Portrait of Nawa Nagatoshi (Important Cultural Property)
- Movement: Hasegawa school
- Patrons: Toyotomi Hideyoshi, Tokugawa Ieyasu

Hasegawa Tōhaku (長谷川 等伯; 1539 – March 19, 1610) was a Japanese painter and founder of the Hasegawa school.

He is considered one of the great painters of the Azuchi–Momoyama period (1573–1603), and he is best known for his byōbu folding screens, such as Pine Trees and Pine Tree and Flowering Plants (both registered National Treasures), or the paintings on the walls and sliding doors at Chishaku-in, attributed to him and his son (also National Treasures).

== Biography ==
Hasegawa Tōhaku, born Okumura Tōhaku (奥村 等伯) in 1539 in Nanao, a town in Noto Province (in the vicinity of present-day Ishikawa Prefecture) to a noted local family of cloth dyers, although evidence shows that Tōhaku's original family name was Okumura and that he was adopted into the Hasegawa family.

Tōhaku started his artistic career as a painter of Buddhist paintings in his home province of Noto. His pictures include: Portrait of Takeda Shingen” (Seikei Temple of Mount Kōya), “Picture of Twelve Devas” (Ishikawa Shōkaku Temple) and “Portrait of Nawa Nagatoshi”.

By the age of 20, Tōhaku was a professional painter, and by his thirties had moved to Kyoto to study under the prestigious Kanō school, then headed by Kanō Shōei. The Kanō school was well known at the time for their large bold paintings that decorated the castle walls of many a wealthy warlord patron. These were often ink on white paper or gold-leaf decorative wall panels that served a dual purpose of reflecting light around the dim castle rooms as well as flaunting the castle owner's abundant wealth to commission such extravagant pieces. Many of Tōhaku's earlier works are in the style of the Kanō school, such as his Maple, Chishaku-in painted in 1593.

At the same time, he also studied the older Song, Yuan and Muromachi periods' styles of ink painting by examining scrolls from Mu Qi and Sesshū Tōyō, which he is believed to have gained access to in his time at the Daitoku-ji temple in Kyoto. After a period of time in Kyoto, Tōhaku developed his own style of sumie which in many ways departed from the bold techniques indicative of the Kanō school, and called back to the minimalism of its predecessors. The works of Sesshū Tōyō in particular influenced Tōhaku's redirection of artistic style as Tōhaku also studied under Sesshū's successor, Toshun for some time. Tōhaku was in fact so much enamored with the techniques of Sesshū that he attempted to claim rights as his fifth successor, though he lost in a court battle to Unkoku Togan. Still, the influence of Sesshū is evident in many of Tōhaku's mid to late works, such as his Shōrin-zu byōbu (松林図 屏風, Pine Trees screen), which were declared a national treasure of Japan are argued to be the first paintings of their scale to depict only pine trees as subject matter.

Left panel of the Pine Trees screen (松林図 屏風, Shōrin-zu byōbu), c. 1595, six-fold screen, ink on paper, National Treasure.

Right panel of the Pine Trees screen (松林図 屏風, Shōrin-zu byōbu), c. 1595, six-fold screen, ink on paper, National Treasure.

The school founded by Hasegawa Tōhaku is known today as the Hasegawa school. This school was small; consisting mostly of Tōhaku and his sons. However, its members conserved Tōhaku's quiet and reserved aesthetic, which many attribute to the influence of Sesshū as well as his contemporary and friend, Sen no Rikyū. It is suspected that these simple aesthetics protested the usage of intimidation and wealth rampant in the Kanō school.

Tōhaku's most noted contemporary was Kanō Eitoku, who often competed with Tōhaku for the patronage of Toyotomi Hideyoshi. After Eitoku's death in 1590, Tōhaku stood alone as the greatest living master of his time. He became the official painter for Hideyoshi, and produced some of his greatest and most elegant paintings under his patronage. He and his atelier produced the wall and screen paintings in Shoun-ji (temple), commissioned by Toyotomi Hideyoshi in 1593. The paintings were moved to Chishaku-in (temple), Kyoto and have survived. At the age of 67, Tōhaku was summoned to Edo and granted the priestly title of hōgen by the shōgun Tokugawa Ieyasu. There he stayed for the remainder of his life.

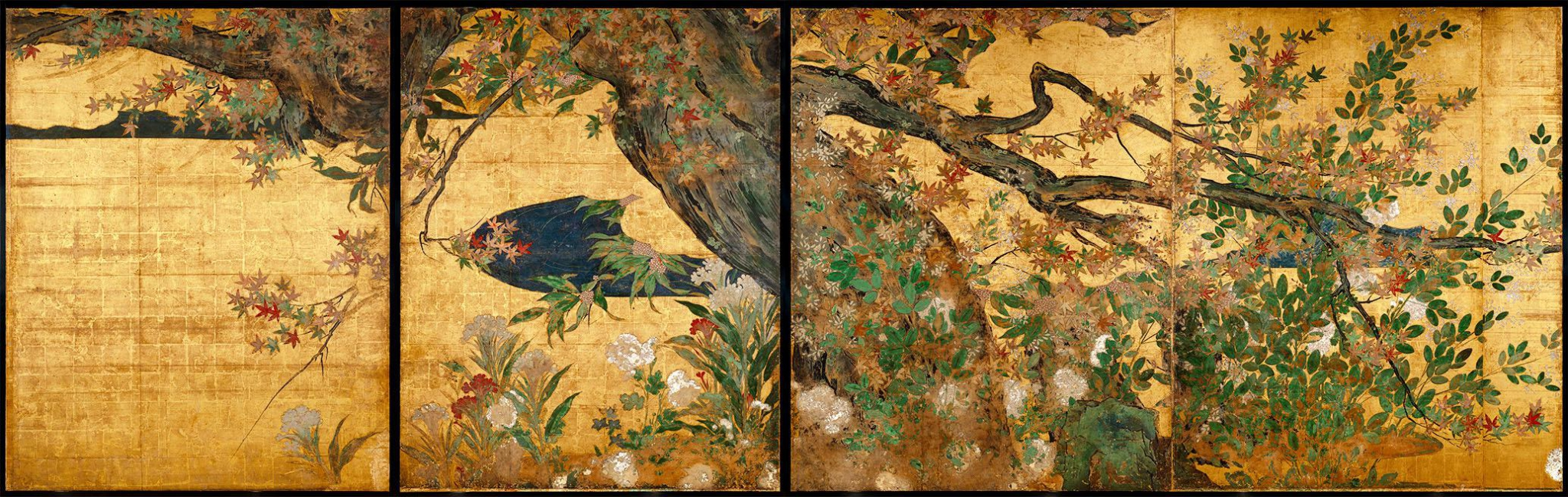
Maple, colour on gold paper, at Chishaku-in, Kyoto (1593), National Treasure.

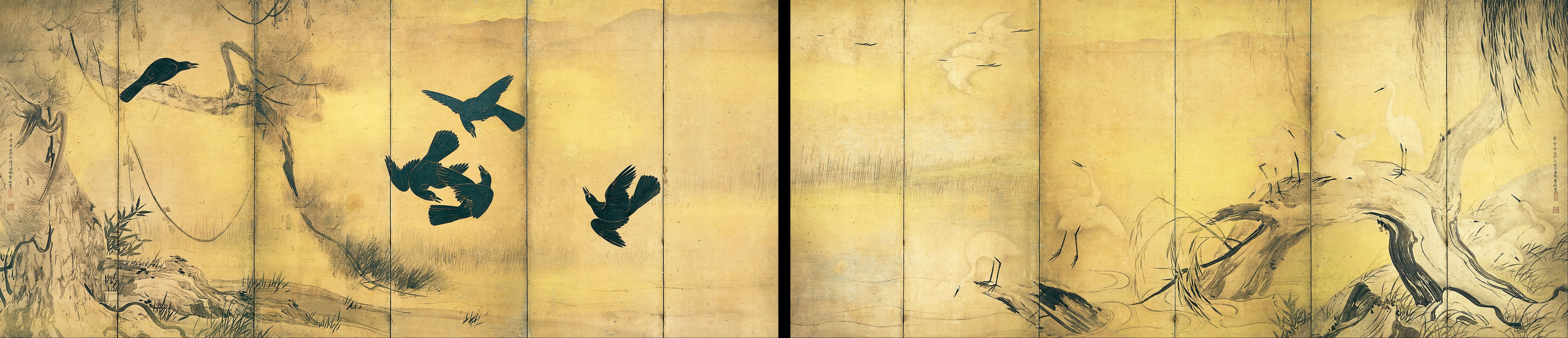
Crows and Herons, Contemporary Art Foundation (ja), Important Cultural Property

== See also ==
- Chōjirō
