= 5 Columbus Circle =

Office building in Manhattan, New York

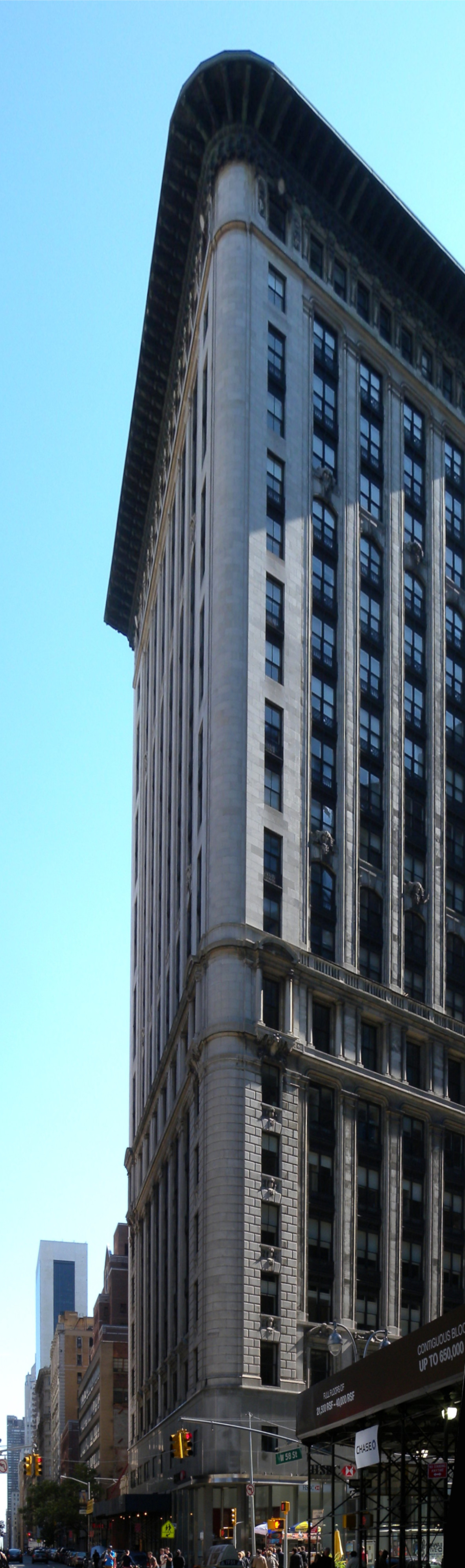
- Interactive map of the 5 Columbus Circle area
- Former names: United States Rubber Company Building
- Alternative names: 1790 Broadway

General information
- Type: Office
- Architectural style: Beaux-Arts
- Location: 1790 Broadway, Manhattan, New York, United States
- Coordinates: 40°46′00″N 73°58′53″W
- Groundbreaking: 1911
- Opened: 1912

Height
- Height: 286 feet (87 m)

Technical details
- Floor count: 20
- Lifts/elevators: 8

Design and construction
- Architect: Carrère and Hastings
- Main contractor: Norcross Brothers

New York City Landmark
- Designated: December 19, 2000
- Reference no.: 2078

5 Columbus Circle (also known as 1790 Broadway and formerly known as the United States Rubber Company Building) is an office building on the southeast corner of Broadway and 58th Street, just south of Columbus Circle, in the Midtown Manhattan neighborhood of New York City, New York, United States. Designed by Carrère and Hastings in the Beaux-Arts style, it is 286 feet (87 m) tall with 20 stories.

The building contains a marble facade with a copper cornice above the 20th story. The windows are grouped into recessed bays, separated horizontally by metal spandrels and vertically by narrow piers. The base contains part of a flagship store for Nordstrom, which extends into Central Park Tower and another building.

5 Columbus Circle was originally built as the headquarters of the United States Rubber Company (U.S. Rubber) in 1912. It was part of Broadway's "Automobile Row" during the early 20th century. U.S. Rubber moved to a new headquarters in 1940, and the building was sold several times before being acquired by the West Side Federal Savings and Loan Association. The First Nationwide Savings Bank, which acquired the West Side Federal Savings and Loan Association, sold the building in 1985 to John Phufas and John O'Donnell, and small renovations were undertaken in subsequent years. The New York City Landmarks Preservation Commission designated the building as a city landmark in 2000.

== Site ==
5 Columbus Circle is on the southeastern corner of Broadway and 58th Street, one block south of Columbus Circle and Central Park in the Midtown Manhattan neighborhood of New York City. The building carries the addresses 1784–1790 Broadway and 234 West 58th Street. The site measures 108 by 126 feet (33 by 38 m). Neighboring buildings include Central Park Tower's base to the south; Central Park Tower and the American Fine Arts Society building to the east; 240 Central Park South, Gainsborough Studios, and 220 Central Park South across 58th Street to the north; and 2 Columbus Circle to the northwest across both Broadway and 58th Street.

In the 20th century, the area was part of Manhattan's "Automobile Row", a stretch of Broadway extending mainly between Times Square at 42nd Street and Sherman Square at 72nd Street. Before the first decade of the 20th century, the area was occupied mostly by equestrian industries and was described by The New York Times as "thoroughly lifeless". By 1907, the Times characterized this section of Broadway as having "almost a solid line of motor vehicle signs all the way from Times Square to Sherman Square". In the late 1900s and early 1910s, several large automobile showrooms, stores, and garages were built on Broadway, including the B.F. Goodrich showroom (later part of Central Park Tower) and 224 West 57th Street just south of 5 Columbus Circle. During that time, 5 Columbus Circle was one of several such major developments in the area. 5 Columbus Circle in particular was the first tall building on Broadway north of Times Square, being surrounded by tenements when it was completed.

== Architecture ==
5 Columbus Circle is 286 feet (87 m) tall, with 20 stories and a penthouse, as well as two basement levels. The largely marble-clad building was designed by Carrère and Hastings. The building was erected by Norcross Brothers. For their design of 5 Columbus Circle, Carrère and Hastings took inspiration from their past work, which was largely in the French Renaissance style, including the former Blair Building in Manhattan's Financial District. There is also a "light court" on the eastern side of the building, facing Central Park Tower; it allowed sunlight to reach the interior offices at the time of 5 Columbus Circle's construction.

=== Facade ===
5 Columbus Circle has a curtain wall facade made mainly of Vermont marble. This is a contrast to many commercial structures of the time, which mostly contained facades of brick, limestone, or terracotta, 5 Columbus Circle's main elevations, or sides, face 58th Street to the north and Broadway to the west. The two primary elevations are connected by a curved corner; the marble cladding served to emphasize the thinness of the curtain wall. The curved corner, similar to one on the Flatiron Building, is clad with smooth stone to soften the acute angle facing 58th Street and Broadway. On each floor, there are seven bays facing Broadway and eight facing 58th Street. The eastern and southern facades are faced in plain brick with some window openings on either side. The northern and western facades' windows have kalamein frames and sashes, while the eastern and southern facades have wire glass.

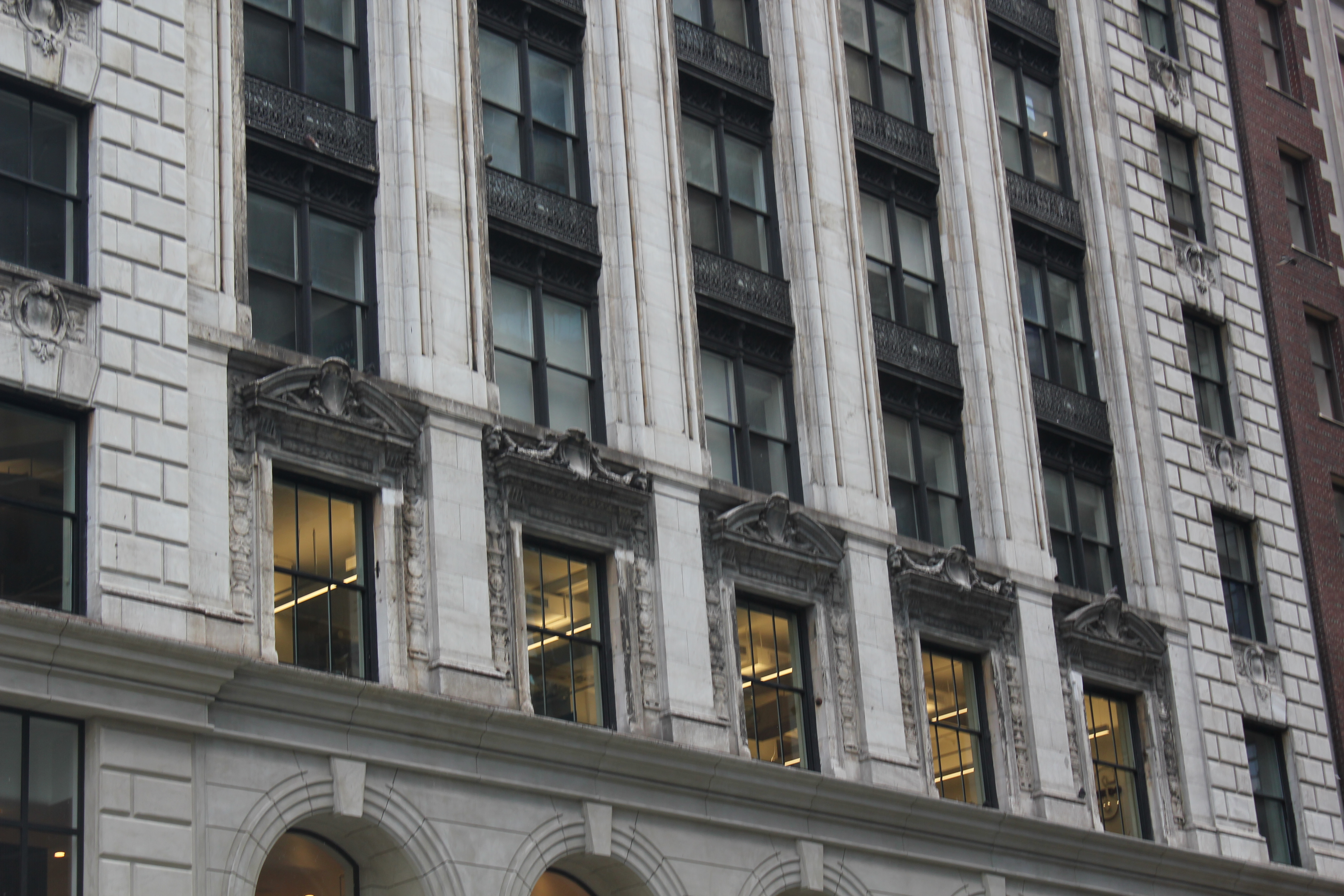
Third story detail

The main entrance to the building, in the southernmost bay facing Broadway, contains a double door of bronze and glass beneath a glass transom. A freight entrance is in the two eastern bays on 58th Street. The lowest two stories have a colonnade of Ionic columns, looking into the Nordstrom store in the base. There are arched windows on the 1st and 2nd stories, looking from the street into the Nordstrom store. These are replicas of the original windows that looked into the salesroom of the building's namesake, the United States Rubber Company (U.S. Rubber). After the 1958 renovation, there was a door at the corner of Broadway and 58th Street, leading to a ground-level banking space. The remainder of the 1st floor contained double-height display windows. The 2nd floor was clad with gray marble panels, with a stone band course running above it. These modifications were removed starting in 2018, when the base was restored to its original design.

On the 3rd through 19th stories, the outermost bays on Broadway and 58th Street are clad with rusticated stone, while the center bays are recessed between flat stone piers. The outermost bays have sash windows topped by stone voussoirs on the 3rd through 6th stories and by elaborate carvings on the 7th story. The center bays have elaborate stone surrounds around the 3rd-story windows and sash windows with metal spandrels on the 4th through 7th stories. The 8th story is treated as a transitional story, with band courses below and above it. The outer bays of the 8th story contain rounded pediments that are part of the band course above.

A balustrade wraps around the 9th story, atop the band course. The 9th through 19th stories contain rectangular sash windows in the side bays (with spandrels between each pairing of two stories). The center bays have sash windows with metal railings, which are recessed between piers, as well as metal spandrel panels between the windows on each floor, except for stone panels above the 10th and 16th floors. There is a band course above the 19th story. The 20th story has twelve sash windows on each side, with carved window surrounds in the outer bays. The facades on Broadway and 58th Street are topped by a large copper cornice. The roof was originally made of tile measuring 6 by 9 inches (150 by 230 mm) atop a layer of waterproofing.

=== Interior ===
5 Columbus Circle has 196,000 square feet (18,200 m^{2}) of floor space. This provided approximately 6,300 square feet (590 m^{2}) of usable office space on each floor, with up to 17 offices on each floor. Like other buildings of its era, 5 Columbus Circle has a steel superstructure and inverted floor arches made of architectural terracotta. 5 Columbus Circle was erected with ten Otis elevators and lifts, as well as two emergency staircases. Three passenger elevators were designed as "local" elevators for lower stories, while three others were "express" elevators for upper stories. In addition, there was a private passenger elevator, two freight elevators (one each for U.S. Rubber and other tenants), and a dumbwaiter. The stairs were made of iron and steel with treads made of marble, slate, or rubber. As of 2018, the building has six passenger and two freight elevators.

When completed in 1912, 5 Columbus Circle was intended exclusively for office and mercantile use. U.S. Rubber had a salesroom on the ground level and a basement and subbasement for tire storage. The subbasement floor is 26.33 feet (8.03 m) below street level and contained the boiler room. The salesroom had a rubber-tiled floor, Botticino marble wall bases, Caen stone walls, and plastered ceilings. Additionally, there was a lobby at the southeastern corner, which served two stairs and six elevators. The lobby had a similar decoration to the salesroom. As of 2018, the lower stories contain part of Nordstrom's 360,000-square-foot (33,000 m^{2}) flagship store, which extends into Central Park Tower and 1776 Broadway. The portion of the store within 5 Columbus Circle covers 8,000 square feet (740 m^{2}) and contains a bar.

The second through 13th floors were intended for rent and could be split up into modules of 280 to 630 square feet (26 to 59 m^{2}). The 14th through 20th floors were for U.S. Rubber's use. The 15th through 17th floors were used as the company's general offices. On these floors, each office is separated by hollow-tile or metal partitions, although fireproof wood is used in "special rooms" on two of the upper stories. Most of the interior trim is made of hollow metal, while the floor surfaces used masonry, marble, or rubber tiling. African mahogany was used for the fireproof wood trim. Doorways next to mahogany wood trim were colored to match the trim, and other doors were colored gray. The upper four floors contain fireplaces. The fireproofing measures were included in the aftermath of the Triangle Shirtwaist Factory fire in 1911. The corporate offices and the tire division in the basement were connected by a pneumatic tube communication system.

== History ==
=== Construction and early use ===
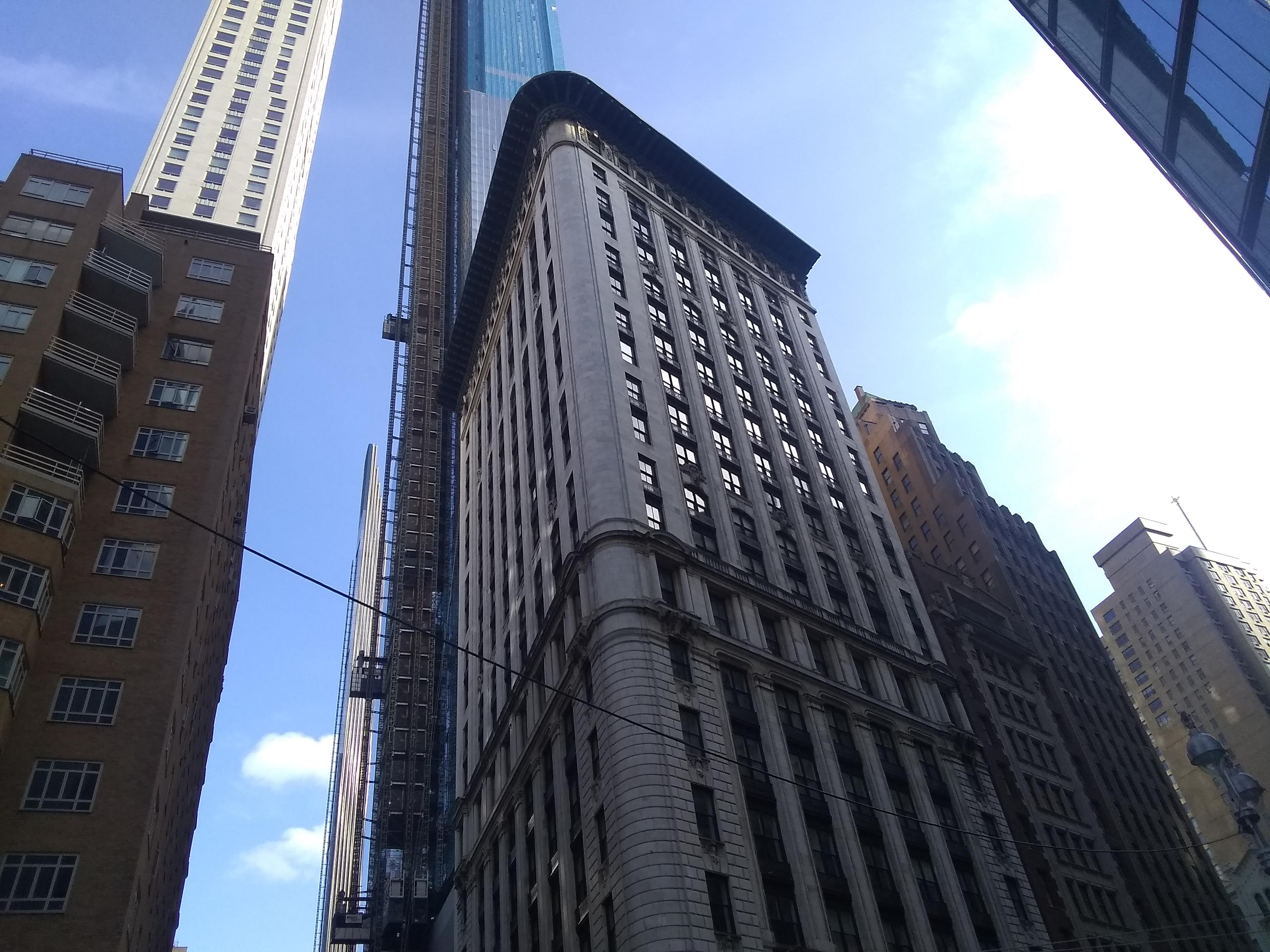
The upper stories, viewed from Broadway and 58th Street

In the years after its founding in 1892, U.S. Rubber came to control 70 percent of the United States' rubber footwear market and also became a top seller of tires. Prior to the completion of 5 Columbus Circle, U.S. Rubber was headquartered in New Brunswick, New Jersey. In April 1911, U.S. Rubber leased the lot at the southeast corner of Broadway and 58th Street from Mary A. Fitzgerald for 21 years at a cost of $4,000 per year (equivalent to $97,650 in 2024). Carrère and Hastings drew up plans for a 20-story office building on the site, which would provide sufficient space for a new headquarters. When the plans were released in August 1911, the planned building was described by the New-York Tribune and The New York Times as the tallest structure on Broadway north of Times Square.

Demolition of the site had begun in May 1911 after the site had been acquired. The U.S. Rubber Building was completed and ready for occupancy in mid-1912, with tenants moving there by May 1 of that year. Upon the building's completion, U.S. Rubber occupied the ground-floor showroom, basements, and ten of the upper floors. The 15th through 17th floors were used as the company's general offices. The other floors were rented to various tenants, including the Society of Automobile Engineers, the Timken Roller Bearing Company, the National Tuberculosis Association, and taxi operator Keystone Transportation Company.

The Fitzgerald estate sold the Schulte Real Estate Company the site for $1.1 million in 1928, and property title was then passed to businessman August Heckscher. U.S. Rubber acquired the land under the building outright in 1932, upon the expiration of the original lease. At the time of U.S. Rubber's land purchase, the Metropolitan Life Insurance Company had a mortgage loan of $800,000 against the property.

=== Later owners ===
In December 1939, U.S. Rubber sold 1790 Broadway after acquiring space at the then-new 1230 Avenue of the Americas in Rockefeller Center, paying off its mortgage on 1790 Broadway. U.S. Rubber moved its offices to Rockefeller Center three months later in March 1940, and the 8th through 14th floors at 5 Columbus Circle were rented to the National Health Council that October. 5 Columbus Circle was sold several times in subsequent years, including to Richard M. Lederer in 1944. The building was acquired in 1951 by the West Side Federal Savings and Loan Association bank, which hired Herbert Tannenbaum to remodel the ground level, second floor, and basement for its use. In 1959, the bank hired Tannenbaum again to redesign the lowest two stories of the facade in 1959, replacing the original cladding with a glass and gray-marble insert. In an interview with journalist Christopher Gray four decades later, Tannenbaum expressed regret for the renovation, saying, "It broke my heart to tear those beautiful Ionic columns out."

During the mid-20th century, the United States Department of State leased several floors at 5 Columbus Circle, while the NAACP also had its headquarters in the building from 1967 to 1982. The First Nationwide Savings Bank, which acquired West Side Federal Savings, sold the building in 1985 to John Phufas and John O'Donnell for $29.25 million. Phufas and O'Donnell hired Beyer Blinder Belle to renovate the space, and First Nationwide would continue to occupy eight floors. The renovation was complicated by the fact that no drawings of the original lobby design could be found. Nevertheless, the original ceiling rosettes and frieze were concealed above the dropped ceiling, and they were restored after a Beyer Blinder Belle associate discovered them. The facade was also cleaned, but First Nationwide did not follow through with a plan to restore the lower section of the facade, which was estimated to cost at least $1 million. In early 2000, the building's owner 1790 Broadway Associates added windows to the second story of the facade. The New York City Landmarks Preservation Commission (LPC) designated 5 Columbus Circle, along with 224 West 57th Street and the Studebaker Building in Brooklyn, as official city landmarks on December 19, 2000.

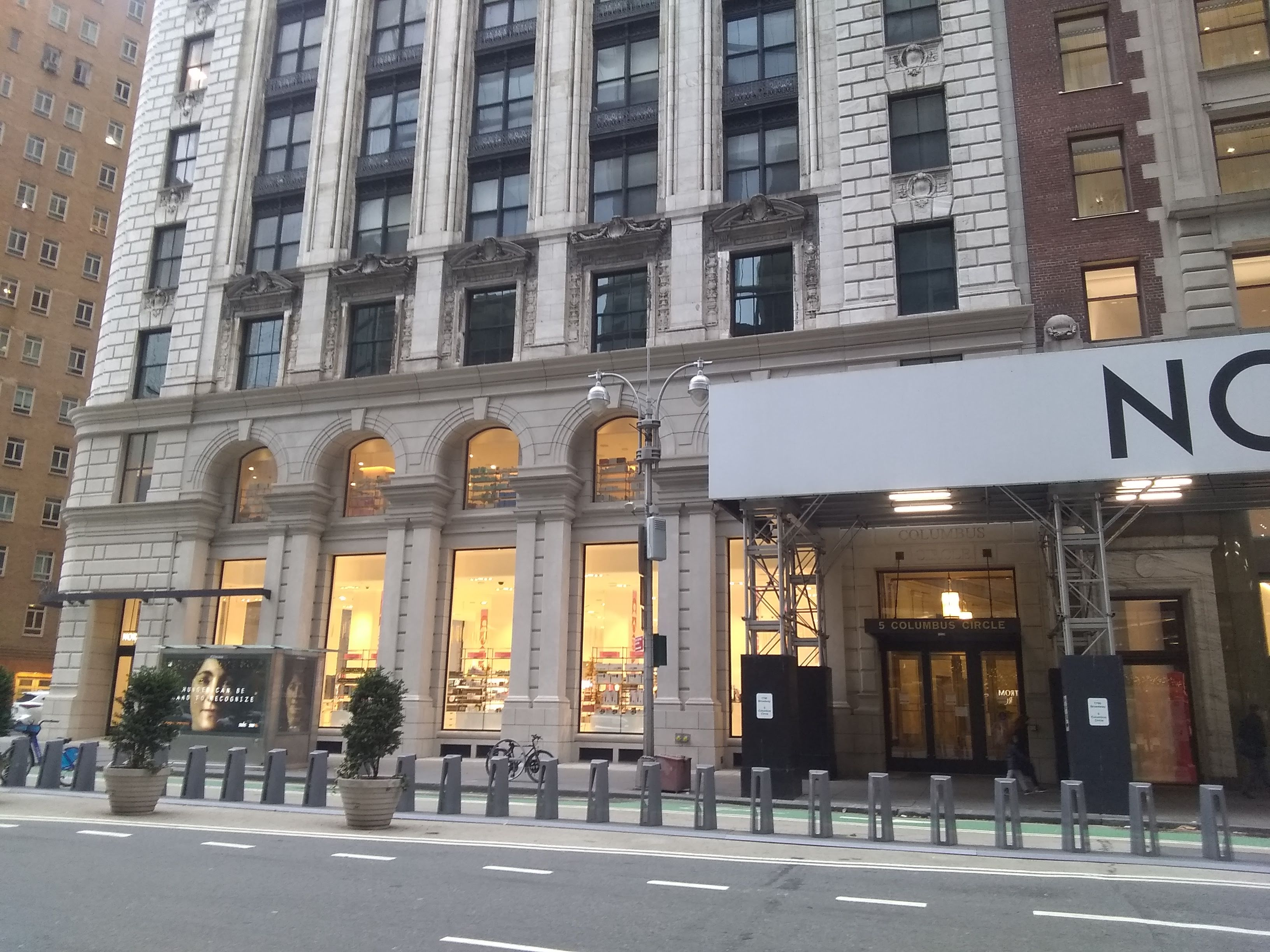
Reconstructed base, seen alongside the restored B. F. Goodrich Building facade at right, in 2020

Nordstrom signed a lease for retail space at the neighboring Central Park Tower in 2012 during that tower's construction. As part of the lease, Nordstrom would also occupy some space at 1776 Broadway and 5 Columbus Circle. In 2018, 1790 Broadway Associates announced plans to renovate the building's facade. The lowest two stories were re-clad with marble, and the elevators, boilers and cooling towers, and windows were replaced at a cost of $10 million. The Nordstrom store opened in late 2019, and Kaplan, Inc. also took space in the building that year.

== Critical reception ==
In 1989, Christopher Gray wrote for The New York Times that "Up close [5 Columbus Circle] is all debonair urbanism [...] but from afar the marble ornament is harder to see and it becomes a sleek skyscraper." David W. Dunlap wrote for the same paper in 2000 that 5 Columbus Circle was the "cynosure of Automobile Row", with its rounded corner resembling "an alabaster version of the Flatiron Building".

== See also ==
- List of buildings and structures on Broadway in Manhattan
- List of New York City Designated Landmarks in Manhattan from 14th to 59th Streets
