= American Fine Arts Society =

Building in Manhattan, New York

- U.S. National Register of Historic Places
- New York State Register of Historic Places
- New York City Landmark
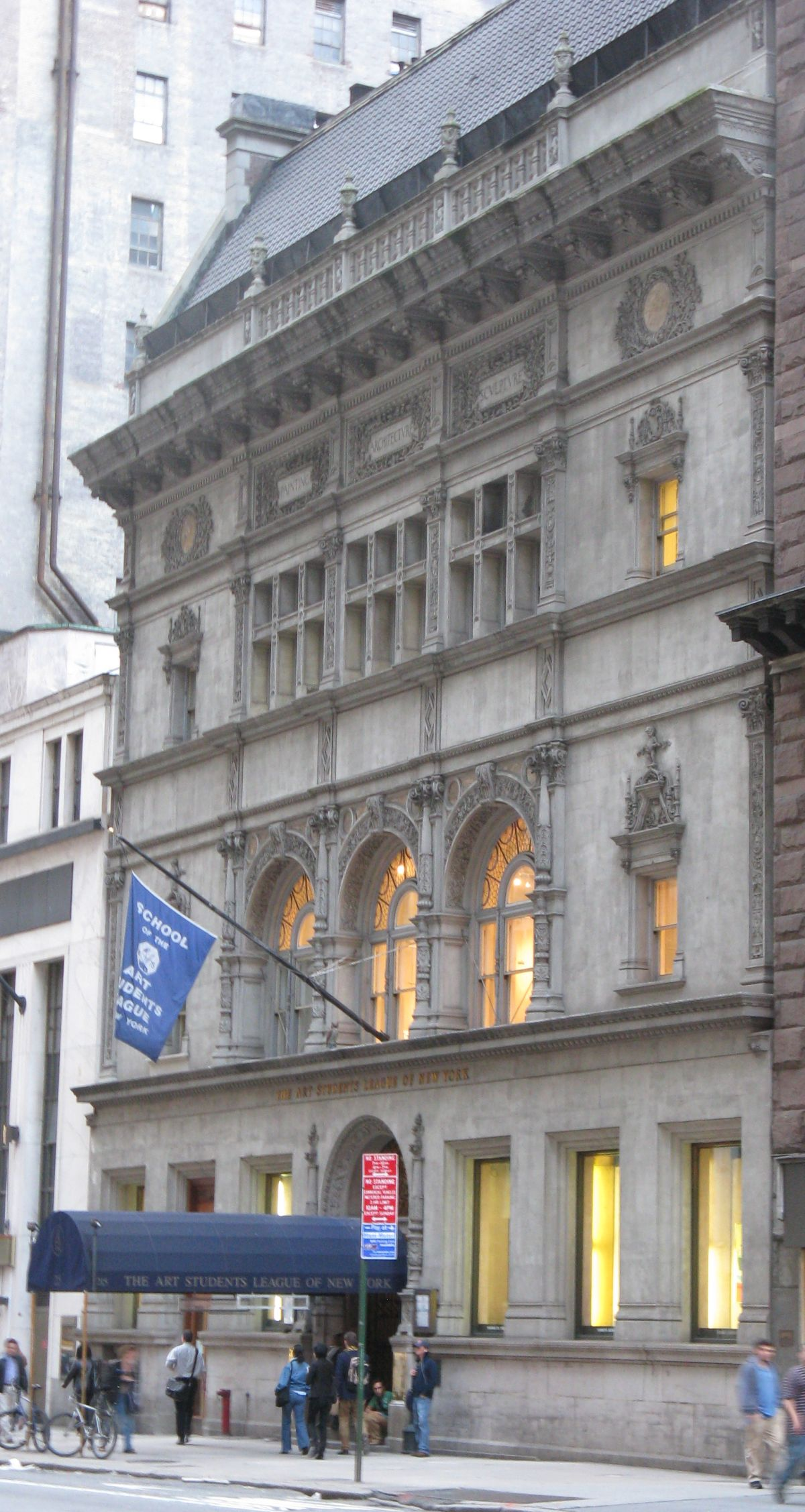
- (2008)
- Location: 215 West 57th Street, Manhattan, New York
- Coordinates: 40°45′58″N 73°58′50″W
- Built: 1891
- Architect: Henry J. Hardenbergh
- Architectural style: French Renaissance
- NRHP reference No.: 80002662
- NYSRHP No.: 06101.001751
- NYCL No.: 0255

Significant dates
- Added to NRHP: May 6, 1980
- Designated NYSRHP: June 23, 1980
- Designated NYCL: December 10, 1968

The Art Students League of New York Building (also the American Fine Arts Society and 215 West 57th Street) is a building on 57th Street in Midtown Manhattan in New York City. The structure, designed by Henry Janeway Hardenbergh in the French Renaissance style, was completed in December 1892 and serves as the headquarters of the Art Students League of New York. The building was developed by the American Fine Arts Society (AFAS), formed in 1889 by five organizations including the Art Students League, the Society of American Artists, and the Architectural League of New York.

The Art Students League Building is five stories tall. Its primary facade along 57th Street is clad with limestone and contains ornate decoration. The rear is clad with brick faces 58th Street and is more simple in design. The building's interior contains meeting, classroom, and gallery space for the Art Students League; the space was previously divided among the AFAS's constituent organizations.

The Art Students League Building has been modified several times throughout its history, and it was repaired following major fires in 1901 and 1920. The building was used exclusively by the Art Students League by 1941, with the other organizations having moved out during the early 20th century. The Art Students League Building was designated as a New York City landmark in 1968 and added to the National Register of Historic Places in 1980. The building was renovated in 2003, and part of the adjacent Central Park Tower was constructed above it in the late 2010s.

== Site ==
The Art Students League of New York Building is at 215 West 57th Street in the Midtown Manhattan neighborhood of New York City, just south of Central Park, between Seventh Avenue to the east and Broadway to the west. The building faces 57th Street to the south and 58th Street to the north. The rectangular site covers 15,062 square feet (1,399.3 m^{2}), with a frontage or lot-line length of 75 feet (23 m) on 57th and 58th Streets and a depth of 200.83 feet (61.21 m) between the two streets.

The Art Students League Building shares the city block with the Osborne apartment building to the east, the Central Park Tower and 5 Columbus Circle to the west, and the Saint Thomas Choir School to the north. It also faces 224 West 57th Street to the southwest; 218 West 57th Street (the former Society House of the American Society of Civil Engineers) and 888 Seventh Avenue to the southeast; the Rodin Studios and Carnegie Hall to the southeast; and 200 and 220 Central Park South to the north.

The Art Students League Building is part of a former artistic hub around a two-block section of West 57th Street between Sixth Avenue and Broadway. The hub had been developed during the late 19th and early 20th centuries. The hub was developed following the opening of Carnegie Hall in 1891. The area contains several buildings constructed as residences for artists and musicians, such as 130 and 140 West 57th Street, the Rodin Studios, and the Osborne Apartments. In addition, the area contained the headquarters of organizations such as the American Fine Arts Society, the Lotos Club, and the American Society of Civil Engineers. By the 21st century, the artistic hub had largely been replaced with Billionaires' Row, a series of luxury skyscrapers around the southern end of Central Park.

== Architecture ==
The Art Students League Building at 215 West 57th Street was designed by Henry Janeway Hardenbergh in the French Renaissance style. The structure was built for the American Fine Arts Society (AFAS), which was composed of the Society of American Artists, the Architectural League of New York, and the Art Students League of New York. Contemporary sources describe the design as being "of the epoch of Francis I". The building is five stories tall, although the 57th Street facade rises four stories and the 58th Street facade is three stories. A light court divides the wings on 57th and 58th Street. The building is topped by a mansard roof made of clay tiles.

=== Facade ===
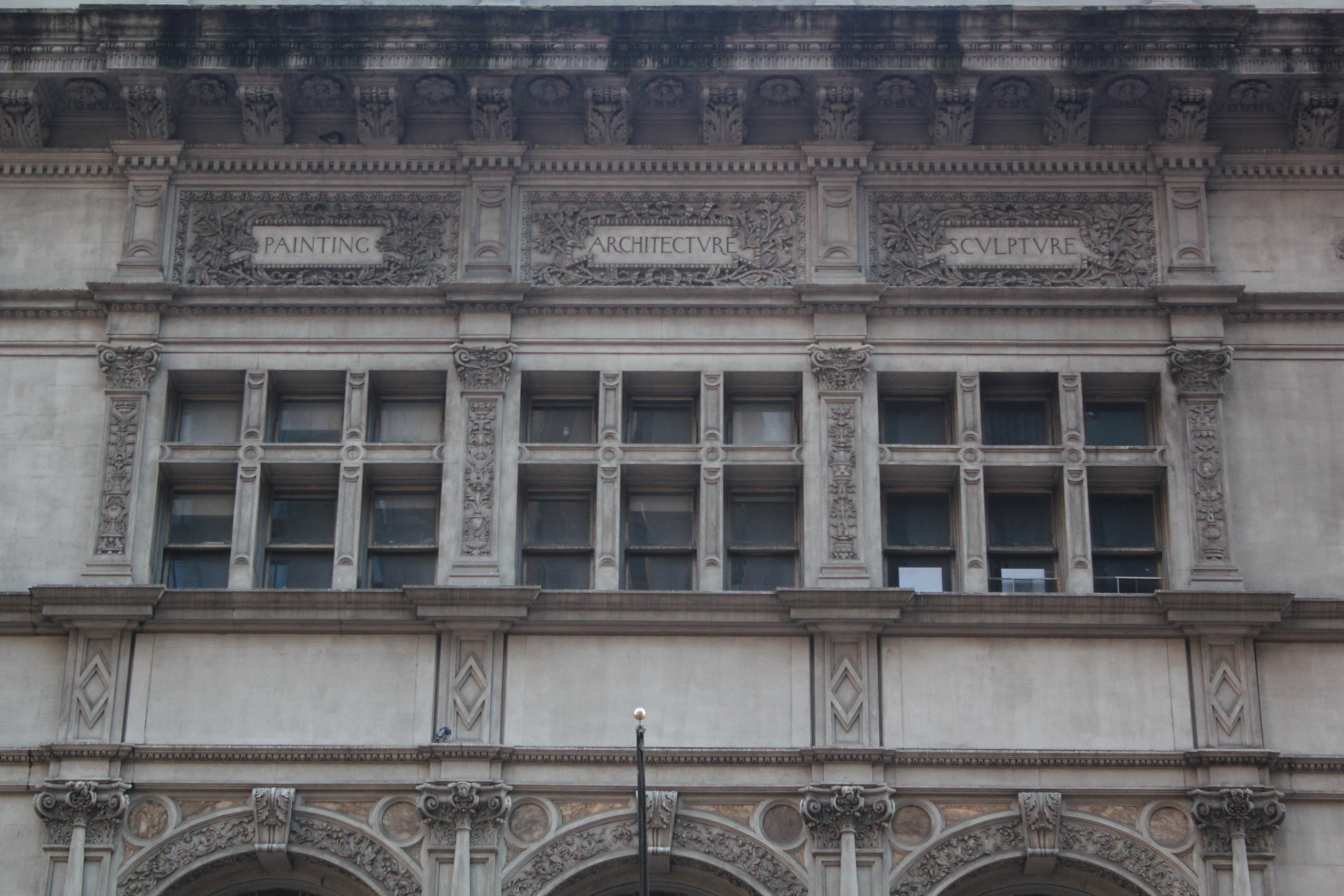
Arches on third floor

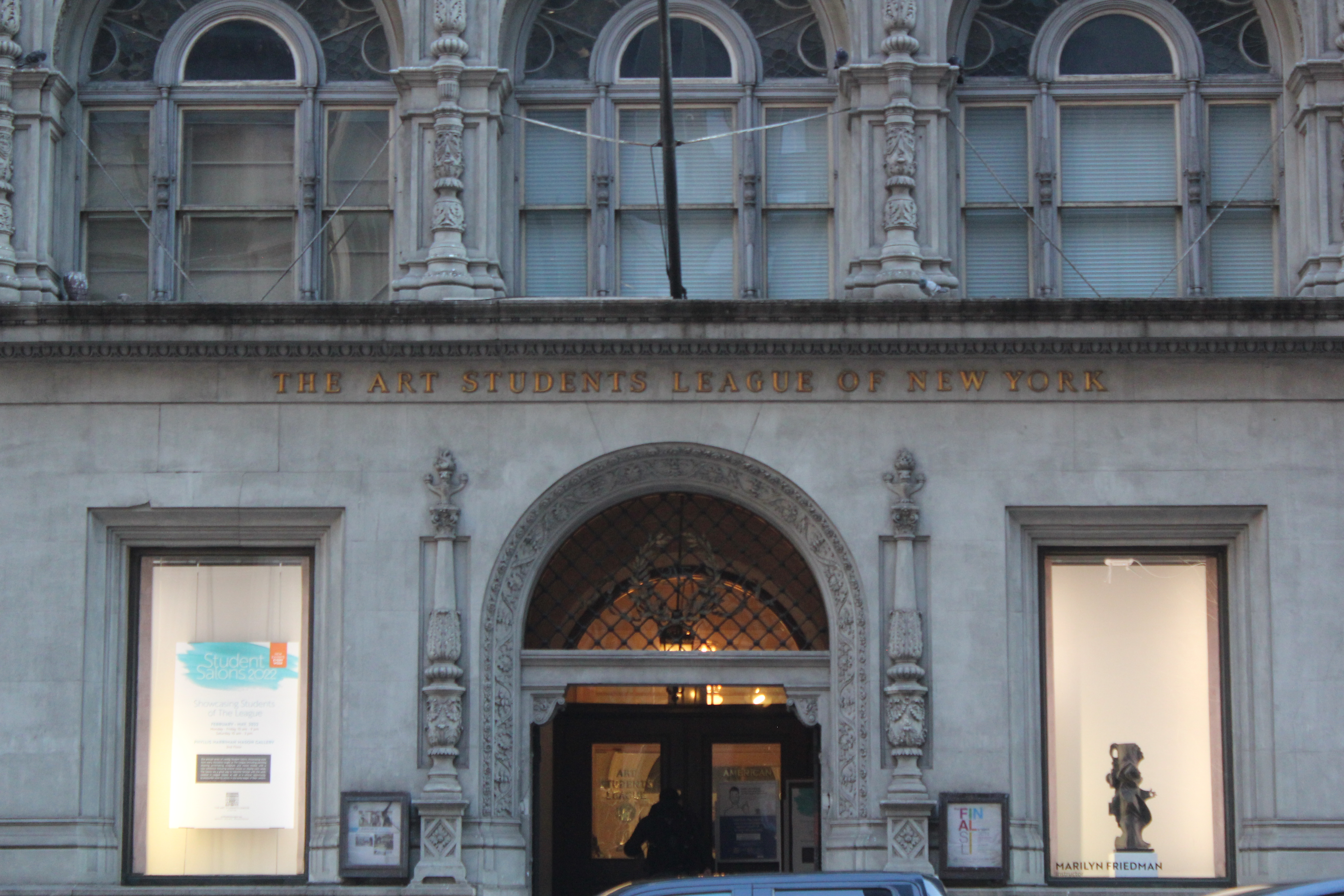
Entrance

The facade on 57th Street is made of limestone. A small cornice runs above the ground story, while horizontal band courses run above the second and third stories. The main entrance is an ornate archway at the center of the ground story, which is flanked with stone balusters resembling candelabras. Three rectangular windows run along a sill on either side of the main entrance. At the second story, the three center windows are ornately decorated arches flanked by sculpted colonettes, while the two outer windows are small rectangular openings with ornate gables. At the third story, the three center windows contain stone mullion and transom bars, while the two outer windows are small rectangular windows with gables. There are three plaques in the band course directly above the center window openings, with the words "Painting", "Architecture", and "Sculpture". A large cornice and a balustrade run above the third-story band course. The top stories on 57th Street are hidden under the building's roof.

The annex on 58th Street measures 75 by 40 feet (23 by 12 m) across. The Art Students League Building is set back from the 58th Street sidewalk. At ground level, there are slanted skylights between the 58th Street facade and the sidewalk, with a wrought-iron fence running along the sidewalk. The ground story of the 58th Street facade is made of buff-colored brick. There are entrance arches with ornate square porches on the extreme ends of this facade. The second and third stories are constructed in dark brick and contain blind double-height arches filled in with brick. The third story of the 58th Street facade is topped by a buff brick cornice with a corbel.

=== Interior ===
The entrance foyer has mosaic-tile floors, decorative oak-wood elements, architrave moldings, and transom windows with stained glass. As designed, the ground story was bisected by a hallway 12 feet (3.7 m) wide. There was space for the Society of American Architects to the right of the hallway, while the Art Students League and a staircase and elevator were to the left of the hallway. The Architectural League occupied the second floor, with a 100-seat lecture room, an art library, and a reading and committee room. The Art Students League used the rear of the second and third floor as classrooms, while the front portion of the third floor was used by the Art Students League's library and meeting room. The fourth story contained studios for the Art Students League, which were lit only by skylights. The fourth story was brightly lit by sunlight from the north, for the benefit of the artists working there, a consideration that impacted the selection of the AFAS building's site. The basement contained a supper room and the sculpture department. In the rear of the first floor was the Vanderbilt Gallery, a two-story annex built on a 75-by-58-foot (23 by 18 m) site, with a skylighted gallery based on the Georges Petit Gallery in Paris.

As of 2018, an art-supply store occupies part of the ground floor. There is a fireplace with a large mantel in the second-floor gallery, which was created in the former lecture room space after World War II. The interior also contains two "half-floors" above the second and fourth stories. Many of the classrooms retain old furniture and designs from the early and mid-20th century. The New York Times wrote in 2014 that "Late-20th-century technology is not present, to say nothing of early 21st-century gadgets." The interior spaces are designed to accommodate the atelier system that the Art Students League uses for its classes, in which teachers devise their own curriculums.

== History ==
=== Founding and construction ===
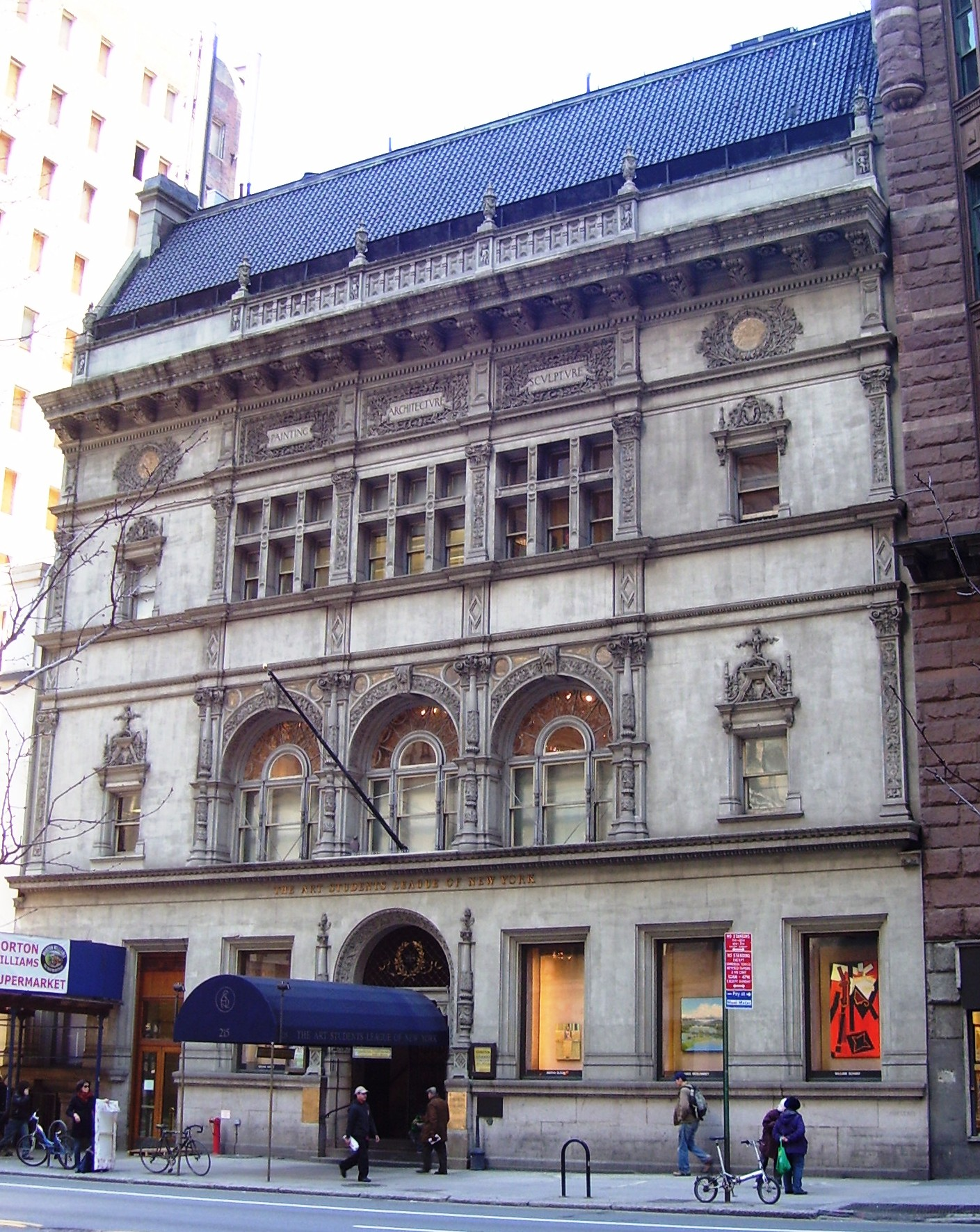
Seen in 2011

The American Fine Arts Society was incorporated in June 1889 by Howard Russell Butler, Louis C. Tiffany, Daniel C. French, Henry J. Hardenbergh, Edward H. Kendall, Frederic Crowninshield, Charles R. Lamb, Charles Broughton, Horace Bradley, Edwin Blashfield, Francis Jones, Chester Loomis, and J. Harrison Mills. The AFAS had been founded specifically to construct a building for the joint use of the artistic societies under its purview, and the idea for the building had been proposed specifically by Butler. The building had a construction budget of $200,000 (equivalent to $7,166,667 in 2025), to be funded through the sale of $50,000 in capital stock and the issuance of bonds. Some $20,000 in stock was to be raised through the Life Fellowship Fund, in which donors who contributed over $100 (equivalent to $3,583 in 2025) could be made "life fellows" of the AFAS. Life fellows were invited to all of the AFAS's private events and vote on management matters, and they also received five tickets to each show at the building.

The AFAS's officers initially anticipated constructing the building on a lot along 43rd Street. By October 1889, over two hundred life fellowships had been distributed. The AFAS purchased several lots on 57th Street, just west of Seventh Avenue, in May 1890. By the following month, the AFAS had $30,000 on hand. Upon acquiring the land, the AFAS commenced an architectural design competition for the building's design. (Note: Sources variously state that 31, 38, or 39 architects participated in the competition.) There were 31 entries for the competition, including two from Wilson Eyre and one each from H. Langford Warren (Note: Namesake of the H. Langford Warren House in Massachusetts) and Babb, Cook & Willard. A jury, composed of Russell Sturgis, Daniel Chester French, and Henry Gurdon Marquand, was appointed to review the submissions. Although the original deadline for the plans was September 1890, the jury members could not agree on finalist candidates and William Morris Hunt joined the jury to break the impasse. The competition was narrowed to three finalists in November, and a tribunal selected Hardenbergh as architect the next month, along with Walter C. Hunting and John C. Jacobsen. At the time, the rear section facing 58th Street was planned to be built later.

Art collector George Washington Vanderbilt II, one of several major donors to the building's gift fund, bought the 75-by-58-foot (23 by 18 m) plot behind the AFAS to build his private Vanderbilt Gallery. By May 1891, construction of the AFAS building's foundation had begun. The AFAS had nearly completed fundraising, but needed to raise $50,000 for a gift fund for the building's maintenance. To fund construction, Vanderbilt agreed to extend the AFAS a $100,000 loan. Foundation work did not begin until that November. The cornerstone of the AFAS building was laid on February 8, 1892, with a celebration held at Carnegie Hall. The AFAS building was nearly completed by October, when members of the AFAS's constituent organizations began moving in. The building officially opened on December 3, 1892. Three weeks after the building's opening, Vanderbilt gifted the AFAS his private gallery, which had cost $100,000; this effectively forgave Vanderbilt's loan to the AFAS. The Vanderbilt Gallery opened on February 13, 1893. Butler said of the gallery, "No gift ever did so much for the art of this community."

=== 1890s through 1930s ===
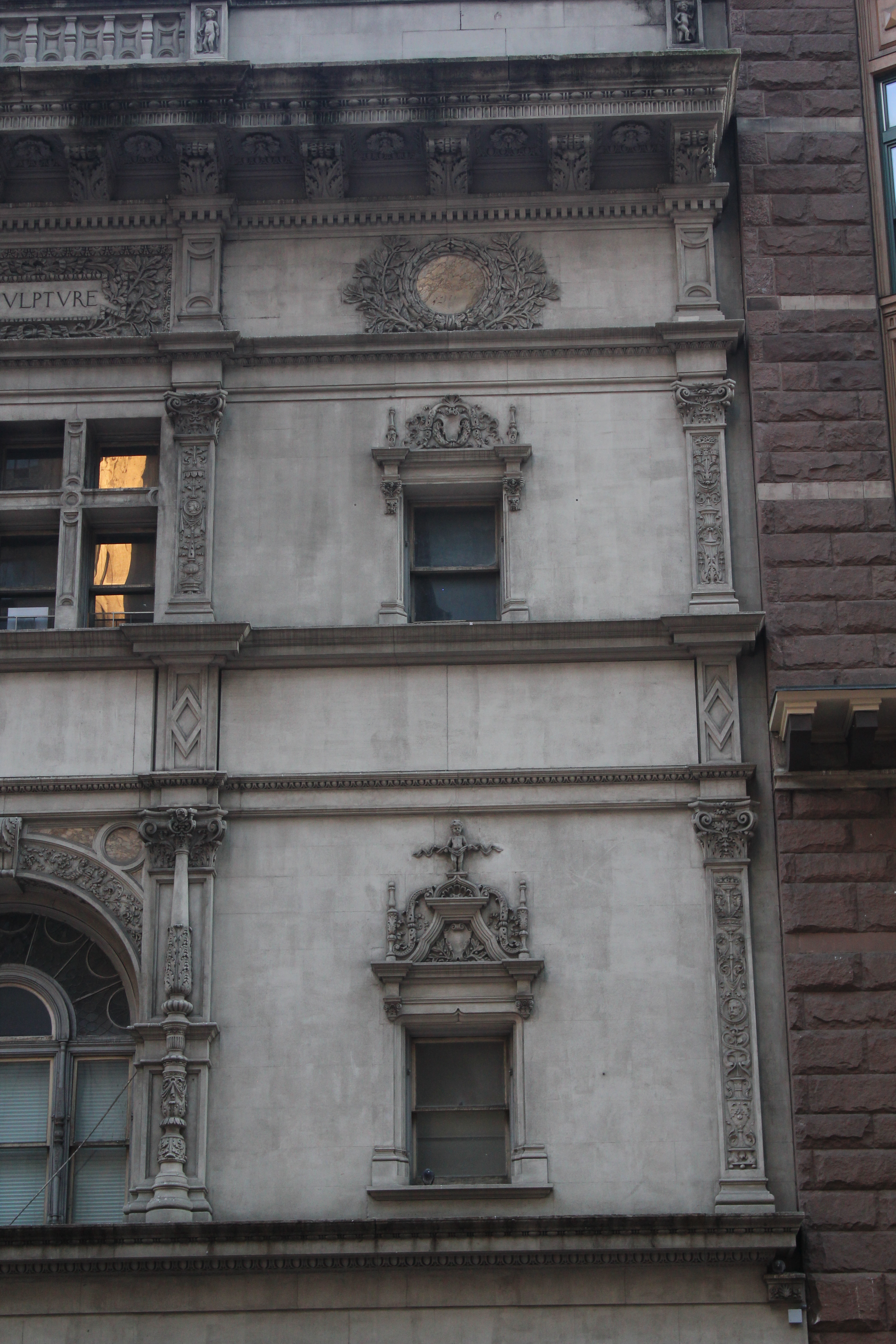
Side bay

According to architectural writer Robert A. M. Stern, the AFAS quickly "became the scene of virtually every important exhibition of art and architecture held in the city" during New York's "Composite Era", spanning from 1890 to 1915. The AFAS frequently hosted shows in the building's Vanderbilt Gallery. During the building's first full year of operation in 1893, it held two loan exhibitions: a set of bronzes created by Antoine-Louis Barye, and Louis R. Ehrich's collection of paintings from old Dutch and Flemish painters. The next year, the AFAS hosted several exhibitions, including a show featuring pictures sent to the World's Columbian Exposition from Sweden, Norway, and Holland, as well as a collection of George Inness paintings. The building was so popular that the Art Students League had to rent alternate spaces. The AFAS was classified as a tax exempt organization in 1895. Other exhibitions in the building's first two decades included a show of Japanese paintings and color prints in 1896, the National Academy of Design's 75th-anniversary exhibition in 1889–1900, and a comparative exhibit of 200 works from American and European artists in 1904. The Vanderbilt Gallery also exhibited decorations that were slated to be installed in other buildings, including Blashfield's mural for the old Waldorf-Astoria Hotel and Charles Yardley Turner's frieze for the same hotel.

The Art Students League took up the most space at the AFAS building and became the most closely associated with the structure. The original roof, made of red tile, was destroyed in May 1901 when decorations for a costume dance caught fire on the fourth floor. The Art Students League moved its classes to the first floor while the roof was being repaired. Christian Buchheit was hired in 1905 as the building's superintendent, a role in which he served until 1971, overseeing much of the building's maintenance, including the construction of a staircase. The Art Students League subsequently made him an honorary member, the first non-artist to receive that award. In 1906, the Society of American Artists' first-floor space was given to the National Academy of Design after their merger. The next year, a "Second Gallery" was created by merging the Central, East, and West galleries. The National Academy of Design contemplated constructing an annex to the AFAS building in 1913, after it unsuccessfully proposed an art exhibition palace in the nearby Central Park.

On January 30, 1920, the AFAS building was severely damaged by a fire and the original Vanderbilt Gallery was destroyed. The loss was estimated at $1 million, of which half was the cost of the destroyed art. Despite this, the AFAS was able to repair the building and the rebuilt galleries opened in March 1921. During the following two years, as a result of the widening of 57th Street, the AFAS rebuilt the building's main entrance and the adjoining sidewalk and erected a new underground boiler room. By 1925, the building housed the headquarters of several artistic organizations in addition to the Architectural League, Art Students League, and National Academy of Design. The Architectural League moved to a new clubhouse at 115 East 40th Street in December 1927, although it retained shares in the AFAS. Events held at the AFAS building in the 1920s and 1930s included the fledgling Museum of the City of New York's Old New York exhibit in 1926; Metropolitan Museum of Art president Robert W. DeForest's 80th-birthday celebration in 1928; and an exhibition of 351 prints from the Oval Table Society in 1936.

=== 1940s through 1990s ===
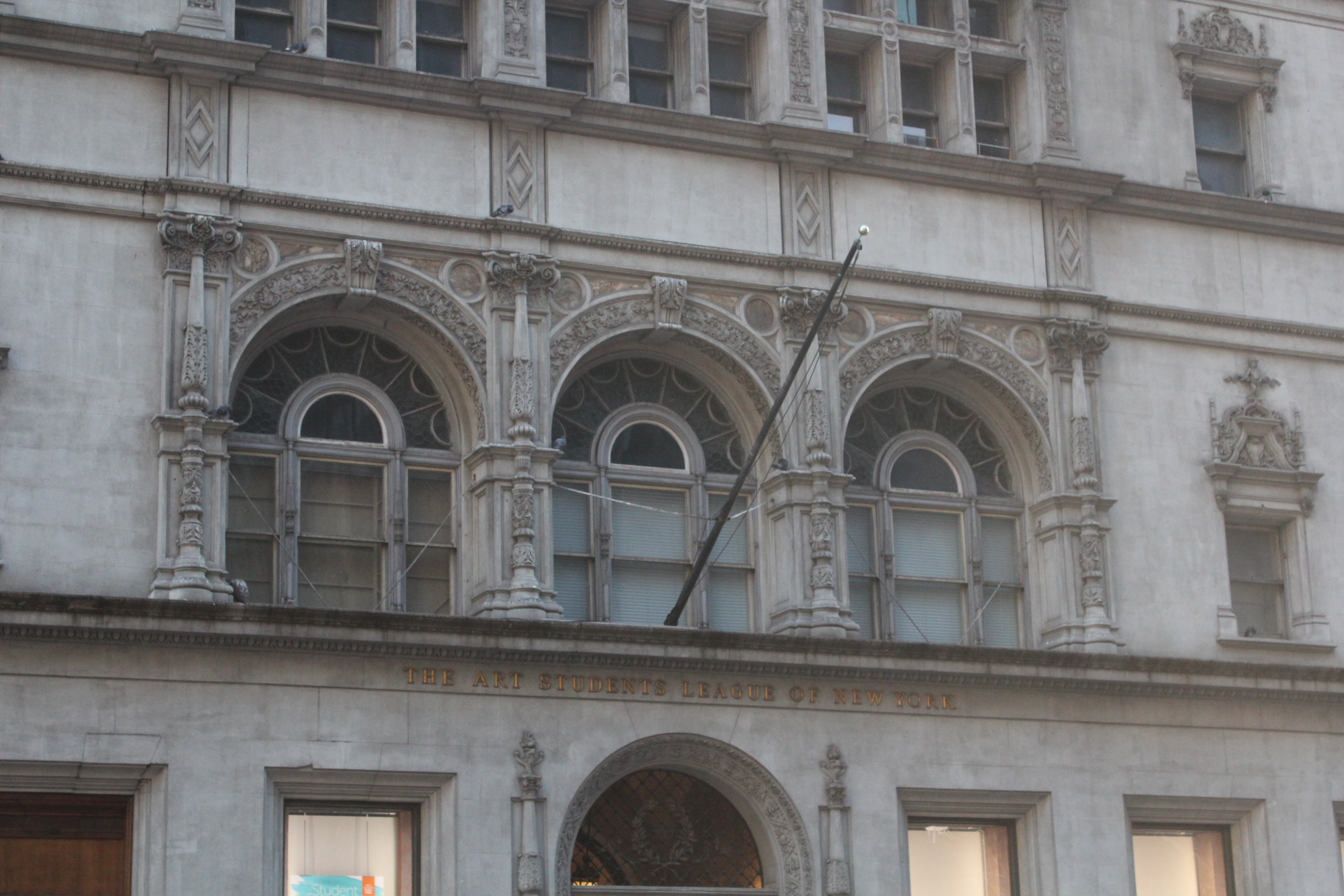
Arches on second floor

The National Academy of Design moved to a new headquarters at 1083 Fifth Avenue in December 1941. The Art Students League bought out the other organizations' stakes shortly afterward, becoming the building's sole occupant. The Architectural League sued the Art Students League and National Academy of Design in early 1942, alleging that the two organizations had defrauded the AFAS when the National Academy had sold its stock to the Art Students League at a greatly reduced value. The Art Students League, colloquially called "the League" by then, narrowly avoided closing in 1943, in the midst of decreased enrollment to World War II. Upon the war's end, the G.I. Bill enabled returning veterans to attend classes at the League. One of the building's last exhibitions was an exhibit of soldiers' art in April 1945, and the Vanderbilt Gallery was converted into studios shortly afterward to accommodate the number of new students. The second-floor lecture room became a private gallery for the League.

The Art Students League continued to perform renovations, installing its name in brass letters over the building's entrance in 1950. The same year, the League held fundraisers to pay for an addition to the building. The work would cost $500,000 and would add a fifth floor, alleviating crowding in its classrooms and studios, which were described by former League president John Sloan as "bursting at the seams". At the end of that decade, the Art Students League replaced its ornamental iron stairway with two elevators and merged two studios on the fifth floor. The New York City Landmarks Preservation Commission designated the Art Students League Building as a New York City landmark on December 10, 1968, and the building was added to the National Register of Historic Places on May 6, 1980.

The Art Students League created a fund for building renovations and improvements in 1974 and restored the building's rear entrances in 1983. The Russell and Janet Doubleday Fund, as well as the Gladys & Roland Harriman Foundation, donated extra money to the building fund in 1987. The League discovered sixty paintings in the basement in 1994, which had been created between 1891 and 1914 as "faux masterpieces" parodying popular artists' works; the paintings had not been touched in eight decades. When the League removed asbestos from the building during 1996, its summer classes were moved to Carnegie Hall.

=== 21st century ===
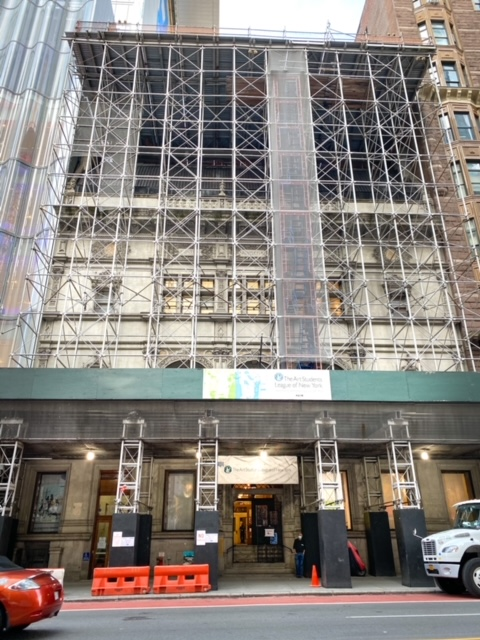
Seen in 2020 during the construction of Central Park Tower

In early 2003, the Art Students League started a three-phase renovation of its building. The renovations were designed by Kossar & Garry Architects and included the renovation of structural and mechanical systems, the restoration of the Vanderbilt Gallery, and the construction of new gallery space in the middle of the building site. The structural and mechanical renovations were finished by the end of 2003. Also during the renovation, the building was cleared out and the basement's sculpture department was expanded. The gallery on the second floor was named for Phyllis Harriman Mason.

In early 2006, the Art Students League sold 136,000 square feet (12,600 m^{2}) of development rights above 215 West 57th Street to the Extell Development Company, which paid $23.1 million. Extell paid the Art Students League $31.8 million in exchange for another 6,000 square feet (560 m^{2}) of air rights in 2013. The air rights sales increased the maximum possible floor area for Extell's Central Park Tower, which contains a cantilever projecting 28 feet (8.5 m) over the Art Students League Building's lot, starting about 300 feet (91 m) above ground. According to Art Students League leadership, the air rights sale was a one-time opportunity that would enable the League to expand and renovate its building.

The approval of the cantilever above the Art Students League Building was controversial. Although Manhattan Community Board 5 voted against allowing the cantilever in an advisory vote in October 2013, the Landmarks Preservation Commission approved the air rights sale and cantilever several weeks later. In February 2014, Art Students League members voted 1,342–227 in favor of the deal. A subsequent lawsuit from over 100 League members against Extell and the League's leadership, attempting to stop the air rights sale, was dismissed in mid-2014. Three hundred League members sued the League's leadership in January 2016, claiming that if abstentions from the vote were counted as "no" votes, the tally should have been 2,603–1,342 against the air rights sale. The second lawsuit was dismissed through summary judgment, and an appeals court upheld the decision in March 2016, when the tower's construction was already underway.

A temporary construction shed was erected around the Art Students League Building during the tower's construction. In 2018, the Art Students League held a "house party" in the building, marking the first time in 75 years that the building had been opened to the general public. The construction shed remained until 2021, when work on Central Park Tower was completed.

== Critical reception ==
The design of the Art Students League building was initially not well received; one critic said that the facade was "commonplace...and quite unattractive". Architect H. Langford Warren wrote in 1893 that the Art Students League Building was a "charming building which we are glad to see in the dreary streets of New York", despite the fact that the facade was almost identical in design to Francis I's hunting lodge on Paris's Cours-la-Reine.

After the building was completed, it quickly became an established architectural feature on 57th Street. In 1897, the Real Estate Record and Guide lauded the American Society of Civil Engineers' Society House, across the street at 220 West 57th Street, for complementing the American Fine Arts Society. Hardenbergh, in a 1906 interview, characterized the design as "a work of love". The New York Times, a century later, called the facade "a perfect ornamental fit" to the Art Students League. John Tauranac wrote in his book Elegant New York that the building's design was more akin to a "side-street clubhouse or mansion than art gallery and school".

== See also ==
- List of New York City Designated Landmarks in Manhattan from 14th to 59th Streets
- National Register of Historic Places listings in Manhattan from 14th to 59th Streets
