= Central Park Tower =

Residential skyscraper in Manhattan, New York

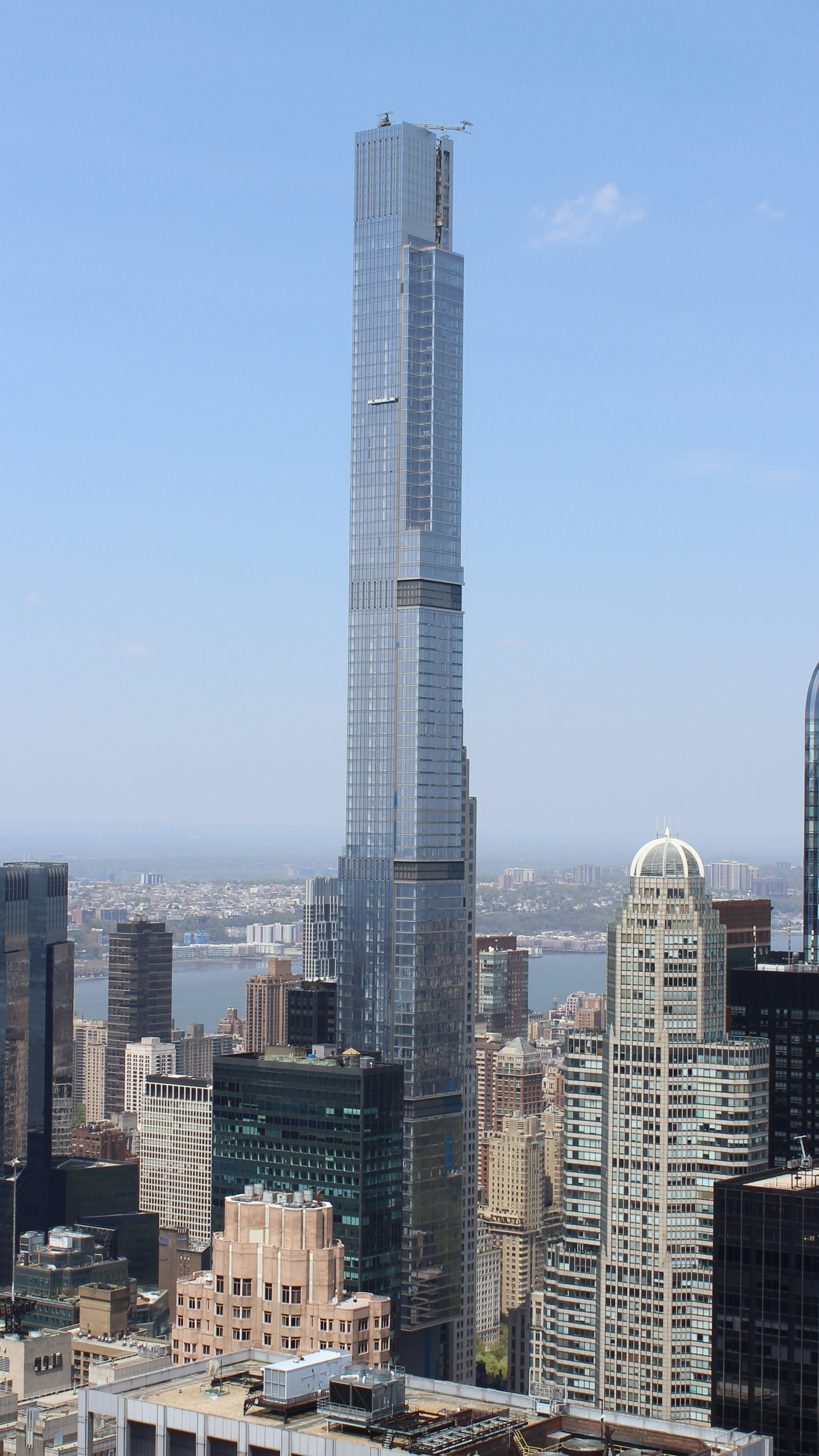
- Central Park Tower in April 2021

General information
- Status: Completed
- Type: Residential, retail
- Architectural style: Modern
- Location: 217 West 57th Street, Manhattan, New York City, United States
- Coordinates: 40°45′59″N 73°58′51″W
- Construction started: September 17, 2014
- Topped-out: September 17, 2019
- Completed: 2020; 6 years ago
- Cost: $3 billion

Height
- Architectural: 1,550 ft (472.4 m)
- Roof: 1,550 ft (472.4 m)
- Top floor: 1,417 ft (431.9 m)

Technical details
- Floor count: 98 (Note: The highest story below the roof is the 98th story above ground, which is numbered 136.)
- Floor area: 1,285,308 square feet (119,409.0 m^{2})
- Lifts/elevators: 11

Design and construction
- Architects: Adrian Smith + Gordon Gill Architecture, AAI Architects, P.C. (as architect of record)
- Developer: Extell Development Company
- Structural engineer: WSP Global
- Civil engineer: Langan
- Main contractor: Lendlease

Website
- centralparktower.com

New York City Landmark
- Designated: November 10, 2009
- Reference no.: 2380
- Designated entity: B. F. Goodrich Company Building

Central Park Tower is a residential supertall skyscraper at 217 West 57th Street, along Billionaires' Row, in the Midtown Manhattan neighborhood of New York City, New York, United States. Designed by Adrian Smith + Gordon Gill Architecture, the building rises 1,550 feet (472.4 m) with 98 above-ground stories and three basement stories, although the top story is numbered 136. Central Park Tower is the second-tallest building in New York City (behind One World Trade Center), the United States, and the Western Hemisphere; the 15th tallest building in the world; the tallest primarily residential building in the world; and the tallest building outside Asia by roof height.

Central Park Tower was developed by Extell Development Company and Shanghai Municipal Investment Group. The basement and first five above-ground stories contain a large Nordstrom store, which opened in 2019. The eastern portion of the tower contains a cantilever above the Art Students League of New York's building at 215 West 57th Street, intended to maximize views of nearby Central Park. The residential portion of the tower contains 179 condominiums, spanning on average 5,000 ft^{2} (460 m^{2}), with interiors designed by Rottet Studio. There are also amenities spaces on floors 14 through 16 as well as a private club on floor 100.

The site of Central Park Tower was assembled during the first decade of the 21st century; during the acquisition process, the tower was delayed after two buildings at 225 West 57th Street and 1780 Broadway were considered for New York City landmark status. Despite uncertainty about the final design and complications relating to financing, excavations at the site started in May 2014 and above-ground construction started in early 2015. There were several incidents and controversies during the building's construction, including a controversy over the tower's cantilever and the death of a security guard. The building was topped out during September 2019, and completed in 2020. In total, Central Park Tower cost $3 billion to construct.

== Site ==
Central Park Tower is in the Midtown Manhattan neighborhood of New York City, United States. It is on the east side of Broadway between 57th Street to the south and 58th Street to the north. It is one block south of Central Park and Columbus Circle. The northwestern corner of the building abuts 1790 Broadway, while the southwestern corner is adjacent to 1776 Broadway. Central Park Tower is also near 240 Central Park South and 220 Central Park South to the north; the American Fine Arts Society (also known as the Art Students League of New York building) and the Osborne apartment building to the east; and 224 West 57th Street and 218 West 57th Street (the former American Society of Civil Engineers clubhouse) to the south.

Central Park Tower is one of several major developments around 57th Street and Central Park that are collectively dubbed Billionaires' Row by the media. Other buildings along Billionaires' Row include 432 Park Avenue four blocks east, 111 West 57th Street and One57 one block east, and the adjacent 220 Central Park South.

=== Former buildings ===
In the 20th century, the area was part of Manhattan's "Automobile Row", a stretch of Broadway extending mainly between Times Square at 42nd Street and Sherman Square at 72nd Street. Before the first decade of the 20th century, the area was occupied mostly by horse-related industries and was described by The New York Times as "thoroughly lifeless". By 1907, the Times characterized this section of Broadway as having "almost a solid line of motor vehicle signs all the way from Times Square to Sherman Square". In the late 1900s and early 1910s, several large automobile showrooms, stores, and garages were built on Broadway, including the United States Rubber Company building at 5 Columbus Circle and the Demarest and Peerless Company showrooms at 224 West 57th Street.

On the western side of the building's base is the 12-story facade of the former 1780 Broadway, which formerly contained the B. F. Goodrich Company showroom. There was also an 8-story building at 225 West 57th Street, which contained the Stoddard-Dayton showroom. Both structures were built in 1909 to designs by Howard Van Doren Shaw in collaboration with the Manhattan firm of Waid and Willauer. The two buildings shared a freight elevator. 1780 Broadway was one of the most visible buildings on Automobile Row because of the site's elevated topography, and it was leased to various automotive firms during the early 20th century. Goodrich came to own both 1780 Broadway and 225 West 57th Street; when the company sold the structures in 1928, they were collectively called the "Goodrich Building". A single-story annex was built for the Lincoln Art Theatre in 1962–1964, and the Goodrich Building became a supermarket in the 1990s before being acquired by Central Park Tower's developer, the Extell Development Company, in 2006. In addition, the Hard Rock Cafe and Broadway Dance Center occupied the structure at 221 West 57th Street before that building was purchased by Extell, also in 2006.

== Architecture ==
Central Park Tower was developed jointly by Extell and Shanghai Municipal Investment Group. It was designed by Adrian Smith + Gordon Gill Architecture, with AAI Architects as the architect of record. WSP Global was the structural engineer for the project, while Lendlease was the main contractor.

The building has 98 physical above-ground floors and three basement levels. The top story is numbered 136, and several floor numbers are skipped. (Note: Extell classifies the true number of stories above ground as "construction floors", which are labeled with a different "marketing floor" number. Numbering is as follows: Ground (1st) through 7th stories (retail) – floors 1 through 7; 8th through 10th stories (residential amenities) – floors 14 through 16; Mezzanines above 10th story – floors 17 and 18; 11th and 12th stories – floors 19 and 20; 13th through 20th stories – floors 32 through 39; 21st story – floor 43; 22nd through 27th stories – floors 45 through 50; 28th through 46th stories – floors 53 through 71; 47th through 67th stories – floors 77 through 97; Mezzanine above 67th story – floor 98; 68th story (residential amenities) – floor 100; 69th through 98th stories – floors 107 through 136; The roof is labeled as floor 137 in internal documents but is not a physical story.) The tallest habitable story is 1,417 feet (432 m) high, while the roof and architectural tip are 1,550 feet (470 m) above ground level. The use of development rights transferred from other structures nearby, as well as about 300 feet (91 m) of mechanical spaces, enabled Central Park Tower to reach a taller height than would have ordinarily been allowed. Central Park Tower is the tallest primarily residential building in the world; the much taller Burj Khalifa has 900 residential units but is mixed-use. Central Park Tower is also the second-tallest skyscraper in the United States and the Western Hemisphere, the 15th-tallest building in the world, and the tallest building outside Asia by roof height. The building's top floor and roof height are higher than that of One World Trade Center in Lower Manhattan. Due to its high slenderness ratio, the building has been characterized as part of a new breed of New York City "pencil towers".

=== Form and facade ===
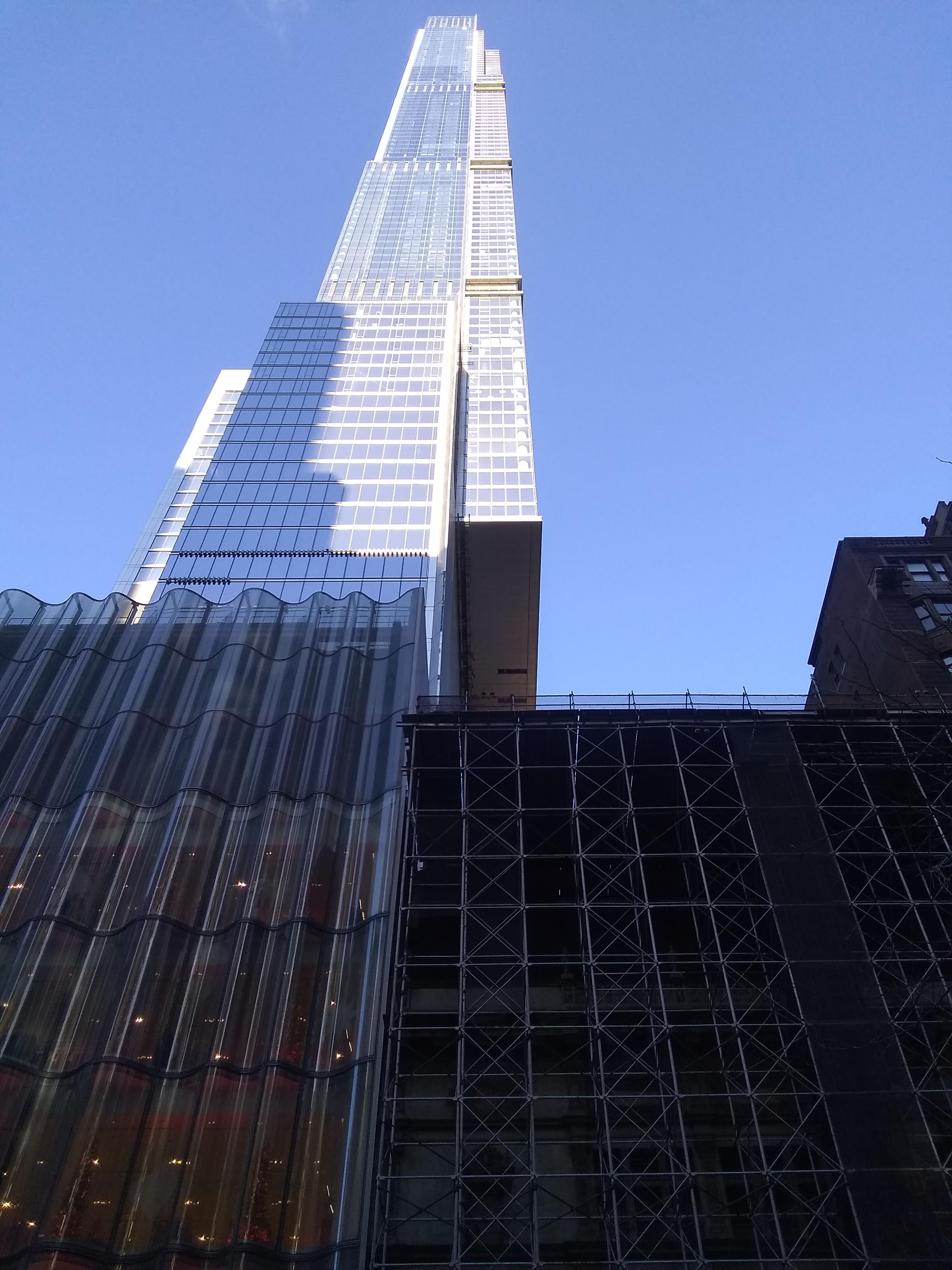
Cantilever over the American Fine Arts Society, headquarters of the Art Students League of New York

The facade of Central Park Tower was designed by James Carpenter Design Associates, in partnership with facade contractor Permasteelisa Group. According to Gill and Smith, the glass cladding was intended to help the tower fit into the skyline. The entrance for Nordstrom is on 57th Street, as is the main residential entrance. A secondary residents' entrance is on 58th Street. The upper stories are set back from the base.

To maximize residents' views of Central Park, Extell built a cantilever extending 28 feet (8.5 m) (Note: One source gives a figure of 30 feet (9.1 m).) from the eastern side of the tower, set back 80 feet (24 m) from the street. The cantilever starts roughly 290 feet (88 m) above the Art Students League building and covers roughly one-third of the total space above that building. Without the cantilever, Vornado Realty Trust's 220 Central Park South (immediately to the north) would have blocked the lowest 950 feet (290 m) of the tower. The Art Students League building itself could not be modified because it was a New York City designated landmark and listed on the National Register of Historic Places. The cantilever was constructed in conjunction with an air rights sale in 2013, which shifted 220 Central Park South slightly west. This agreement, in turn, ended a years-long dispute over the site of 220 Central Park South. Since 2019, Central Park Tower has held the Guinness World Record for being the tallest cantilevered building. The critic Justin Davidson wrote that, because of the cantilever and the retail podium, the building gave the appearance of several buildings in one.

==== Main structure ====
The base of the tower along 57th and 58th Streets is made of glass, arranged into fluted panels that are insulated and laminated. The panels are installed in a serpentine "wave" pattern. These glass panels have a total combined surface area of 52,700 square feet (4,900 m^{2}). The panels are set within aluminum frames and locked together with steel plates, fitting between the concrete floor slabs on each level.

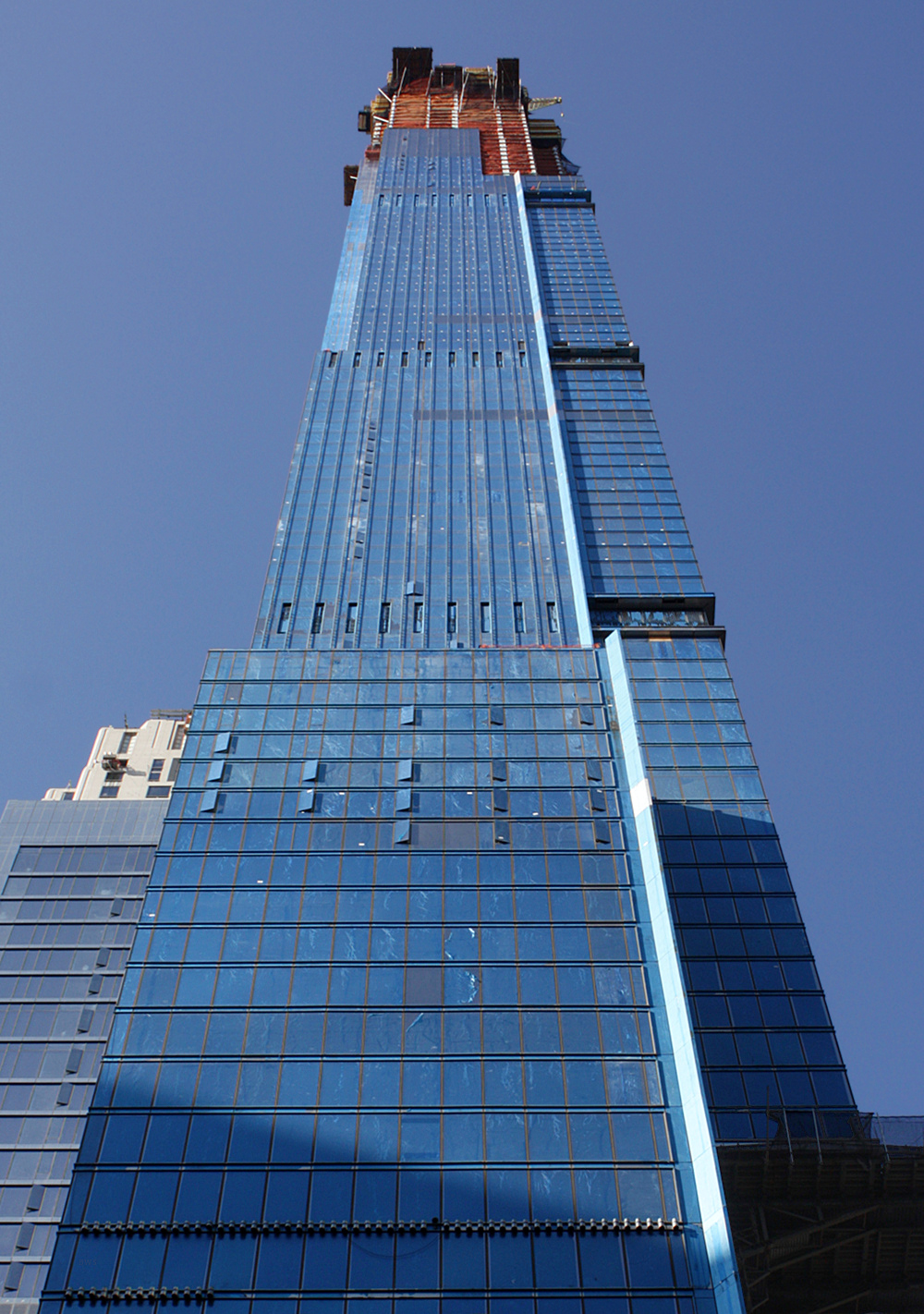
Main facade as seen in 2019

The facade for the upper stories is mostly a curtain wall made of aluminum and glass. Over 10 million pounds (4.5 kt) of these materials were used in the facade. According to Permasteelisa, 610,300 square feet (56,700 m^{2}) of glass curtain wall is used on the upper floors. The magazine Informed Infrastructure states that 620,000 square feet (58,000 m^{2}) of glass is used on the facade, comprising over 12,000 panels. Each of the panels measures, on average, 12 feet (3.7 m) tall and 5 feet (1.5 m) across. The residential stories have casement windows, within the curtain wall, that can swing up to 4 inches (100 mm) outward. In addition, some condominium units have motorized windows at least seven feet (2.1 m) above the floor. For the eastern facade, which cantilevers over the Art Students League building, a zinc facade was installed to reduce reflections of sunlight onto nearby buildings. Zinc was chosen because it would eventually degrade into a matte finish.

The spandrels between each floor are clad with stainless steel. The curtain wall is subdivided vertically by stainless steel "fins" that are arranged similarly to pinstripes; they resemble mullions but do not project from the facade. The fins were originally designed as oblong ovals, but they were rotated after the contractors conducted simulations and determined that rotated ovals would be better suited for preventing snow accumulation. There are fewer fins on upper stories but, at several places on the facade, tall narrow bands wrap around the building, with the bands on upper stories being progressively larger.

For maintenance of the upper stories' facade, there are six "building maintenance units" on the roof. The facade underneath the cantilever on the building's eastern side, as well as the underside of the cantilever, is maintained by a cart that runs along a monorail under the cantilever. The top of the tower contains narrow, tall slats with vertical strips of lighting. According to Adrian Smith, one of the building's architects, the slats were meant to be "subtle, not garish".

==== 1780 Broadway ====
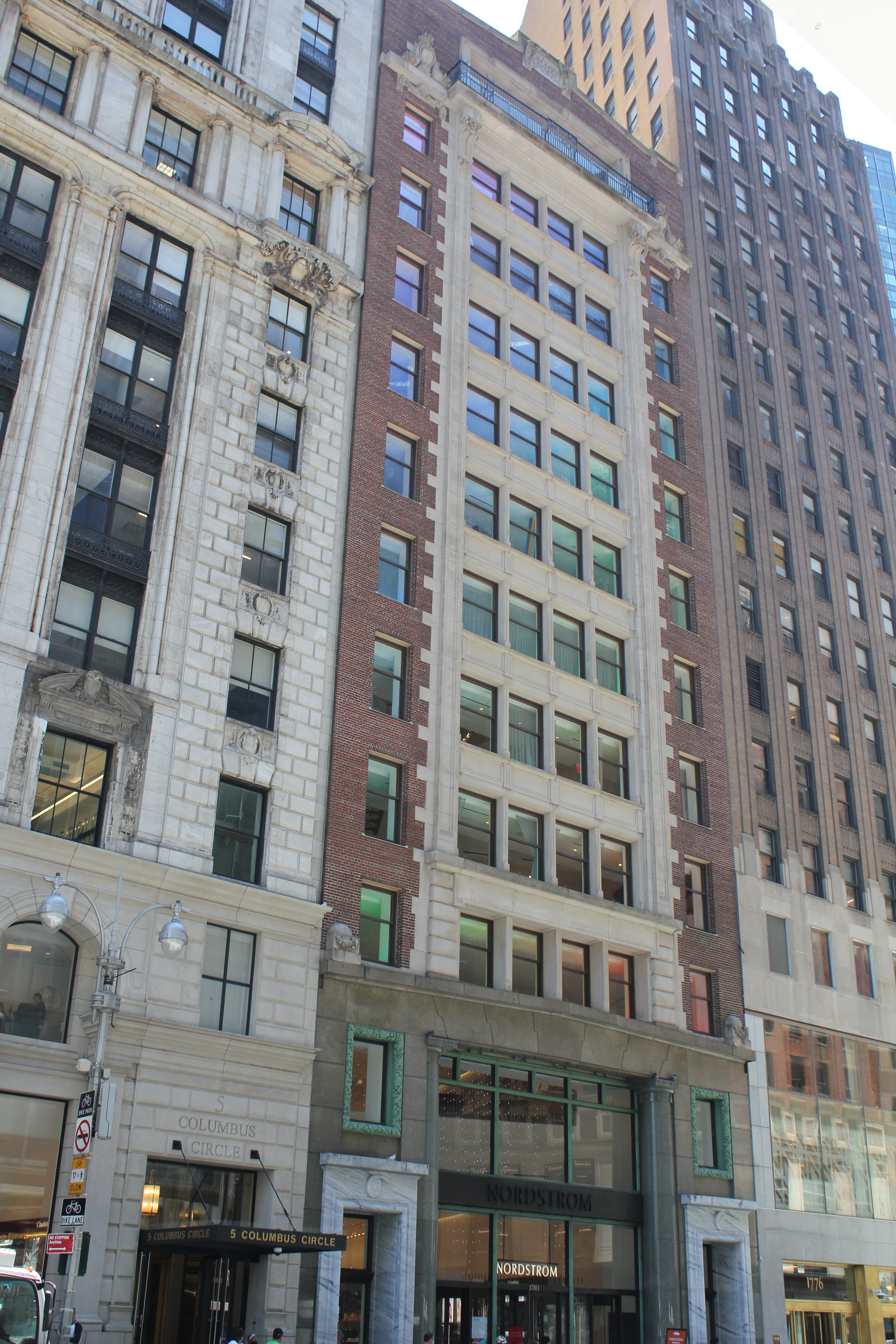
The facade of 1780 Broadway (center), a New York City designated landmark preserved at Central Park Tower's base

The facade of the B. F. Goodrich Building at 1780 Broadway, dating to 1909, is a New York City designated landmark and is preserved at the base of the tower on Broadway. It was restored as part of the construction of Central Park Tower. The landmark facade, largely composed of brick and limestone, consists of one bay of windows on either side of a wide central bay. 1780 Broadway was initially 12 stories tall, but it corresponds to eight physical stories within the base of Central Park Tower.

The lowest two floors of 1780 Broadway are clad with granite and topped by a granite cornice, which has a peak at its center. Two storefronts were added at ground level in the 20th century and, at some point before 1979, light-toned granite was added to the ground floor. In the late 2010s, marble doorways were added to the ground story. The central window opening of the second floor is flanked by granite columns, while the outer bays contain trimmed rectangular window frames with carved bands. On each of the third through 11th floors, the central bay contains four windows within a granite frame, with a brick surround and a single window on either side. There is a small cornice above the central bay on the third floor and a sill above the 11th floor of the landmark facade. The 12th floor is clad with brick and contains a decorative balcony in the central bay.

=== Structural features ===
Central Park Tower stands on hard bedrock. The foundation consists of reinforced concrete mats as well as spread footings and strip footings. Some parts of the foundation are anchored to the bedrock. Over 75,000 cubic feet (2,100 m^{3}) of rock was excavated to pour the concrete mat, which is 8 feet (2.4 m) thick. The substructure for the three basement levels is built of reinforced concrete as well as composite steel and concrete.

The superstructure is made of reinforced concrete along with a grid of structural steel. The first 12 above-ground stories (comprising floors 1 through 20) contain a reinforced-concrete and composite steel-and-concrete superstructure. Above the thirteenth physical story (floor 32), the superstructure is made of reinforced concrete which is cast in place. Residential and mechanical stories are separated by concrete slabs with a minimum thickness of 9 inches (230 mm). The roof consists of a concrete panel 4 feet (1.2 m) thick. Atop the building is a weighting system to balance the building against the wind. The weighting system consists of two suspended tuned mass dampers.

The tower contains a concrete structural core, which is positioned near the eastern end of the site to accommodate the cantilevered upper stories and create larger floor plates for the Nordstrom store in the base. To create the core, metal formwork was assembled above the eighth floor and lifted to upper floors by crane, where concrete was poured into the formwork to a thickness of 5 feet (1.5 m). While the superstructure on the first 83 stories was constructed with electronic assistance, the superstructure for the top 16 stories was erected entirely manually. At intervals of 20 physical stories, shear walls connect the core to concrete walls surrounding the tower. Additionally, steel columns and beams transfer loads from these shear walls into the bedrock. On higher stories, the corners contain setbacks and notches that also deflect wind loads. The cantilever on the building's eastern side is not structurally supported from beneath, so large shear walls extend east-west between the cantilever.

=== Interior ===
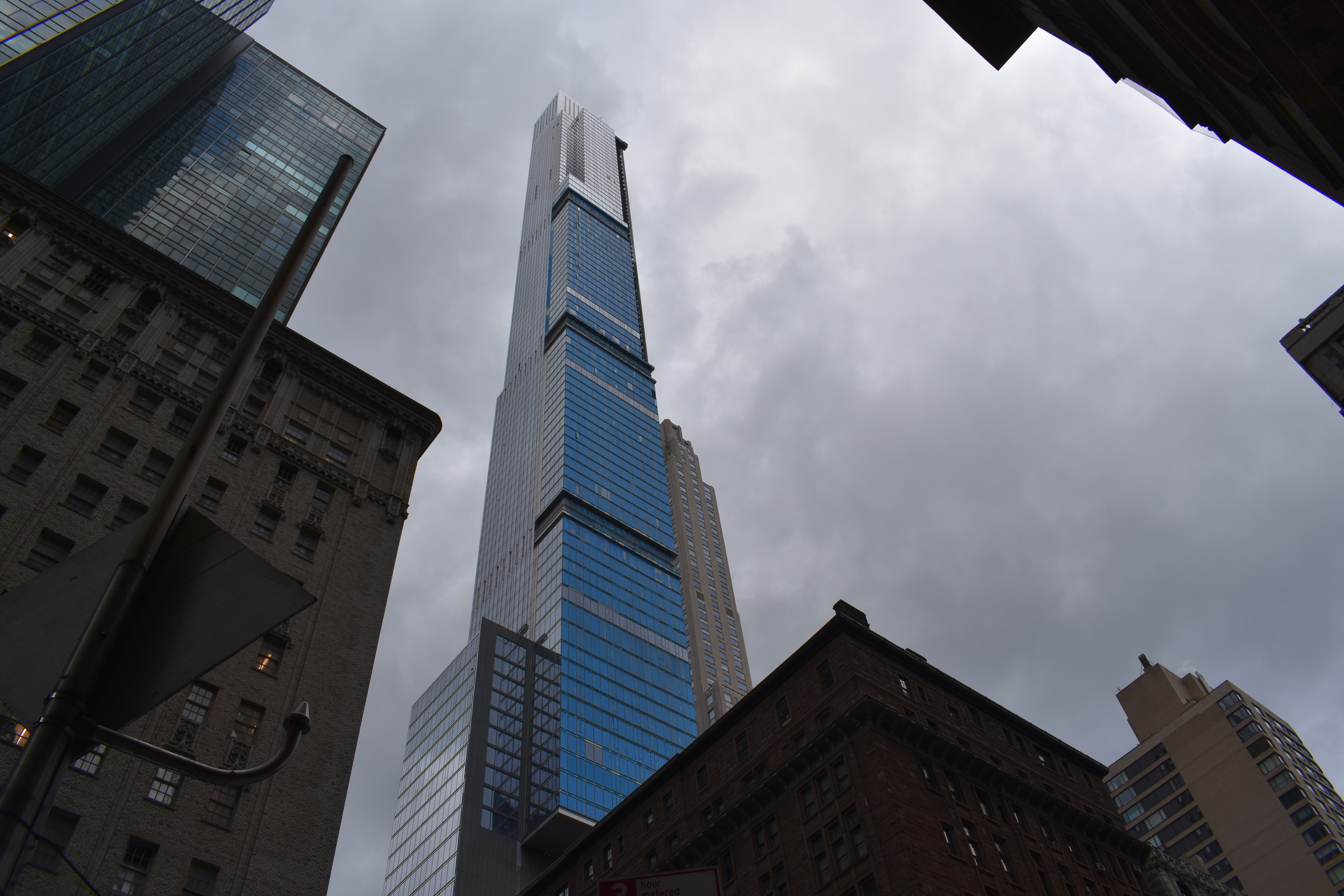
Seen in December 2020

The building has a gross floor area of 1,285,308 square feet (119,409.0 m^{2}). The first seven floors of the tower are anchored by New York City's first Nordstrom department store, while the next five floors house amenity spaces for residents. Separate mechanical systems, such as power, cooling, and heating systems, are provided for the retail and residential portions of the building. The core of the tower is shifted to the eastern side of the base, creating an open floor plan for the retail floors. Gordon Gill, one of the building's architects, said the core was shifted to the side before the rest of the tower was designed. The residents' lobby has brass-and-wood details, a Lalique chandelier, and an indoor waterfall. Throughout the building are amenity spaces designed by Colin Cowie, who commissioned other experts to create custom scents and music for the residences.

The building has 11 elevators. Four serve residential stories: three for residents and one shared by residents and service workers. Three other elevators are installed within individual suites: one in the duplex on floors 107/108, one in the duplex on floors 127/128, and one on the penthouse on floors 129–131. The residential elevators, developed by Otis Worldwide, travel 2,000 feet per minute (610 m/min). There are two additional service elevators in the building, one serving the base and another serving the highest stories. The retail base is served by its own set of elevators. The building has two emergency exit stairs extending its full height, and the retail space has at least three exit stairs.

==== Residential condominiums ====
The building contains 179 residential condominiums starting on the 32nd floor. Each unit has two to eight bedrooms, with 1,435 to 17,500 square feet (133.3 to 1,625.8 m^{2}) of floor area. The average apartment spans 5,000 square feet (460 m^{2}). The cheapest apartment was a $1.5 million studio, according to offering plans in 2017. By contrast, twenty of the largest units were being sold at over $60 million each, and the penthouse was originally listed at $250 million. The interiors of the building's condominiums were designed by Rottet Studio. According to Gordon Gill, the materials and arrangement of each unit was intended to "address a softer, more sustainable, and sophisticated expression". The units have open layouts and floor-to-ceiling windows overlooking Central Park or other nearby structures. Some of the units have double-height ceilings. Interior features include Miele and Sub-Zero appliances, custom cabinetry, and white oak floors. A small number of units have concrete terraces, (Note: According to Extell Marketing Group 2017, p. D.24 (PDF p. 324), these include one unit each on floors 39, 53, and 109; two units on floor 77; the duplex on floors 107/108, and the penthouse.) but there are otherwise no balconies.

Most residences in Central Park Tower are given a letter designation that is appended to their floor number. Floors 32–38 have studios and two- or three-bedroom units, with four units labeled A–D on floor 32 and six labeled A–F on each of the other stories. Floor 39 contains two condominiums: unit A with three bedrooms and unit B with five bedrooms. Floors 43–49 each have four units labeled A–D, which contain either one or three bedrooms. Floor 53 is a single-story simplex unit with four bedrooms, while floors 54–70 each contain three units, labeled E, N, or W, with two or three bedrooms. Floors 77–96 contain two condominiums each; the unit labeled W has three bedrooms while the unit labeled E has four bedrooms. Floor 109 is a five-bedroom simplex, while floors 110–126 each contain a full-story unit with five bedrooms. (Note: On floors with more than two units, allocations are as follows: On floors 33 through 38, units A–C each have three bedrooms, D and F have two bedrooms, and E is a studio.; On floors 43 through 49, units A–C each have three bedrooms and D has one bedroom.; On floors 54 through 70, units E and W have three bedrooms and N has two bedrooms.)

Three of the largest units in Central Park Tower are the seven-bedroom duplex on floors 107 and 108; the eight-bedroom duplex on floors 127 and 128; and the seven-bedroom triplex penthouse on floors 129 through 131. The duplex on floors 107–108 covers 12,557 square feet (1,166.6 m^{2}); the duplex on floors 127–128 covers 11,535 square feet (1,071.6 m^{2}); and the triplex penthouse on floors 129–131 covers 17,545 square feet (1,630.0 m^{2}). The $150 million duplex on floors 127–128 has nine bathrooms, a 30-foot-long (9.1 m) dining room, and an observatory. The penthouse contains its own gym, ballroom, library, and observatory. The three units have their own elevators and elevator lobbies. These units also have their own private staircases. When the topmost duplex was sold in 2024, one real-estate agent noted that this unit had a 30-foot ceiling, saying: "High ceilings are the ultimate bragging right".

==== Amenities ====
There are 50,000 square feet (4,600 m^{2}) of amenities on the 8th through 12th stories, which are numbered as floors 14 through 18. The Central Park Club on floor 14 contains a lounge, theater, conference room, play area, and "tween lounge". Floor 14 also has an outdoor terrace spanning either 13,100 square feet (1,220 m^{2}) or 15,000 square feet (1,400 m^{2}), which was designed by HMWhite. The terrace contains a 60-by-16-foot (18.3 by 4.9 m) outdoor pool surrounded by pergolas and trellises; a central lawn with limestone and granite paths; and two gardens. There are two steam rooms in the changing room on floor 14. On floor 16 are an indoor pool, exercise rooms, spa, gym, basketball court, and children's playroom, as well as men's and women's lockers. The indoor lap pool measures 63 by 16 feet (19.2 by 4.9 m) and was inspired by Hearst Castle's indoor pool, with blue-and-gold mosaic decorations. The pool in the spa measures 13 by 7 feet (4.0 by 2.1 m). The changing room on floor 16 has one steam room, one men's sauna, and one women's sauna.

There is a three-floor private club named "The 100th Floor", marketed as the highest private club in the world. The private club is physically on the 68th story above ground but is marketed as floor 100. The space, designed by Rottet Studio, contains a 126-person ballroom and a cigar bar. The club also includes a resident-only dining room for residents, which is known as 10 Cubed. The main lounge contains gold-accented decorations and pearl- and sapphire-colored furniture, while the bar area has black and gold decorations inspired by the Art Deco style. In addition, floor 100 has a kitchen that serves the ballroom, bar, and dining room. Several chefs including Gabriel Kreuther Alfred Portale, and Laurent Tourndel helped create a Mediterranean-style menu for the amenity spaces. An early plan for Central Park Tower included a visitor observatory at the top of the building, but these plans were scrapped because Extell CEO Gary Barnett wanted to maximize condominium space.

The third subcellar has residential bike storage, a package room, and cold storage. In addition, the third subcellar has 103 storage lockers for residents. Some of the units on floors 77 through 96 have private storage closets outside the apartments.

==== Nordstrom ====
A Nordstrom department store occupies the building's first five floors and subcellars 1 and 2. The store spans 360,000 square feet (33,000 m^{2}) in total, of which 285,000 square feet (26,500 m^{2}) are within Central Park Tower; the remaining space is at 5 Columbus Circle and 1776 Broadway. Due to the high ceiling heights of the Nordstrom store, the first seven physical stories are collectively 280 feet (85 m) tall.

The Nordstrom location has an open plan for its floors. Each level has 19-foot (5.8 m) ceilings. The store's interiors are lit by the wavy glass facades of the base at 57th and 58th Streets. Other design features include halo reveals around each column; railings that wrap around the corners; and a terracotta wall near the elevators that resembles the wavy facade. The store also contains six bars and restaurants, including two operated by celebrity chef Tom Douglas.

== History ==
=== Planning ===
==== Land acquisition ====
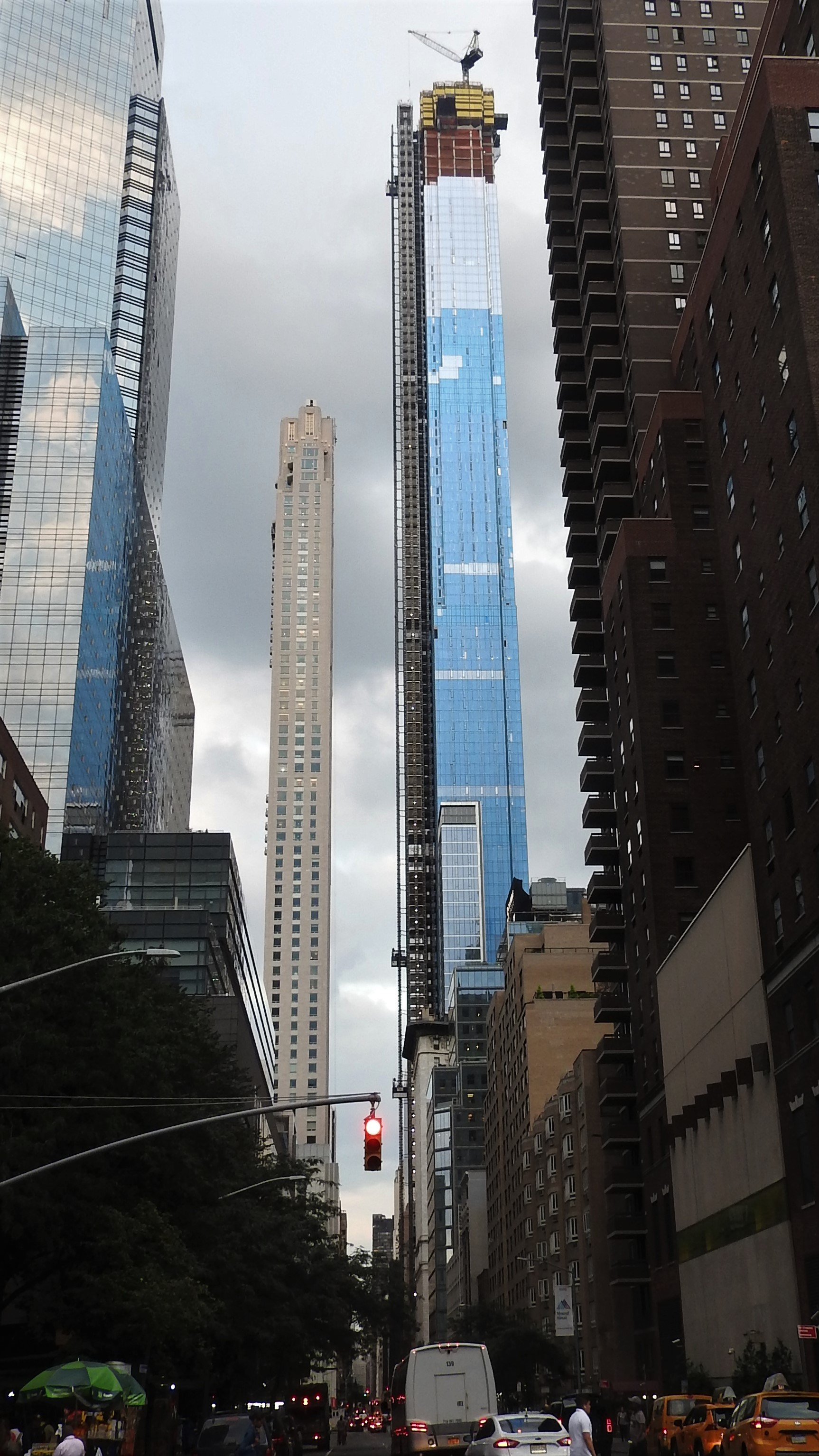
Looking east along 58th Street at Central Park Tower (right) and 220 Central Park South (left) in September 2019

The Central Park Tower was Extell's second tower to be constructed on Billionaires' Row, after One57. Extell began buying land for what would become the Central Park Tower in mid-2005. Extell purchased 221 West 57th Street and a neighboring lot for $67.5 million, yielding over 261,000 square feet (24,200 m^{2}) of buildable space. That September, Extell served one of 221 West 57th Street's occupants, the Broadway Dance Center, a notice of default for operating without the required public assembly permit. Extell also revoked the Center's use of the building's internal staircases due to theft concerns and offered the Center $1 million to move to a new home on 55th Street. Extell purchased 136,000 square feet (12,600 m^{2}) of air rights from the Art Students League of New York in early 2006 for $23.1 million, and later paid the Art Students League another $31.8 million for 6,000 square feet (560 m^{2}) of air rights.

Further air rights purchases followed in 2006 and 2007. This included 100,000 square feet (9,300 m^{2}) of air rights above the Osborne Apartments on 205 West 57th Street in January 2006; another 12,000 square feet (1,100 m^{2}) of air rights from the Saint Thomas Choir School at 202 West 58th Street in November 2006; and 14,290 square feet (1,328 m^{2}) of air rights from the 13-story apartment building at 200 West 58th Street in January 2007. In addition, in two separate 2006 purchases, Extell gained 156,000 square feet (14,500 m^{2}) of development rights from the purchase of 1780 Broadway and two contiguous properties and 20,000 square feet (1,900 m^{2}) of development rights from the purchase of a plot of 58th Street. Combined, these purchases allowed a building with up to 563,000 square feet (52,300 m^{2}) of floor area.

In July 2013, Extell paid $25 million for the lot at 232 West 58th Street, adding another 20,750 square feet (1,928 m^{2}) of development rights, and thus completing the site. That October, Extell purchased 90,000 square feet (8,400 m^{2}) of air rights from the Atlantic Development Group.

==== Attempted preservation of existing structures ====
The New York City Landmarks Preservation Commission (LPC) attempted to protect 225 West 57th Street and the neighboring 1780 Broadway in 2009, having unsuccessfully attempted to designate the structures as city landmarks in 1994. After Extell and New York City Council Speaker Christine Quinn pushed back, the LPC dropped its proposal to designate 225 West 57th Street as a landmark. In an LPC hearing, almost all parties except for the Real Estate Board of New York supported designating 1780 Broadway as a landmark. However, the proposed designation of 225 West 57th Street received both significant support and opposition: the American Institute of Architects, New York State Assembly member Richard N. Gottfried, and the Landmarks Preservation Council of Illinois spoke in favor of that building's designation while City Council members Melinda Katz, Daniel Garodnick, and Jessica Lappin spoke against landmark status.

On November 10, 2009, the LPC voted 6–3 to preserve 1780 Broadway's facade and tear down everything else. The three dissenting members of the LPC had wanted 225 West 57th Street to be preserved as well. The historian Robert A. M. Stern retrospectively wrote that the vote was controversial and was likely influenced by real estate interests. Preservation groups like the Historic Districts Council and New York Landmarks Conservancy expressed dissatisfaction that City Council members had influenced the decision. The council members had said they would veto any LPC designation for the properties if 225 West 57th Street was protected. Conversely, had both buildings been protected, Extell stated it would have canceled its development on the site. The last tenant of 1780 Broadway moved out of that building in April 2011. Extell demolished 225 West 57th Street in 2011 and destroyed the interiors of 1780 Broadway at the end of 2012.

=== Design ===
==== Nordstrom deal and original design ====
In June 2012, Nordstrom committed to occupying nearly 300,000 square feet (28,000 m^{2}) at the base of Extell's proposed tower. In exchange, Nordstrom agreed to buy the retail condominium on the tower's lowest seven stories; the Nordstrom deal earned Extell $400 million. Extell took out a $300 million mortgage from The Blackstone Group on the land around the same time. The new mortgage allowed Extell to repay a $250 million loan from HSBC on the site's existing properties. Extell raised a further $300 million by issuing bonds on the Tel Aviv Stock Exchange. In total, Extell received $1 billion from the retail condominium, the Blackstone mortgage, and the Israeli bond sales.

Construction permits were filed with the New York City Department of Buildings in November 2012. Extell revealed that Adrian Smith + Gordon Gill would design the tower, which was to be known as the Nordstrom Tower. The structure would rise 1,550 feet (470 m) to become the second-tallest building in New York City. It would rise higher than the roof of One World Trade Center, the city's tallest building by architectural height, and would be the tallest mostly-residential building worldwide, beating out several other buildings on Billionaires' Row. Adrian Smith's firm, which had been recommended by Nordstrom, beat out other contenders for the design including Herzog & de Meuron, SHoP Architects, Jean Nouvel, Foster and Partners, and Rogers Stirk Harbour + Partners.

==== Art Students League deal ====
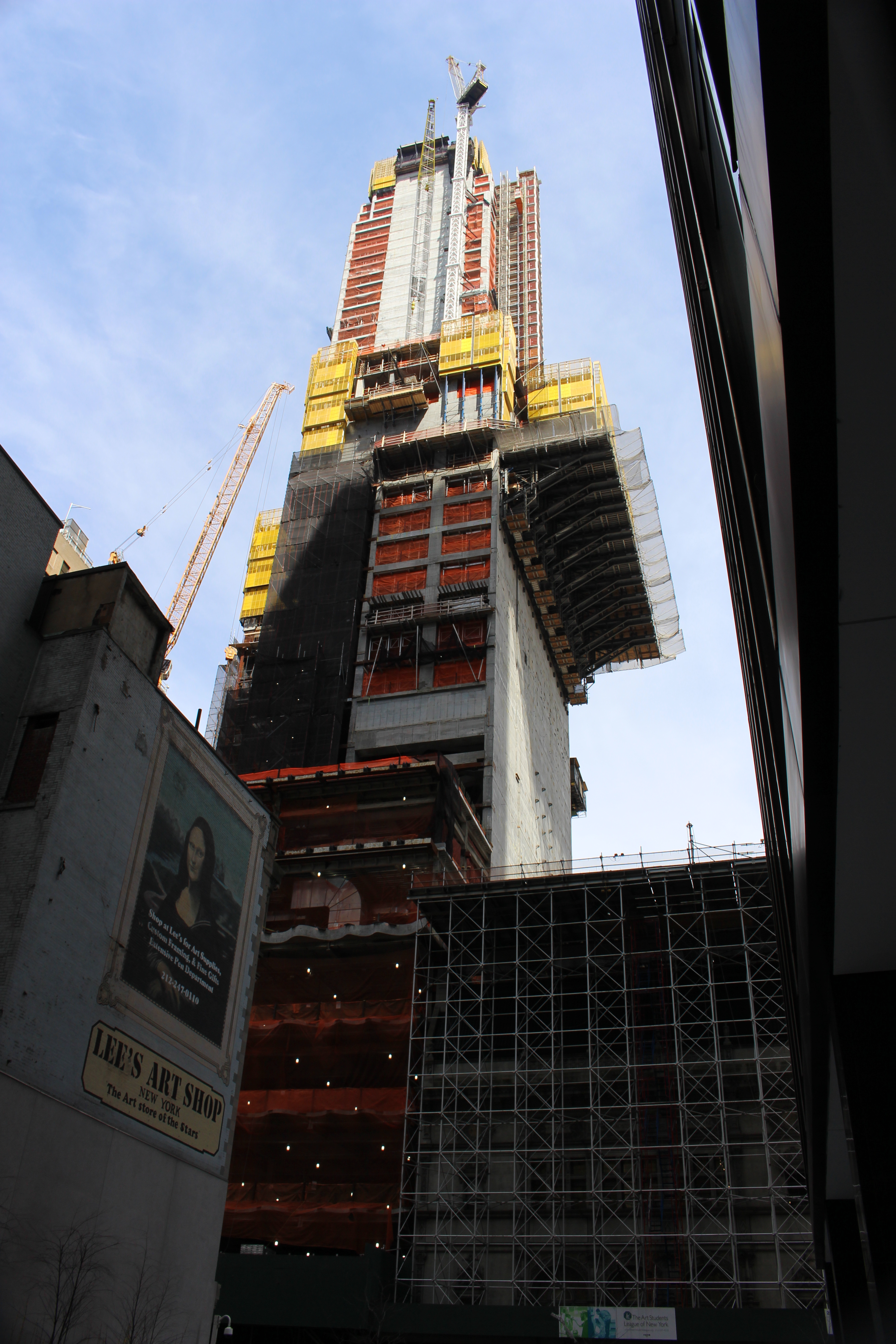
The cantilever over the American Fine Arts Society under construction

After learning that 220 Central Park South would block views of Central Park from the proposed tower, Barnett and his associates devised plans to cantilever part of the tower away from 220 Central Park South. This cantilever would overhang the Art Students League of New York's building at 215 West 57th Street. Since the Art Students League building was a designated city landmark, the LPC needed to certify that the cantilever would not have a negative visual impact on the older building. In addition, the tower would need to be structurally strengthened to support the weight of the cantilever. Gordon Gill sketched plans for the cantilever, which Barnett estimated would increase the construction budget by $300 million. The proposed cantilever garnered opposition from the community. In October 2013, Manhattan Community Board 5 voted against allowing the cantilever, although the vote was merely advisory; final power over the decision rested with the LPC. The LPC approved the air rights sale and cantilever in a 6–1 vote. The commission's chairman Robert B. Tierney concluded that, despite the tower's large size, the cantilever would have a "negligible impact on the landmark site".

That November, Extell revealed a revised design that would rise 1,423 feet (434 m) tall; Extell had demolished all the previous buildings on the site by then. Critics pressured the Art Students League to reject the cantilever, a move that Barnett claimed was made entirely "out of spite". In February 2014, the Art Students League also approved the deal in a 1,342–227 vote among all members despite opposition from several third parties including the Municipal Art Society. The vote had taken place after Extell had threatened to proceed without buying the league's air rights. Afterward, over 100 members of the Art Students League filed suit against Extell and the Art Students League organization itself to attempt to stop the air rights sale, but the lawsuit was dismissed in mid-2014.

In January 2016, three hundred members of the League sued the League's leadership, claiming that instructions on how to vote on the sale were misleading and that the publicized voting procedure was not followed correctly. According to the lawsuit, materials distributed by the League's leadership indicated that abstaining from voting would count the same as a "no" vote, which allegedly led many members not to vote on the issue. If non-voting members' decisions were counted as "no" votes, the tally should have been 2,603–1,342 against the air rights sale. The second lawsuit was dismissed through summary judgment when a judge ruled that the League's leadership had acted in good faith while interpreting the League's by-laws regarding voting procedures. An appeals court upheld the decision in March 2016, as reversing the air-rights sale would have resulted in an undue hardship that would cost Extell more than $200 million.

=== Construction ===
==== Initial construction ====
The company began excavating the building's 80-foot-deep (24 m) foundations in May 2014. A new design for the tower was leaked in July 2014, with the tower containing a 1,479-foot-tall (451 m) parapet. The spire was to reach 1,775 feet (541 m), just 1 foot (0.30 m) shorter than One World Trade Center's pinnacle. After nearly a year of excavation, the building's concrete foundation was poured in February 2015. Revised plans were announced in May 2015, showing a parapet height of 1,530 feet (470 m) and an architectural height of 1,775 feet (541 m) with the spire. If the spire had been built, it would have been on the eastern side of the tower. The website New York YIMBY reported the next month that the spire would rise to 1,795 feet (547 m), making the Nordstrom Tower the tallest in New York City and the Western Hemisphere. Extell founder Gary Barnett denied these rumors, saying he would keep the height at 1,775 feet "out of respect" to One World Trade Center. At the time, spokespeople for Extell would not confirm a final height and said leaked designs for the tower were "wrong".

By mid-2015, Extell sought to earn $4.4 billion from condominium sales; this figure included Nordstrom's $400 million retail condo. This figure would make the Nordstrom Tower the highest-grossing condominium building ever developed, beating out the $2 billion sellout price of 15 Central Park West, which had once been the highest-grossing condominium building in the U.S. At least twenty of the Nordstrom Tower's units were planned to cost $40 million or more. The tower crane was installed in July 2015, and the structure reached street level by the end of September. New permits filed that month showed the building without a spire but increased the parapet height to 1,550 feet (470 m). At the same time, the building's official name of "Central Park Tower" was unveiled and the completion date was pushed back to 2019. Work on the above-ground structure began in late 2015. The structural steel for Nordstrom's retail base was complete by the middle of 2016.

==== Financing difficulties ====
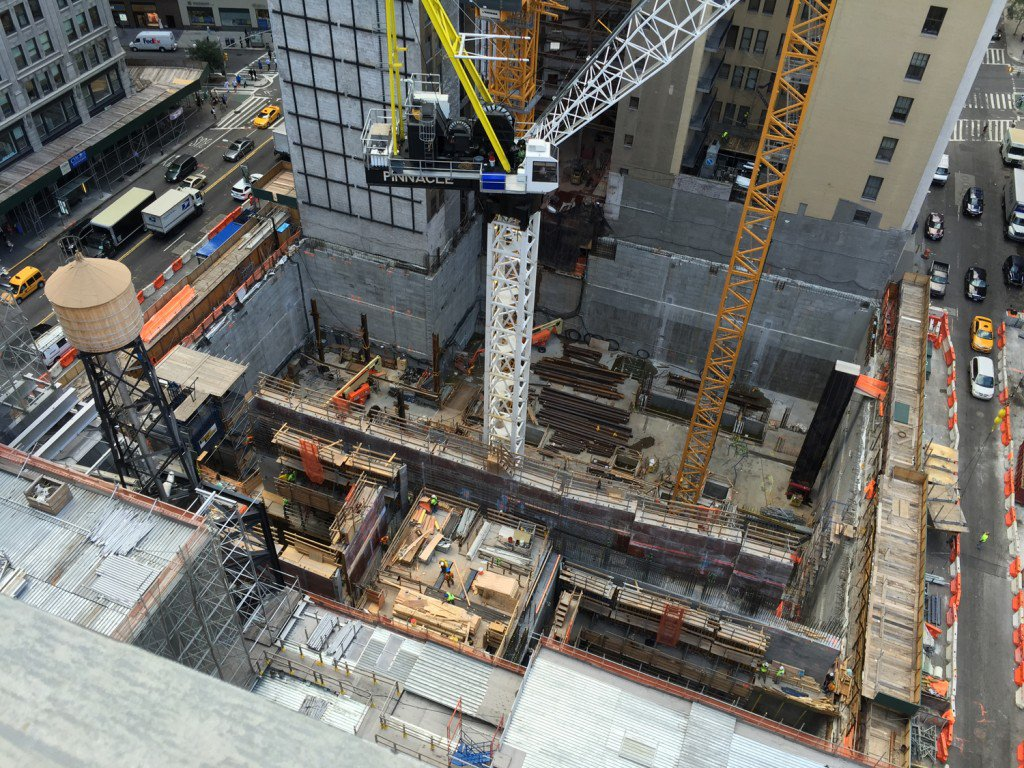
Central Park Tower under construction in October 2015

Meanwhile, Extell attempted to secure additional funding, and Barnett returned to Tel Aviv to look for more financing from Israeli investors, He had to raise $1.1 billion, but banks were increasingly reluctant to give loans to luxury developments. In June 2016, Extell announced it was seeking to raise $190 million in financing for the tower from foreign investors through the EB-5 visa program. Extell raised that amount mainly from Chinese investors, who each paid $500,000 in exchange for a green card that allowed them to become U.S. lawful permanent residents. Extell also brought in the Shanghai Municipal Investment Group (SMI) as an additional equity investor for roughly $300 million. Though the Blackstone loan had faced maturity in August 2016, Extell used the extra cash to repay $50 million of the loan and extend the maturity on the remainder, to December 9, 2016.

Even after the additional capital was secured, Extell still needed to receive a loan of roughly $1 billion by May 2017, or SMI could exercise a put option to force Extell to repay SMI's equity investment with interest. Despite banks' reluctance to give Extell money, author Katherine Clarke wrote that Extell likely would have been able to repay the loan in full. The $1 billion funding need amounted to about $2,000 per square foot ($22,000/m^{2}), whereas units at the neighboring 220 Central Park South were being sold at four times that amount. Concurrently, the interest rate on Extell's bonds on the Tel Aviv Stock Exchange had risen from 6 to 16 percent, effectively turning them into junk bonds, and Israeli investors expressed concerns that the project might be abandoned. If Extell defaulted on Blackstone's loan, its interest rate would increase from 8 to 14 percent. However, Blackstone was only willing to grant Extell a one-week extension on its land loan to December 17. The day the land loan was due, Extell closed a new $235 million bridge loan with JPMorgan Chase and hedge funds Fortress Investment Group and Baupost Group to repay Blackstone.

By March 2017, Extell disclosed that it had spent $939 million on the development of the tower since 2014, including over $300 million in 2016 alone. The tower's completion date was also pushed back another year to November 2020. At the same time, Nordstrom invested another $25 million, with a put option that allowed the company to force Extell to repurchase the store space if it was not ready by December 2018. A further $168 million came from EB-5 investors. In May 2017, SMI changed the terms for its equity investment, so that Extell could keep looking for a construction loan until the end of 2017. That June, Israeli bondholders became concerned that Extell would be unable to meet its bond obligations as it held only $120 million in cash, still had not closed a construction loan, and still had its bonds classified as junk bonds with a 13 percent interest rate. A month later, over 40 private and institutional bondholders met to discuss whether to force early repayment on the bonds. Extell was scheduled to repay $180 million in December 2018 but investors were worried that the company could not raise the cash. At the time, demand for luxury units was declining significantly.

Following the bondholder's meeting, Extell signed a term sheet for a $900 million construction loan with JPMorgan Chase in August 2017. That same month, an Israeli bond rating agency downgraded the credit ratings for all of Extell's bonds after the company revealed it had just $36 million in cash on hand. Extell stated that it intended to close on the loan with JPMorgan before the end of the year, but the cash on hand would not be able to sustain construction through 2018 without a loan. SMI also agreed to push back the deadline on their put option for a third time, from December 2017 to June 2018. In January 2018, Extell finally obtained the $1.1 billion it had been seeking. This consisted of $900 million in construction financing from JPMorgan Chase, with a 4.5% interest rate, and an additional $235 million preferred equity investment from hedge fund BlueCrest, with a 11% interest rate. JPMorgan required repayment of the loan by December 2021 and also stipulated that Extell sell $500 million worth of apartments by December 2020 or face default. Meanwhile, if BlueCrest's loan went into default, Extell had to give BlueCrest two of the penthouses. In March 2018, Extell announced they would be selling 17 percent of the equity in the tower to a group of investors for $107 million, sparking another downgrade of Extell's bonds. The delays prompted one investor to withdraw.

==== Sales launch and topping out ====
At the end of May 2017, Extell received approval to begin sales at Central Park Tower, with a total targeted $4.02 billion sellout for the project's 179 condominiums. A sales office was opened inside the tower, with decorations of New York City attractions and voice-overs advertising the building as "a shimmering beacon of class, optimism and chutzpah". The average unit price of $22.5 million was twice as much as the average sales price for a top New York City luxury apartment. Extell hoped to sell 20 of the units for more than $60 million each, including a $95 million penthouse. The first glass was installed on the building in September 2017 when the building was roughly a third of the way to its peak. The tower reached the 1,000-foot (300 m) mark in the spring of 2018 and was approximately 1,300 feet (400 m) tall by the end of the year. In October 2018, Extell officially launched sales at the project. Extell's sales team furnished a model apartment for potential buyers; Barnett furnished the apartment's kitchen with silver cabinetry, though some members of the sales team argued that the cabinets would repel would-be residents.

By the end of 2018, Extell had spent $1.7 billion on construction of the tower and expected to spend another $1.3 billion before the building opened. This total project cost of $3 billion was over $1 billion higher than the $1.9 billion that Extell expected construction to cost in 2016. Extell also increased the projected sellout of the building's condominiums to $4.5 billion or $7,450 per square foot, up from projections of $4.02 billion in May 2017 and higher even than the $4.4 billion in sales Extell expected in 2016. The company also unveiled new buyers' incentives, offering to waive between three and five years of common charges and pay 50 percent of broker's commissions. In interviews in 2019, Barnett said that condominiums were not selling as quickly as at Extell's previous One57 development during the early 2010s, when there were no other luxury developments nearby. Barnett signaled an openness to discounting units to increase sales in addition to the existing buyers' incentives. While Barnett did not disclose sales numbers, he said that half of the buyers would be "English speakers" and the other half would be foreign buyers.

The building's first condominiums were publicly listed for sale in May 2019. Central Park Tower topped out on September 17, 2019; this made it the world's tallest residential building, as well as the tallest building by roof height in the Western Hemisphere. The Nordstrom store was the first part of the Central Park Tower to be finished, opening on October 24, 2019. By the end of the year, the building's glass curtain wall had been almost completely installed. Construction was temporarily halted in March 2020 due to the COVID-19 pandemic in New York City. Barnett had wanted to sell $500 million of apartments by the end of that year, but the pandemic had halted nearly all global travel, making it nearly impossible for him to reach his goal. By late 2020, the construction crane was being disassembled, and the first residents started moving into Central Park Tower. The tower's total cost was cited as $3 billion or $3.1 billion.

==== Construction incidents ====
On July 12, 2017, a 4,300-pound (2,000 kg) crate containing window panes fell from floor 16 after a ramp connecting the construction hoist to the building collapsed. The New York City Fire Department closed 58th Street for the rest of the day to investigate.

On December 18, 2019, ice falling from Central Park Tower injured a pedestrian, who required hospitalization. Multiple blocks near the building were closed to traffic and pedestrians by the Department of Emergency Management, and the Department of Buildings stopped construction on the building indefinitely. The falling ice was considered problematic because ice sliding down a flat facade, such as that of Central Park Tower, could reach a maximum speed of 70 miles per hour (110 km/h) from a height of as little as 15 stories.

On May 26, 2018, a glass panel at the ground floor toppled onto 67-year-old security guard Harry Ramnauth, who later died due to blunt force trauma of the neck and torso. A construction worker at the scene fractured his right foot when he tried to rescue Ramnauth. Following the incident, a stop-work order was placed on the site, and Lendlease Group, contractor Pinnacle Industries, and Extell paid the guard's family $1.25 million to settle the family's wrongful death claim. The Occupational Safety and Health Administration (OSHA) also fined Lendlease and subcontractor Permasteelisa North America $12,934 each. Lendlease was also fined $25,000 by the New York City Office of Administration Trials and Hearings for failing to adequately safeguard the construction site.

=== Completion and opening ===
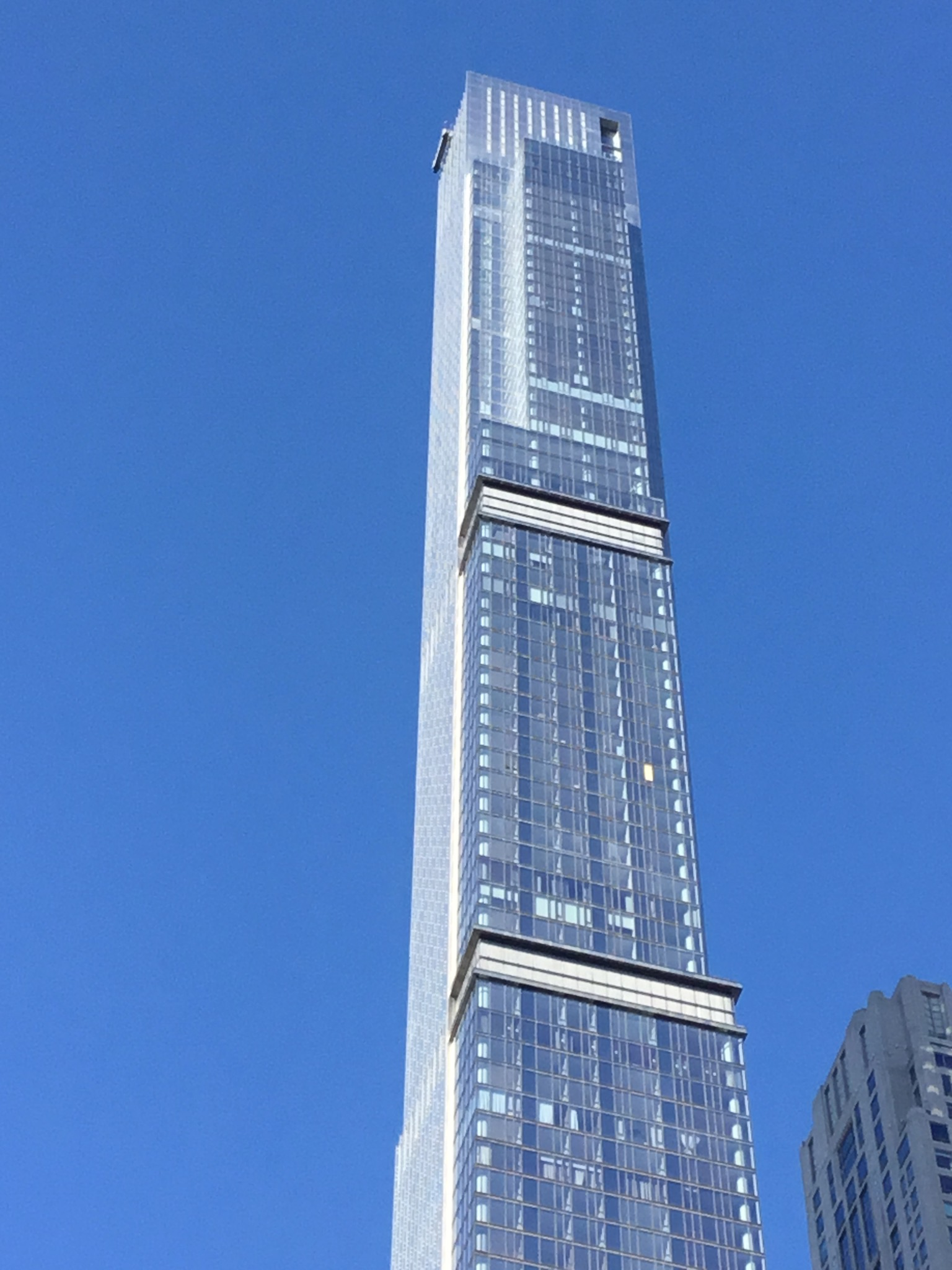
The building seen in 2022

While some media sources reported that Central Park Tower was completed by the end of 2020, finishes were still being applied through 2021, and an official completion had not been announced. Barnett also sought further loans due to lagging apartment sales. In January 2021, the project received a $380 million mezzanine loan from Sail Harbor Capital and Baupost Group, which was to mature at the end of 2021. The first buyers finalized the purchases of their apartments in February 2021, and the crown began lighting up at night that May. The new tower also hosted events such as the 100th-birthday celebration of the fashion designer Iris Apfel that September. Concurrent with the slowdown in the luxury residential market, several units at Central Park Tower sold well below their asking prices in late 2021. By October, thirty-three units had been sold at an average discount rate of 25%; in some cases, units were discounted by as much as 50%.

The building was finished by December 2021. Among the first condominium owners were several members of NASCAR racing's France family, Meta Platforms executive Nicola Mendelsohn, and businessman Matt Kaulig. By mid-2022, Extell had sold more than $1 billion worth of units at Central Park Tower. The company predicted that it would be unable to reach a $4 billion sellout because so many units were being sold at discounted prices, and Barnett said he would not be able to recover some of the equity he had spent on the project. Due to slightly increased construction costs and the COVID-induced slowdown in the luxury market, Extell had revised its predicted profits from the Central Park Tower downward. Whereas Extell had originally predicted a net profit of over $2 billion in 2018, the company was predicting an $845 million profit in 2021. (Note: The predicted profit of $2.1 billion in 2018 is the difference between the projected sellout of $4.9 billion and the construction cost of $2.8 billion. The predicted profit of $845 million in 2021 was because the sellout was decreased to $3.945 billion, and the cost had increased to $3.1 billion.) The penthouse on floors 127/128, originally listed at $250 million, was marketed for $195 million by mid-2023; the only other penthouse with an asking price of more than $100 million was the duplex on floors 107/108.

Extell received a $500 million inventory loan from JPMorgan Chase in March 2023, which covered 87 unsold apartments, and Extell refinanced the building that July with a $500 million loan from JPMorgan Chase and the Reuben brothers. Apartment sales continued; for instance, the unit on floors 107/108 was sold for $115 million in 2024, making it New York City's fourth-most-expensive residence ever at the time. Extell refinanced 18 of the unsold apartments in early 2025 with a $270 million loan, and it continued to reduce apartment prices. By mid-2025, three of the original condo owners had resold their apartments: two for nearly the same price that the original owner had paid, and one at a significant loss.

== Reception ==
Central Park Tower received mixed reviews during its development. In 2013, Justin Davidson described the development of Central Park Tower and One57 as part of the "plutocratization of the midtown skyline". In 2015, a neighborhood group protested the fact that the Nordstrom Tower and other Billionaires' Row towers would cast long shadows over Central Park. Martin Filler of the New York Review of Books wrote that year that the cantilever over the Art Students League building was an example of what the historian Carol Willis called "skyscraper Monopoly", in reference to the popular board game. Michael Kimmelman, in The New York Times, said that the cantilever was akin to "a giant with one foot raised, poised to squash a poodle". Writers also called Central Park Tower a symbol of wealth inequality within New York City.

When the building topped out during 2019, Elizabeth Kim wrote for the Gothamist that Central Park Tower was "a mixed-use but indisputably high-end building" but that its height record was "almost a ho-hum occurrence in New York City". A writer for CNBC said at the time: "Central Park Tower is not just a new building—it's a statement." Architectural writer Carter Horsley described the curved facade of the base as "very alluring" and the cantilever as a "significant broadening for the bulk of the building's prodigious height". Upon the tower's completion, Architectural Digest wrote: "But for such a grandiose statement, the design team decided on a minimal aesthetic for the exterior—it's a kind of modern classic, inspired by luxury." Davidson said the building "expresses the primacy of engineering over elegance". Carter Horsley called the facade's curves "very alluring". New York Times Magazine writer Nancy Hass called it "one of the most hair-raising new cantilevered buildings in New York".

== See also ==
- List of New York City Designated Landmarks in Manhattan from 14th to 59th Streets
- List of tallest buildings in New York City
- List of tallest buildings in the United States
- List of tallest residential buildings
- List of tallest buildings
