= Herbert Tannenbaum =

German-American art dealer and film theorist (1892–1958)

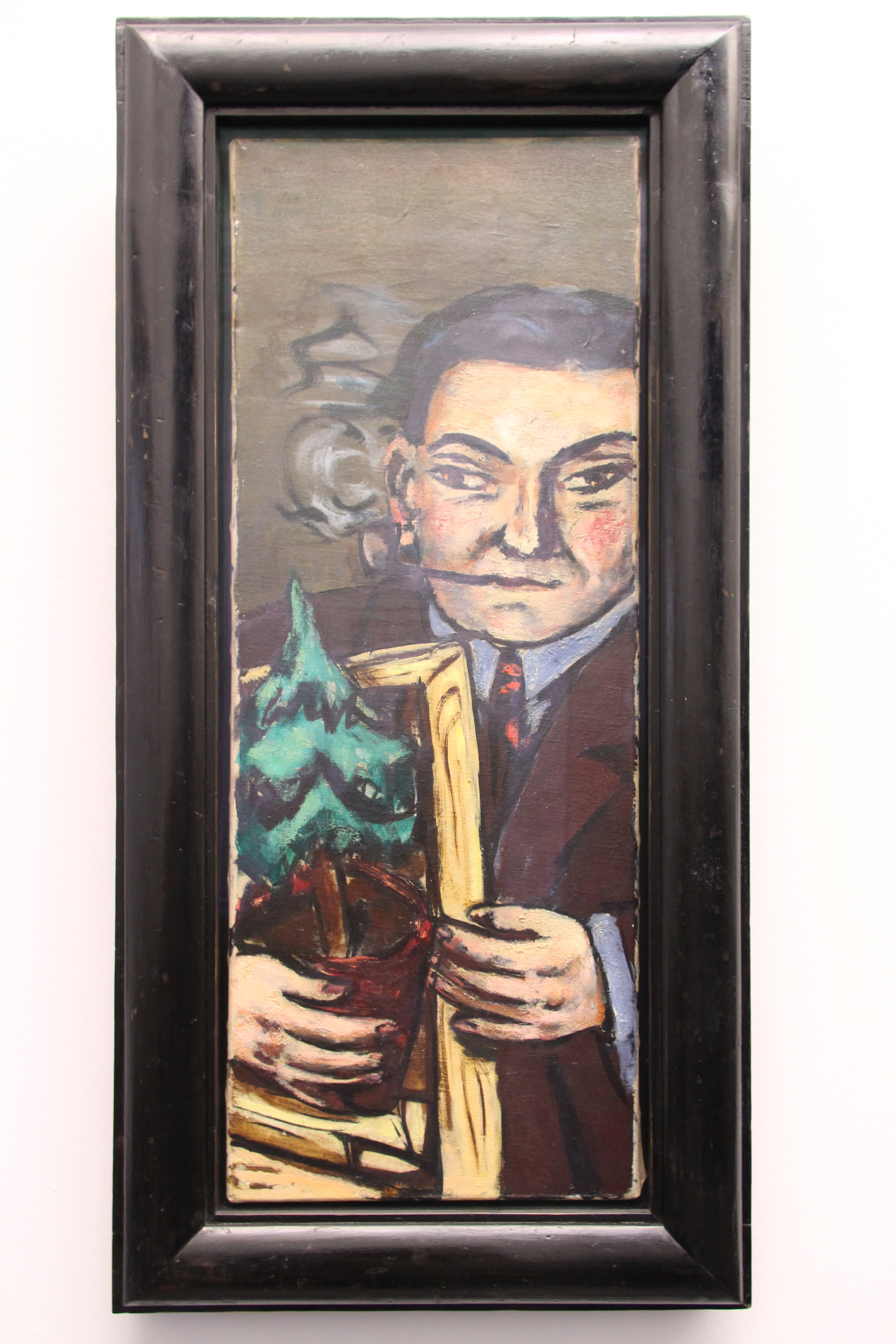
Max Beckmann: Tannenbaum geht nach New York (Tannenbaum is going to America) (1947), Kunsthalle Mannheim

Herbert Tannenbaum (March 7, 1892, in Mannheim – September 30, 1958, in Frankfurt am Main) was a German-American art dealer and film theorist.

== Early life ==
Herbert Tannenbaum was the son of Benni Tannenbaum (1860–1916) and his wife Emma, née Levi (1871–1922). He attended the Karl-Friedrich-Gymnasium in Mannheim and showed great interest in music, art and theater. From 1910 he studied law in Heidelberg and Munich. Interested in film, he focused his doctorate on copyright in film. As a student, he wrote essays on art, theater and film. In addition to his studies, Tannenbaum also worked as a volunteer at the Kunsthalle Mannheim and was involved with the Freie Bund zur Einbürgerung der bildenden Kunst (Free Association for the Naturalization of Fine Arts) in Mannheim, which was founded in 1911.

In 1914, Tannenbaum moved to Berlin and took a job with the film company Projektions-AG-Union. Along the way, he studied art history at Berlin University and directed a "detective burlesque" entitled Cognac Five Star.

In World War I, he was deployed on the Western Front in Champagne from March 1914. He was awarded both the Iron Cross 2nd Class and the Wounded Badge in Black. Returning to Mannheim in November 1918, he became involved in the Mannheim Workers' and Soldiers' Council.

== Art dealer ==
From August 1920, Tannenbaum ran the art shop Das Kunsthaus in Mannheim, where he offered original works of art as well as art books and magazines. From 1921, the store was located in the corner building Friedrichsring / Freßgasse (Q7, 17a), the interior had been designed by the artist of the Wiener Werkstätte, Emanuel Josef Margold. Among the customers of the art shop was also the Mannheim Kunsthalle, which in 1928, for example, acquired Marc Chagall's painting Rabbi, which was removed by the National Socialists in 1937 as part of the exhibition "Degenerate Art". His marriage to Maria Nobisch took place in 1921.

== Nazi persecution in Germany and the Netherlands ==
After the Nazis came to power in 1933, Tannenbaum was persecuted because of his Jewish heritage. On April 1, 1933, his art shop was boycotted. From April 4 to June 5, 1933, the art-political smear show Kulturbolschewistische Bilder (Cultural Bolshevik Images) took place at the Kunsthalle Mannheim under the new National Socialist leadership, in which the acquisitions of modern art under the museum director Gustav Hartlaub, who had been dismissed in 1933, were attacked and ridiculed; Tannenbaum was also attacked as a Jew and as a mediator of modern art. One day earlier, on April 3, 1933, the National Socialist newspaper Hakenkreuzbanner had written: "When going through the show, the German people become only more aware that it was Jews and Jewish art dealers (Flechtheim, Cassirer, Tannenbaum) who talked up 'works' to a Dr. Hartlaub, who after such achievements could be described as unsuitable for the Kunsthalle, which must represent after-art and put the aesthetics of a healthy person in harness."

In 1936, Tannenbaum sold his art business to the Dresden art dealer Rudolf Probst. Tannenbaum emigrated to the Netherlands in 1937 and set up a small art gallery adjacent to his apartment at Leonardostraat 6 in Amsterdam. In the Netherlands, Tannenbaum was in contact with German emigre artists such as Heinrich Campendonk and Max Beckmann. Tannenbaum's efforts to obtain entry permits to the Netherlands for his brother Otto and his cousin Paula Straus, a well-known Stuttgart goldsmith, failed, and they were murdered in the Auschwitz concentration camp. After the German occupation of the Netherlands in 1940, Tannenbaum was threatened with constant persecution; only his "mixed marriage," as it was called by the National Socialists, offered some protection. Tannenbaum was no longer allowed to practice his business under the German occupation. During the last years of the war, he did not leave his house at all and at times hid in a hovel in the attic.

== Emigration to the USA ==
In 1947, Tannenbaum emigrated to the USA with his family. On this occasion, Max Beckmann created the painting Tannenbaum is going to America, which has been in the Kunsthalle Mannheim since 2004. In New York, Tannenbaum was able to open a new gallery and art store on 57th Street in 1949. During a visit to Germany, Tannenbaum died suddenly in September 1958. His widow Maria continued to run the gallery until 1968.

== Estate ==
A "Herbert Tannenbaum Collection" containing photographs and documents from his estate is housed in the Jewish Museum in Berlin.

== Publications ==
- Kino und Theater, München: Steinebach 1912.
- Kinoprobleme. In: Jahrbuch Mannheimer Kultur, Jg. 1, 1913, S. 138–143.
- Der Krieg und der Kino. In: Bild & Film, Jg. 4, 1914, Heft 4, S. 29–31. (Digitalisat der Bibliothek für Bildungsgeschichtliche Forschung des DIPF).
- Kino, Plakat und Kinoplakat. In: Bild & Film, Jg. 4, 1914, Heft 9, S. 173–180 (Digitalisat der Bibliothek für Bildungsgeschichtliche Forschung des DIPF).
  - Wieder abgedruckt in: Das Plakat, Jg. 5 (1914), Heft 6, S. 236–246 (Digitalisat).
- als Herausgeber: Jüdische Grabstelen fürs Feld, o. O. 1916.
- Das Badische Land im Bild. In: Deutsche Kunst und Dekoration, Jg. 44, 1919, S. 93–101 (Digitalisat der Universitätsbibliothek Heidelberg).
- Die Zukunft des Mannheimer Nationaltheaters. In: Mannheimer Theater-Jahrbuch, Jg. 1, 1919, S. 129–130.
- als Herausgeber: Hans Thomas graphische Kunst, Dresden: Arnold 1920 (Arnolds graphische Bücher. Folge 1, Graphik; 2).
- Gute Zigarren-Packungen. In: Deutsche Kunst und Dekoration, Jg. 46, 1920, S. 75–82 (Digitalisat der Universitätsbibliothek Heidelberg).
- Kinematographisches Urheberrecht, o. O. [1923], Dissertation Universität Heidelberg 1920

== Literature ==
- Helmut H. Diederichs: Der Filmtheoretiker Herbert Tannenbaum, Frankfurt a. M.: Deutsches Filmmuseum 1987.
- Helmut H. Diederichs: Herbert Tannenbaum – Filmtheoretiker, Publizist. In: CineGraph – Lexikon zum deutschsprachigen Film, Lieferung 9, 1987.
- Karl-Ludwig Hoffmann: Für die Kunst! Herbert Tannenbaum und sein Kunsthaus. Ein Galerist – seine Künstler, seine Kunden, sein Konzept, Mannheim: Reiss-Museum 1994.
- Rolf Lauter (Red.): Max Beckmann, Bildnis Herbert Tannenbaum, 1947. Kunsthaller Mannheim, Berlin: Kulturstiftung der Länder 2005 (Patrimonia; 260).
- Sarah Spurzem: Herbert Tannenbaum (1892–1959 [sic!]) – Filmtheoretiker, Kunstsammler und Kunsthändler. In: Wilhelm Kreuz, Volker von Offenberg (Hrsg.): Jüdische Schüler des Vereinigten Großherzoglichen Lyceums – Karl-Friedrich-Gymnasiums Mannheim. Porträts aus zwei Jahrzehnten, Mannheim 2014 (Schriftenreihe des Karl-Friedrich-Gymnasiums Mannheim in Kooperation mit dem Stadtarchiv Mannheim – Institut für Stadtgeschichte 2), ISBN 978-3-95428-153-4, S. 187–196.

== See also ==
- The Holocaust in the Netherlands
- Nuremberg Laws
