= 224 West 57th Street =

Commercial building in Manhattan, New York

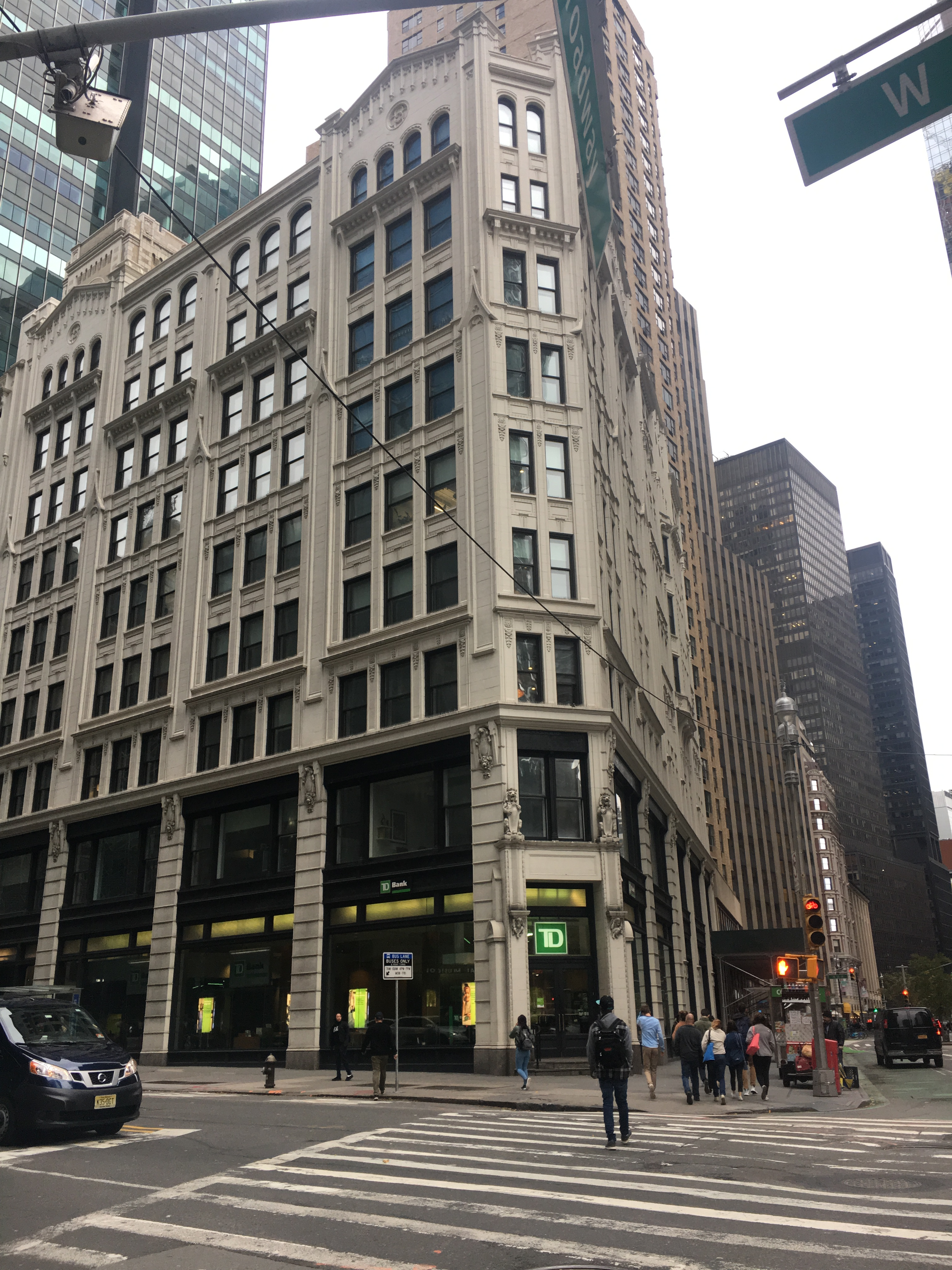
- Interactive map of the 224 West 57th Street area
- Former names: A. T. Demarest & Company Building, Peerless Motor Car Company Building
- Alternative names: Argonaut Building

General information
- Type: Commercial
- Architectural style: Gothic Revival, Romanesque Revival
- Location: 224 West 57th Street, Manhattan, New York, United States
- Coordinates: 40°45′57″N 73°58′54″W
- Groundbreaking: March 1909
- Opened: June–September 1909
- Client: A. T. Demarest & Company and Peerless Motor Company
- Landlord: Eretz Group

Height
- Height: 132.91 feet (40.51 m)

Technical details
- Structural system: Steel frame
- Floor count: 12

Design and construction
- Architect: Francis H. Kimball
- Main contractor: George A. Fuller Company

New York City Landmark
- Designated: December 19, 2000
- Reference no.: 2082

224 West 57th Street, also known as the Argonaut Building and formerly as the Demarest and Peerless Company Building, is a commercial building on the southeast corner of Broadway and 57th Street in Midtown Manhattan, New York City, just south of Columbus Circle. The building consists of two formerly separate structures, the A. T. Demarest & Company Building and the Peerless Motor Car Company Building, both used by automobile companies. Both structures were designed by Francis H. Kimball and erected by the George A. Fuller Company with similar Gothic Revival and Romanesque Revival architectural details.

The portion of the building at the corner of 57th Street and Broadway was built for car manufacturer Aaron T. Demarest and his company. The section belonging to the former Peerless Motor Company is an L-shaped structure wrapping around the A. T. Demarest Building. 224 West 57th Street is 11 stories tall; the former Demarest section rises nine stories, while the Peerless section contains a partial tenth floor and an additional two-story tower. 224 West 57th Street contains a steel-frame curtain wall, concrete piers, and a facade of glazed architectural terracotta. Inside, both of the former structures had automotive storerooms at ground level and warehouses and repair facilities on the upper floors.

The Demarest and Peerless buildings were constructed simultaneously in 1909. General Motors (GM) bought both buildings in 1918 and combined them internally. After GM constructed other buildings in Manhattan, 224 West 57th Street was renamed the Argonaut Building to avoid confusion. The Hearst Corporation bought 224 West 57th Street in 1977 and housed its Hearst Magazine department there until 2006. The New York City Landmarks Preservation Commission designated the building as a city landmark in 2000. The building was renovated from 2008 to 2011 and subsequently became the headquarters of Open Society Foundations.

== Site ==
224 West 57th Street is on the southeastern corner of Broadway and 57th Street, two blocks south of Columbus Circle and Central Park in the Midtown Manhattan neighborhood of New York City. The building carries the addresses 1758–1770 Broadway and 224–228 West 57th Street. The lot occupies an area of 14,200 feet (4,300 m), with frontage of 136 feet (41 m) on Broadway and 141 feet (43 m) on 57th Street. The lot measures 116 feet (35 m) along its eastern lot line and 91.6 feet (27.9 m) on its southern lot line.

224 West 57th Street abuts the American Society of Civil Engineers' Society House to the east and faces Central Park Tower to the north. Other nearby buildings include the American Fine Arts Society (also known as the Art Students League of New York building) and Osborne Apartments to the northeast; Rodin Studios and 888 Seventh Avenue to the east; and 1740 Broadway to the south.

In the 20th century, the area was part of Manhattan's "Automobile Row", a stretch of Broadway extending mainly between Times Square at 42nd Street and Sherman Square at 72nd Street. Before the first decade of the 20th century, the area was occupied mostly by equestrian industries and was described by The New York Times as "thoroughly lifeless". By 1907, the Times characterized this section of Broadway as having "almost a solid line of motor vehicle signs all the way from Times Square to Sherman Square". In the late 1900s and early 1910s, several large automobile showrooms, stores, and garages were built on Broadway, including the B.F. Goodrich showroom (later part of Central Park Tower) and the U.S. Rubber Company Building just north of 224 West 57th Street.

== Architecture ==
Both of the formerly separate buildings comprising 224 West 57th Street, the Demarest and Peerless Buildings, were designed by Francis H. Kimball. The Demarest Company section takes up the corner lot, measuring 66 by 116 feet (20 by 35 m), while the Peerless Company section occupies an L-shaped lot around the Demarest Building and measures 70 feet (21 m) wide on Broadway by 25 feet (7.6 m) wide on 57th Street. The structure was erected by the George A. Fuller Company with Purdy and Henderson as the consulting engineer.

The design of 224 West 57th Street's constituent structures incorporates many Gothic Revival and Romanesque Revival architectural details, to complement each other and the now-demolished Broadway Tabernacle church building to the south. Most of 224 West 57th Street is nine stories tall, although there is a tenth story atop part of the building. 224 West 57th Street's eastern section, belonging to the former Peerless Building, contains a penthouse rising two additional stories above the main roof. In total, 224 West 57th Street is 12 stories tall and has a roof height of 132.91 feet (40.51 m).

=== Facade ===
The facade, made almost entirely of terracotta, contains many decorative elements created by the New York Architectural Terra-Cotta Company. The northern and western elevations or sides of 224 West 57th Street are both subdivided into five groupings, each with three bays, and are connected by a canted corner. The northern two groupings on Broadway and the western four groupings on 57th Street belonged to the Demarest Building, while the southern three groupings on Broadway and the easternmost grouping on 57th Street was part of the Peerless Building. The southern facade, was originally visible behind the nave of the Broadway Tabernacle.

At the first and second stories, each of the five triple-width groupings are subdivided by double-height pilasters with cartouches at their tops. As built, these wide groupings originally contained automotive storefronts or entrances for pedestrians or vehicles. The easternmost grouping on 57th Street has a glass-and-metal doorway under a transom, and is flanked by inscribed bronze plaques with the building's name and address. The corner entrance at Broadway and 57th Street has glass-and-metal door under a transom. The facade has various ornamentation on the third through ninth stories, including colonettes, arched windows, cornices, and brackets. The second-southernmost grouping of the Broadway elevation has an oriel window spanning the fifth through seventh floors. Above the ninth floor, there are pediments over the six groupings comprising the former Demarest Building, and parapets over the four groupings that make up the former Peerless Building.

The southern elevation is clad in terracotta, but because of the presence of a neighboring building, only the westernmost two bays of the southern elevation are visible. The eastern elevation is made largely of tan brick. The two-story penthouse above the Peerless Building's easternmost section is clad in tan brick and contains terracotta trim, quoined pilasters, round arches with keyed surrounds, and tile signs on the western elevation. There were formerly also tile signs on the eastern and northern elevations of the penthouse.

=== Interior ===
Original floor plans

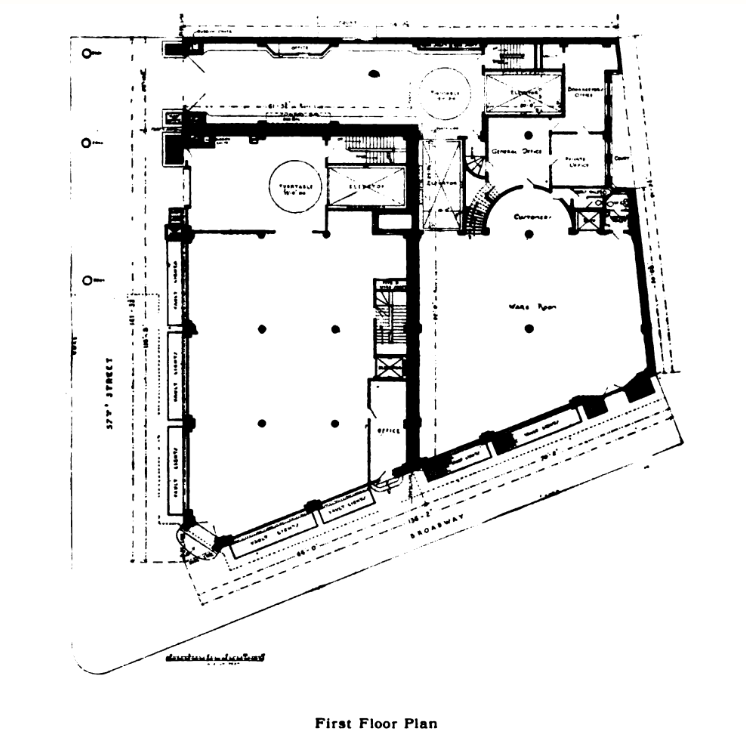
First floor plan

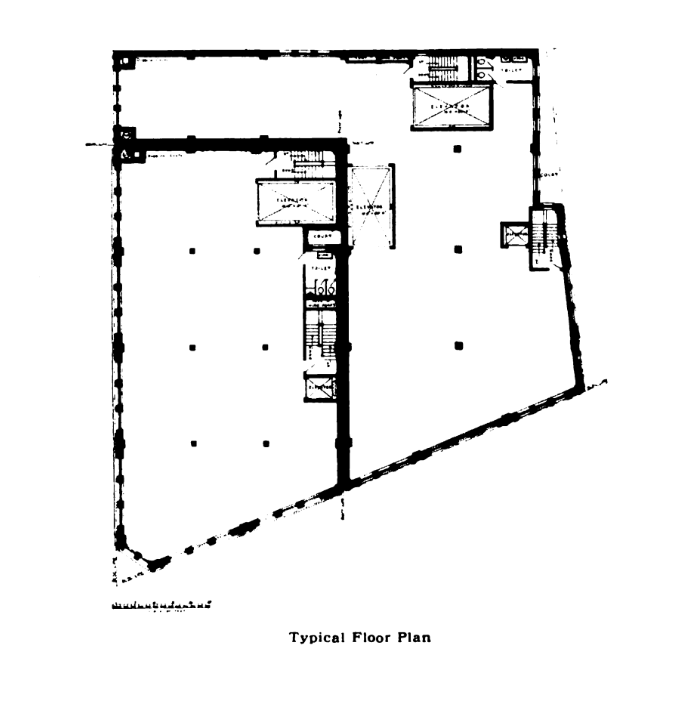
Typical plan for the upper floors

224 West 57th Street has 164,000 square feet (15,200 m^{2}) of usable interior space. This includes 6,000 square feet (560 m^{2}) at ground level, 4,800 square feet (450 m^{2}) in the tenth-floor penthouse, and between 10,000 and 18,000 square feet (930 and 1,670 m^{2}) on each of the other floors. Both constituent structures are supported by an internal steel frame atop concrete foundation piers, with the facade acting as a curtain wall.

Upon completion, the corner Demarest Building had offices as well as carriage and automobile warehouses. There was one elevator each for pedestrians and vehicles. The surrounding Peerless Building had a double-height ground-floor salesroom, with a gilded ceiling and marble walls and columns. The second through tenth floors respectively contained vehicle stock, new cars, used cars, an inspection studio, an upholstery department, repair shops, more repair shops, a painting department, and a blacksmith shop. The Peerless Building had two vehicle elevators, one passenger elevator, and a turntable.

== History ==
U.S. Realty, a company associated with builder George A. Fuller, purchased five lots at the southeast corner of 57th Street and Broadway in 1902. The lots had come under the ownership of Robert E. Dowling by 1905, when Dowling transferred these lots to the Island Realty Company. Island Realty planned to build an apartment hotel on the site, although this ultimately did not happen. The easternmost section of the lot was sold to the American Society of Civil Engineers in 1905 to make room for an extension of their Society House.

The Peerless and Demarest companies were among the companies that moved to Automobile Row in the first decade of the 20th century. The Peerless Motor Car Company of New York, a subsidiary of the Peerless Motor Company of Cleveland, Ohio, was headquartered at 220 West 41st Street by 1905. The A.T. Demarest Company, founded by Aaron T. Demarest, was headquartered on Fifth Avenue and 33rd Street prior to the construction of its 57th Street showroom.

=== Construction and early use ===
By December 1908, the Demarest Company leased the three corner lots at Broadway and 57th Street, intending to build a showroom and shop there. That month, Kimball was hired to prepare plans for a pair of buildings to be occupied by the Peerless and Demarest companies. Doan Realty, a subsidiary of the Peerless Company, bought the two lots surrounding the Demarest Company's land by mid-1909. U.S. Realty also sold off the corner plots under the new Demarest Building to the Matoaka Realty Company. Construction on the buildings commenced in March 1909. The Demarest Company's building was completed by that June, while the Peerless Company's building was completed three months later in September.

The Peerless Building represented an investment of $1 million, and collectively employed 250 workers upon completion. Peerless wrote that the new building allowed them to modify, repair, upholster, paint, and store cars "under one roof", and the word "Peerless" was mounted on the northern face of the Peerless Building's tower. One of the Peerless Building's two vehicle elevators was removed in 1912. Both the Demarest and Peerless companies stayed in their respective showrooms for less than a decade after their completion. Peerless had moved out by 1915, and Demarest stopped leasing its showroom by 1917.

=== General Motors ===
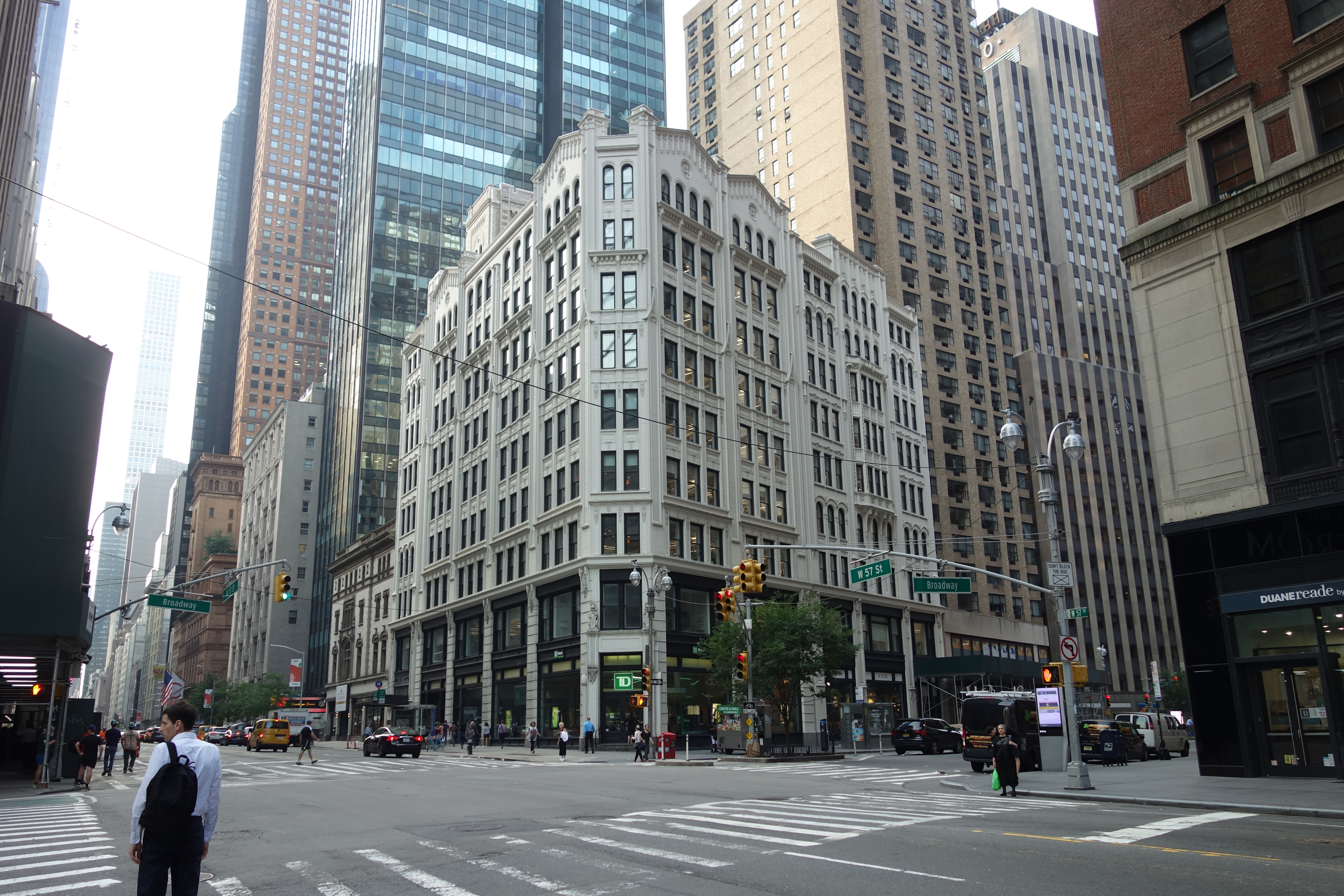
Seen from the northwest corner of Broadway and 57th Street

The Chevrolet Company, the automotive division of General Motors (GM), leased the Demarest Building starting in May 1917, and hired Henry Janeway Hardenbergh to renovate the Demarest Building. The following October, Chevrolet bought the Peerless and Demarest buildings at a combined $1.5 million. Sources vary on the sequence of the subsequent renovation. The New York City Landmarks Preservation Commission (LPC) and the Real Estate Record and Guide wrote that GM hired Hardenbergh for the renovations, with plans for the existing elevators and stairs to be taken out and replaced with three passenger elevators. However, The New York Times stated that the buildings were renovated by J. V. Phelan, and that while the Peerless Building's original vehicular entrance on 57th Street was removed, the Demarest Building's vehicular elevator was left intact. According to the Times, the upper floors were renovated and the blacksmiths' shop became a dining room for executives.

The two structures became known as the General Motors Building at 224 West 57th Street, and a tile sign with the words "General Motors Corporation" was added to the Peerless Building's tower. 224 West 57th Street thus served as General Motors' headquarters in New York City, and contained GM's general offices as well as those of Chevrolet, the General Motors Acceptance Corporation, and the General Motors Export Company. By 1926, GM was developing 3 Columbus Circle, a 26-story skyscraper diagonally across from 224 West 57th Street, for use as its New York City headquarters. GM's offices were relocated to 3 Columbus Circle in 1927, and 224 West 57th Street became known as the Argonaut Building.

GM continued to use the Argonaut Building as a showroom, opening a Cadillac and LaSalle showroom on the ground level in 1935. At that point, vehicle elevators between the basement and the third floor were installed. According to the building's subsequent owners, the first built-in car radios were sold inside the showroom in 1938. During the 1940s, the Automobile Merchants Association took space in the building, as did the United States Office of War Information and the Voice of America. The Voice and the Office of War Information had leased all of the office floors during World War II, but GM retook most of the space after the end of the war. The second and third floors of the Argonaut Building became office space in 1964, and the ground-level showroom operated through the late 1970s. Although General Motors completed a new headquarters and showroom building at 767 Fifth Avenue in 1968, GM stated that it would retain the Argonaut Building after the completion of the new structure. By the 1970s, GM had moved its divisions in the Argonaut Building to other locations.

=== Hearst and other office tenants ===
Hearst Communications started to lease space in the Argonaut Building in 1975, and purchased the property outright two years later in July 1977. The LPC designated 224 West 57th Street, along with the U.S. Rubber Company Building and the Studebaker Building in Brooklyn, as official city landmarks on December 19, 2000. The terracotta facade was repaired and painted with a white coating in 2006. Although Christopher Gray of The New York Times said conservators usually disapproved of applying coating to terracotta, the facade had already been coated previously, so the modification was approved by the LPC. Also in 2006, Hearst moved its headquarters one block west to the Hearst Tower, following the completion of that building.

224 West 57th Street was leased by foreign developer M1 Real Estate in 2008 for 99 years. At the time, Gensler was already planning to renovate the building for $45 million; the building was thus vacated, with ground-floor tenant Duane Reade moving out. A branch of TD Bank signed a lease for the ground floor space in 2009, and M1 purchased 224 West 57th Street from Hearst for $85 million the next year. Gensler's renovation was completed in 2011 and received a Leadership in Energy and Environmental Design (LEED) Gold award from the U.S. Green Building Council. This made 224 West 57th Street one of a few buildings over 100 years old to receive LEED Gold certification.

George Soros's Open Society Foundations leased all the office space at the Argonaut Building in September 2011, with the former ground-floor showroom housing a bank by that time. Tirmizi Campbell subsequently renovated the interior space for OSF's use, with the project being completed in 2013. Eretz Group purchased 224 West 57th Street from M1 Real Estate in 2015 for $214 million, and the owners secured a $145 million loan for the building in 2018. By mid-2022, Open Society Foundations was still the only office tenant in the Argonaut Building. Soros Fund Management moved to foreclose on the building's mortgage in April 2024. That June, the delinquent mortgages on the building were sold by Deutsche Bank and another German lender to the George Soros Family office. After Eretz Group attempted to repay the mortgage for two years, Soros Fund Management announced in mid-2026 that the mortgage would be sold at auction.

== Critical reception ==
Shortly after the Peerless and Demarest buildings opened, Architects' and Builders' Magazine wrote that the designs complemented the Broadway Tabernacle "in a harmonious and satisfactory manner". The magazine wrote that the Gothic designs differed from each other "in every detail", but "in spirit conveys the same idea". In 2007, Gray wrote in The New York Times that the facade, which complemented the long-demolished Broadway Tabernacle, "seems a bit out of place amid the traffic at one of the busiest intersections in Midtown".

== See also ==
- List of buildings and structures on Broadway in Manhattan
- List of New York City Designated Landmarks in Manhattan from 14th to 59th Streets
