= Georgia Timken Fry =

American painter (1864–1921)

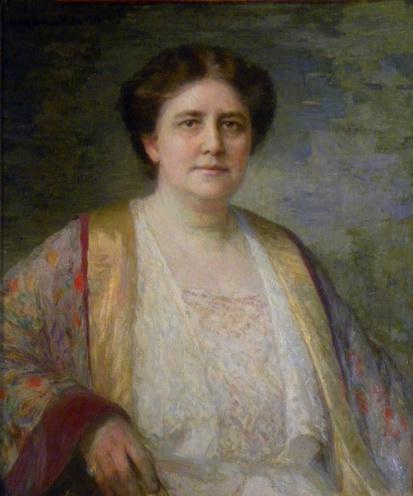
- portrait by Helen Watson Phelps
- Born: Georgianna Timken; February 3, 1864; St. Louis
- Died: September 8, 1921 (aged 57); Beijing
- Occupation: Painter
- Spouse(s): John Hemming Fry
- Parent(s): Henry Timken

Georgia Timken Fry (3 February 1864 – 8 September 1921) was an American painter and heiress. Her work focused on landscapes, particularly depictions of sheep.

She was born Georgianna Timken on 3 February 1864 in St. Louis, Missouri, one of nine children of Henry Timken, founder of the Timken Roller Bearing Company, and Fredericka Heinzelman.

She attended Lindenwood College in St. Charles, Missouri and the St. Louis School of Fine Arts. She married one of her instructors at the latter school, the painter John Hemming Fry, in 1891. The couple moved to Paris, where she studied under a number of artists, including Harry Thompson, Aime Morot, Jean-Charles Cazin, and August Friedrich Schenck.

In 1916, the Frys, along with painter Lawton S. Parker, founded Rodin Studios, a cooperative apartment building intended to provide housing and studio space for artists. The building, designed by Cass Gilbert, opened the next year, with the Frys occupying a large apartment on the top floor.

While on a trip to Beijing with a friend, Georgia Timken Fry died of the bubonic plague on 8 September 1921.
