= The Best of Both Worlds (musical) =

- Music: Diedre Murray
- Lyrics: Randy Weiner
- Book: Randy Weiner; Diane Paulus
- Basis: A Winter's Tale by William Shakespeare
- Productions: 2004 Off-Broadway; 2009 Cambridge

The Best of Both Worlds is a musical with book and lyrics by Randy Weiner, music by Diedre Murray, and additional scenes by Diane Paulus, loosely based on William Shakespeare's A Winter's Tale.

== Productions ==
The show played off-Broadway at the Women's Project Theatre. Directed by Diane Paulus, it featured sets by Mark Wedland, costumes by Gabriel Berry, and lighting by Kevin Adams. This production played from December 2, 2004, to January 2, 2005.

The Best of Both Worlds also played at the American Repertory Theater in Cambridge, Massachusetts from November 21, 2009 to January 3, 2010.
