= Richard Kimmel =

American theatre director

- Occupation: Theatrical producer
- Organization: The Box
- Notable work: Schwarzwald

Richard Kimmel is a New York City-based theatre director, writer, and theatrical producer. He is executive director of The Box, a venue for theater, music, and nightlife on the Lower East Side of Manhattan, and artistic director of Cannon Company, a performing ensemble.

== Biography ==
Kimmel is a graduate of Columbia University's Master of Fine Arts program in Directing.

He has created and directed live performances and special events such as Pandora (The Box), a light and video show for Jennifer Hudson's New York concert debut One Night Only: Dreamgirls (Hammerstein Ballroom), and Schwarzwald (Roseland). In 2007, Schwarzwald was made into a feature film, Schwarzwald: The Movie You Can Dance To, written and directed by Kimmel. The film, which has no spoken words, is based on music and footage filmed at the 2006 Black Party in the Roseland Ballroom, noted for its sexually charged shows. Following premieres in New York (NewFest) and Los Angeles (OutFest Platinum Selection), the film screened in Paris, Amsterdam, and Montreal.

Kimmel's other New York directing and producing credits include Puss (the Performing Garage), Pleasuredome I and II (Combustive Arts), Witches' MacBeth (HERE, Angel Orensanz Center, WAH Center), and Three Sisters (28th Street Theater), The Secret Agent (Dactyl). He also produced and directed the Pleasure Blister cabaret series at downtown New York City nightclub Filter 14, and the New Lost City 2004 New Year's Eve extravaganza at the Lunatarium in Dumbo, Brooklyn.

His international and regional credits include The Tooth of Crime (New Grove Theatre, London), Endgame (Actor's Workshop, Boston), American Buffalo (14th Street Playhouse, Atlanta), Twelfth Night (Alliance Theater, Atlanta), and The Comedy of Errors (Theatre Emory, Atlanta).

For many years, Kimmel has been an associate with The Wooster Group, working in a variety of roles ranging from producing the Performing Garage's "Visiting Artist Series" and "Emerging Artist Series" to helping secure funding for special projects. He was assistant director of the Group's 2002 repertory production To You, The Birdie! (Phèdre), and has toured to more than 20 cities internationally with the show, including London, Paris, Berlin, Amsterdam, Barcelona, and Istanbul.

Kimmel co-founded the New York City performance-art theater The Box on Valentine's Day in 2007 with partners Simon Hammerstein (the grandson of famed lyricist and playwright Oscar Hammerstein II) and Randy Weiner. The club, which The New York Times said "was labeled the savior of hip Manhattan nightlife" when it opened, was the subject of controversies in 2008. The extreme nature of some of the club's acts were criticized, and noise complaints lead to the local community board recommending that the club's liquor license renewal be denied. (The license was ultimately renewed.) In 2011, Kimmel and his partners opened The Box Soho in London.

Kimmel is a member of the Lincoln Center Director's Lab, and recipient of awards from the NEH, the Princess Grace Foundation, and the New York State Council on the Arts.
