= Diane Paulus =

American theater and opera director (born 1966)

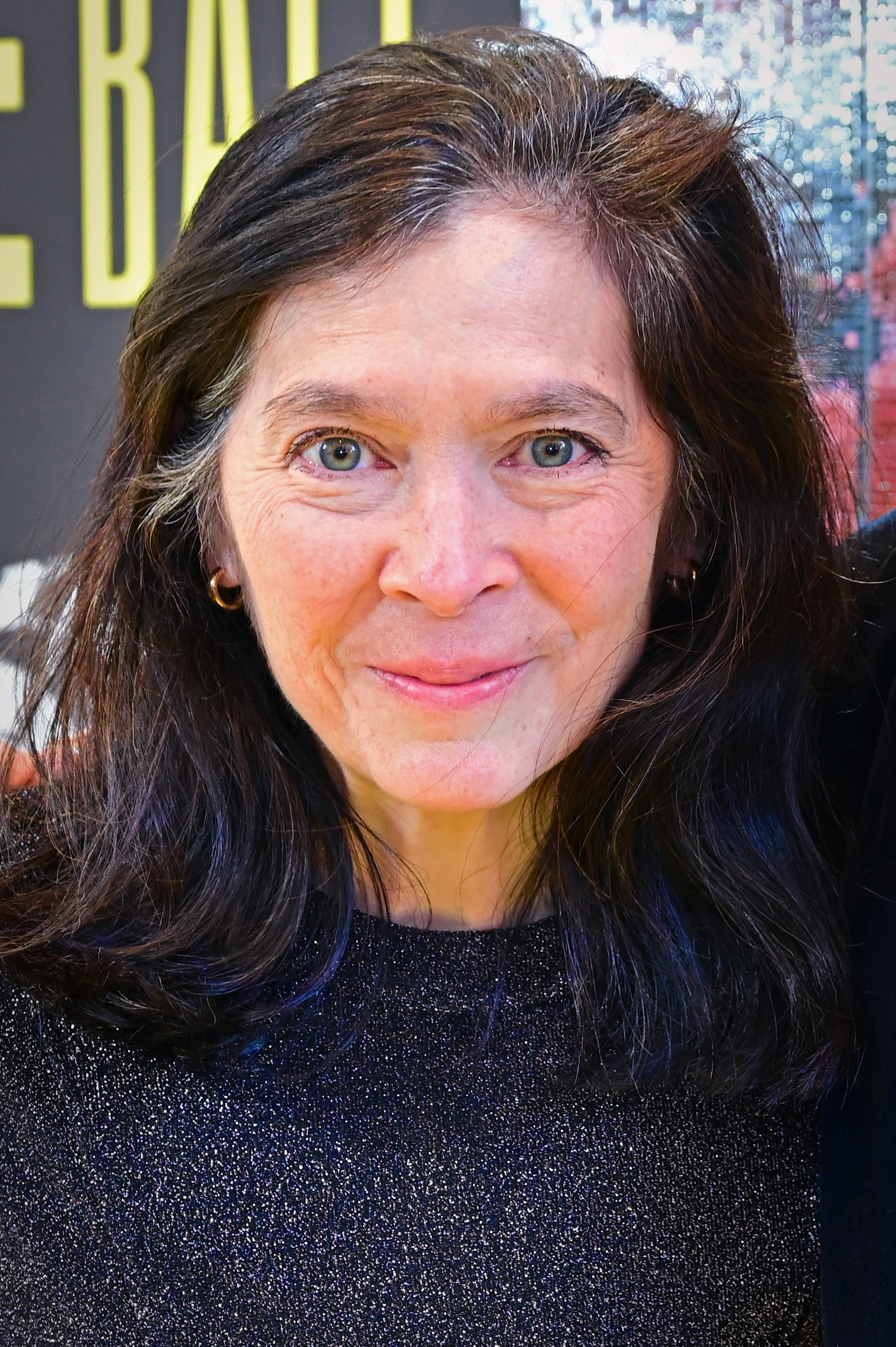
- Paulus in 2026
- Born: Diane Marie Paulus; 1966 (age 59–60); New York City, U.S.
- Education: Harvard University (BA); Columbia University (MFA)
- Occupation: Director
- Spouse: Randy Weiner (m. 1995)
- Children: 2

Diane Marie Paulus (born 1966) is an American theater and opera director who is currently the Terrie and Bradley Bloom Artistic Director of the American Repertory Theater at Harvard University. Paulus was nominated for the Tony Award for Best Direction of a Musical for her revivals of Hair and The Gershwins' Porgy and Bess, and won the award in 2013 for her revival of Pippin. In 2025, Paulus directed Masquerade, an immersive production of Andrew Lloyd Webber's Phantom of the Opera at the former site of Lee's Art Shop. Most recently, Masquerade earned Paulus a 2026 Drama Desk Award for Outstanding Creative Collaboration.

She received the 2009 Harvard College Women's Leadership Award and the Columbia University IAL Diamond Award. She was selected for the 2014 Time 100, Time magazine's annual list of the 100 most influential people in the world; as one of Variety's "Trailblazing Women in Entertainment for 2014"; Boston magazine's "50 Thought Leaders of 2014"; and Boston magazine's 2018 and 2020 "100 Most Influential People in Boston".

== Early life and education ==
Paulus was born in New York City in 1966, the daughter of a Japanese mother and an American father. Her parents met while her father, a New York television producer, was stationed in Japan after World War II.

She attended the Brearley School, studied dance at New York City Ballet, and trained in classical piano. In 1988, she graduated magna cum laude from Radcliffe College with a Bachelor of Arts degree in social studies and as a member of Phi Beta Kappa. She then earned a master's degree from the Columbia University School of the Arts.

== Career ==
Paulus and her husband, Randy Weiner, along with a few other theater school graduates established a small theater troupe in New York City called Project 400 Theatre Group. With Project 400, Paulus and Weiner specialized in creating avant-garde musical productions which married classic theater and modern music. Paulus's first production with the group was a rock version of The Tempest. Other productions included an R&B Phaedra and a hip-hop Lohengrin. In collaboration with Weiner, Paulus co-created The Donkey Show, a disco adaptation of A Midsummer Night's Dream which ran off-Broadway from 1999 to 2019. Critics cited the production as an example of a trend in which edgy avant-garde theater had become fashionably mainstream.

In May 2008, Paulus was named the artistic director of the American Repertory Theater, which is affiliated with Harvard University. The American Repertory Theater chose Paulus after Anna D. Shapiro, the August: Osage County director, decided not to take the job to replace Robert Woodruff. Paulus's first production was a revival of The Donkey Show, written by Paulus and her husband Randy Weiner. Paulus previously taught courses at Columbia University and Yale University.

Paulus directed the 2009 revival of Hair (musical) which ran on Broadway for 519 performances following a successful 2007 concert production and fully staged production at the Delacorte Theatre, which originally started Jonathan Groff as Claude (who would eventually be recast with the late Gavin Creel for the Broadway production citing scheduling challenges). She received extensive praise for her direction in the review and would be nominated for a Tony Award for Best Direction of a Musical.

In 2010, Paulus was selected by the magazine American Theatre as one of the 25 theater artists who were asked to share their vision of coming developments in the next 25 years in the theater world. In her comments she talks about her goal to "revolutionize" the theatre experience by making it more interactive, letting the audience participate and making theatre content more "open source". She has also argued that theater has the power to make people more compassionate and cooperative citizens.

Also in 2010, Paulus directed Il mondo della luna (The World on the Moon), an opera by Joseph Haydn, in the Hayden Planetarium at the American Museum of Natural History. A Gotham Chamber Opera, in partnership with the Museum and in association with American Repertory Theater, Paulus's production fused live opera and stargazing using the 180-degree dome with projections courtesy of NASA.

Paulus directed a concert production of Paul Simon's The Capeman at the Delacorte Theater in Central Park for the Public Theater in August 2010.

In 2011 she staged a production of the Gershwin opera Porgy and Bess at the American Repertory Theater, which moved to Broadway in 2012. The production was nominated for 9 awards in the 2012 Tony Awards, winning Best Revival of a Musical and Best Performance by a Leading Actress in a Musical for Audra McDonald. The production ran through September 23, 2012. In advance of this production, renowned composer and lyricist Stephen Sondheim expressed his dismay on her proposed edits and directorial choices in a letter to The New York Times.

In 2012, Paulus directed a production of Pippin for the American Repertory Theater. She cast a woman, Patina Miller, in the part of Leading Player, originated by Ben Vereen. The production opened on Broadway at the Music Box Theatre on Broadway, on April 25, 2013. Paulus won the Tony Award for Best Direction of a Musical, becoming the third woman to win the award after Julie Taymor in 1998 and Susan Stroman in 2001. The production also received Tony Awards for Best Revival of a Musical, Best Performance by an Actress in a Leading Role in a Musical for Miller, and Best Performance by an Actress in a Featured Role in a Musical for Andrea Martin.

In 2014, at the American Repertory Theater Paulus directed the American premier of the musical Finding Neverland, based on the film of the same name. Tony winner Roger Bart was announced to star, but left the project over creative differences. At the American Repertory Theater, Michael McGrath replaced Bart as Charles Frohman, a role played on Broadway by Kelsey Grammer. Finding Neverland was produced on Broadway by Harvey Weinstein and played the Lunt-Fontanne Theatre for 565 performances.

In 2015, Paulus directed the new musical Waitress, based on the 2007 film of the same name, written by Adrienne Shelly. The music was written by six-time Grammy Award nominated singer-songwriter Sara Bareilles. Pulitzer Prize winning playwright Paula Vogel was announced to write the book of the musical, but left the project. The production was notable after it moved to Broadway and became the first Broadway musical with an all female creative team. The musical was nominated for four Tony Awards, winning none. It was also nominated for the Grammy Award for Best Musical Theater Album, losing to The Color Purple. Waitress played on Broadway at the Brooks Atkinson Theatre in April 2016 at the Brooks Atkinson Theatre, closing in January 2020 after 1,544 performances. It completed a United States National Tour and a run in London's West End in 2020.

In 2018, Paulus directed the new musical Jagged Little Pill, based on the Grammy Award-winning 1995 album by Alanis Morissette. It incorporated selections from Morissette's catalogue and new material written for the show. Its creative team included Academy Award winner Diablo Cody, Tony Award Winner Tom Kitt, and Olivier Award winner Sidi Larbi Cherkaoui. Jagged Little Pill debuted at the American Repertory Theater in May 2018 and opened at the Broadhurst Theatre in December 2019.

In 2020, Griffin Matthews spoke out on his racism-laden experience during the production of his musical Invisible Thread directed by Paulus at Second Stage in 2015, which ran the previous year at the A.R.T. under the title Witness Uganda. She responded with a statement published in The Boston Globe.

On November 19, 2021, Paulus was hired by Spire Animation Studios to make her feature directorial debut Century Goddess from a screenplay by Bisha K. Ali and Starrah writing original songs.

Paulus directed the West End production of Jagged Little Pill when it transferred to London in November 2022.

In collaboration with Weiner, Paulus co-created Masquerade, an immersive production of Phantom of the Opera. Paulus directed the production, which opened in September 2025 and is considered the world's first immersive musical. In April 2026, Paulus' creative leadership on Masquerade was recognized with a Drama Desk Special Award for Outstanding Creative Collaboration.

== Personal life ==
On October 1, 1995, she married fellow Harvard graduate Randy Weiner. They have two daughters. They live on the top three floors of a townhouse on the Upper West Side of Manhattan.

== Controversy ==
The playwright and actor Griffin Matthews called Paulus, director of his work Witness Uganda, an "Amy Cooper", an expression meaning a white person in the theater industry who demeans the work and contributions of African-Americans. On June 1, 2020, he said on Twitter:

The thing about [Broadway] Amy Cooper is, she is a liberal, she is an artistic director, she is a Tony winner, she is a producer, she teaches at Harvard, she is charismatic, she is an excellent public speaker and fundraiser, she puts on pretty dresses and speaks eloquently about how much she cares about diversity and inclusion. She has made her entire career about that. She works with black people. She believes she loves black people. She buys their work. And then, behind closed doors, she steals it.

Paulus apologized on A.R.T.'s website on June 4 in a statement that was picked up by Playbill, the Pittsburgh Post-Gazette, and other outlets.

The A.R.T.'s diverse production of 1776, which Paulus co-directed, was the subject of criticism by cast member Sara Porkalob after it moved to Broadway in 2022. Later, Porkalob also apologized.

== Awards ==
Year	Award	Category	Work	Result
2009	Drama Desk Award	Outstanding Director of a Musical	Hair	Nominated
2009	Tony Award	Best Direction of a Musical	Hair	Nominated
2011	Elliot Norton Award	Outstanding Director, Large Theater	Hair, Johnny Baseball, Prometheus Bound	Won
2012	Tony Award	Best Direction of a Musical	The Gershwins' Porgy and Bess	Nominated
2012	Drama League Award	Outstanding Direction of a Musical	The Gershwins' Porgy and Bess	Won
2013	Drama Desk Award	Outstanding Director of a Musical	Pippin	Won
2013	Tony Award	Best Direction of a Musical	Pippin	Won
2013	Outer Critics Circle Award	Outstanding Director of a Musical	Pippin	Won
2017	Elliot Norton Award	Prize for Sustained Excellence		Won
2020	Tony Award	Best Direction of a Musical	Jagged Little Pill	Nominated
2026	Drama Desk Award	Special Award for Outstanding Creative Collaboration	Masquerade	Won
2026	Outer Critics Circle Award	Outstanding Direction of a Musical	Masquerade	Pending

== Theater ==
- Another Country by James Baldwin at Riverside Church
- Turandot: Rumble for the Ring at the Bay Street Theater
- The Golden Mickeys for Disney Creative Entertainment
- The Karaoke Show, an adaptation of Comedy of Errors set in a karaoke bar, produced by Jordan Roth Productions
- Running Man by jazz composer and frequent collaborator Diedre Murray and poet Cornelius Eady
- Brutal Imagination
- At Chicago Opera Theater: Le Nozze Di Figaro, Turn Of The Screw, Cosi Fan Tutte, and all three Monteverdi opera, Il Ritorno D'Ulisse In Patria, L'Incoronazione Di Poppea, and Orfeo
- Amaluna the 2012 Cirque Du Soleil touring show
- Death and the Powers: The Robots' Opera, an opera written by Tod Machover incorporating robots on stage

=== American Repertory Theater ===
- Best of Both Worlds, a gospel/R&B adaptation of A Winter's Tale produced by Music-Theatre Group and The Women's Project. Co-written by Diedre Murray. It was revived in 2010 at the A.R.T.
- Johnny Baseball, a 2010 musical at the A.R.T.
- Prometheus Bound, written by Steven Sater with music by Serj Tankian, a rock musical adaption of the 5th century BC Greek play by the same name, performed at A.R.T.'s club venue Oberon in 2011
- Death and the Powers: The Robots' Opera, by Tod Machover, developed with the MIT Media Lab, and performed at the Emerson Cutler Majestic Theater in 2011 in collaboration with Chicago Opera Theater and in association with Opera Boston
- The Gershwins' Porgy and Bess, a musical adaption of the 1935 opera Porgy and Bess.
- Pippin, a 2013 revival which moved on to Broadway and was nominated for 10 Tony Awards, of which it won four, including the award for best revival of a musical
- Witness Uganda, a show depicting an American aid worker in Uganda coming to terms with the realities of the situation on the ground.
- Finding Neverland, an original musical with music and lyrics by Gary Barlow and Eliot Kennedy and a book by James Graham that premiered at A.R.T. in 2014. Inspired by the 1998 play The Man Who Was Peter Pan by Allan Knee
- Crossing, a new American opera written by Matthew Aucoin and inspired by Walt Whitman's diary from during his time as a nurse during the Civil War
- Waitress, the first Broadway musical with an all-female creative team, and nominee for four Tony Awards.
- In the Body of the World, a stage adaption by Eve Ensler of her 2013 memoir by the same name
- The White Card, a world premiere produced in association with ArtsEmerson by Claudia Rankine
- Jagged Little Pill, a new musical taking the music of Alanis Morissette's album of the same title, written by Diablo Cody confronting contentious issues of contemporary American Society
- ExtraOrdinary, a 2018 celebration of the prior ten years of musical theater at the A.R.T.
- Gloria: A Life, about Gloria Steinem and the women she partnered with to fight for equality, by Emily Mann, in 2020

=== Off-Broadway ===
- Invisible Thread (formerly Witness Uganda)
- Swimming with Watermelons, created in association with Project 400, the theater company she co-founded with her husband Randy Weiner.
- The Obie award-winning Eli's Comin, featuring the music and lyrics of Laura Nyro.
- The 40th Anniversary Concert Production of Hair at the Delacorte Theater in Central Park for the Public Theater as well as the subsequent production of Hair on Broadway which won a Tony Award for Best Revival of a Musical and for which she was nominated for a Tony Award for Best Director.
- Masquerade an immersive production of Andrew Lloyd Webber’s The Phantom of the Opera, for which Paulus won a 2026 Special Drama Desk Award.
