= Randy Weiner =

American dramatist (born 1965)

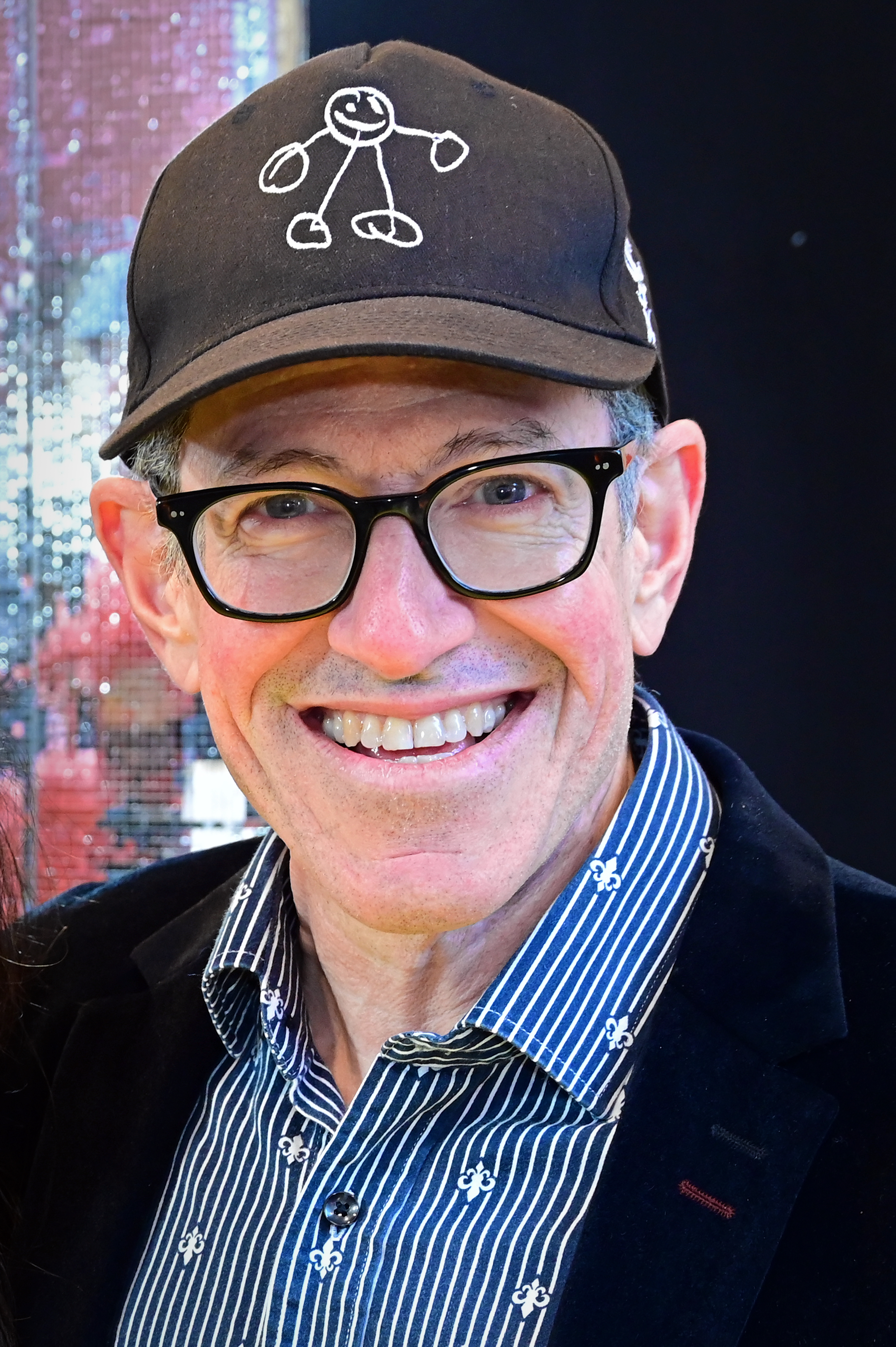
- Weiner in 2026
- Born: Edward Randall Weiner; March 10, 1965 (age 61); United States
- Education: Harvard University
- Occupations: Playwright, producer
- Spouse: Diane Paulus

Randy Weiner (born March 10, 1965) is an American playwright, producer and theater and nightclub owner. Weiner co-wrote the Off-Broadway musical The Donkey Show and, as one-third of EMURSIVE, produced the Drama Desk Award winning New York premiere of Punchdrunk's Sleep No More. He is co-owner of NYC "theater of varieties" The Box and The Box Soho. His creation The Stranger was a Time Out New York 2023 "Best of the City" award winner. Most recently, Weiner co-created and executive-produced the Drama Desk Award-winning Masquerade, an immersive production of Phantom of the Opera and nightlife venue located at the former site of Lee's Art Shop.

Weiner is a founder and partner of Outside The Box Amusements (OTBA), a theatrical production company which creates, manages and produces unique experiences. These experiences include Come Alive! The Greatest Showman Circus Spectacular on London’s West End and Usher’s Residency in Las Vegas.

Weiner is the creator of Queen of the Night at the Paramount Hotel in New York City, and recently served as the dramaturge for Cirque du Soleil's Amaluna. He was named one of Modern Luxury Manhattan's 75 Most Influential People In The Arts. He was named one of BlooLoop’s Power 10 most influential people in immersive visitor attractions.

== Personal life ==
Weiner was born Edward Randall Weiner, the son of a New York banker and lawyer. He graduated cum laude from Harvard University. On October 1, 1995, he married fellow theater arts graduate Diane Paulus.

== Career ==
Weiner and Paulus along with a few other theater school graduates established a small theater troupe in New York City called Project 400 Theatre Group. With Project 400, Weiner and Paulus specialized in creating avant-garde musical productions which married classic theater and modern music. These included a rock version of The Tempest, an R&B Phaedra and a hip-hop Lohengrin.

In collaboration with Paulus, Weiner co-created The Donkey Show, a disco adaptation of A Midsummer Night's Dream which ran off-Broadway from 1999 to 2005 and was revived in 2009 for Paulus' first production as director of the American Repertory Theater. Critics cited the production as an exemplary of a trend in which edgy avant-garde theater had become fashionably mainstream.

In February 2007, Weiner cofounded (with partners Richard Kimmel and Simon Hammerstein) the Box theater on the Lower East Side of Manhattan. The cabaret theater has drawn attention for its risque burlesque acts.

In January 2014, Weiner and partner Aby Rosen unveiled the Diamond Horseshoe supper club in midtown Manhattan. Once presided over by legendary nightlife impresario Billy Rose, the venue has undergone a $20 million renovation and plays host to Weiner's latest immersive spectacle, Queen of the Night.

In April 2023, Weiner opened The Stranger, a nightlife experience heralded by Time Out.

In 2025, again collaborating with Paulus, Weiner co-created and executive produced Masquerade, an immersive production of Andrew Lloyd Webber's The Phantom of the Opera. Masquerade opened on September 29, 2025, running eight weekly performances. The production received a 2026 Drama Desk Special Award.

Weiner has served on the Advisory Committee on the Arts at Harvard University. He has guest lectured on theater arts at Columbia University, Barnard College, New York University, and Yale.
