= Demarest Building =

Former building in Manhattan, New York

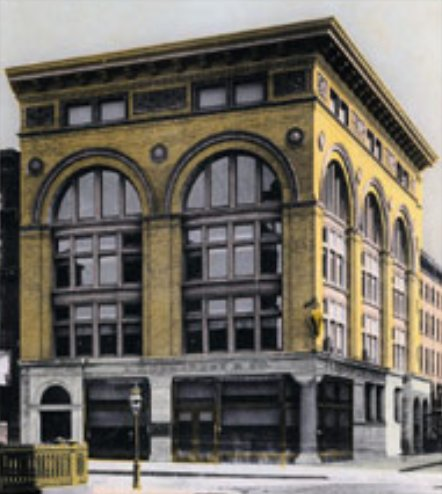
- gelatinous print, 1891
- Interactive map of the Demarest Building area

General information
- Location: 339 Fifth Ave, New York City, United States
- Coordinates: 40°44′52″N 73°59′05″W
- Construction started: 1889
- Demolished: 2021
- Owner: Pi Capital Partners

Height
- Height: four stories

Design and construction
- Architect: Renwick, Aspinwall & Russell

The Demarest Building was a four-story structure at 339 Fifth Avenue in Midtown Manhattan, New York City, designed by Renwick, Aspinwall & Russell and constructed for coachbuilder Aaron T. Demarest. An 1893 fire destroyed property in the building, which was later used for other purposes.

== Description ==
The Demarest Building was located on the northeast corner of Fifth Avenue and 33rd Street in Midtown Manhattan, just east of the Empire State Building and across the street from the Hotel Waldorf. The building had been compared stylistically to Carnegie Hall. The building was designed in a modified Beaux Arts style.

== History ==
A July 26, 1893 fire destroyed property at the building. It was originally used as a showroom for luxury horse carriages. The world's first electric elevator was installed there. It was thereafter fragmented into retail units. The building was later converted to other uses.

By 2015, developer Pi Capital Partners planned to replace the building and neighboring structures with a new residential tower. In 2019, Pi Capital filed plans for a 26-story mixed-use development on the site of the Demarest Building, with 82 apartments. This prompted preservationists and groups, including the Greenwich Village Society for Historic Preservation, to petition the New York City Landmarks Preservation Commission (LPC) to designate the building as an official city landmark, thereby protecting it from demolition. The LPC expressed concern that the building's exterior had been altered too frequently throughout its history and the old building was not saved. As of 2021, it is being replaced by a 21-story, 82-unit mixed-use building with commercial space at the base and up to five residential units on each floor.

"Unfortunately, despite all its history, the Landmarks Preservation Commission determined that the structure had undergone too many alterations throughout its life to qualify for any sort of designation." Demolition commenced in 2022.

== Sources ==
- Kane, Joseph Nathan (1997). Famous First Facts (Fifth ed.). The H. W. Wilson Company. ISBN 0-8242-0930-3. "The first electric elevator successfully operated was installed in 1889 by Otis Brothers and Company in the Demarest Building, Fifth Avenue and 33rd Street, New York City."
- Madsen, Axel (2002). John Jacob Astor. Wiley Press. ISBN 9780471009351.
- Martinez, Mark Anthony (2009). The Myth of the Free Market. Kumarian Press. ISBN 9781565492677.
