= The Donkey Show (musical) =

- A Midsummer Night's Disco
- Music: various
- Lyrics: various
- Book: Diane Paulus and Randy Weiner
- Basis: A Midsummer Night's Dream by William Shakespeare
- Productions: 1999 Off-Broadway; 2001 London; 2009 Cambridge

The Donkey Show: A Midsummer Night's Disco is a theatrical adaptation of Shakespeare's A Midsummer Night's Dream. The production, created in a disco-era style, was written by Diane Paulus and her husband Randy Weiner and the members of Project 400, Emily Hellstrom, Jordin Ruderman, Rachel Murdy and Anna Wilson. It first appeared Off-Broadway, opening August 18, 1999. The show subsequently ran for six years including venues in England, Scotland, France and Spain. After a successful run at the Edinburgh Festival the Donkey Show came to London for an eight-month run in London’s West End (Hanover Grand). The London show was produced by David Babani and Graham Kentsley. Rob Goodmonson (NYC) played the part of the DJ in the UK production. In 2009, the show was revived by the American Repertory Theater in Cambridge, Massachusetts, for which Paulus is artistic director. The club/theater space used in Cambridge is called OBERON, after the king of the fairies in A Midsummer Night's Dream. The show ran in that space until September 2019.
