= Rodin Studios =

Office building in Manhattan, New York

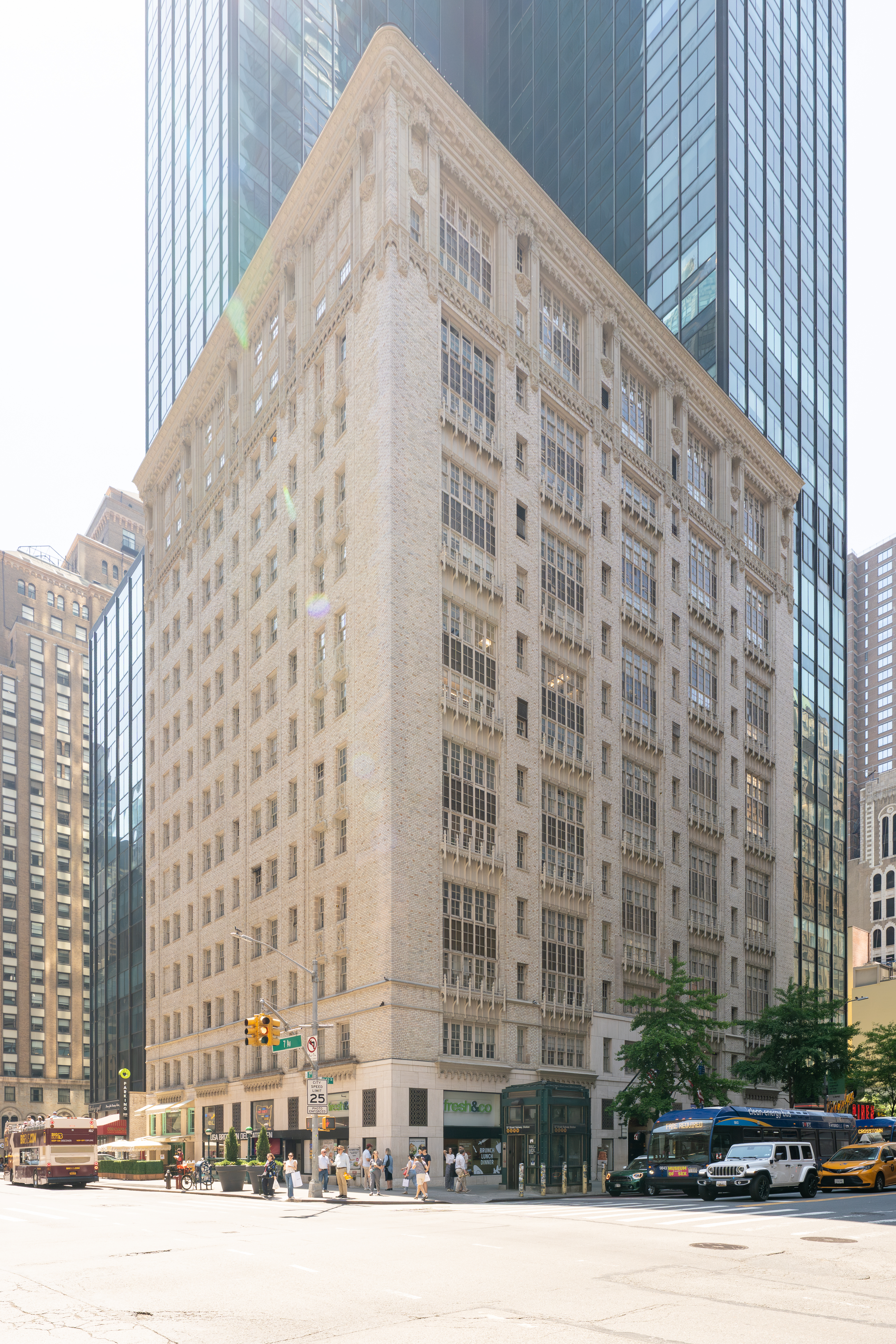
- Interactive map of the Rodin Studios area

General information
- Type: Office
- Architectural style: French Gothic
- Location: 200 West 57th Street, Manhattan, New York, United States
- Coordinates: 40°45′56″N 73°58′50″W
- Groundbreaking: 1916
- Opened: 1917
- Owner: The Feil Organization

Height
- Architectural: 162 ft (49 m)
- Roof: 152 ft (46 m)

Technical details
- Structural system: reinforced concrete
- Floor count: 15
- Floor area: 135,051 square feet (12,546.6 m^{2})
- Lifts/elevators: 3

Design and construction
- Architect: Cass Gilbert

New York City Landmark
- Designated: February 16, 1988
- Reference no.: 1571

The Rodin Studios, also known as 200 West 57th Street, is an office building at Seventh Avenue and 57th Street in Midtown Manhattan in New York City. It was designed by Cass Gilbert in the French Gothic style and built from 1916 to 1917. Named after French sculptor Auguste Rodin, the building is one of several in Manhattan that were built in the early 20th century as both studios and residences for artists.

The Rodin Studios is 15 stories tall with a superstructure made of reinforced concrete. The main facades are clad in polychrome buff and gray brick, and contain French Renaissance-inspired trim made of terracotta and iron. The brickwork of the facade contains both broad and narrow bays, while the northern side facing 57th Street contains large studio windows. The double-height studios, now subdivided, were mostly on the 57th Street side, while the smaller residences were at the back of the building.

The Rodin Studios was developed by the corporation of the same name, which operated the building until 1942. By the 1960s, the building was converted for office use. The Rodin Studios was designated a city landmark by the New York City Landmarks Preservation Commission in 1988. The building was restored in 2008 by Zaskorski & Notaro Architects, and is owned by The Feil Organization.

== Site ==
The Rodin Studios is on the southwestern corner of 57th Street and Seventh Avenue, two blocks south of Central Park in the Midtown Manhattan neighborhood of New York City. It occupies the addresses 894–900 Seventh Avenue and 200 West 57th Street. The site measures about 100 by 115 feet (30 by 35 m).

The Rodin Studios abuts 888 Seventh Avenue to the south and west; it faces the Osborne to the north, The Briarcliffe to the northeast, and Carnegie Hall and Carnegie Hall Tower to the east. Other nearby buildings include the American Fine Arts Society (also known as the Art Students League of New York building) and Central Park Tower to the northwest; Alwyn Court and the Louis H. Chalif Normal School of Dancing to the northeast; and 218 and 224 West 57th Street to the west. Right outside the building are entrances to the New York City Subway's 57th Street–Seventh Avenue station, served by the N, Q, R, and W trains.

The Rodin Studios is part of an artistic hub developed around the two blocks of West 57th Street from Sixth Avenue west to Broadway during the late 19th and early 20th centuries, following the opening of Carnegie Hall in 1891. Several buildings in the area were constructed as residences for artists and musicians, such as 130 and 140 West 57th Street, the Osborne, and the Rodin Studios, as well as the demolished Sherwood Studios and Rembrandt. In addition, the area contained the headquarters of organizations such as the American Fine Arts Society, the Lotos Club, and the American Society of Civil Engineers at 218 West 57th Street. The Rodin Studios' site was previously occupied by the Inverness, a seven-story brick-and-stone apartment building that had been developed in 1881.

== Architecture ==
The Rodin Studios building was designed by Cass Gilbert in the French Gothic style. The Wells Construction Company was the general contractor, while Hinkle Iron Works was the iron contractor. The Federal Terra Cotta Company provided the terracotta, Harrison & Meyer constructed the cement floors and hallways, the W. G. Cornell Company was the plumbing and heating contractor, and the Barker Painting Company decorated the interior. The building was developed by the corporation of the same name, which in turn was named for the French sculptor Auguste Rodin. The building's design was generally intended to complement the American Fine Arts Society building across 57th Street.

The Rodin Studios contains 14 full stories as well as a partial 15th floor. It is 162 feet (49 m) tall and has its main roof at 152 feet (46 m) above ground. The Rodin Studios does not occupy its entire lot; rather, it is shaped like the letter "F". The northern facade on 57th Street fills the entire 115-foot (35 m) length of the lot. On the eastern side of the building, a wing extends south along Seventh Avenue for about 92 feet (28 m), while at the center, a shorter wing extends south for about 76 feet (23 m).

=== Facade ===
The Rodin Studios' facade is clad largely in buff brick alternating with gray or burnt-gold highlights. It contains French Renaissance-inspired trim made of terracotta and iron, as well as ornamental brickwork. The 57th Street and Seventh Avenue elevations, or sides, both contain alternating wide and narrow bays. The 57th Street side has five wide bays while the Seventh Avenue side has four. The southern and western elevations contain sash windows within a buff-brick facade. Only a small part of the western elevation is visible along 57th Street, as that wall faces another building. At the southernmost end of the Seventh Avenue elevation, there is an ornate arched gateway, which is a service entrance to the ground-level restaurant there. The ornamental detail includes screens over the studio windows, as well as carvings of animals and human grotesques.

At ground level, the main entrance is in the central bay on 57th Street. The other wide bays on 57th Street and Seventh Avenue have storefronts and the narrow bays contain gold-colored metal grilles. There are corbel tables above each of the ground-level wide bays as well as a string course above the third floor.

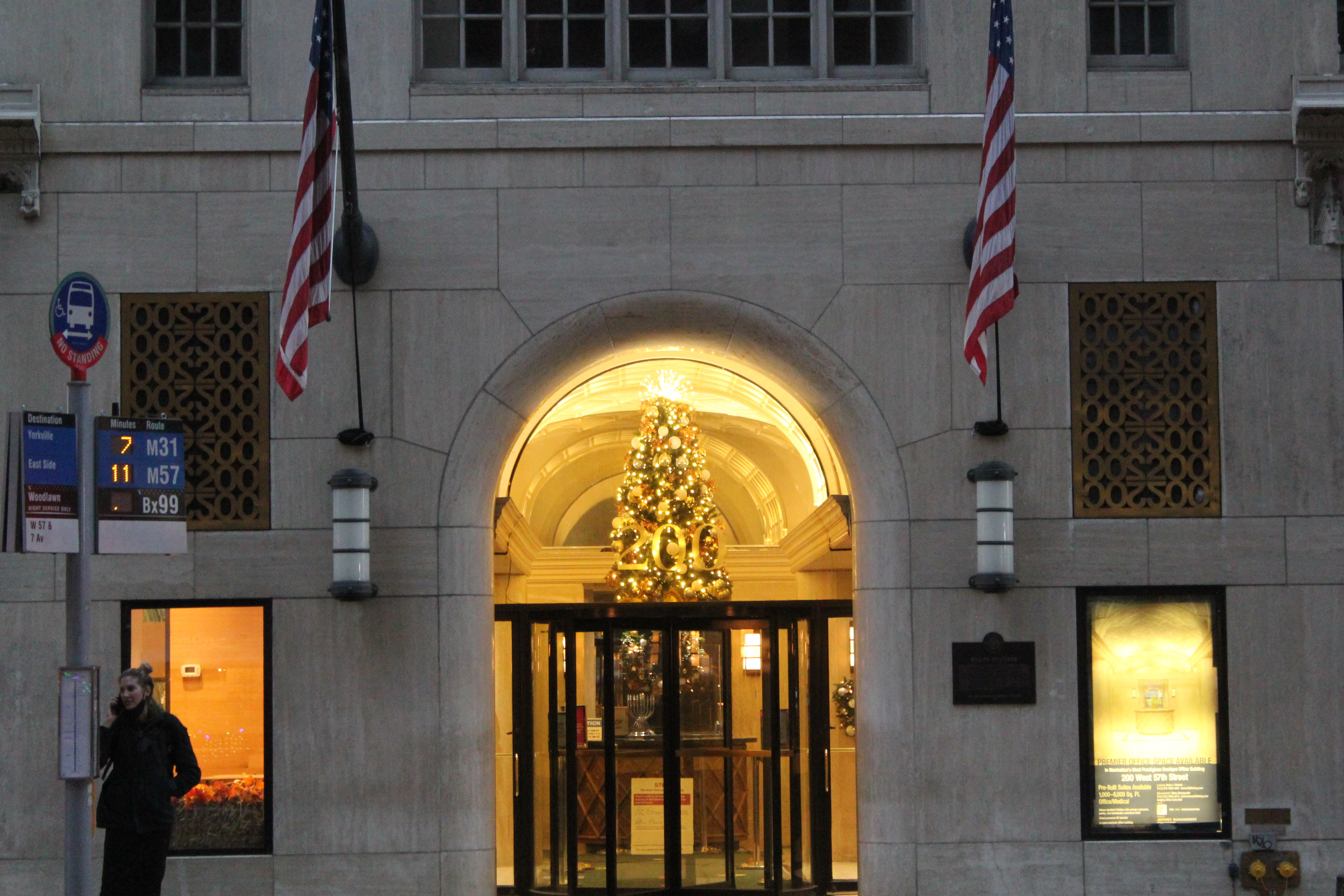
Main entrance on 57th Street

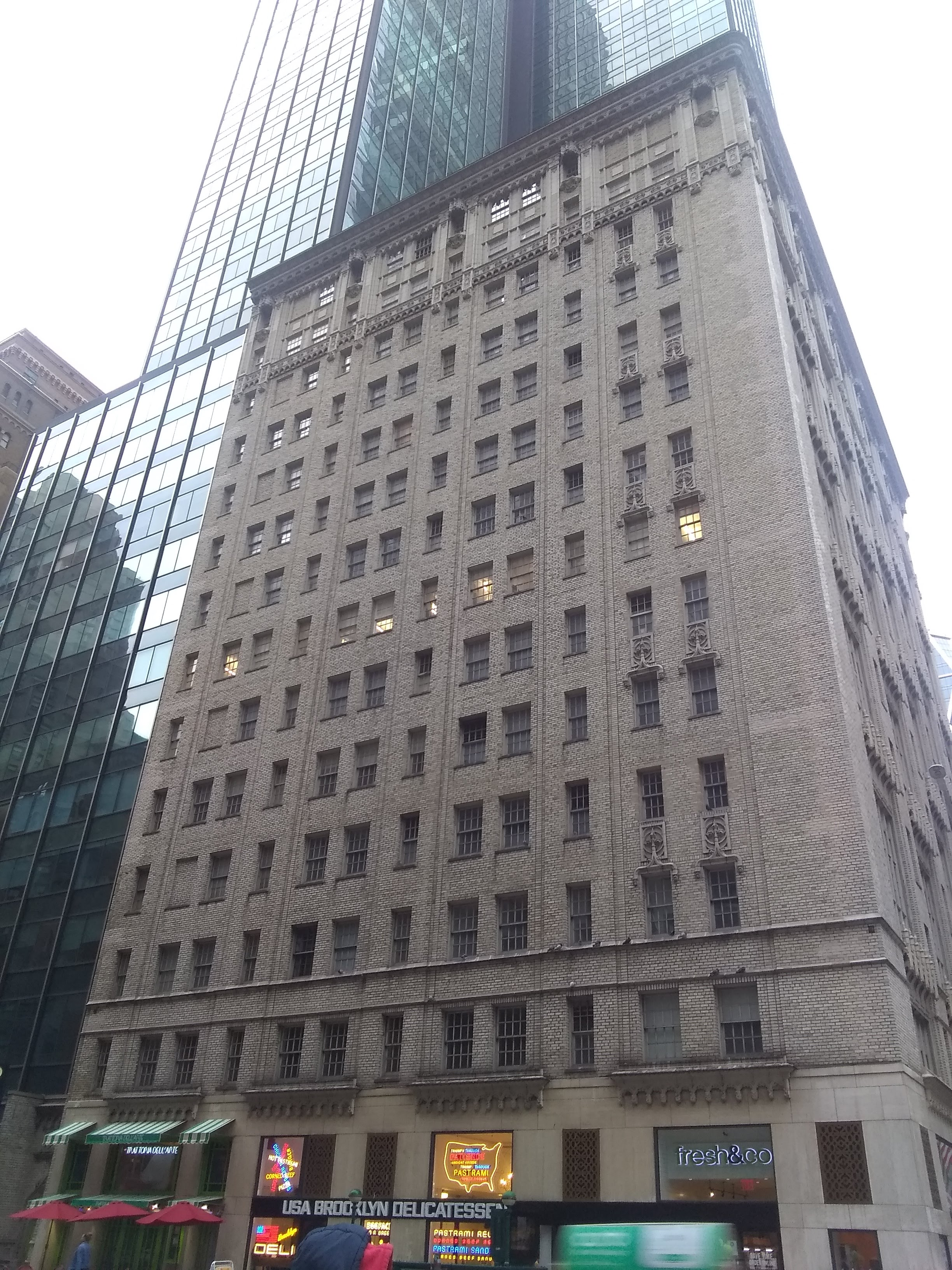
Seventh Avenue facade

On the third through twelfth stories facing 57th Street, there are double-height window openings, designed to maximize sun exposure for artists. These double-height openings are separated by Gothic style iron canopies. Each of the wide bays contains five sash windows per floor, while the narrow bays have a single sash window on each floor. The center bay's double-height window openings are offset by one story, with single-height windows on the third and twelfth stories. The windows on Seventh Avenue are smaller sash windows, arranged into rows more typical of those in other apartment buildings. Each of the wide bays contains two separate sash windows per floor, while each narrow bay contains one sash window per floor, with some exceptions.

The top two stories form the "cap" of the building, marked by a frieze and corbel course below the twelfth story. The 57th Street side has double-height openings while the Seventh Avenue side has sash windows. On the fourteenth story, there are decorative niches in each narrow bay, containing depictions of marmosets making different facial expressions. The cornice above the fourteenth story consists of a decorative corbel table.

=== Features ===
According to the building's owner, The Feil Organization, the Rodin Studios has 135,051 square feet (12,546.6 m^{2}) of floor area, or an average of 11,497 square feet (1,068.1 m^{2}) of rentable area per floor. The building also has three elevators. Gilbert planned the building with retail on the first floor, and offices on the second floor and part of the third floor. The ground floor has a barrel-vaulted lobby, the only extant portion of Gilbert's interior design.

The remainder of the building was dedicated to artists' studios in single-story simplex and double-story duplex layouts, customized for each different resident's needs. The simplex studios were in the rear wings, on the southern side of the building. The duplex studios all faced north toward the double-height windows on 57th Street. The smaller duplexes were in the center three bays, and the central bay was staggered so that each pair of studios in the three inner bays overlapped. The duplexes in the outer bays, by contrast, were generally larger. The duplexes had 22-foot (6.7 m) double-height ceilings, higher than the 16-foot (4.9 m) ceilings in traditional studios of the time, and were 30 feet (9.1 m) deep. Each unit had between three and eight rooms, with the living space on the lower floor and the bedrooms on the upper floor. The double-height studios were subsequently infilled with intermediate floor slabs, subdividing the interior into single-height office floors.

== History ==
Cooperative apartment housing in New York City became popular in the late 19th century because of overcrowded housing conditions in the city's dense urban areas. By the beginning of the 20th century, there were some housing cooperatives in the city that catered specifically to artists, including at 130 and 140 West 57th Street, as well as on 67th Street near Central Park. However, these were almost always fully occupied.

The Rodin Studios corporation was founded in 1916 by painters Lawton S. Parker, Georgia Timken Fry, and John Hemming Fry. The Frys were married and studied at the St. Louis School of Fine Arts, where Parker later taught; all three had studied in Paris before moving to New York City. The Frys moved to the city in 1902 and lived in numerous studio buildings, including in the nearby Gainsborough Studios from 1911 to 1918. During that time, John Fry became vice president of the Gainsborough Studios corporation, in which he learned about the operation of artists' cooperatives. Parker and the Frys created the Rodin Studios because neither could find a satisfactory studio arrangement. The Rodin Studios corporation decided to develop its studios on the site of the Inverness, which was close to 57th Street's artistic hub and to Carnegie Hall in particular, as well as being located on a major avenue.

=== Artists' studios ===
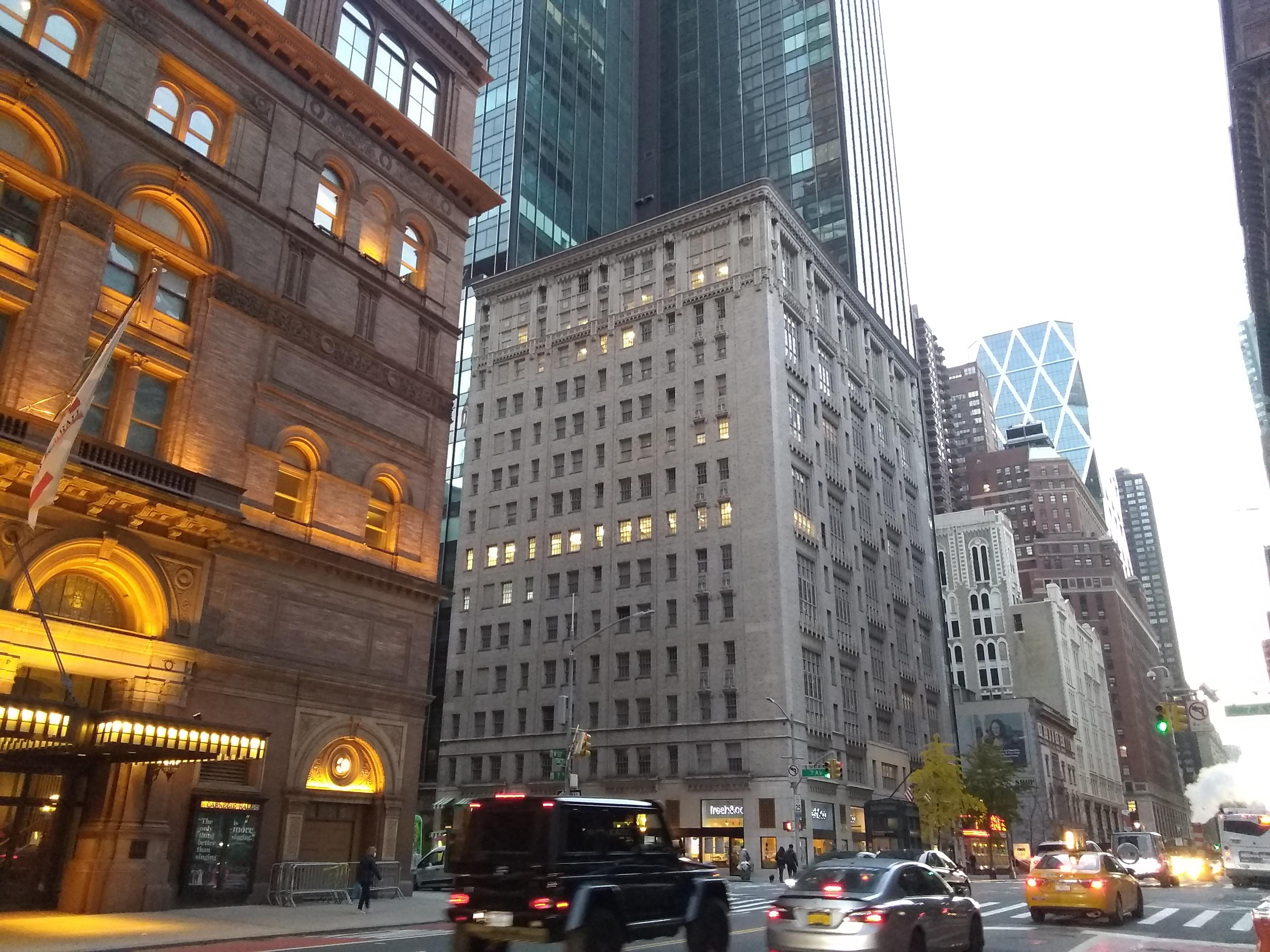
Seen from diagonally across 57th Street and Seventh Avenue. Carnegie Hall is at left and 888 Seventh Avenue is behind the Rodin Studios.

The first plans for the building were submitted by Cass Gilbert one or two days after the 1916 Zoning Resolution was passed on July 25, 1916, because of an apparent misunderstanding about when the vote would take place; these plans were initially not recorded. The Rodin Studios corporation acquired the site from Mary A. Chisholm in August 1916. The next month, the Metropolitan Life Insurance Company loaned $700,000 (equivalent to $14,891,000 in 2024 (Note: Johnston, Louis; Williamson, Samuel H. (2023). "What Was the U.S. GDP Then?". MeasuringWorth. United States Gross Domestic Product deflator figures follow the MeasuringWorth series.)) to the Rodin Studios corporation, while Georgia Fry provided a second mortgage of $200,000. Gilbert revised the design several times based on suggestions from Parker and the Frys. Gilbert submitted revised plans that November, and the New York City Board of Estimate exempted the Rodin Studios from the new zoning law. The building ultimately cost $1.4 million and was ready for occupancy by late 1917.

Upon the building's completion, the Kelly-Springfield Tire Company leased the ground floor store and the basement. New York Times advertisements from 1918 showed that the most ornate apartments went for at least $350 per month, equivalent to $7,492 in 2025. (Note: 1634–1699: McCusker, J. J. (1997). How Much Is That in Real Money? A Historical Price Index for Use as a Deflator of Money Values in the Economy of the United States: Addenda et Corrigenda (PDF). American Antiquarian Society. 1700–1799: McCusker, J. J. (1992). How Much Is That in Real Money? A Historical Price Index for Use as a Deflator of Money Values in the Economy of the United States (PDF). American Antiquarian Society. 1800–present: Federal Reserve Bank of Minneapolis. "Consumer Price Index (estimate) 1800–".) Meanwhile, the Frys took four of the five apartments on the thirteenth and fourteenth floors, creating a 30-room studio. The Rodin Studios corporation received a loan of $800,000 in May 1922, and Kelly-Springfield leased the ground-floor corner storefront and second floor. The studios were not only occupied by artists; the 1930 United States census indicated that the residents included bankers, cotton brokers, and railroad engineers. The building's notable residents included artist Boris Anisfeld; author Theodore Dreiser, who lived there from 1926 to 1931; and Ethel Traphagen Leigh, founder of the nearby Traphagen School of Fashion. Additionally, Johann Berthelsen operated a private school of voice in the Rodin Studios, while architect John Eberson opened an office in the building in 1926.

=== Later use ===
In 1942, the building was sold at auction to Joseph A. Hale for $800,500 to satisfy a lien against the Rodin Studios corporation. Two years later, in 1944, the Sipal Realty Corporation acquired the Rodin Studios.

By the 1960s, the building was being used as offices. (Note: The New York Times and the New York City Landmarks Preservation Commission cite a date range of 1959 to 1968.) The interiors were heavily modified; only the original lobby was left intact. Sipal Realty, the building's owner through the late 1970s, also drastically changed the appearance of the storefronts, which were then restored by the subsequent owner. The building's office tenants included the Career Transition for Dancers. The New York City Landmarks Preservation Commission (LPC) held hearings in 1986 during which it considered the Rodin Studios for city landmark status. Two years later, on February 16, 1988, the LPC designated the Rodin Studios as a landmark. The lobby was renovated around 1998.

Until the 2000s, the Rodin Studios was owned by South African investor Eddie Trump. RCG Longview, a joint venture of Feil and Rockpoint Group, bought the building in February 2007 for $125.7 million. (Note: The deed transfer took place on February 7, 2007, but the document date was labeled as 2004. The 2004 date has been copied by several sources.) Subsequently, architects Zaskorski & Notaro and engineers Robert Silman Associates were hired to restore the facade, replacing one-tenth of the terracotta. By the 2010s, the building's tenants included medical and dental offices, law companies, film and television producers, and talent agencies. In 2014, Feil and Rockpoint paid $120.4 million for a majority stake in the building's ownership.

== Reception ==
Christopher Gray of The New York Times wrote that the Rodin Studios was "one of the most elegant studio and apartment buildings in New York" and that the 57th Street facade was "a shimmering cascade of French Gothic ornament". Architecture and Building magazine stated that the facade, "though very simple, has a decidedly decorative effect." The magazine The Art World called the Rodin Studios "strong yet graceful, solidly planted on the ground, yet lifting the mind of the observer upwards willy-nilly."

== See also ==
- List of New York City Designated Landmarks in Manhattan from 14th to 59th Streets
