= Masquerade (musical) =

Immersive Off-Broadway musical production

- Music: Andrew Lloyd Webber
- Lyrics: Charles Hart; additional lyrics by Richard Stilgoe
- Book: Richard Stilgoe; Andrew Lloyd Webber
- Basis: The Phantom of the Opera
- Premiere: September 28, 2025: 218 West 57th Street
- Productions: 2025 Off-Broadway

Masquerade is an immersive production of Andrew Lloyd Webber's 1986 musical The Phantom of the Opera. Directed by Diane Paulus and produced by Randy Weiner, Masquerade opened on September 28, 2025. The production takes place at 218 West 57th Street at the former site of Lee's Art Shop.

== Format ==
Masquerade hosts six performances (called "Pulses") per night, welcoming a total of 360 visitors per show. The show is run in canon, with groups of 60 guests sequentially entering the performance every 15-minutes. Paulus told BroadwayWorld that this structure emerged out of two years' worth of experiments. She explained, "The art of it is that no one knows that six shows are going on [at the same time]. So when you're there, you think this whole thing is for you! You have no idea that on your tail is another group coming." Performances run nightly Tuesday to Sunday in addition to weekend matinees.

Scenes unfold in close proximity as guests move through rooms representing locations within the Paris Opera House ("L'Opéra Populaire") and the Phantom's world. The production retains the central characters, music, and romantic-gothic world of The Phantom of the Opera, but restructures the experience as a guided, up-close performance.

Guests are required to dress in black, white, or silver cocktail attire, and masquerade masks must be worn for the duration of the performance. The experience is constructed to visually and physically bring the audience into the Phantom's world, immersing guests as attendees of the opera ghost's exclusive masquerade.

As described on Andrew Lloyd Webber's website, "Masquerade will take audiences inside, behind-the-scenes, and closer than ever before to the strange affair of The Phantom of the Opera – a mystery never fully explained. From the highest rooftop balconies to the subterranean lair deep below the Opera Populaire at 218 West 57th St, guests will be invited to experience the music of the night and 'a little illumination', more intimately than ever before as they are invited to "dress extravagantly' and 'hide your face' as they move through the building."

== Conception and development ==
Masquerade was conceived by director Diane Paulus and producer Randy Weiner. The show was developed in collaboration with Lloyd Webber Entertainment (LWE) and Andrew Lloyd Webber, who composed several new orchestrations and interludes exclusively for Masquerade.

Plans for an immersive New York version of The Phantom of the Opera were teased before the project was formally announced. Cryptic social media posts, scavenger-hunt-style clues, and in-world marketing portrayed the opera ghost "haunting" New York City". Most notably, Masquerade sent the Phantom to crash the 2025 Tony Awards red carpet.

In June 2025, Playbill announced official plans and team members for the production, with Diane Paulus, known for Broadway productions including Pippin and Waitress, attached as director and Randy Weiner, known for immersive and nightlife-based theatrical productions including Sleep No More and The Box Manhattan, as producer. The production began preview performances on July 31, 2025, and officially opened on September 28, 2025.

== Original cast ==
Off-Broadway (2025)
Phantom	Jeff Kready
	Telly Leung
	Hugh Panaro
	Kyle Scatliffe
	Clay Singer
	Nik Walker
Christine	Haile Ferrier
	Eryn LeCroy
	Francesca Mehrotra
	Riley Noland
	Kaley Ann Voorhees
	Anna Zavelson
Raoul	Nicholas Edwards
	Francisco Javier González
	Paul Adam Schaefer
Madame Giry	Satomi Hofmann
	Maree Johnson
	Tia Karaplis
	Betsy Morgan
Andre	Raymond J. Lee
Firmin	Jeremy Stolle
Carlotta	Satomi Hofmann
	Betsy Morgan
Piangi	Phumzile Sojola
Boy in the Cage	Mayfield Haynes
	Kody Jauron
	Kevin Zambrano
Buquet	Jacob Lacopo
	Andrew Wojtal
Barker	Chris Ryan
Master of Pyromancy	Joseph Kerr
Violinist	Bryan Hernandez-Luch

== Reception ==
Masquerade attracted significant audience interest following the start of performances in July 2025, developing a following that included frequent repeat attendance. In January 2026, The New York Times profiled the production and its fan community, reporting that some audience members had already attended more than a dozen times. The paper noted that tickets for the initial six weeks of performances sold out within three hours and described how repeat viewing had become part of the production's appeal, as audiences encountered different performers, details and interactions on subsequent visits. By that point, approximately 360 audience members were attending each night across six staggered performances, with the production continuing to release additional blocks of tickets.

Critical response was generally positive, particularly toward the production's immersive staging, design and close proximity between performers and audiences. New York Theatre Guide critic Gillian Russo awarded the production four-and-a-half stars and wrote that it expanded the spectacle of the original The Phantom of the Opera "tenfold," calling the effect "entirely thrilling." Frank Scheck of New York Stage Review similarly identified the intimacy of the staging as the production's principal strength, emphasizing the effect of experiencing Andrew Lloyd Webber's score and the performers at unusually close range.

Johnny Oleksinski of the New York Post gave the production a strongly positive review, describing it as a "hot-ticket" reinvention of Phantom and writing that director Diane Paulus's additions elevated the production beyond a conventional tourist attraction. He praised Paulus's ability to combine commercial spectacle with more emotionally resonant theatrical material and concluded that the production restored a sense of grandeur to Phantom in New York.

Other critics offered more qualified assessments while acknowledging the production's effectiveness with audiences. Alexis Soloski of The New York Times described portions of the experience as "breathlessly exciting" observing that audience members around her were openly crying during the conclusion. Adam Feldman of Time Out New York awarded the production four out of five stars, described it as "a blast" and praised the opportunity to experience familiar material from new physical and dramatic perspectives.

The production also received recognition during the 2025–26 New York theatre awards season. Diane Paulus and the creative collaborators behind Masquerade received a 2026 Drama Desk Special Award recognizing the production's collaborative approach to reimagining The Phantom of the Opera. The Drama Desk described the production as having brought "expansive ingenuity" to the source material and cited the work of Paulus and the production's directors, designers, stage managers and other collaborators.

Masquerade was also nominated for the Drama League Award for Outstanding Revival of a Musical. It received six Outer Critics Circle Award nominations, including Outstanding Revival of a Musical, Outstanding Direction of a Musical for Paulus, Outstanding Choreography for Sidi Larbi Cherkaoui, and nominations recognizing its scenic, costume and sound design. In May 2026, it won the Off Broadway Alliance Award for Best Unique Theatrical Experience.

== Nightlife ==
The performance of Masquerade concludes by delivering guests to The Lake Bar, a 4000-square-foot bar and nightlife venue housed within the building. On weekends, The Lake Bar hosts co-produced nightlife events under the Masquerade sub-brand Masquerade Nocturne. Masquerade also hosts extravagant seasonal soirées, including "Le Bal Macabre" at Halloween and "Le Bal Lumière" at New Year's Eve.
