= 218 West 57th Street =

Commercial building in Manhattan, New York

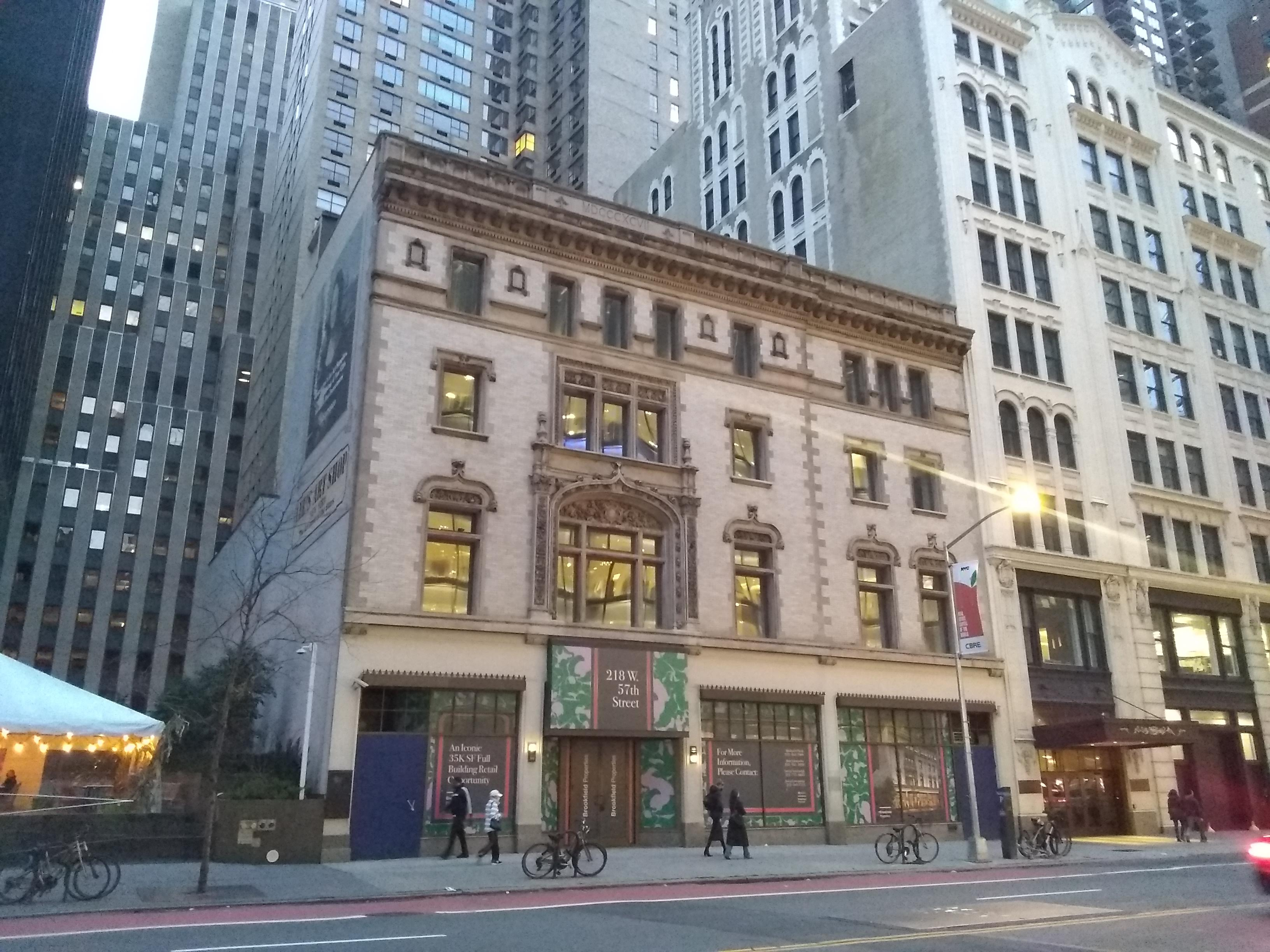
- Interactive map of the 218 West 57th Street area
- Alternative names: ASCE Society House

General information
- Type: Commercial
- Architectural style: French Renaissance Revival
- Location: 218–222 West 57th Street, Manhattan, New York, United States
- Coordinates: 40°45′57″N 73°58′52″W
- Groundbreaking: July 1896 (original); June 1905 (annex)
- Opened: November 24, 1897 (original); January 1906 (annex)
- Renovated: 1918, 1939, 2000–2002
- Owner: Thor Equities and General Growth Properties

Technical details
- Structural system: Steel girders and timber
- Floor count: 4
- Floor area: 21,837 square feet (2,028.7 m^{2})

Design and construction
- Architects: Cyrus L. W. Eidlitz (original); Cyrus L. W. Eidlitz and Andrew C. McKenzie (annex)
- Developer: American Society of Civil Engineers
- Main contractor: Charles T. Wills, William L. Crow

New York City Landmark
- Designated: December 16, 2008
- Reference no.: 2297

218 West 57th Street (also known as 220 West 57th Street; formerly known as the Society House of the American Society of Civil Engineers or the ASCE Society House) is a building on 57th Street in Midtown Manhattan in New York City. It was designed by Cyrus L. W. Eidlitz in the French Renaissance Revival style, with an annex built to designs by Eidlitz and Andrew C. McKenzie. The building served as the headquarters of the American Society of Civil Engineers (ASCE) from 1897 to 1917.

218 West 57th Street is four stories tall, with a basement, though the top two stories only cover a portion of the site. The facade is made largely of white glazed brick with ornamentation made of elaborately carved Indiana Limestone. The second story contains an elliptical ogee arch with a tripartite window, while the top of the building has a cornice with modillions. The interior originally contained a lounge, reading room, auditorium, offices, and stacks for the ASCE's library. When the ASCE moved out, the interior was converted to commercial space, and escalators and elevators were installed.

The building was proposed in early 1895 to replace the ASCE's previous overcrowded headquarters, and Eidlitz was selected as the architect as a result of an architectural design competition. The building opened on November 24, 1897, and an annex was built between 1905 and 1906 to accommodate the ASCE's increased attendance. After moving out, the ASCE continued to own 218 West 57th Street until 1966, leasing the space to automotive showrooms and various office tenants. The building also housed a Schrafft's restaurant between 1928 and the 1970s, and Lee's Art Shop between 1975 and 2016. The New York City Landmarks Preservation Commission designated the building as a city landmark in 2008. From 2025 onward, the building has hosted the Masquerade show.

== Site ==
218 West 57th Street is on the southern side of 57th Street, between Broadway and Seventh Avenue two blocks south of Central Park, in the Midtown Manhattan neighborhood of New York City. The site covers approximately 8,400 square feet (780 m^{2}). It is 75 feet (23 m) wide, with a depth ranging from 107 feet (33 m) on the eastern side to 118 feet (36 m) on the western side. The building carries the alternate addresses 218–222 West 57th Street. (Note: An adjacent former 3-story building to the east, belonging to Consolidated Edison, also carried the address 212–218 West 57th Street.)

218 West 57th Street abuts 224 West 57th Street to the west, and a public plaza and 888 Seventh Avenue to the east. Other nearby buildings include the Central Park Tower to the northwest, the American Fine Arts Society (also known as the Art Students League of New York building) to the north, the Osborne Apartments to the northeast, the Rodin Studios to the east, and 1740 Broadway to the south.

218 West 57th Street is part of a former artistic hub around a two-block section of West 57th Street between Sixth Avenue and Broadway. The hub had been developed during the late 19th and early 20th centuries, following the opening of Carnegie Hall at Seventh Avenue in 1891. The area contained several headquarters of organizations such as the American Fine Arts Society, the Lotos Club, and the ASCE Society House. By the 21st century, the artistic hub had largely been replaced with Billionaires' Row, a series of luxury skyscrapers around the southern end of Central Park. Furthermore, in the 20th century, the area was part of Manhattan's "Automobile Row", a stretch of Broadway extending mainly between Times Square at 42nd Street and Sherman Square at 72nd Street. In the late 1900s and early 1910s, several large automobile showrooms, stores, and garages were built nearby, including the U.S. Rubber Company Building at 1790 Broadway, the B.F. Goodrich showroom at 1780 Broadway, and the A. T. Demarest and Peerless Motor Company showrooms at 224 West 57th Street.

== Architecture ==
The original building, constructed from 1896 to 1897, was designed by Cyrus L. W. Eidlitz in the French Renaissance Revival style, as the headquarters of the American Society of Civil Engineers (ASCE). The annex, built from 1905 to 1906, was designed by Eidlitz and Andrew C. McKenzie. The original structure was constructed by Charles T. Wills, and the annex was built by William L. Crow. The design was meant to complement the American Fine Arts Society and Carnegie Hall.

The front of the building is at the north, near the main entrance on 57th Street, while the rear of the building is at the south. The building contains four stories and a basement, although the third and fourth stories are smaller and only occupy the front portion of the lot.

=== Facade ===
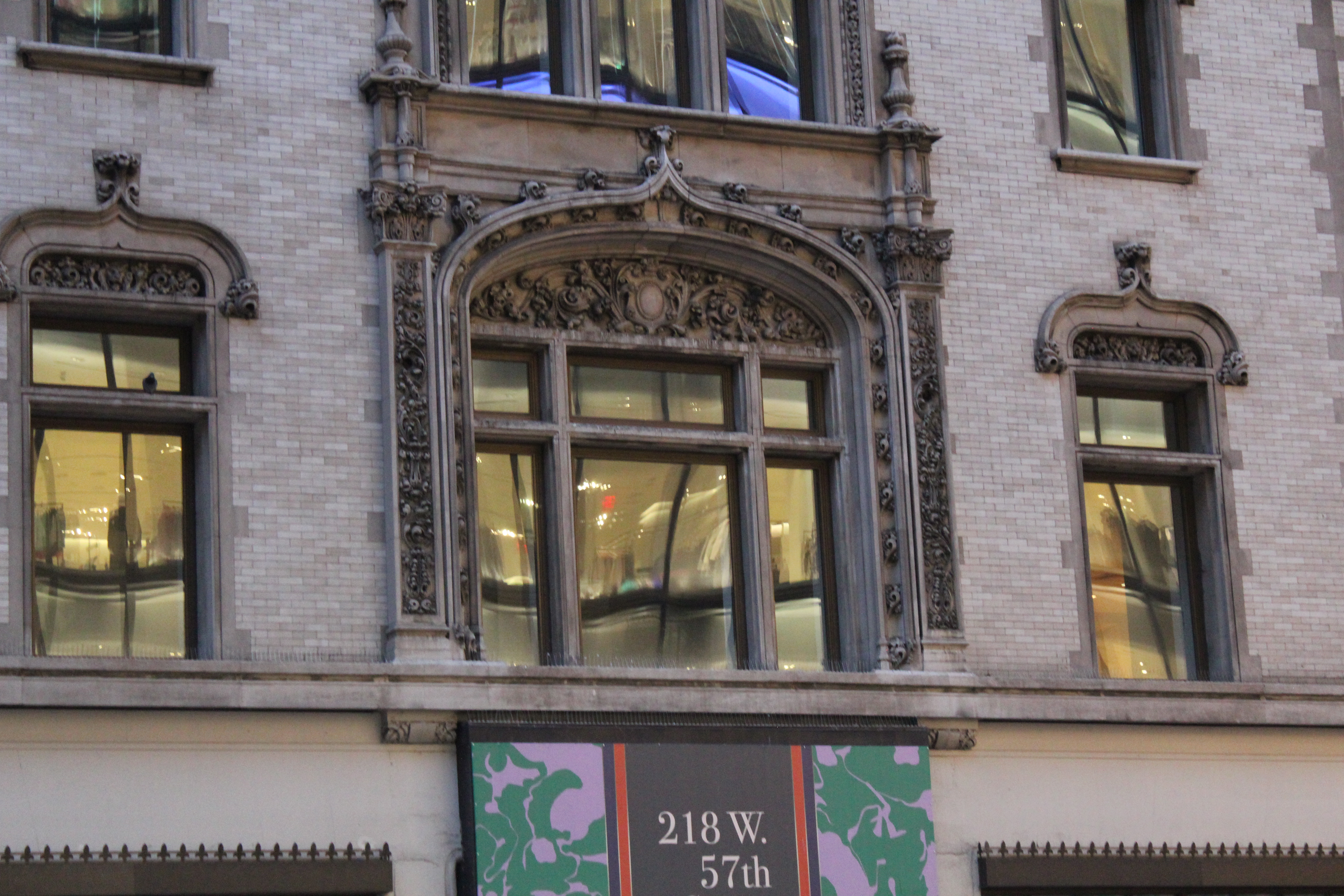
Tripartite window detail

The main elevation, or side, of the building faces north toward 57th Street. The facade of the ground story is made of Indiana Limestone, while that of the upper floors is made mostly of white brick, with some limestone decoration. As viewed from 57th Street, the three vertical bays on the left, or eastern side, are part of the original building. The two bays on the right, or western, side are part of the annex. The central bay of the original building, the second-easternmost in the current design, is wider than the other bays. The facades of the original building and annex have vertical quoins at their edges.

In the original design, the central entrance on the first floor contained a stoop, with two-part windows on either side. The annex also originally had a pair of windows at ground level. The first floor was clad in stone during a 1918 renovation, and the original windows were placed with large display windows. On the second floor, in the central bay of the original building, is a canopied ogee arch with a tripartite window and ornamental reliefs in the tympanum. The other second-story windows have rectangular windows, which are topped by lintels shaped like ogee arches. On the third story, the original central bay contains a tripartite window, while the other windows have rectangular windows with small sills and decorative lintels. In the original design, a molded band course made of stone stretched horizontally between the third and fourth stories. The rectangular fourth-story windows were enlarged in 1939 so that they extended downward into the band course. There is a modillioned stone cornice above the fourth floor.

The eastern wall, made of brick, is visible from the plaza to the east. A sign advertising Lee's Art Shop, a former tenant, is painted on the eastern wall.

=== Interior ===
The building has 21,837 square feet (2,028.7 m^{2}) of space. It was built with a superstructure made of steel girders and timber. When used by the ASCE, the basement had a heating and electrical plant that projected 30 feet (9.1 m) underneath the sidewalk, as well as storage and publication rooms and a janitors' apartment. The first floor had a reception room and coat room to the left of the main entrance; a secretary's office to the right; and a lounge in the rear, occupying the entire width of the building and accessed by the main hallway. A main staircase led to the second floor, which had a reading room at the front and an auditorium in the rear. (Note: The auditorium could fit 400 seats, but it was technically a multi-purpose space, so portable chairs had to be used. Its capacity was expanded to 600 seats with the construction of the annex in 1905–1906.) There were executive and editorial offices on the third floor. The stacks for the ASCE's library, on the fourth floor, could hold more than 100,000 volumes. Because the upper two floors were not likely to be heavily used, the original design did not include an elevator, but there was a book lift between the second and fourth floors. Electricity was provided by two 25-horsepower (19 kW) gas engines. The lounge's and auditorium's areas were expanded by 50% in the 1905–1906 construction of the annex. In addition, a staircase was built between the lounge and auditorium.

After the ASCE moved out, the building was used mostly as commercial and office space. A brass and iron staircase was added for the Schrafft's restaurant in the building in 1928, and the former auditorium was converted into storage space. In addition, a marble-clad elevator was added to the second floor. The Schrafft's restaurant took up the first and second floors and could fit 500 guests. When Lee's Art Shop renovated the building in 2002, escalators were added between the first, second, and third floors, and an elevator and staircase were built from the first to the fourth floors. Many of the original interior designs had been preserved or recreated by Lee's Art Shop.

== History ==
The ASCE was founded in 1852 and held its first meetings at the Croton Aqueduct Department building in City Hall Park, Manhattan. The meetings occurred regularly through 1855 when the society suspended its activities until 1867. The reconvened ASCE met at the Chamber of Commerce of the State of New York until 1875 when the society moved to 4 East 23rd Street. The ASCE moved again in 1877 to 104 East 20th Street and in 1881 to 127 East 23rd Street. By the 1890s, the ASCE's headquarters on 127 East 23rd Street were becoming overcrowded. A historian for the society wrote that many regular meetings were standing-room only, while its annual conventions had to be held in a church because the headquarters were insufficient.

=== Planning and construction ===
In May 1895, the ASCE sent a circular to all members concerning the need for a new Society House. At the society's annual convention the following month, the ASCE's members responded overwhelmingly in favor of a new Society House, and the matter was forwarded to ASCE's Board of Direction. By October 1895, the board had selected a site at 218–220 West 57th Street. The site was near the established arts hub on 57th Street and was well-served by public transit, and the eastern border of the site faced what was then the Central Presbyterian Church.

The ASCE acquired the site in January 1896 for $80,000. Immediately afterward, the society convened a committee to oversee the design, contract procurement, and construction of its new Society House. The committee was led by George A. Just and contained seven other members, including William Rich Hutton. The original plans, to cost $90,000, were prepared by ASCE vice president Joseph M. Wilson and called for reception and meeting rooms on the first floor, offices on the second, and the ASCE's library on the third floor. The total cost of the project was $45,000 greater than the cost advertised on the circular, so the ASCE started soliciting for subscriptions to fund the building. By March, the ASCE board instead decided to host an architectural design competition in which ASCE members and a few "specially invited" architects could participate. Twelve plans were submitted, and the committee picked Eidlitz's design in May 1896. (Note: The plans came from eight ASCE members and four invited architects. The ASCE's documents do not indicate the names of the other participants, but the New York City Landmarks Preservation Commission states that one plan was submitted by William B. Bigelow and Frank E. Wallis.)

Excavation at the Society House's site started on July 9, 1896, and cost $4,500. At the time, The New York Times reported that the building would be made of brick and granite, with terracotta detail. Due to uncertainties over funding, the ASCE building committee delayed the awarding of construction contracts until a new president was elected in late 1896. By November, the Mutual Life Insurance Company of New York agreed to fund the project, giving the society a $135,000 mortgage. The next month, the ASCE's new president Thomas Curtis Clarke announced that a construction contract had been awarded to Charles T. Wills for $86,775. The Society House was supposed to have been completed by September 1897, but construction was further held up by strikes among the plasterers and steamfitters working on the project.

=== ASCE headquarters ===
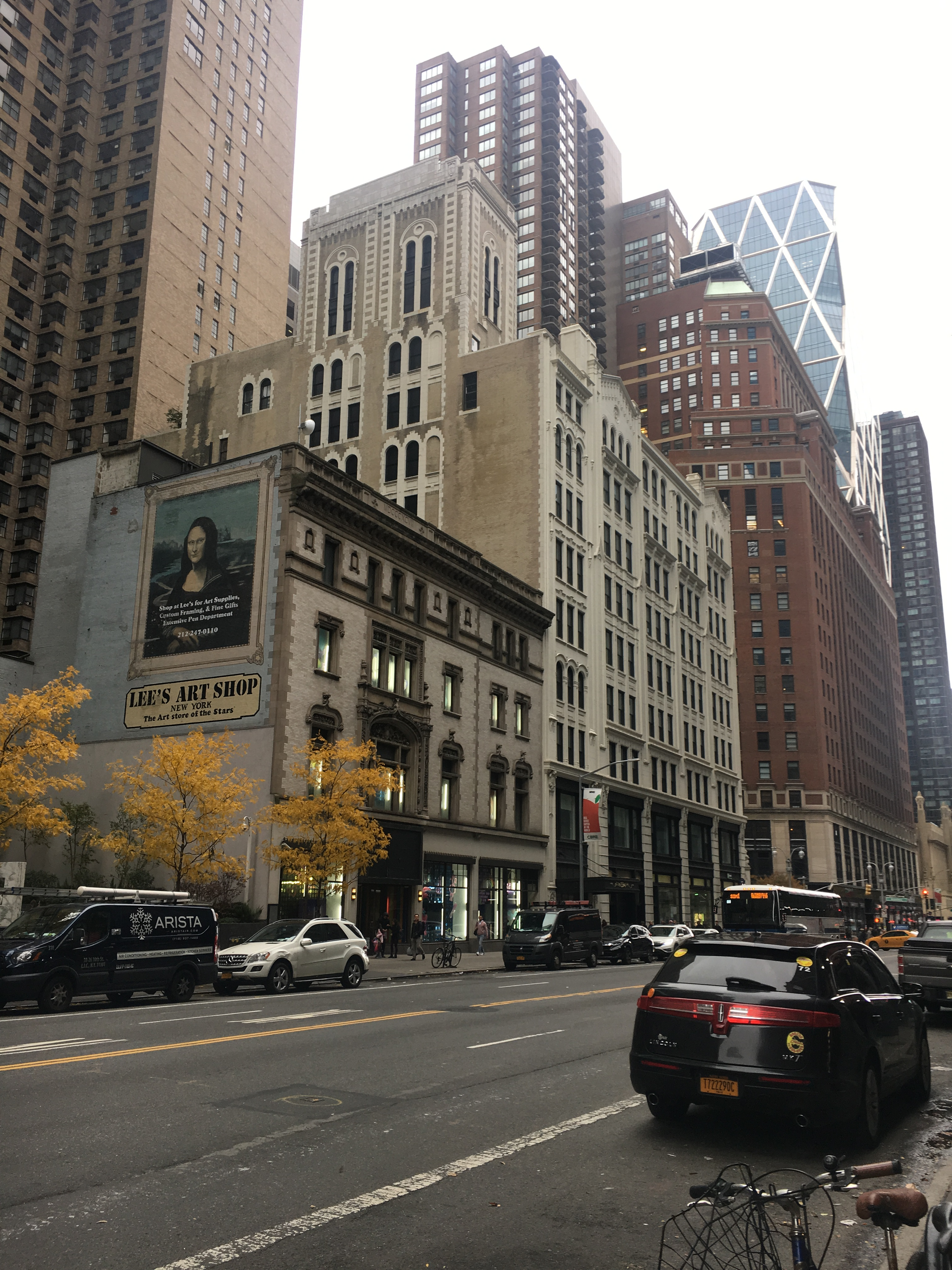
Seen from east, with 224 West 57th Street behind the former ASCE Society House

The ASCE Society House officially opened on November 24, 1897, and ultimately cost $206,284 (equivalent to $6,671,267 in 2024 (Note: Johnston, Louis; Williamson, Samuel H. (2023). "What Was the U.S. GDP Then?". MeasuringWorth. United States Gross Domestic Product deflator figures follow the MeasuringWorth series.)). At the building's opening, Benjamin M. Harrod, ASCE's president, stated that the building had been designed as a headquarters of a professional association rather than as a clubhouse. The ASCE stated in a pamphlet that the Society House was the first building in the United States to be built "solely for the use of a professional engineering society". The committee in charge of overseeing the society house's construction was disbanded in late 1898, their work having been completed.

In 1903, Andrew Carnegie offered to donate $1 million for the construction of the new Engineering Societies' Building on 39th Street. The ASCE and several other engineering societies were invited to participate in construction. However, the ASCE's members voted against joining the Engineering Societies' Building in March 1904. Instead, the board decided to purchase an additional lot to the west of the existing ASCE Society House, measuring about 25 by 115 feet (7.6 by 35.1 m). Plans for the annex were filed in May, and the next month, the ASCE purchased the additional lot from the Island Realty Company for over $100,000. That December, the ASCE created a committee to oversee the construction of an annex. A contract was awarded to William L. Crow in May 1905. The work cost approximately $61,000 and was substantially completed at the time of the ASCE's annual meeting in January 1906. (Note: The Landmarks Preservation Commission cites the cost as being $61,430, while ASCE records cite the cost as being $61,338.30.)

After the owners of the Engineering Societies' Building paid off the debt on that structure in 1914, they again invited the ASCE to move there. If the ASCE agreed, it would be designated a "founding society" of the Engineering Societies' Building. The ASCE acquiesced and moved its headquarters to the Engineering Societies' Building by December 1917, after two additional stories were erected for the society there. The ASCE continued to own 218 West 57th Street, leasing the building at great profit.

=== Automobile Row ===
After the ASCE's relocation, the Federal Food Board immediately leased the space, moving to 218 West 57th Street in December 1917. Another tenant, the National Agricultural Prize Commission, had offices in the building between 1917 and 1918.

The Ajax Rubber Company, at the time one of the largest pneumatic tire makers in the United States, leased 218 West 57th Street in July 1918. Subsequently, Arnold W. Brunner modified the ground floor into Ajax's tire showrooms, and the renovation was completed by January 1919. The building thus came to be one of several automotive and tire showrooms on Automobile Row. Elias A. Cohen leased the underlying from the ASCE in 1926, intending to replace the old Society House with a skyscraper, though the plans did not come to fruition. A Stearns-Knight and Willys-Knight vehicle showroom was opened on the ground floor in July 1927. Willys, manufacturer of Stearns-Knight and Willys-Knight vehicles, subleased the salesroom from Ajax the next month. The Stearns-Knight salesroom only operated for one year. Ajax subsidiary Racine Rubber Company, as well as the Stearns-Knight Sales Corporation, remained in the building through at least 1935.

=== Schrafft's and offices ===
The F. G. Shattuck and Company leased the entire building in March 1928. Twelve months later, the company opened its 500-seat Schrafft's restaurant on the first and second floors of the building. The restaurant was near both Carnegie Hall and Manhattan's Theater District, operating more than sixteen hours a day. It included a second-story grill catering exclusively to men, as well as spaces that could be rented for events. The New York State Federation of Women's Clubs moved its headquarters to the building's fourth floor in May 1932. After Prohibition in the United States was repealed in 1933, Shattuck requested a liquor license for the 57th Street restaurant the next year. The bar, known as the Columbus Room, opened in 1936.

The third and fourth stories were converted to apartments by 1939, and Bloch & Hesse renovated the restaurant's interior the next year. The Federation of Women's Clubs headquarters, as well as the Schrafft's restaurant, hosted a variety of dinners and fundraising events during the 1930s through the 1950s. The building was also leased to other tenants, such as a travel agency that occupied the building from 1940 to 1970, as well as winemakers Fromm & Sichel from 1946 to 1956.

The ASCE finally sold its old Society House in May 1966 for $850,000, to a syndicate headed by George M. Horn. Two years later, the Arlen Realty and Development Corporation acquired 218 West 57th Street from Horn for about $1 million, and also purchased several adjacent plots to the east. The adjacent plots were used for the development of a 628-foot (191 m) skyscraper on 888 Seventh Avenue, which was completed in 1971. Arlen preserved 218 West 57th Street, and built a privately owned public plaza separating the old Society House from the new skyscraper, to receive a zoning credit that allowed the skyscraper's maximum height to be increased. Meanwhile, Schrafft's was experiencing a financial downturn by 1972, when it sold off several buildings and moved its accounting offices to 218 West 57th Street. Xenia Clubs International subleased 13,000 square feet (1,200 m^{2}) in the building the next year for its executive offices.

=== Lee's Art Shop ===
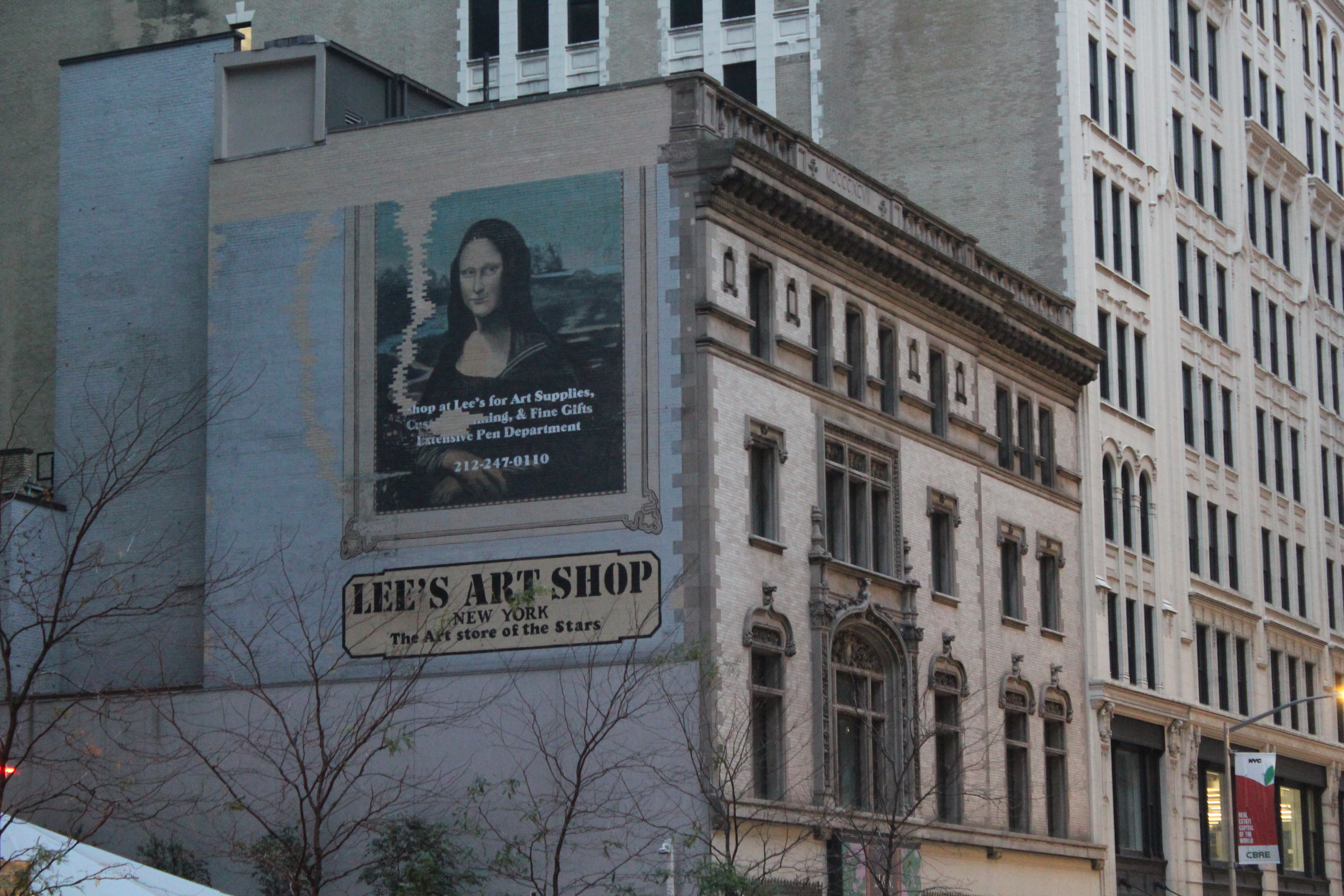
Lee's Art Shop advertisement on the eastern facade

Lee's Art Shop rented space at 218 West 57th Street in 1975. The family-owned store, founded by Gilbert and Ruth Steinberg in 1951, had previously been located across the street in the Osborne. The move had been necessitated because Lee's needed ten times the space of its previous location, which required an open-plan layout for the store. The relocation included the renovation of the barrel-vaulted space and the installation of full-height display windows. (Note: Architecture historian Robert A. M. Stern, in his book New York 1960, incorrectly attributes this as the American Fine Arts Society building, which is on the northern side of 57th Street. Stern also erroneously labels the American Fine Arts Society as being at 212 West 57th Street, which would place it on the southern side of 57th Street, the same side as the former ASCE Society House. An image of the former ASCE Society House (labeled as the American Fine Arts Society) is shown on Stern, Mellins & Fishman 1995, p. 1135.) Lee's initially occupied only the first floor, while the upper floors remained in use as offices. The upper floors were leased to tenants such as the state's Department of Mental Hygiene and the Restaurant League of New York, as well as public-relations firms, construction contractors, and companies selling typewriter and geriatric equipment. The Steinbergs bought 218 West 57th Street from Arlen Realty in 1994 or 1995.

By 2000, Lee's Art Shop was restoring the building's original features. IBEX Construction conducted the renovation, which cost $8 million. After the project was completed in 2002, the store's area was expanded from 7,500 to 40,000 square feet (700 to 3,720 m^{2}), and it occupied all four floors of 218 West 57th Street. The Steinbergs' furniture and lighting business, in a nearby building, also moved to 218 West 57th Street's upper floors. Following Gilbert and Ruth Steinberg's deaths in 2008, ownership of the building passed to their children David Steinberg and Jill Isaacs, who continued to operate Lee's Art Shop. The New York City Landmarks Preservation Commission designated 218 West 57th Street as an official city landmark on December 18, 2008.

Besen & Associates, brokers, had first inquired about the Steinbergs' willingness to sell the store in 2005, to which the family declined. However, the Steinberg children were more willing to sell the store after they took over operations of the shop. In May 2013, Joseph Safdieh signed a contract to buy 218 West 57th Street from Steinberg and Isaacs for $65 million. Two months later, Safdieh sued Steinberg and Isaacs for $10 million over a breach of a sale agreement, and alleged that the store was illegally using the upper stories because they were zoned for office use. The lawsuit was subsequently dismissed, and in 2014, Thor Equities and General Growth Properties (GGP) went into contract to the building for $85 million. This prompted Safdieh to sue Thor and GGP for allegedly conspiring against him in the sale, though the claims against Thor were subsequently dropped. Steinberg and Isaacs, in their contract with Thor and GGP, had requested two and a half years to wind down their operations, and Lee's Art Shop ultimately closed in mid-2016.

=== Thor and GGP ownership ===
Thor and GGP finalized the building's purchase, along with 126,000 square feet (11,700 m^{2}) of air rights around and above the property, in June 2016. Thor and GGP planned to renovate the interior into luxury retail space for $20 million. To maximize retail income at 218 West 57th Street, the new owners opted to wait until after 2019, when the Nordstrom store in the neighboring Central Park Tower was set to open. During late 2017 and early 2018, the vacant building was used for an interactive exhibit themed to the TV series Downton Abbey. The next year, 218 West 57th Street was rethemed to the film Trolls and the accompanying web television series Trolls: The Beat Goes On!, for one year.

In April 2025, it was announced that an immersive show named Masquerade, based on the Broadway musical The Phantom of the Opera, would open in the Lee's Art Shop space. Masquerade was originally supposed to open at 218 West 57th Street on July 31 and run for six weeks, but its run was later extended several times to March 2026.

== Critical reception ==
The Real Estate Record and Guide, in an 1897 piece criticizing various works of architecture on West 57th Street, lauded the building for complementing the American Fine Arts Society. The Iron Age and the Times both praised the building's "richly carved" Indiana limestone facade. The Iron Age described the building as a "notable addition to the ever increasing list of New York's handsome buildings". Architectural critic Christopher Gray wrote in 2001 that "the light, sophisticated front of the building fit right in with the artistic ambience of West 57th" when it was completed.

== See also ==
- List of New York City Designated Landmarks in Manhattan from 14th to 59th Streets
