= Lunatarium =

Former NYC-based art and music space

Coordinates: 40.704671°N 73.986956°W

The Lunatarium was an art and music space located in a warehouse loft in DUMBO, a neighborhood in Brooklyn, New York City. Managed by DUMBO-based art collective Dumboluna, the Lunatarium was in operation between 2001 and 2004. In its last year of operation it moved from the top floor to the bottom floor of 10 Jay Street. Established in July 2001, Lunatarium quickly gained notoriety due to the unique nature of the space and events that took place.

At its peak, events occurred every Friday and Saturday. Dumboluna produced its own events in the Lunatarium, but also collaborated with other promoters. However, to subsidize the high rent, equipment rental, security and other logistical fees, the collective also allowed promoters and event production companies to rent the space for one-off events.

== The Space ==
The Lunatarium was located in a commercial building which also housed rehearsal studios, design studios and Yak Pak headquarters. During the week, the landlord rented the space to an electronics refurbishing company. During weekday evenings, Dumboluna allowed fire spinners to rehearse in the space for free in exchange for performances during events.

To enter, attendees were led through a hallway that sat adjacent to a loading dock, then they were to take a freight elevator and ride it to the top floor (9 stories) of the building. The space itself measured at 18,000 sq ft (1,700 m^{2})., with 30 ft (9.1 m). high ceilings, and had a raw and industrial aesthetic. The wall facing the East River was covered with windows, which allowed for a view of the Manhattan skyline and the Brooklyn, Manhattan, Williamsburg and Queensboro Bridges.

Several months after the Lunatarium first opened its doors, a small side-room was constructed to be used as a secondary performance space. During the Lunatarium's final months on the top floor, the landlord made a unilateral decision to divide the space into smaller rooms to accommodate the electronics refurbishing company. Although the walls eliminated much of the echo that pervaded the formerly cavernous space and also allowed promoters to showcase more acts, attendees complained that the walls destroyed the original spirit and impact of the original space.

As the notoriety of the Lunatarium and of the neighborhood increased, so did the rent. At the end of 2003, Dumboluna made an agreement with another landlord in the building and moved the Lunatarium to the bottom floor where it produced one-off events for almost one year. The space included a loft, loading dock (which was used as a live performance stage), and two outdoor areas—the building parking lot and the garden space between the building and the river. Despite having an enviable outdoor space and view of Manhattan, the Lunatarium could not escape comparisons to the unique experience and expansiveness of the old space.

== Decor ==
Due to its high ceilings and noncombustible brick walls and steel rafters, the Lunatarium became known as a fitting exhibition space for projections, large sculptures and pyrotechnics.

Several art collectives made use of the space, constructing: inflatable plastic lounges (Anakin Koenig Airways); a giant see-saw and other carnival-style rides (Madagascar Institute); a bed with remote-operated flame throwing bed posts (Seal Arts); and, a life-sized version of Simon—but with flame throwers, instead of colored lights (Seal Arts).

Video projections and multimedia installations were provided by numerous video artists and VJs, including: Honeygun Labs, Larry Carlson, Mumbleboy, Mojo, The v4, Metal Tiger, Amoeba Technology, Funktaxi 1533, F144 and Squaresquare.

Much of the furniture was either found or donated, filling the space with couches, mattresses, hammocks suspended from the steal rafters, and large mounds of fabric, supported by garbage bags stuffed with paper retrieved from the recycling plant located around the corner on Plymouth Street. Occasionally, art collectives left behind specially constructed furniture and decoration pieces (one notable item included a 20 ft (6.1 m). tall volcano).

An artist, known to everyone as "Al," constructed the stage—a modular piece that could be split into two smaller stages, and the two bars—one of which was constructed out of wrought iron. Using steel pipes, he also helped build the racks of the coat check area.

== Dumboluna ==
The core members of Dumboluna include founders, Sebastian Holzmeister (President), Mark Winkel (Vice President), Carlos Granda (creative director) and Micha Waschke, in addition to Rhiannon Erbach-Gruber (Musical Director) and Jacky Tran (Promotional Director), both of whom joined shortly after the collective was established. Featuring performance art, video, installations, costume themes, pyrotechnics, local and international music acts, they combined elements of New York's club, music and art party scenes. Dumboluna also aimed to maintain a democratic appeal through making stances against enforcing dress codes (but offered incentives to dress according to selected costume themes) and keeping cover charges and drink prices lower than most other New York City clubs.

The members of Dumboluna made little money from the Lunatarium, mainly using any profits from an event to subsidize the venue or to pay off debts from a previous event. However, the members were given priority if they wished to work a paying position during an event—such as bartending, coat check or mailing list circulation.

The budgetary constraints not only posed challenges to the financial viability of the space, but also to the execution of production and promotion of events. During the early period of the Lunatarium, the deposits required to secure use of the space often left Dumboluna in a scramble to gather funds at the last minute and allowing little time (in some instances, less than 4 days) to book, organize and promote an event.

== Legal issues ==
The Lunatarium was shut down on January 11, 2002 by the New York City Social Club Task Force for fire code and other permit violations. Ironically, the charge that the Lunatarium violated New York City's controversial Cabaret Laws were dropped because the event in question was publicized as an ambient music event. Supporting evidence included video footage of attendees socializing, but not dancing, and promotional materials explicitly stating that the event would not showcase any dance music. The Lunatarium reopened on January 26, 2002, when one of Run DMC's last shows took place before the death of Jam Master Jay. Since reopening, the Lunatarium operated intermittently on a one-off basis until 2004. The members of Dumboluna have continued producing events in other locations since the Lunatarium's closure.

== Awards ==
- URB Magazine, Massv Poll Award 2002: Best Alternative/unusual venue
- NY Press, Best of Manhattan 2002: Best Warehouse Fire Waiting to Happen. Quoted from NY Press:

It Never Happened. We'd like to disclaim everything we're about to say in advance, in case any fire marshals have deigned to leaf through this issue. We mean, really, what kind of venue would bring out a propane-driven version of Simon? (You remember, that toy where you had to repeat an increasingly complex pattern by smacking buttons in the right order?) We ask you, what kind of venue would allow a man in half-unbuttoned overalls to light this "Simon" device, while a volunteer stood in a square cage of metal tubing, the corners of which were spouting 7-foot (2.1 m) flames in random succession? What kind of venue, indeed, would conscientiously let its warehouse-raw brick-oven space cool down for 20 minutes before a kickball-pregnant woman with a makeup black eye dragged The Device out again, in the middle of a faux-redneck party, her thin, sweat-drenched wifebeater nearly slipping off?

When we first went there to hear DJ Spooky spin, it wasn't like they had flame dancers on a midlevel platform, while below a portly gentleman with a very large fire extinguisher was hardly obscured by sozzled loungers twirling in dangling cloth chairs. It wasn't the sort of venue that would install large plastic tubeways to explore, its art exhibits providing the interactivity and danger of a playground, back when playgrounds weren't miniature, multicolored, Martha Stewart lawn decorations. And would said venue, also, leave you dancing home, the rising sun meeting you halfway to the F train?

We mean, come on. Would anyone do that? Nooo. Who would do any of that? It would be silly. Or maybe, just some good hot fun.

- NY Press, Best of Manhattan 2003: Best Contemplation of Jailbait
