= Lawton S. Parker =

American painter

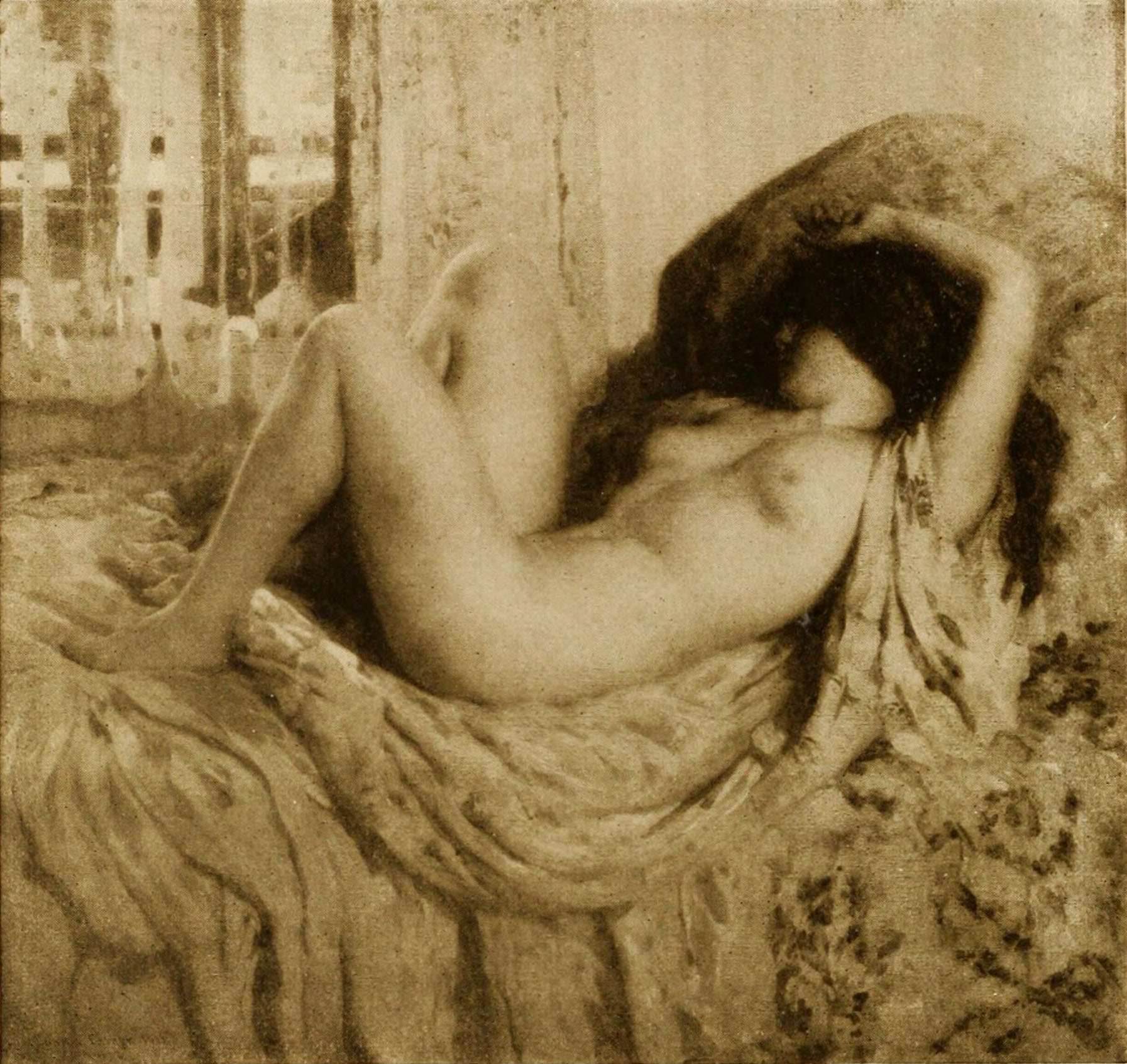
La Paresse, 1900

Lawton S. Parker (7 April 1868 – 1954) was an American impressionist painter.

== Biography ==
Born in Fairfield, Michigan, raised in Kearney, Nebraska, Parker studied at the Art Institute of Chicago beginning in 1886. He traveled to France and studied at the École des Beaux-Arts. For a time, he was associated with the Giverny art colony and adopted an impressionist style. After returning to the United States, in 1892 he was appointed professor of the St. Louis School of Fine Arts. He became director of art at Beloit College in 1893, and president of the New York School of Art in 1898-99. Beginning 1903, he resided in Chicago and taught at the Art Institute.

Among his sitters for portraits were Martin A. Ryerson, J. Ogden Armour, N. W. Harris, Harry P. Judson, and Peter S. Grosscup. He received the silver medal at the Saint Louis Exposition in 1904; gold medals at the International Exposition, Munich, in 1905, and at the Paris Salon in 1913 (the first American so honored); and was awarded the medal of honor at the Panama–Pacific International Exposition in 1915. Parker was also the president of the Rodin Studios corporation, which developed an artists' cooperative housing of the same name in New York City.

He died at age 86 in Pasadena, California.
