= Aaron T. Demarest =

American businessman

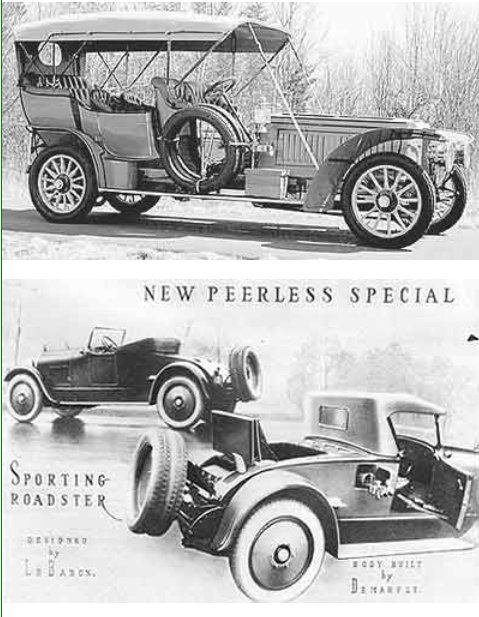
Circa 1911 Demarest automobile bodies in advertisements

Aaron T. Demarest (1841 – July 13, 1908) was an American carriage manufacturer and automobile body manufacturer. He built carriages in New York City for forty-eight years and luxury automobile bodies for six years.

== Biography ==
Demarest was born in Nyack, New York in 1841. In 1855 he moved to New York City. Five years later he started his own business. The business was located on Park Place.

In 1873 Demarest and his partner bought the carriage manufacturer Lawrence, Bradley and Pardee Company. The factory located at 61-67 Chapel Street in New Haven, Connecticut, grew to almost 200 workmen. In 1915 production of horse carriages stopped altogether and the factory closed.

Demarest incorporated as A. T. Demarest Company around 1899.

== Retirement and death ==
One source says Demarest died after contracting ptomaine poisoning at a clambake following his grandson's graduation from Yale. Another source says he had had a stroke and turned over his business to his brother, William R. Demarest and son, Warren G. Demarest. They then ran the business with the firm's secretary, Gabriel C. Chevalier. Demarest died July on 13, 1908, in Greenwich.

== Sources ==
- Carriage, Industry (1908). Motor Body, Paint and Trim.
- Chrystie, Thomas Ludlow (1915). Supplement to the Law and Practice of Inheritance Taxation in the State of New York, 1914–1915. Banks Law Publishing Company : Baker, Voorhis.
- Lawrence; Bradley; Pardee (1998). Carriages and Sleighs: 200 Illustrations from the 1862 Lawrence, Bradley, and Pardee Catalog. Courier Corporation. ISBN 978-0-486-40219-2.
