= Stewart R. Mott Foundation =

The Stewart R. Mott Foundation (formerly the Stewart R. Mott Charitable Trust) was a charitable trust founded by Stewart Rawlings Mott in the United States in 1926 that gave small grants to organizations working in the following areas:

- peace, arms control and foreign policy;
- population issues, international family planning and reproductive rights;
- government reform and public policy and
- human rights, civil rights and civil liberties.

Donation recipients include City Year, American Civil Liberties Union, National Wildlife Federation, NPR, World Wildlife Fund, and more. The foundation closed on June 30, 2022. Its founder, Stewart Rawlings Mott, died in June 2008.
