= The Galleria (Manhattan) =

Building in Manhattan, New York

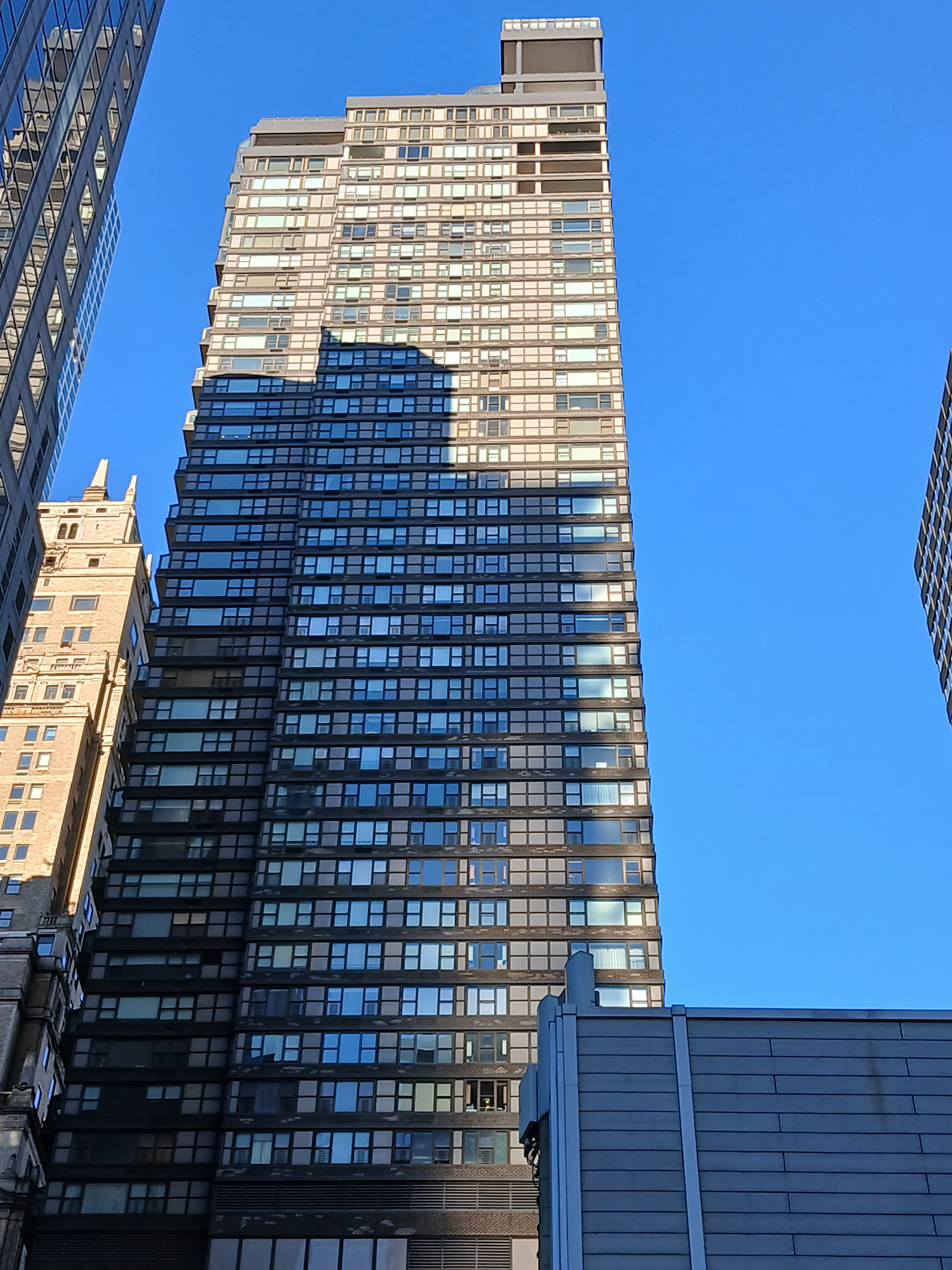
- Seen from Lexington Avenue
- Interactive map of the The Galleria area

General information
- Location: 115–119 East 57th Street, Manhattan, New York, US
- Coordinates: 40°45′42″N 73°58′11″W
- Year built: 1972–1975
- Owner: Moinian Group (commercial condominium); Various (residential condominiums)

Height
- Height: 544 ft (166 m)

Technical details
- Floor count: 55

Design and construction
- Architects: David Kenneth Specter, Philip Birnbaum

Other information
- Number of units: 254 (253 residences, 1 commercial condominium)

The Galleria is a mixed-use skyscraper at 115–119 East 57th Street in the Midtown Manhattan neighborhood of New York City, New York, U.S. The Galleria was designed by David Kenneth Specter with associate architect Philip Birnbaum, and it measures 55 stories high, with a roof height of 544 feet (166 m). The building has an eight-story atrium wing facing south toward 57th Street, which has a granite facade and a sloping ceiling. Behind the atrium section is the residential tower, which faces 58th Street to the north; it features "winter garden" balconies enclosed by glass. The commercial section of the building spans 16 stories, while the residential portion, with 253 apartments, spans 38 stories. The top of the building includes a four-story penthouse initially built for the philanthropist Stewart Rawlings Mott, who never lived there.

The Galleria was one of several large apartment buildings developed in the area following the implementation of the 1961 Zoning Resolution. Madison Equities proposed a mixed-use office and apartment building on 57th Street in early 1972, and it was completed in 1975. After the building went bankrupt, Morgan Guaranty bought the land and both parts of the building in August 1976 and sold off many of the remaining apartments. The building's atrium remained underused through the early 1980s. Through the 21st century, the Galleria continued to operate as a condominium building. Joseph Moinian acquired the Galleria's commercial condominium in 2002.

== Site ==
The Galleria is at 115–119 East 57th Street in the Midtown Manhattan neighborhood of New York City. (Note: Different sources give varying address numbers of 115, 117, or 119.) It occupies a T-shaped site in the middle of a city block bounded by 57th Street to the south, Lexington Avenue to the east, 58th Street to the north, and Park Avenue to the west. The land lot covers approximately 17,200 square feet (1,598 m^{2}). It has a frontage of 60 feet (18 m) on 57th Street, a frontage of 112 feet (34 m) on 58th Street, and a depth of 200 feet (61 m) between 57th and 58th streets. The city block is shared with the Ritz Tower to the west and 135 East 57th Street to the east. In addition, 731 Lexington Avenue is to the northeast, while 432 Park Avenue is to the southwest.

== Architecture ==
The Galleria was designed by David Kenneth Specter, while the apartment interiors were designed by associate architect Philip Birnbaum. It measures 55 stories high, with a roof height of 544 feet (166 m). The highest floor is numbered 57. The building is made of reinforced concrete, brick, granite, quarry tile, and concrete masonry units, and the design also includes terrazzo floor tiles and glass windows. A brick and granite cladding is used to cover up the concrete frame.

=== Form and facade ===
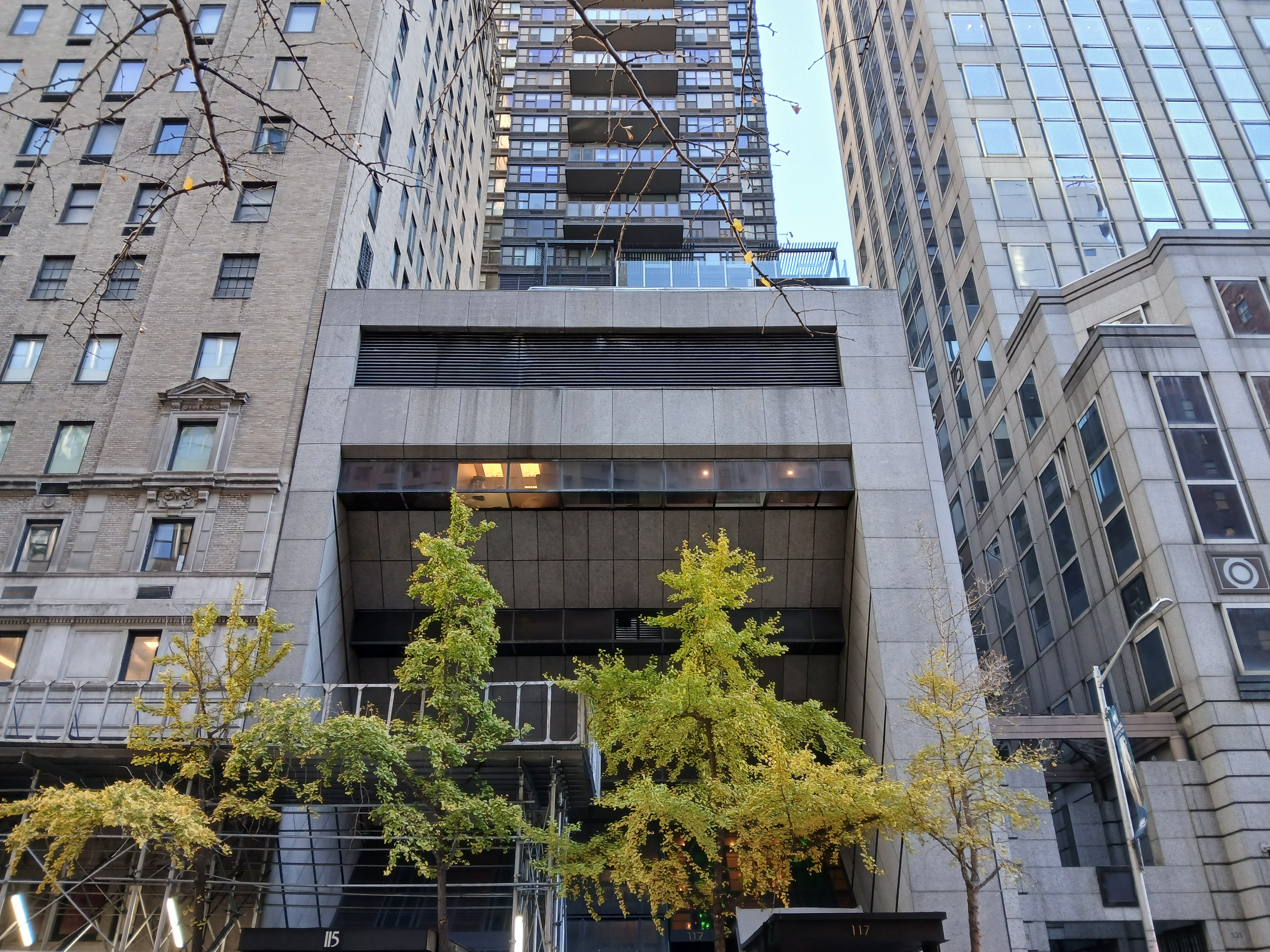
Atrium entrance

The building has an eight-story atrium wing, which was included at the suggestion of Jaquelin T. Robertson, a city planner with the New York City government. The atrium has a low-rise entrance on 57th Street, complementing the low-rise nature of the other buildings that once existed to the east. A glass column separates the entrances to the atrium and the residential stories above. The ceiling of the entrance slopes downward at a 45-degree angle, concealing the lower stories' offices; stairs ascend outside the entrance to the upper-story lobby. Although the city's zoning code required that the atrium include openings at both ends measuring 12 feet (3.7 m) high, without any doors or other obstructions, Specter added doors at both of the atrium's entrances to provide climate control. The rest of the atrium has granite walls.

Behind the atrium section on 57th Street is the residential tower, which faces 58th Street to the north. The tower rises straight from the 58th Street facade, extending 47 stories above the atrium wing. The placement of the tower was necessitated because of the lot's shape, which widens toward the back, and because the owners of the neighboring Ritz Tower also owned an easement that required the tower to be set back at least 20 feet (6.1 m) from the Ritz Tower's eastern wall. The upper-story facade includes double hung windows and brick, similar to conventional apartment buildings on nearby Third Avenue.

There are nearly-square "winter garden" balconies enclosed by glass, which are placed on alternating floors, allowing each winter garden to have a glass ceiling unobstructed by a balcony above. The winter gardens each measure 13 by 13 1/3 feet (4.0 m × 4.1 m) across and are placed on the southern sides of odd-numbered stories. To avoid having the winter gardens count toward the official floor area under zoning regulations, they cannot be used as bedrooms. The winter gardens have doors that separate them from their respective apartments, and they are heated internally. When the building opened, apartments with winter gardens were typically sold for higher prices than the other apartments. The winter gardens, a novelty for New York City apartment buildings, were popularized in later years.

=== Features ===
As designed, the building has a total of 458,945 square feet (42,637.4 m^{2}) and was split into 254 ownership condominiums, with one condominium unit for all the commercial space. There were originally 253 apartments, comprising the penthouse and 252 other units. Mechanically, the building uses different cooling and heating systems for the perimeter and the core portions of each floor.

The underlying bedrock descends from just beneath ground level to 40 feet (12 m) deep, requiring deep footings in some places. Since the building was constructed with a roof garden with 2,000 short tons (1,800 long tons; 1,800 t) of soil, for a maximum load of 600 pounds per square foot (2,900 kg/m^{2}), the rest of the building was structurally reinforced for this purpose. The entire building has a concrete superstructure, making it New York City's largest poured-in-place concrete building at the time. The lowest 22 stories have a high-strength concrete frame that can handle loads of up to 6,000 pounds per square inch (41,000 kPa). Since the lower and upper portions of the building have columns in different locations, the 15th story contains 12-foot-deep (3.7 m) girders that transfer loads between the upper and lower columns. Cantor Seinuk designed the building's structural system.

==== Atrium ====
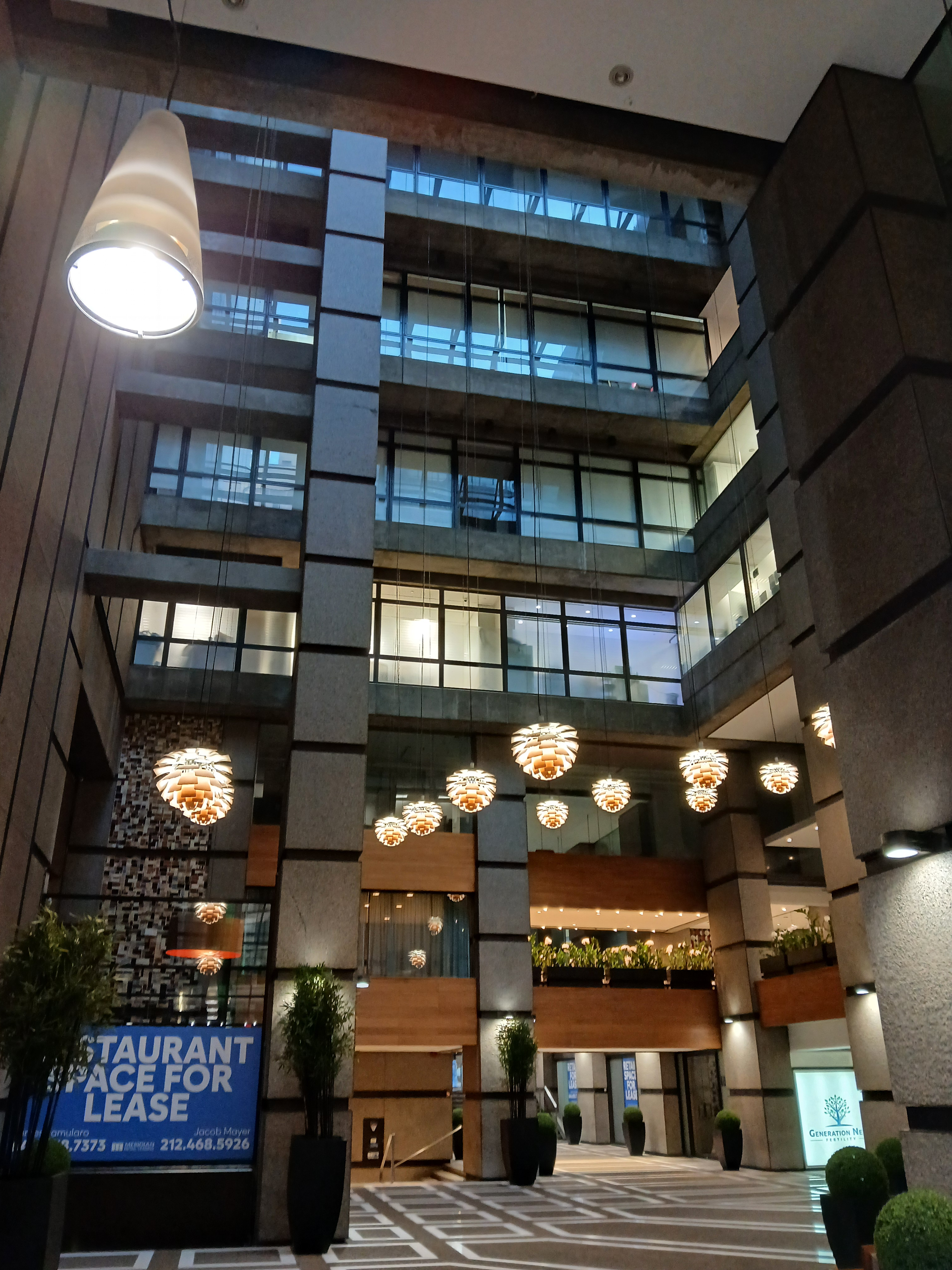
Interior of atrium

In exchange for constructing the atrium, the developers were given a zoning bonus in the form of additional floor area; the law granting this bonus was still being written when the building was designed, so the Galleria does not make full use of this bonus. (Note: More specifically, the law allowed buildings to include an additional 14 square feet (1.3 m^{2}) for every square foot of atrium, provided the atrium had a minimum height and width of 30 feet (9.1 m) and a minimum area of 3,000 square feet (280 m^{2}). The building was designed under the assumption that the bonus would be 11 square feet (1.0 m^{2}) for every square foot of atrium.) The presence of the atrium allowed the building to include an additional 57,588 square feet (5,350.1 m^{2}). The building's atrium extends through the entire block from 57th to 58th Street, accessed by 12 steps descending from the 57th Street entrance. A passageway flanked by stores leads north from the entrance, with a 30-foot-high (9.1 m) ceiling. The passageway itself is decorated with granite walls, steel beams, and tile-and-terrazzo floors, while the stores span 15,000 square feet (1,400 m^{2}).

The central portion of the atrium has a ceiling skylight rising to 90 feet (27 m) or 100 feet (30 m). The skylight is supported by three girders and is tilted at a 45-degree angle. This portion of the atrium is crossed by numerous pedestrian bridges, and the walls have granite slabs with horizontal steel channels. There are a cafe and a seating niche on either side of the atrium's central portion, both with skylights in their ceilings.

==== Commercial and residential space ====
The commercial section of the building spans 16 stories, including a 94-space parking garage on two levels. The lower five stories of the atrium are surrounded by offices. Three intermediate stories above these offices originally contained the Atrium Club, a membership-only private club, which was designed by Ellen McCluskey Associates and spans 35,000 square feet (3,300 m^{2}). It included lounges, dining spaces, swimming pools, and decorated spaces such as a music room with mirrored walls. In the 1990s, the Atrium Club space became part of a 41,000-square-foot (3,800 m^{2}) space for the New York Health and Racquet Club, which also occupies part of a fourth story. Above the atrium are four additional stories of offices. The building has about 135,000 square feet (12,500 m^{2}) of commercial space in total, including 80,000 square feet (7,400 m^{2}) that is used as office space.

There are 38 stories of apartments above the offices. The upper stories were originally divided into eight apartments each, with a single two-bedroom apartment, three apartments of one bedroom each, and four studio apartments per floor. Originally, 109 of the apartments abutted winter gardens. Due to zoning regulations, and to attract wealthy tenants, each apartment's rooms measure at least 385 square feet (35.8 m^{2}). Part of floor 54 (physically the 52nd floor) includes a tenant amenity space, which spans 5,400 square feet (500 m^{2}) and has a fireplace, two outdoor terraces, a kitchen, and a bar. The presence of the amenity area was also mandated by the zoning regulation, which required 6.25 square feet (5,810 cm^{2}) of tenant amenity space for each room in an apartment. All tenants could use the amenity area, housekeeping, and other services, which included butlers, maids, valets, and multilingual concierges.

The portion of floor 54 not occupied by the amenity space, and the three floors above it, originally had a penthouse built for the philanthropist Stewart Rawlings Mott, though he never lived there. The penthouse was designed by Gerald L. Jonas. It has a library, two living rooms spanning multiple levels, and five or six bedrooms. There is also a private elevator, a 6-by-15-foot (1.8 by 4.6 m) swimming pool, and terraces spanning a combined 7,000 square feet (650 m^{2}). The unit was intended to include a garden with trees. To accommodate Mott's requirements, one bedroom faced east toward the rising sun, while the unit's personal office faced west to allow Mott to view the sunset; in addition, the penthouse did not have air-conditioning or double-glazed windows because Mott wanted sunlight.

== History ==
=== Development ===
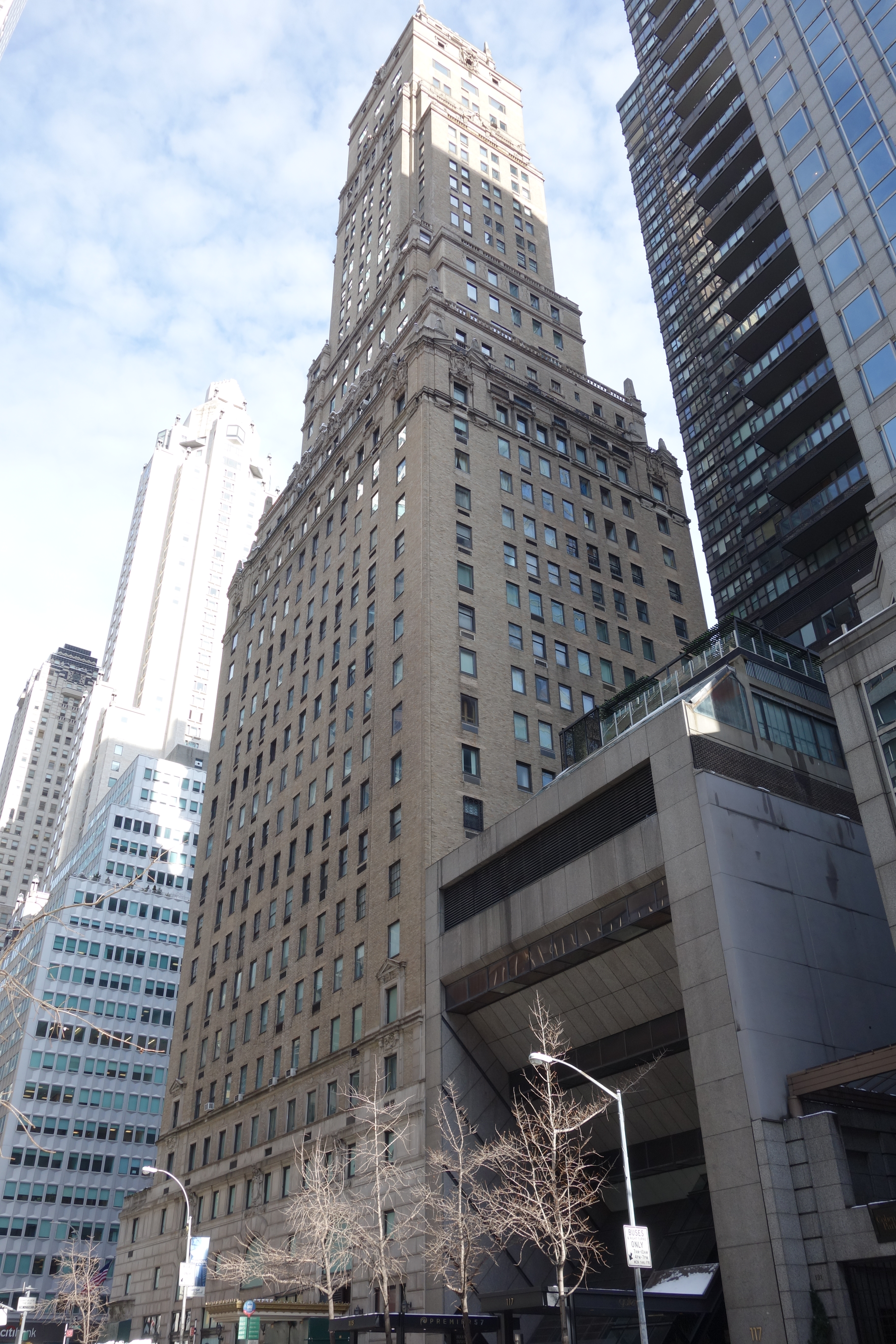
Entrance on 57th Street, with the Ritz Tower at left

The Galleria was one of several large apartment buildings developed in the area following the implementation of the 1961 Zoning Resolution. Edwin J. Glickman of Madison Equities had acquired seven land lots and two neighboring buildings' air rights in 1967, planning an office tower there, but he changed his plans after demand for office space decreased. Madison Equities proposed a mixed-use office and apartment building on 57th Street in early 1972, following a modification to the 1961 zoning code; previously, the zoning code had banned the construction of such buildings. That February, Mayor John Lindsay announced plans for two privately-developed mixed-use skyscrapers in Midtown Manhattan, one of which was to be Madison Equities' $20 million building on 57th Street. David Specter's original design called for 35 residential floors above a series of stores, offices, and a spacious public atrium. It was the first major structure designed by Specter, who had previously built single-family homes for the most part.

Originally, the plans called for a tower of 45 or 46 stories. By 1973, Glickman had revised the plans to 52 stories. at which point costs had increased to $30 million. The top penthouse was supposed to be occupied by the philanthropist Stewart Rawlings Mott. Construction had reached the 13th story by late 1973. Since the building was to include enclosed balconies, the New York City Board of Estimate had to approve a zoning change to permit them; the board approved the plans that December, with restrictions on how the balconies could be used. Because the building had been developed on an "underutilized" plot, which previously had consisted mostly of low-rise residential buildings, it qualified for a tax abatement worth millions of dollars.

Madison Equities had tried to acquire land to the east, extending to Lexington Avenue, but were initially unable to obtain a large portion of the site from the Wallace family before construction started. The Wallaces agreed to lease the land to Madison Equities in December 1972, and Glickman transferred some of the air rights from that site to the Galleria, allowing the building to include three additional stories' worth of floor area. In conjunction with the Galleria development, Glickman promised the local Manhattan Community Board 5 that he would construct a public park on 57th Street. This did not happen; when Madison Equities developed the neighboring 135 East 57th Street a decade later, the group instead decided to construct a plaza outside that building. To attract tenants, Madison Equities constructed models of apartments on one story and opened them to the public for several months, recording 50,000 visitors.

=== Opening and early years ===
The Galleria's unconventional ownership arrangement, consisting of both condominiums owned directly by tenants and indirectly through housing cooperatives, required approval from the Internal Revenue Service. Madison Equities owned the commercial space and the underlying land, while the apartments were owned by four separate groups, two each for businesses and residential buyers who wanted either condos or co-ops. This arrangement enabled tenants to select the ownership option that was more financially advantageous to them; the co-op owners bought shares in the corporations that owned their apartments. while condo owners obtained mortgage loans. The Galleria was one of a few buildings in the city that sold corporate condominiums; these tenants paid higher fees, allowing residential tenants to pay less. The New York Attorney General's office had to approve a prospectus for the condos before any of them could be sold; the prospectus was approved in mid-1975. Due to the complicated ownership structure, the commercial and residential prospectuses were hundreds of pages long, and two lawyers were hired to assist with sales.

Though the building was substantially completed in 1975, the penthouse interior was unfinished at the time. The building overall had cost $40 million; it had been financed by a $49 million construction loan from the Morgan Guaranty Trust Company. Madison Equities cited the penthouse's cost at $3.5 million, three times that unit's original projected cost, while the atrium cost another $1 million. The structure had been the first apartment building in New York City to rise higher than 50 stories. Mott refused to move into the penthouse, saying its final cost was more than double the original estimate, and the unit was placed for sale. Mott continued to negotiate sporadically with the developers, and ultimately, he never moved in. After the building went bankrupt, Morgan Guaranty bought the land and both parts of the building in August 1976. At the time, the office space was two-thirds occupied, and Morgan Guaranty was also preparing a revised condominium offering with lower apartment prices.

The new owners advertised the apartments in several languages, and they had earned $15 million from apartment sales by mid-1977. At that point, the commercial space was 95% occupied by tenants including the Mexican government's trade agency, along with shipping, entertainment, advertising, and real-estate firms. By contrast, the atrium was hardly ever used and was generally unknown to the public, serving instead as a de facto private space for tenants. Two-thirds of the original tenants came from outside the United States, particularly from Europe, South America, and the East Asia and Pacific region. Morgan Guaranty sold the building's commercial space for $10.953 million in 1979 to a group represented by Lazlo Tauber; the company had found tenants for all the apartments by then. Mott's penthouse was sold that year to the Venezuelan businessman Jose DiMase.

=== 1980s to present ===
The building's atrium remained underused in the early 1980s, and the New York Daily News described it as one of the "two great phantom malls" in New York City, the other being at Olympic Tower. The atrium also lacked several required amenities such as benches and stores. This prompted city building officials to revoke alteration permits and other routine approvals unless amenities were installed in the atrium, which the owners of the commercial space quickly did. By the middle of the decade, there was a restaurant in the atrium. The Nippon Club was also briefly housed at the Galleria in the late 1980s and early 1990s.

A food hall called Nonna opened across three of the lower stories in 1995. By that year, the building's manager, Gumley-Haft Real Estate, had appointed a board of managers who instituted a freeze on steadily-increasing fees, along with refurbishing some common areas. As a result of these changes, average sales prices at the building increased. The Atrium Club abruptly shuttered in February 1996 due to financial issues, and the New York Health & Racquet Club acquired the Atrium Club space. The magician David Copperfield obtained the penthouse apartment in 1997, furnishing it with antique games and other objects relating to magic tricks. By that decade, the building had 246 apartments. Another restaurant, Cafe Adriana, opened in the building around 1998, followed by Cafe Bubuline in 2001. Through the beginning of the 21st century, the Galleria continued to operate as a condominium building, although potential residents were screened for eligibility, much like housing cooperative residents were.

Joseph Moinian acquired the Galleria's commercial condominium in 2002, paying $50 million. Moinian received a $60 million loan from Wachovia and subsequently announced plans for a spa. After this loan matured, Moinian attempted to refinance the offices in 2012 but had difficulty finding a lender. A spa opened at the building in 2014, though it was forced to temporarily close due to complaints and building code violations. The pool in Copperfield's apartment burst in 2015, damaging elevators and causing water damage in apartments up to 30 stories beneath his penthouse. In 2024, the building's condominium board sued Copperfield for abandoning his penthouse and declining to repair damage there. The New York Times reported at the time that the last time Copperfield had visited the apartment was unknown and that, in the meantime, mold damage and floods had beset the building.

== Notable residents ==
Notable early tenants included producer David Merrick and songwriter Jerry Leiber. Actress Lory Del Santo, whose son fell to his death from one of the building's windows in 1991, lived in a duplex apartment near the top of the building. Another duplex owner was the federal government of the United Arab Emirates, which owned an apartment there from 1978 to 2002.

== Reception ==
=== Contemporary ===
When the building was developed, The New York Times deemed it "perhaps the most flamboyant and innovative skyscraper under construction in the city". Paul Goldberger, writing for the same newspaper, called it "more eccentric and more frankly dramatic" compared with the nearly contemporary Olympic Tower, citing the atrium and the design of the 57th Street entrance.

Following the building's completion, it received an award from the Concrete Industry Board. The Christian Science Monitor said that the Galleria "fits in, rather than looking, as so many major buildings do, as if it were foisted upon the city's scale". Carter B. Horsley of the Times called the Galleria and the Olympic Tower among the city's "most striking examples of multi-use construction", while Boston Globe writer Robert Campbell called the Galleria "one of the best, most innovative buildings recently built" in the core of an American city. Progressive Architecture regarded the overall design as "disjointed" because the atrium wing and the tower looked so different from each other. Goldberger wrote in 1976 that the 57th Street entrance had a "gaping mouth" that was worth visiting. Conversely, other reviewers quoted in Architectural Record felt that some design details, such as the sloped entrance, felt "unresolved".

There was also commentary about the atrium. Progressive Architecture magazine described the atrium as combining the city's muted color palette with elements of John C. Portman Jr.'s and Frank Lloyd Wright's designs, Ada Louise Huxtable wrote in 1978 that, despite Specter's grand intentions for the building's atrium, the space was a failure because it remained largely unused. The New York Daily News called the atrium "one of New York's premier phantom parks", while another writer, for the National Review, similarly said in 1983 that the atrium was less successful than others in the city. Goldberger nonetheless wrote that the Galleria's and Olympic Tower's atriums had inspired similar public spaces around the city.

=== Retrospective ===
In 1995, the architect Robert A. M. Stern wrote that the Galleria's design "made all the right urbanistic moves", specifically citing the juxtaposition of the low-rise atrium entrance and the tower behind it, although he criticized the "crude repetitiousness of the facade". Penelope Green wrote in 2003 that "you feel the goofiness of the 1970's, but you also feel a sort of optimism" when walking through the building. The fifth edition of the AIA Guide to New York City described the building as "pretentious, but it has some grounds to be so", and Curbed characterized the penthouse as a "spaceship-like assemblage of glass levels".
