= 135 East 57th Street =

Building in Manhattan, New York

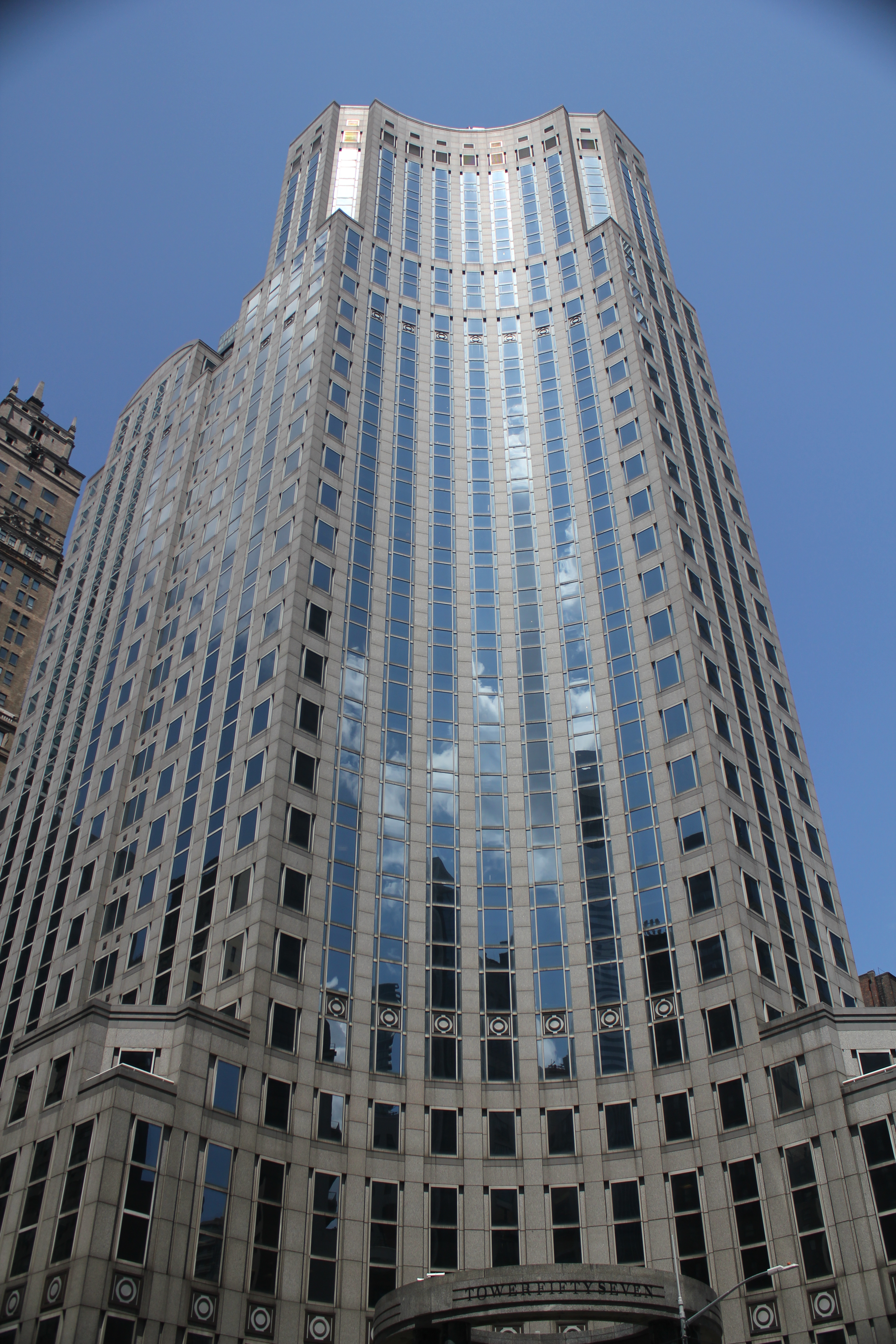
- View from the ground
- Interactive map of the 135 East 57th Street area

General information
- Architectural style: Postmodern
- Location: 135 East 57th Street, Manhattan, New York, US
- Coordinates: 40.7614°N 73.9693°W
- Construction started: 1985
- Opened: 1987
- Owner: TF Cornerstone

Height
- Height: 430 ft (130 m)

Technical details
- Floor count: 32
- Floor area: 456,000 ft^{2} (42,400 m^{2})

Design and construction
- Architect: Kohn Pedersen Fox

135 East 57th Street (also known as Tower 57) is a skyscraper at in the Midtown Manhattan neighborhood of New York City, United States. Designed by Kohn Pedersen Fox, it was built in 1987 and stands at the northwest corner of the intersection of 57th Street and Lexington Avenue. The building was constructed in a postmodern style, with Art Moderne influences, and measures 430 feet (130 m) tall with about 32 stories. The facade consists mostly of gray granite, and the massing or general shape consists of a high-rise shaft curving around a plaza at the street corner. The interior covers about 456,000 square feet (42,400 m^{2}) and includes two retail basements, a neoclassical lobby, and offices above.

135 East 57th Street was developed by Madison Equities, which had also developed the Galleria immediately to the west. Although Madison Equities had leased the site from the Wallace family in 1972, work on the tower did not begin until 1985, amid legal disputes. The building was substantially completed in 1987, initially with an art and antiques dealership, Place des Antiquaires, in the basements. Though most of the office space was occupied by 1990, Madison Equities surrendered ownership to the holders of the building's mortgage loan in 1992. The Cohen Brothers group bought the building's leasehold in 1997 and renovated the lobby and plaza. TF Cornerstone acquired the building in 2025 and announced plans to convert it into apartments.

== Site ==
135 East 57th Street, also known as Tower 57, is at the northwest corner of 57th Street and Lexington Avenue in the Midtown Manhattan neighborhood of New York City. It occupies much of the eastern half of a city block bounded by 57th Street to the south, Lexington Avenue to the east, 58th Street to the north, and Park Avenue to the west. The land lot is arranged in an irregular T shape, covering 26,731 square feet (2,483.4 m^{2}). The plot has frontage of 120 feet (37 m) along Lexington Avenue, 215 feet (66 m) along 57th Street, and 37 feet (11 m) in the middle of the block along 58th Street. The city block is shared with the Ritz Tower and The Galleria to the west, while 731 Lexington Avenue is to the northeast.

Since the 1940s, the Wallace family had owned the land under the site. The corner site was previously occupied by a modernist building at 137 East 57th Street, designed by Thompson & Churchill. This building, constructed in the International Style or Bauhaus style, was designed in 1931 and is variously cited as having six or seven stories. Unusually for buildings of its time, 137 East 57th Street had a mostly-glass facade with small amounts of colored terracotta; the facade was cantilevered from interior columns, and there had been no columns at the corner. A series of rowhouses extended west of there, rising two to eight stories each.

== Architecture ==
The building was designed by Kohn Pedersen Fox and was constructed in a postmodern style, with Art Moderne influences. It is variously cited as having 31, 32 or 34 stories. The building measures 430 feet (130 m) tall.

=== Exterior ===
When the building was constructed, its main entrances were placed on 57th Street to the south, while a narrow wing with a loading dock extended northward to 58th Street. The facade consists mostly of gray granite, while some of the decorations are made of black granite, green marble, and bronze. The massing, or general shape, consists of a high-rise shaft curving around a plaza at the street corner. The 57th Street facade in general is divided horizontally into three sections, similarly to a column's base, shaft, and capital. The western portion of the site contains a 27-story-high wing, which is attached to the primary 32-story mass and is set back from five storefronts at the base. This design was necessitated by a zoning change partway during the design process.

The curved corner includes the entrance to the office space. It surrounds a plaza with an open-air tempietto, consisting of a series of 30-foot-tall (9.1 m) columns. This plaza covers 5,000 square feet (460 m^{2}) and has a fountain, marble decorations, and plants. The presence of the plaza allowed the building's developers to receive a zoning bonus, which increased the floor space by 25% compared with a similarly-sized building that lacked a plaza. Due to its location at the site's southeast corner, it initially received sunlight throughout much of the day.

=== Interior ===
The interior covers approximately 456,000 square feet (42,400 m^{2}). Two basement stories originally contained Place des Antiquaires, a 50,000-square-foot (4,600 m^{2}) marketplace for antique and art dealers. The basement space was accessed by a set of escalators. It included marble concourses with classical-style niches for dealers, patterned after Paris's Louvre des Antiquaires. There were initially approximately 90 storefronts, each with 275 square feet (25.5 m^{2}) on average. Place des Antiquaires was built in the basement because it did not fall under zoning regulations, as the above-ground floors did. The basements were designed to accommodate other tenants if the marketplace failed; the space ultimately became a department store in the 1990s.

The lobby is designed in a green and grayscale color palette, with steel, plaster, granite, and marble decorations in a neoclassical style. It has two murals by Gerald Coltat, which depict various subjects upon a gold background, along with two statues and various urns with flowers. The lowest three stories had 34,000 square feet (3,200 m^{2}); the first and second stories were used exclusively for retail, while the third story could be used as either offices or retail. The lower-story shops were initially supposed to span 3,500 to 6,000 square feet (330 to 560 m^{2}) each, but the building's first retail tenant, Louis of Boston, combined all of these spaces.

The offices above the third story were variously cited as covering 325,000 square feet (30,200 m^{2}), 340,000 square feet (32,000 m^{2}), or 350,000 square feet (33,000 m^{2}). Unusually for a late-20th-century office building in New York City, much of the interior space is illuminated by natural light; each of the building's stories has between 57,000 and 14,000 square feet (5,300 and 1,300 m^{2}). Five stories atop the building span 6,750 square feet (627 m^{2}), and one story was also built with a double-height ceiling.

== History ==
=== Development ===
135 East 57th Street was developed by Madison Equities, which had also developed the Galleria immediately to the west; that structure, completed in 1975, had 55 stories. Madison Equities had tried to acquire land to the east, extending to Lexington Avenue, but were initially unable to obtain a large portion of the site from the Wallace family. The Wallaces agreed to lease the land to Madison Equities in December 1972, and Madison Equities had completed its acquisitions (except for a small parcel near Lexington Avenue and 58th Street) by 1974. The company's leader at the time, Edwin Glickman, eventually planned to build a second tower on the Lexington Avenue site; in the meantime, he transferred some of the air rights from that site to the Galleria, allowing that building to include three additional stories' worth of floor area. In conjunction with the Galleria development, Glickman promised the local Manhattan Community Board 5 that he would construct a public park on 57th Street, but this did not happen. By the early 1980s, Madison Equities' buildings east of the Galleria were mostly vacant, except for some businesses at street level.

The site's architect Kohn Pedersen Fox (KPF) initially drew up plans for a 21-story building without a public plaza. While on a trip to Paris, Robert Gladstone, by then the leader of Madison Equities, devised the idea for an antique dealership at the building. Midway through the design process, in 1982, the city government rezoned the western portion of the site as part of a new Midtown zoning district, prompting KPF to redesign the building. The revised design included a 28-story tower to the west, recessed from a low-rise retail section, and a 34-story tower to the east. The Wallace family moved to terminate Madison Equities' lease in 1983, claiming the firm had raised rents and demolished an existing building in violation of its lease. The New York City Landmarks Preservation Commission had considered designating 137 East 57th Street as a city landmark the previous year. The designation hearing was canceled after Madison Equities received demolition permits; the New York Supreme Court, Appellate Division, refused to block the permits. Though the attempted lease cancellation was ultimately unsuccessful, it delayed the start of construction.

Robert Gladstone announced in late 1985 that he would begin constructing a 32-story skyscraper on the site, which was to include Place des Antiquaires, a complex for art and antique dealers. Unlike other New York City skyscrapers that were built for specific anchor tenants, Madison Equities developed the building without any major tenant in mind. The development was initially supposed to include low-rise, townhouse-style shops and boutiques on 57th Street; as built, the shops were integrated into the tower's base. During the tower's construction, the city government issued dozens of summonses to the building's main contractor HRH Construction for safety-code violations, including for missing safety equipment and absent safety managers. Additionally, the Wallace family sued the Gladstone family in 1986 after discovering that the Gladstones had made an agreement with the city to set aside part of the site as parkland, in violation of their lease.

=== Opening and early years ===
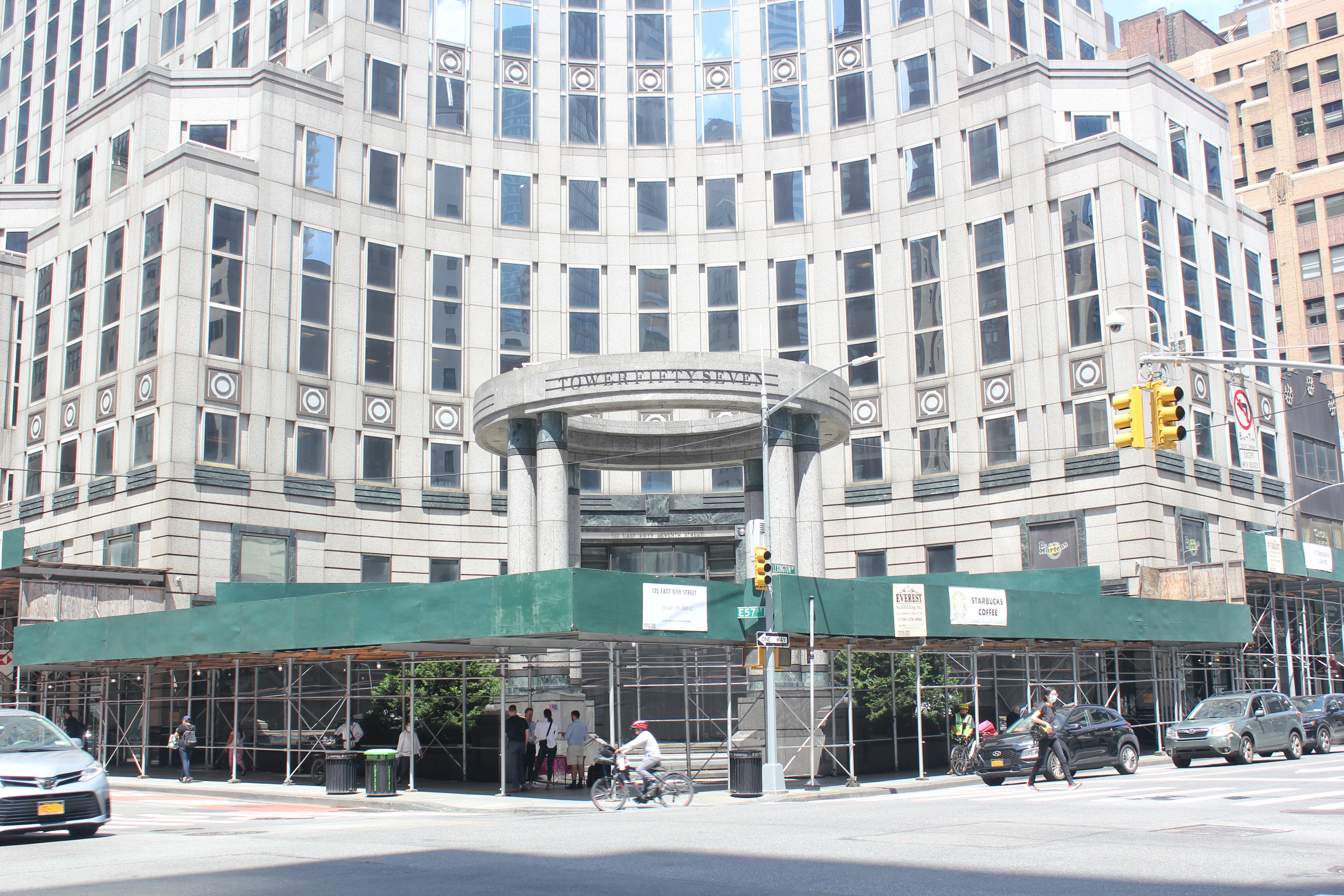
Ground-level tempietto

The building was substantially completed in 1987; it was one of several skyscrapers in eastern Midtown Manhattan that had been developed in the late 1980s to meet increasing office demand. Two firms were hired to lease out the building's space to American and European tenants. That October, the menswear store Louis, Boston leased the first through third floors. Place des Antiquaires opened in the basement the next month, initially with 34 dealers who hailed largely from Europe. Manufacturers Hanover Trust Company also took some space, opening a bank branch along Lexington Avenue. By mid-1988, all of the building's retail space had been leased, and interior fit-out was nearly complete. At the time, either one-third or half of the office space was occupied. The building's tenants initially included Dutch bank NMB Corporation (later ING Group), banking house TCR Corporation, document management firm Xerox, and beverage firm Moet-Hennessey. The antique center sometimes had up to 1,000 daily visitors, half the initial visitation estimates, though dealers were continuing to move in or expand their spaces.

Place des Antiquaires struggled to attract visitors due to the early 1990s recession and its basement location. The dealers' complex had only 10,000 to 14,000 monthly visitors by 1990, and its operators claimed that Madison Equities had refused to advertise the complex. Nine-tenths of the building's space was occupied, but the office tenants were paying less than the building's expenses and mortgage payments were worth. Three retail tenants, who collectively paid $2 million in annual rent, moved out simultaneously in 1990, leaving 135 East 57th Street's owners unable to make payments. By the next year, the Gladstones and their lenders were arguing over who should collect tenants' rent. Amid the financial uncertainty, the dealers' complex filed for Chapter 11 bankruptcy protection in June 1991. The Gladstone family also filed for bankruptcy protection, and the brokerage firm CBRE Group began collecting tenants' rents.

The holders of the building's mortgage—a consortium between the Alaska Permanent Fund, the Los Angeles Fire and Police Pension Fund, and the Teacher Retirement System of Texas—took over the building's leasehold in December 1992. Shortly afterward, the Wallace family again sought to evict the leaseholders, saying the building violated the lease. The office tower was nearly fully leased, but the antiques center was struggling financially, since the center lacked a director or an advertising budget. Place des Antiquaires closed entirely in 1994, and the space was leased to discount store Daffy's, which announced plans to renovate the basements. A pop-up store for Ikea opened in the building in 1995 and operated temporarily.

=== Cohen Brothers ownership ===
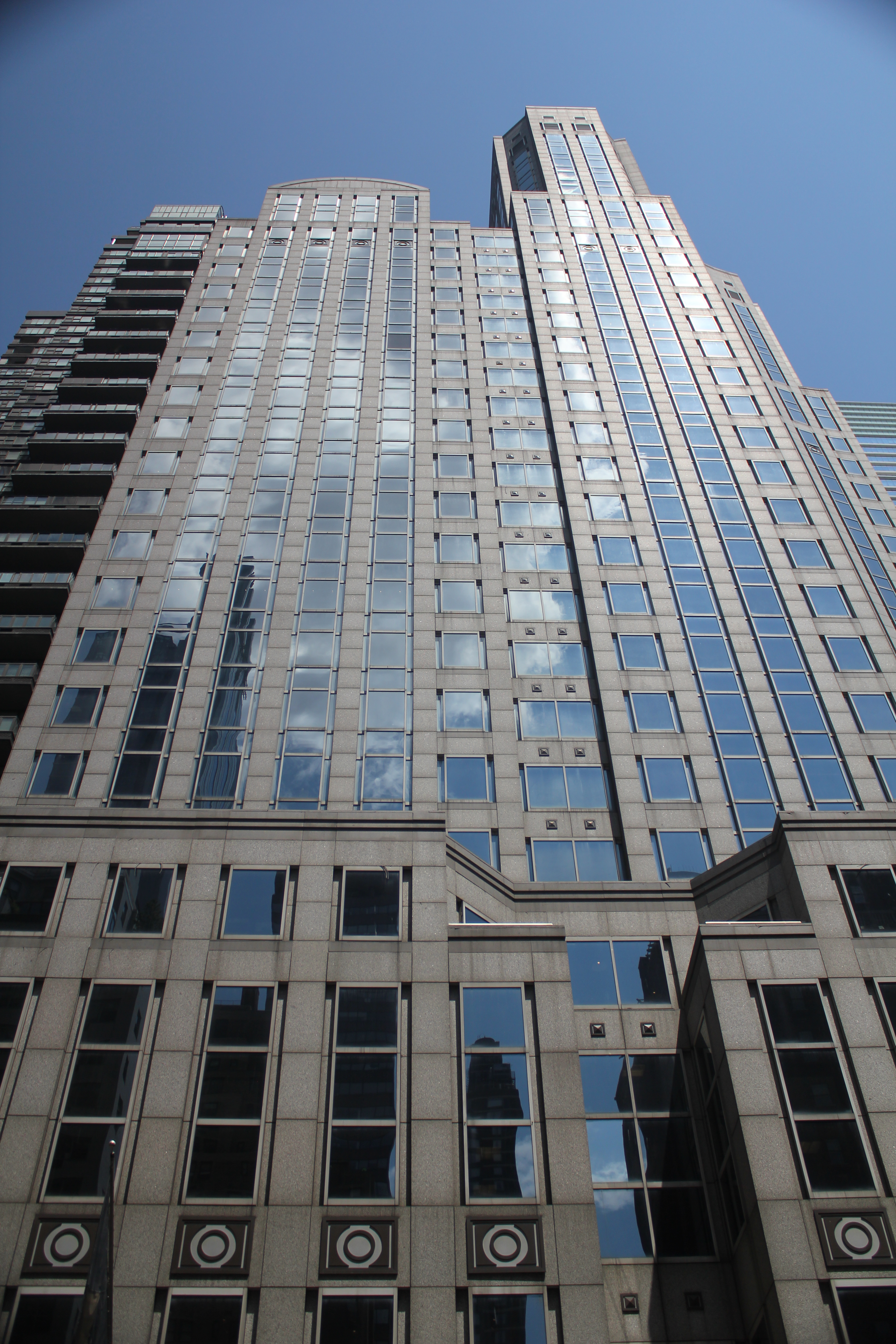
The main tower (right) and its west wing (left) from 57th Street

The mortgage lenders were trying to sell 135 East 57th Street by 1997; the Cohen Brothers group bought the building's leasehold that year, paying $114 million. After buying the building, Charles Steven Cohen hired Jacques Garcia to redesign the lobby and Thomas Balsley to redesign the plaza. The lobby renovation was completed in 1999; by then, the building had many financial-industry tenants and was fully occupied except for two floors. Some original tenants, including ING and Xerox, had moved out. During the 2000s, the financial services firm Cantor Fitzgerald temporarily used 135 East 57th Street as its headquarters. Daffy's moved out in 2012, and the basement retail space was vacant for three years. Saks Fifth Avenue subsequently opened a branch of its Off 5th store in the basement in 2015. The same year, Cohen announced plans to renovate the building for $7 million, renaming it Tower 57. At the time, the building had a variety of office tenants, including cosmetics and financial firm, while the surrounding stretch of 57th Street was being redeveloped as part of Billionaires' Row.

In 2022, Fortress Credit Corporation gave Cohen a $100 million loan to refinance the building. The next year, William Wallace sought to terminate Cohen's ground lease, citing that Cohen owed $4.2 million in back taxes and $9 million in overdue rent. Cohen claimed that Wallace had prevented him from converting the building to residential use. The New York Supreme Court ordered the building to be placed for sale in September 2024.

=== TF Cornerstone ownership ===
TF Cornerstone announced in August 2025 that it planned to convert the building into 350 apartments. The plans called for about one-quarter of the apartments to be set aside as affordable housing. TF Cornerstone signed a ground lease with Wallace that month. At the time, work on the residential conversion was scheduled to begin by June 2026 and take two to three years. Saks Fifth Avenue announced in late 2025 that it planned to close the Off 5th store, citing disruptions from the upcoming residential conversion; subsequently, Chelsea Piers Fitness leased the old Off 5th space.

== Reception and media ==
When the building was complete, it received acclaim. The writer Paul Goldberger called it "a startling success as a work of architecture and even more as a piece of urban design", saying the plaza complemented the curved massing and that the design was a reinterpretation of the mid-20th-century Art Moderne style. Goldberger later wrote that he felt the design was "a bit too fussy but has a splendid concave facade whose inventive curve is enough to make you forgive all". By contrast, the critic Suzanna Sirefman considered the massing to be "disconcerting", and the 2000 edition of the AIA Guide to New York City called the plaza "silly".

In 2013, the architectural historian Christopher Gray wrote that 135 East 57th Street was "one of the great architectural ripostes of New York, a lugubriously postmodern but definitely Classical folly", and that the plaza could well have accommodated the previous Bauhaus-style building at the corner. The design was depicted in the 2002 film Spider-Man as the Oscorp Tower. The building also features as the headquarters of the fictional E-Corp in USA Network's Mr. Robot.

== Sources ==
- Stern, Robert A. M.; Fishman, David; Tilove, Jacob (2006). New York 2000: Architecture and Urbanism Between the Bicentennial and the Millennium (2000 ed.). New York: Monacelli Press. ISBN 978-1-58093-177-9.
