= Stewart Rawlings Mott =

American philanthropist (1937–2008)

Stewart Rawlings Mott (December 4, 1937 – June 12, 2008) was an American philanthropist who founded the Stewart R. Mott Foundation. He was the son of Charles Stewart Mott (a co-founder of General Motors) and appeared on Nixon's Enemies List for his support of liberal causes.

== Biography ==
Stewart Rawlings Mott was born on December 4, 1937, in Flint, Michigan, to Charles Stewart Mott and Ruth Rawlings, Mr. Mott's fourth wife. Charles Mott, who had a company manufacturing wheels and axles at the beginning in the 1900s, took advantage of the auto industry’s rapid growth and sold his company to General Motors for stocks, becoming G.M.'s largest individual shareholder.

Mott attended the Massachusetts Institute of Technology for three years and finished his education at the Columbia University School of General Studies, earning two bachelor's degrees, one in business administration and one in comparative literature. Mott graduated in 1961 and inherited $6 million with $850,000 in annual income from two trust funds; Mott used his resources to create the first Planned Parenthood clinic in his hometown of Flint, Michigan. He wrote a thesis on Sophocles for a Master's Degree from Columbia, which he never finished. His philanthropy included abortion reform, birth control, sex research, feminism, arms control, gay rights, civil liberties, governmental reform, and research on extrasensory perception.

In the 1970s, Mott contracted for the purchase of a multimillion‐dollar quadruplex penthouse at The Galleria in New York City that he had designed to meet his specific needs—"allowing him to greet the sun on rising from his bed in the East Solarium and to watch it sink from a desk that faces west, all amid 10,000 square feet reserved for planting". By late 1975, never having occupied the penthouse, he was negotiating to get out of the purchase, whose price had risen to $3.5 million.

In 1978, Mott gave his occupation as "maverick" in the photo essay Cat People.

Shortly prior to his death Mott resided in Bermuda for most of his time, and also traveled to his numerous houses in the United States. His homes included a penthouse in 800 Park Avenue in Manhattan, a house trailer on a Florida farm, and a Chinese junk moored on the Hudson River in New York City.
