= Ritz Tower =

Residential building in Manhattan, New York

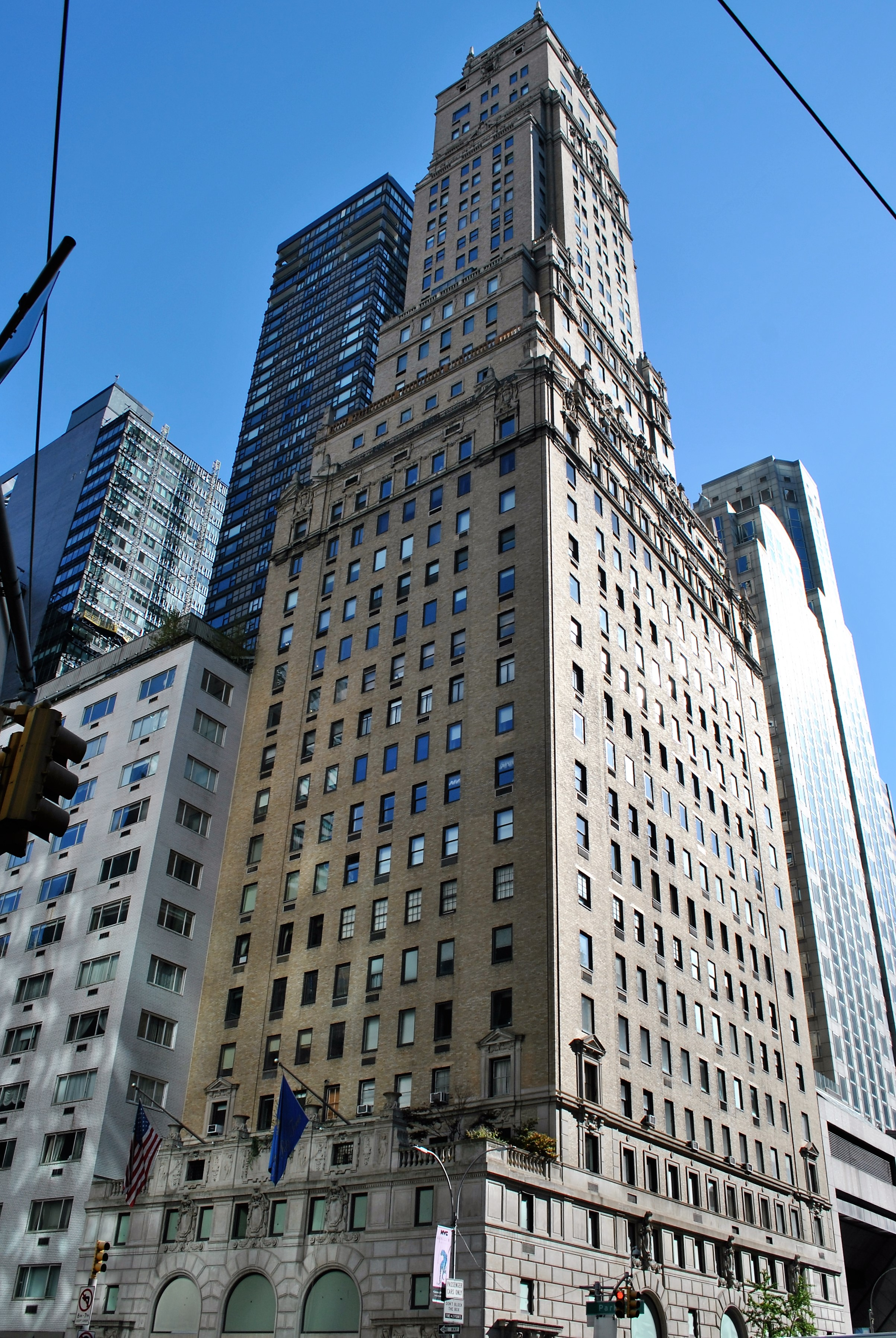

General information
- Architectural style: Beaux-Arts / Historism
- Location: 465 Park Avenue, Manhattan, New York
- Coordinates: 40°45′42″N 73°58′13″W
- Construction started: 1925
- Completed: 1927
- Opening: October 15, 1926

Height
- Height: 541 feet (165 m)

Technical details
- Floor count: 40

Design and construction
- Architects: Emery Roth; Thomas Hastings
- Developer: Arthur Brisbane

Website
- Official website

New York City Landmark
- Designated: October 29, 2002
- Reference no.: 2118

The Ritz Tower is a luxury residential building at 465 Park Avenue on the corner of East 57th Street in the Midtown Manhattan neighborhood of New York City. It was built from 1925 to 1926 as an apartment hotel and was designed by Emery Roth and Thomas Hastings for journalist Arthur Brisbane, who was the developer. The Ritz Tower is about 541 feet (165 m) with 41 stories, making it the tallest residential building in New York City upon its completion. Because it was initially classified as an apartment hotel, the building was constructed to a greater height than was usually permitted.

Its classically-inspired design contains numerous setbacks with balustrades, as well as windows with pilasters and pediments. The lower floors are highly ornamented, featuring sculpted putti and urns, as well as rusticated limestone blocks. The top of the tower has a pyramidal roof with a tall obelisk. The interior of the building uses rich materials, such as parquet floors and wood-paneled walls, all part of Brisbane's desire to make the Ritz Tower the most sought-after apartment hotel in the city. The tower had no individual kitchens in any of the 400 units. Residents over the years have included many personalities associated with the media. When the Ritz Tower was constructed, it received critical acclaim from architectural writers.

After the Ritz Tower opened on October 15, 1926, Brisbane contracted with the Ritz-Carlton Company to manage the building and the restaurants in it. Brisbane was soon unable to pay off the debt load and sold it to William Randolph Hearst, his longtime colleague and friend, in 1929. Hearst gave up the building to his bondholders in 1938 and the Ritz Tower became a housing cooperative in 1956. The retail space at the base has contained several restaurants and stores over the years, including Le Pavillon, one of the first authentic French restaurants in the U.S. In 2002, the New York City Landmarks Preservation Commission designated the Ritz Tower as a New York City landmark.

== Site ==
The Ritz Tower is at 465 Park Avenue, on the northeastern corner with 57th Street, in the Midtown Manhattan neighborhood of New York City. The building faces west toward Park Avenue and south toward 57th Street. It is near the Fuller Building and the Four Seasons Hotel New York to the west, 500 Park Avenue to the northwest, and 432 Park Avenue and 450 Park Avenue to the southwest. The city block is shared with The Galleria and 135 East 57th Street to the east.

The Ritz Tower occupies two land lots: a larger lot for residential and commercial use and a smaller lot for commercial and office use. The bulk of the building is on an L-shaped lot with an area of 10,247 square feet (952.0 m^{2}), a frontage of 112.5 feet (34.3 m) along 57th Street to the south, and a maximum depth of 100 feet (30 m). The corner lot at Park Avenue and 57th Street has an area of 1,401 feet (427 m), a frontage of 17.42 feet (5.31 m) along 57th Street to the south, and a frontage of 80.42 feet (24.51 m) along Park Avenue to the west. This arrangement exists because the developer, journalist Arthur Brisbane, never purchased the lot at the corner of Park Avenue and 57th Street. This lot contained a brownstone occupied the Roome family, who were loath to sell and instead leased the lot for $15,000 a year.

The site is at the intersection of two historically fashionable thoroughfares. By the late 19th century, the Park Avenue railroad line ran in an open cut in the middle of Park Avenue. The line was covered with the construction of Grand Central Terminal in the early 20th century, spurring development in the surrounding area, Terminal City. The adjacent stretch of Park Avenue became a wealthy neighborhood with upscale apartments. In the late 19th and early 20th centuries, East 57th Street largely contained homes and structures built for the arts. Many of the residential structures on 57th Street were replaced with offices, shops, and art galleries by the 1920s.

== Architecture ==
The building was designed by Emery Roth and Thomas Hastings and opened in 1926. Roth was the original architect; Hastings, a partner in the firm Carrère and Hastings, became involved in the project later on. Alexander S. Deserty was the consulting engineer. The Ritz Tower is variously characterized as 40, 41, or 42 stories tall, depending on whether the building's pinnacle is counted. The building has a height of 478 feet (146 m) to the roof above the highest story and 541 feet (165 m) to its pinnacle. (Note: The height is also given as 546 feet (166 m).) According to architecture writer Robert A. M. Stern, the building "pinpointed the nexus of fashionable apartment house living".

The Ritz Tower contains numerous setbacks to conform to the 1916 Zoning Resolution. There are setbacks on the fourth, 19th, 21st, 25th, and 33rd stories, as well as a pyramidal hip roof topped by an obelisk above the 40th floor. The fourth-story setback overlooks the three-story-tall corner lot on Park Avenue, which was leased from the Roome family. If the Roomes had ever taken back ownership of that lot, they could detach the setback section from the rest of the building, then install a staircase and elevator for their own use. The corner lot was never reverted to the Roome family, which sold the lot in the late 20th century. The other setbacks are mostly placed on all four sides of the building. The setbacks doubled as balconies for residents of the stories at which each setback was positioned.

=== Facade ===
The exterior of the Ritz Tower was designed during a transitional era of architecture in New York City, where architects were moving away from classical designs favoring Art Deco or modern classical designs. The building's lowest three stories are clad in rusticated blocks of limestone. The other stories are clad in tan brick, with Italian Renaissance-style terracotta ornament and articulation on all four sides. The design of the base was influenced mostly by Hastings's involvement, while Roth was more responsible for the upper stories. Steven Ruttenbaum described the upper stories' decoration as a "bolder and more aggressive type of ornament" than was used on the base, since the fine detail on the base would not have been noticed on higher stories.

The ornament is largely clustered around the base, setbacks, and top of the building, while the middle stories are comparatively bare. The setbacks contain finials and obelisks, which soften the perceived sharpness of the setbacks.

==== Base ====
Facing west on Park Avenue, the limestone base is divided vertically into five bays. The center three bays contain double-height round arches while the outer two bays contain rectangular doorways with elaborate stone entablatures. The northern doorway is the building's main entrance and the southern doorway contains an entrance to the ground-level retail space. On the third story, the center three bays each contain two rectangular windows, separated by cartouches and flanked by flat panels, while the outer two bays each contain a single opening within flat panels. A balustrade runs above the third story. In the center three bays, the balustrade contains an ornamented parapet with putti and urns.

Facing south on 57th Street, the limestone base is eight bays wide. The westernmost bay, closest to Park Avenue, contains a rectangular doorway with an elaborate stone entablature at ground level. To the east are three rectangular storefronts alternating with three double-height round-arched openings. The seventh bay from the west, a round arched opening, is a service entrance with a suspended awning; it was originally an alternate entrance to the interior. The eighth bay, the easternmost, contains a rectangular service entrance. Similarly to on Park Avenue, the third floor windows are largely grouped in pairs, though three of the outer bays are single windows. There are three cartouches on the third story, which correspond to the arched window openings below. A stone band with a cornice, atop the third story, is a continuation of the balustrade along Park Avenue.

==== Upper stories ====
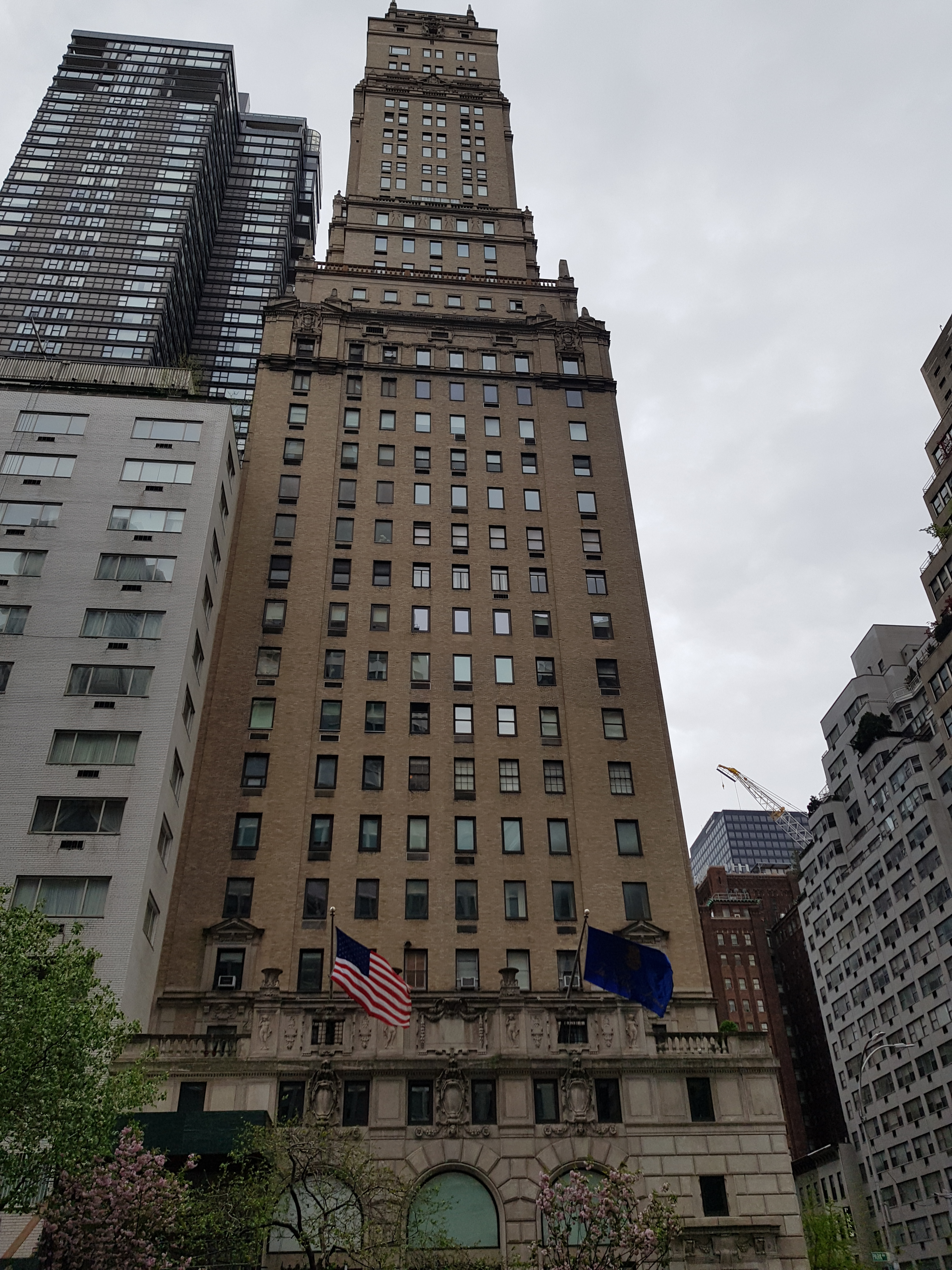
Seen from across Park Avenue (2019)

On Park Avenue, the fourth story is eight bays wide, with the two outermost bays projecting slightly from the rest of the facade. The fourth-story windows are surrounded by stone quoins, with a stone disk above each window, as well as a terracotta string course above the entire fourth story. The fifth through 17th story windows are largely identical to each other, consisting of rectangular openings, with air conditioning units underneath some windows. The exception is the two outermost bays on the fifth floor, which are each flanked by stone pilasters and surmounted by a pediment. The south and north facades are very similar to the Park Avenue facade, except that both facades are twelve bays wide; the north facade adjoins a 15-story building. The east facade is also similar, but with nine bays, and adjoins a six-story building. On all four sides, a terracotta string course runs above the 17th story.

At the double-height 18th story, all four facades are similar to each other, aside from the number of bays. On each facade, the outermost bays are flanked by brick piers, and they contain broken pediments with cartouches at their centers. The center bays on each side consist of rectangular windows, above which is a continuous lintel and several rectangular terracotta ventilation openings. Above the 18th story is a balustraded cornice with obelisks. The 19th story is set back on all sides and has rectangular windows topped by a lintel. The 20th story has rectangular windows with their own sills, and it is surmounted by a balustraded cornice with obelisks. The 21st through 24th stories are similar to each other, but with a string course and stone band above the 24th story. The north and south facades are wider on these respective stories than the west and east facades. (Note: The 19th and 20th floors each contain six windows on the west facade, eight windows on the east facade, and ten windows on the north and south facades. The 21st through 24th floors each contain five windows on the west and east facades, and they have seven windows on the north and south facades.)

The 25th through 32nd stories are plain brick and are topped by a string course and balustrade. (Note: The 25th through 32nd stories contain five bays on the north and south; the center three bays contain two windows while the outer two bays contain one window. These stories contain three bays on the west and east, each with two windows per floor. Above the 32nd story, the tower has three bays on all sides, each with two windows per floor.) On the 33rd and 34th floors, the window bays are separated vertically by pilasters and horizontally by recessed spandrels. A string course, balustrade, and central pediment runs above the 34th story. The windows on the 35th story are connected by lintels and topped by a string course. The 36th and 37th stories contain plain openings. On the 38th story, there are three windows on all sides, with the center window on each side being ornately decorated. There is a partial hip roof above the 38th story, surmounted by a square tower with rounded corners. The 39th story has one window on each side while the 40th story has three small openings on each side. Above this is the hipped copper roof of the square tower, with finials at the corners and a limestone lantern and a pinnacle at the center. The pinnacle initially had a gold ball atop it, and the corners also had smaller obelisks with gold balls.

=== Features ===
The Ritz Tower was legally classified as a hotel to circumvent zoning restrictions that prevented new apartment buildings from being taller than 150 percent of the width of the adjacent street. The building did not have individual kitchens, as the lack of kitchens allowed Brisbane to claim it was legally a hotel. The Ritz Tower instead had five dumbwaiters, which were electrically heated and allowed for a dining service on every floor. The building contained three elevators as well. Two were for apartment hotel tenants, while Brisbane's apartment had its own elevator. Unlike in earlier developments, where residents could hire their own servants, staff worked for all tenants at the Ritz Tower on a cooperative basis.

==== Lower stories ====
The ground floor contained the elevator hall, main entrances, stores, a residents' restaurant and tearoom, and a banking office. The main hallway, designed as a "Roman promenade", led from 57th Street to the dining room and tearoom. The floor was clad in travertine stone while the ceiling featured colorful groin arches, atop which were large bronze lanterns. The main restaurant, which no longer exists, had tapestries and murals. For the ceiling, Willy Pogany decorated a set of murals that depicted various icons around a representation of the tower. The tearoom, leading off the main hallway and accessible through brass and wrought-iron gates, was meant to resemble a "Pompeian patio". The walls of the tearoom were decorated with landscapes, while the ceiling was meant to depict "a sunlit sky".

The cellar and basement levels had vaults, a grill room, a kitchen, and a barbershop. The kitchen served the hotel's three restaurants and the residential apartments. The grill room was split across two basement stories and had an "informal" decorative scheme with brass and wrought-iron steelwork and colorful tile work and plaster work. The second to fifth floors were used largely for transient guests, staff rooms, and administrative offices. Particularly, the second and third floors were used for maids' and servants' rooms, as well as individual vaults for each tenant.

==== Apartments ====
There were about 400 hotel rooms on the upper floors, subdivided into suites with one to five rooms. The interior used luxurious materials such as walls with wood paneling and floors with parquetry. Most apartments had between two and four rooms in a studio or duplex layout. The fourth through 18th floors (Note: According to Landmarks Preservation Commission 2002, p. 6, short-term tenants and staff rooms were on the second to fifth floors, with long-term residents on the sixth through 18th floors. According to Ruttenbaum 1986, pp. 106–107, staff rooms were on the second and third floors, and tenants were on the fourth through 18th floors. The short-term tenants were on the fourth and fifth floors.) each had apartments and a central kitchen with dumbwaiter and pantry access. A corridor led from the elevators to each suite, where an entrance foyer off the corridor led to a bathroom, living area, and pantry. Living rooms were usually 15 by 24 feet (4.6 by 7.3 m). Bedrooms were 13 by 17 feet (4.0 by 5.2 m) and all had their own small closets and bathrooms. Despite the lack of a kitchen, the apartments did have sinks, electric refrigerators, and cabinets, which were legal in apartment hotels.

The 19th and 20th floors of the building were taken up by an 11-room or 18-room duplex apartment designed for Arthur Brisbane. The Brisbane unit has four bedrooms and four bathrooms. The unit has a full kitchen and a servants' living area, features that were not present in any other individual suite, as well as a full terrace on the 19th-story setback. Brisbane was the only resident with his own domestic staff; they lived with him on the 20th floor rather than with the other servants on the second and third floors. The unit is accessed by an elevator leading to a marble entrance foyer. Brisbane's unit has a double-height living room (Note: According to Stern, Gilmartin & Mellins 1987, p. 213, Brisbane's residence had a 30-by-62-foot (9.1 by 18.9 m) living room with a 24-foot (7.3 m) ceiling. According to Ruttenbaum 1986, p. 107, the living room was only 20 feet (6.1 m) tall and 20 feet wide, but ran 70 feet (21 m) along Park Avenue.) decorated by Thomas Hastings, which measures 45 feet (14 m) long and is designed similarly to a Renaissance-era palazzo. There is a wood-burning fireplace, stained-glass doors and windows, and a ceiling from a Venetian palace. Next to the living room is an office–library, a media room, a bedroom, and a bathroom, while the laundry room, a dining room, and the kitchen are next to the opposite side of the living room. A semicircular, leaded-glass solarium leads from the dining room to the terrace. On the 20th floor, three balconies overlook the living room, including a Juliet balcony. The unit's other three bedrooms and bathrooms are located on the 20th floor as well.

The units above Brisbane's duplex each had one to four bedrooms, all with their own bathrooms. The 21st through 24th stories each contained two simplex apartments per floor; by the 1950s, these had been divided into four apartments per floor. Above the 25th floor were the building's "tower apartments". The 25th through 32nd stories each contained two duplex apartments, one for every pair of floors. Each duplex contained a double-height, 16-by-40-foot (4.9 by 12.2 m) living room with an entrance foyer on its lower level and a balcony on its upper level. There were also terraces at the corners of the tower. The 33rd to 37th stories each contained one apartment. The apartments on the 25th through 34th floors were divided into three units in the 1950s.

== History ==
During the early 19th century, apartment developments in the city were generally associated with the working class, but by the late 19th century, apartments were also becoming desirable among the middle and upper classes. Between 1880 and 1885, more than ninety apartment buildings were developed in the city. Apartment hotels in New York City became more popular after World War I, particularly among wealthy people who wanted to live luxuriously but also wanted to do some of their own housework, such as cooking. Developers of apartment hotels sometimes constructed developments to bypass the Tenement House Law, which prevented new apartment buildings from being taller than 150 percent of the width of the adjacent street. Apartment hotels had less stringent regulations on sunlight, ventilation, and emergency stairs but had to contain communal spaces like dining rooms. As a result, developers could provide up to 30 percent more space in an apartment hotel than in a conventional apartment building. (Note: For a 100-foot-wide (30 m) street such as 57th Street, an apartment hotel could rise 150 feet (46 m) before its first setback and required no rear courtyard; it could also cover up to 90 percent of its lot. A conventional apartment building could only rise 112.5 feet (34.3 m), with a backyard measuring 10 feet (3.0 m) deep, and could only cover at most 70 percent of its lot. Apartment buildings required one fire stair for every two families on a floor, but apartment hotels did not need to install a minimum number of fire stairs.)

The Ritz Tower was one such apartment hotel, developed by Arthur Brisbane, a prominent columnist for Hearst Communications during the early 1920s. He worked under newspaper publisher William Randolph Hearst starting in 1897, and the two men later became close friends. Brisbane developed several buildings in New York City starting in the early 20th century, having been inspired by Hearst's precedent. While the men developed several projects together, only Brisbane was involved in the Ritz Tower's construction. When the Ritz Tower was being proposed, there were few high-rise residential buildings in Manhattan. When planning for the Ritz Tower started in 1924, the tallest residential building that had been proposed in Manhattan was 28 stories high.

=== Development ===
==== Site acquisition and planning ====
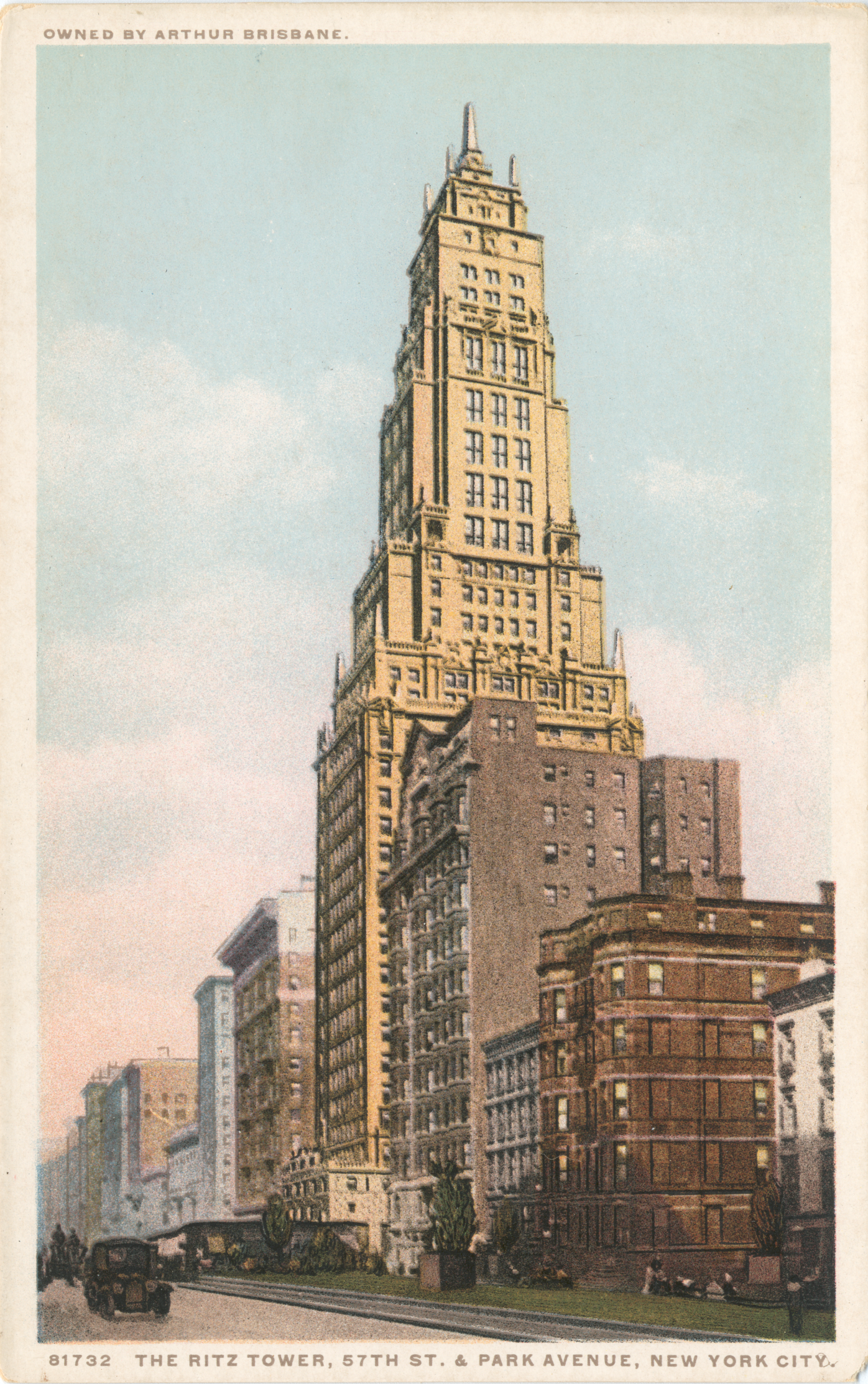
Sketch of the Ritz Tower

In March 1920, Brisbane acquired the first land lot at the site of Ritz Tower from Henry Anderson. Within two months, he had purchased 103 and 105 East 57th Street, just east of Park Avenue. A representative of the Hearst corporations leased the corner lot from the Roome family in August 1922. Twelve months later, he bought two private houses at 107 and 109 East 57th Street. This gave him a site measuring 80 feet (24 m) on Park Avenue and 90 feet (27 m) on 57th Street. Brisbane acquired 111 and 113 East 57th Street in November 1924 in a roundabout transaction that involved the structure at 117 East 57th Street. This transaction rounded out Brisbane's frontage on 57th Street to 130 feet.

Brisbane hired Emery Roth to design an apartment hotel on the site in 1924. That September, Roth publicized plans for a residential structure at 465 Park Avenue, which would be taller than any other building north of 42nd Street. The plans called for a 30-story building with 358 rooms, 165 bathrooms, 135 kitchens, a restaurant, a bank, and art galleries and exhibition space. The apartment tower would have had 144 two- and three-room units on the third through 18th floors, as well as a setback at the 19th floor to serve as a terrace for Brisbane's duplex on the 19th and 20th floors. The 21st through 24th floors would have contained two- and three-room units; the 25th through 28th floors, duplex studios; the 29th floor, a duplex apartment; and the 30th floor, a penthouse apartment. The Diana sculpture from Madison Square Garden was to be placed on the roof.

At some point afterward, Thomas Hastings was hired for reasons that were not clearly publicized. Hastings was known for his designs of numerous classical buildings in New York City, such as the New York Public Library Main Branch and Henry Clay Frick House. He recommended that the Ritz Tower be designed in a classical style, a suggestion with which Roth agreed.

==== Construction ====
S. W. Straus & Co financed the construction of 465 Park Avenue with an issue of $4 million first mortgage gold bonds in November 1924. The same month, main contractor Todd and Robertson Engineering Corporation started demolishing existing buildings on the site. Roth filed building plans with the New York City Department of Buildings in January 1925, at which the building was projected to cost $2.4 million. The same month, the Ritz-Carlton Company signed a 21-year, $10 million operating lease, and it formed a subsidiary, the Ritz Tower Corporation, to manage the building under the name "Ritz Tower". The building was to operate as a residential hotel, with short-term suites as well as long-term units. At the time, the Ritz-Carlton name was so highly regarded that it was synonymous with luxury. In July 1925, Brisbane's Parkab Corporation leased the building to Ritz Tower Corporation for $1,000 a day. The general management of the building was contracted to the Brown Wheelock Harris Vought and Company's vice president, Duncan G. Harris.

By 1926, the plans had been changed, so the building would be the equivalent of 42 stories. That May, the news media reported that the building was nearly complete and was projected to cost $5–6 million, excluding furnishings. According to The New York Times, the Ritz Tower had "already attracted the attention of architects, artists and building engineers" across the United States. The New York Herald Tribune labeled it as the "tallest apartment hotel in the world". During that October, the city's tenement house commissioner Walter C. Martin issued an order that deemed about 150 "apartment hotels" citywide to be in violation of height restrictions, including the new Ritz Tower. According to Martin, the buildings were not exempt from the law because some units had their own pantries where people could cook on their own. The law was not changed until 1929, though this effectively eliminated any subsequent apartment hotels.

=== Opening and early years ===
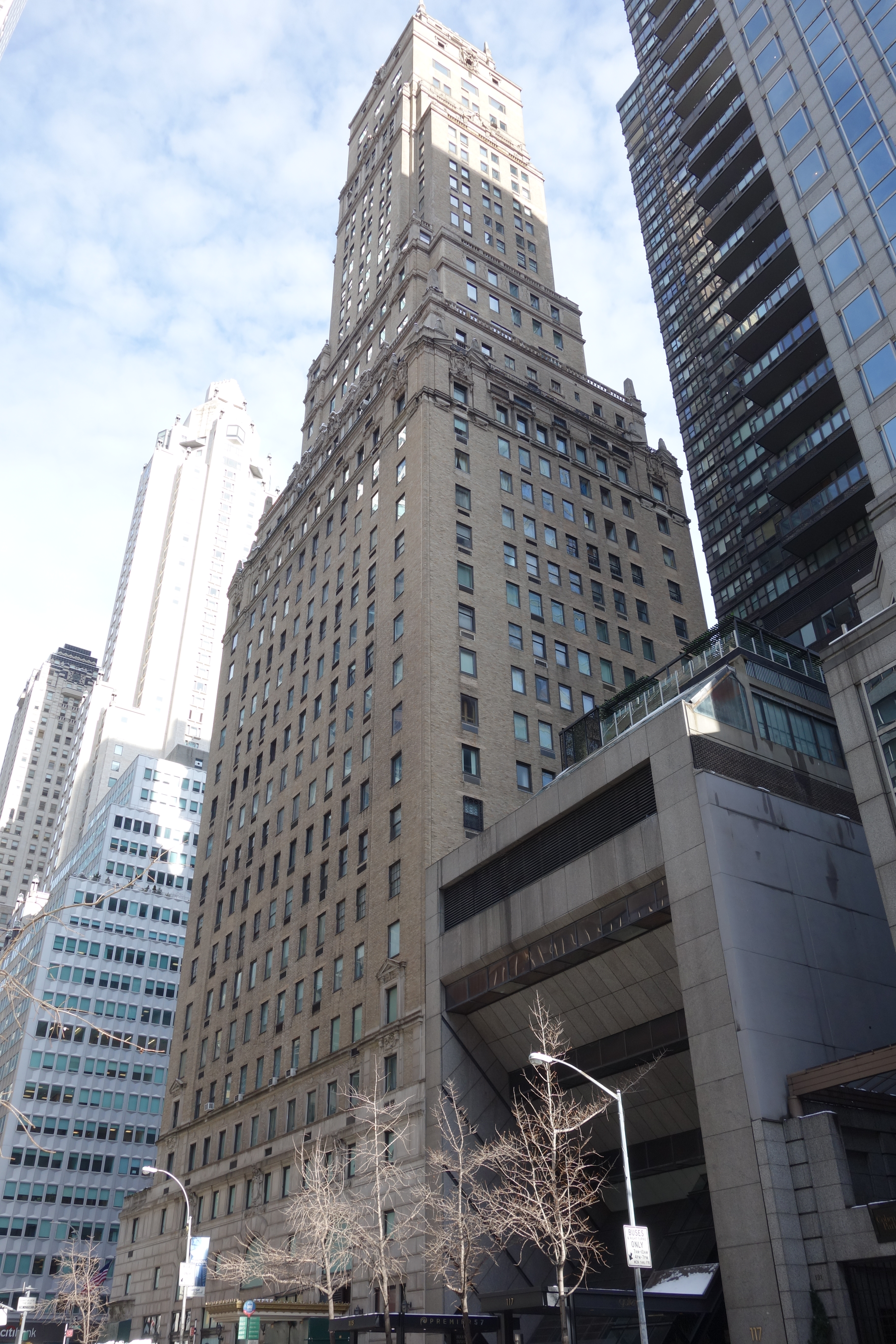
Looking west at the Ritz Tower from the south side of 57th Street west of Lexington Avenue

A formal opening dinner for the hotel was hosted on November 16, 1926. (Note: Landmarks Preservation Commission 2002, p. 6, cites the opening dinner as being on October 16, 1926. However, the text cites The New York Times November 16, 1926.) The guests at the hotel's opening included Harris; Jimmy Walker, the city's mayor; Joseph V. McKee, president of the New York City Board of Aldermen; and various prominent citizens and journalists. Brisbane quickly found that he was unable to manage the payments for the tower's mortgage loan. The Ritz Tower was valued at $6 million when it was completed; within a little more than a year, its appraised valuation increased by about $500,000. Brisbane sold the Ritz Tower to Hearst, his longtime colleague, in January 1928. The sale occurred in spite of the fact that Hearst's financial advisors had suggested against it.

When Hearst had bought the Ritz Tower, he also owned the lot directly to the north, which extended to 58th Street. In 1929, one year after purchasing the structure, Hearst filed plans for a 55-story annex on the adjacent lot, to be designed by F. M. Andrews and J. B. Peterkin if it had been built. Hearst took over the adjacent lot at 110 to 114 East 58th Street in 1931 for the proposed annex. The structure was never built and the site to the north was subsequently acquired by Alcoa. In early 1932, Hearst transferred ownership of the Ritz Tower from the Apperson Realty Corporation to the Park Fifty-seventh Realty Corporation, both of which were under his control. A fire broke out in the tower's basement on August 1, 1932, causing an explosion that killed eight firemen. Seven died immediately, while one died later at the hospital. A Chrysler automobile salon opened at the base of the tower in 1937.

By the mid-1930s, Hearst was operating the Ritz Tower at a net loss, with a deficit of about $592,000 in 1935 and $458,000 in 1936. Concurrently, his own media ventures were losing large amounts of money, leading Hearst to place the building for sale. Hearst forfeited ownership of the building in April 1938 after failing to make payments on the first mortgage loan, and he moved to California from his home in the Ritz Tower. The interior furnishings remained under Hearst ownership, but operations passed to the trustee, the Continental Bank and Trust Company. Shortly afterward, a group called 103 East Fifty-seventh Street Inc. was created to operate the Ritz Tower. The operators filed documents with the New York Supreme Court in December 1938, in which they proposed that the bondholders take over ownership.

Continental Bank and Trust bought the majority of the Ritz Tower at a foreclosure auction in January 1940, excluding the portion of the base on Park Avenue. The reorganization proceedings concluded the next month. A new corporation, New York Towers Inc., acquired the Ritz Tower and issued ownership shares to bondholders. In 1945, the New England Mutual Life Insurance Company placed a ten-year, $1.07 million mortgage loan on the building. A.M. "Sonny" Sonnabend bought the rights to manage the Ritz Tower in 1952 for $17 million.

=== Cooperative conversion ===
In February 1955, Harry J. Riker of Riker & Co. announced the building would be converted to a housing cooperative. As part of this plan, the interior would be redecorated by Dorothy Draper. A group of tenants challenged this proposal in the New York Supreme Court. By that October, the building's lobby had been completely redesigned with mixed Chinese and French motifs, and the corridors of the upper stories were being redesigned as well. The building was converted to a cooperative in December 1955. Of the 150 tenants at the time of the cooperative conversion, 35 declined to join the cooperative. Ritz Associates Inc., the tenant cooperative, formally took ownership of the building in February 1956. The Ritz Tower provided maid service and room service for its cooperative tenants.

The Ritz Tower's units were sold at rates ranging from $7,200 for a single room to $43,200 for five rooms. Most of the cooperative units were two-bedroom apartments with four total rooms. There were also studio units and one- to three- bedroom apartments with a varying number of rooms. The old 19th and 20th story duplex was retained as one unit. The Ritz Tower was one of several New York City apartment hotels that had converted to cooperative operation in the mid-20th century. Le Pavillon, one of the first authentic French restaurants in the U.S., moved to the Ritz Tower from 55th Street in 1957, after the renovation was completed. The New York Savings Bank placed a ten-year, $2.74 million mortgage on the building in September 1958. The New York Bridge Whist Club and the Cavendish Club, two contract bridge clubs, were among the groups housed in the Ritz Tower at this time.

=== Late 20th century to present ===
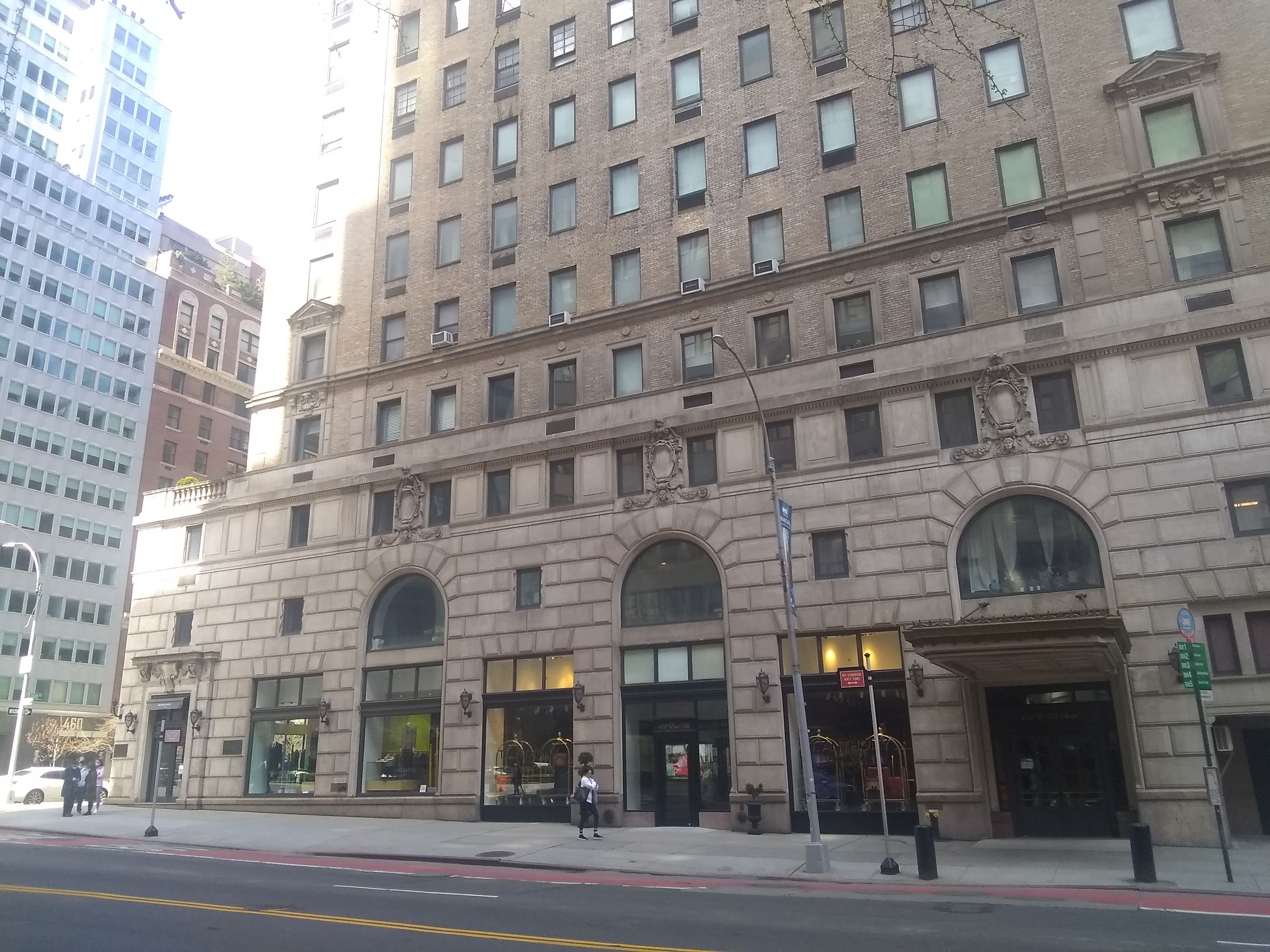
The building's commercial base, as seen in April 2021

Le Pavillon operated within the Ritz Tower until 1972. The restaurant's Ritz Tower location had been less popular than its 55th Street location because of the difficulty of dropping off and picking up passengers at such a congested area. In 1975, the basement space was taken by the First Women's Bank, the first bank in the United States to be operated by women for female patrons. The bank branch operated within the former Le Pavillon space. The year afterward, Japanese department store Mitsukoshi opened a New York City office, with a restaurant and boutique shop at the Ritz Tower's base. The company initially leased 10,000 square feet (930 m^{2}) from the Ritz Tower.

By 1980, the Ritz Tower contained 136 co-op units and several short-term units. Brisbane's old duplex was occupied by Mitsukoshi president Shigeru Okada. The other units ranged from between $17,000 and $20,000 for a studio apartment to $100,000 for a penthouse. During that decade, Paul Goldberger described the building as "the ideal pied-à-terre building in New York". The Ritz Tower stopped allowing short-term rentals in 1987. Within the same time period, Henry Hart Rice bought the corner lot along Park Avenue.

Mitsukoshi closed its boutique and restaurant at the base in 1991, and the bank at the building's base moved out the same year. With these closures, Mitsukoshi announced plans to open a department store across the building's lowest four stories during 1993. Ownership of the Ritz Tower was split into two condominiums. Mitsukoshi bought one condominium, consisting of 40,000 square feet (3,700 m^{2}) within the basement and most of the lowest three stories, for $17.25 million. The residents' cooperative took over the other condominium, consisting of two cellars, the residents' lobby, and all residential stories. The following year, with the early 1990s recession, Mitsukoshi indefinitely postponed its plans to open a department store in the base. Borders leased the retail condominium unit in early 1997 and opened a bookstore there the same year.

The New York City Landmarks Preservation Commission designated the building as a city landmark on October 29, 2002. The same year, Borders was looking to close its bookstore at the building, as its other Manhattan location at the World Trade Center had been destroyed in the September 11, 2001, attacks. Ultimately Borders remained in the space until 2011. Businessman Charles S. Cohen bought the retail condominium for $22 million in 2009, but after Borders' closure, was unable to lease the space until 2017, when fashion retailer Richard James and shoe store Harrys of London occupied the space. During the early 21st century, the roof was renovated to plans by Howard L. Zimmerman Architects. In late 2020, luggage retailer T. Anthony leased space in one of the 57th Street storefronts.

== Notable guests and residents ==
Upon the Ritz Tower's completion, Brisbane was one of the first tenants in his own building. After Hearst bought the building from Brisbane, he lived in a suite with actress Marion Davies until Hearst forfeited ownership in 1938. Other early tenants included Arthur G. Hoffman, vice president of The Great Atlantic & Pacific Tea Company, as well as Edward E. Spafford, the national commander of the American Legion. In the building's early years, the restaurant and other ground-floor spaces were used for events and entertainment. These included fundraisers; dinners for foreign guests, including the Duke and Duchess of Sutherland; and art shows.

The Ritz Tower was particularly popular as a residence for those in the media. The building's tenants have included actresses Greta Garbo, Kitty Carlisle, Paulette Goddard, Deborah Kerr, and Arlene Francis, as well as Francis's husband, actor Martin Gabel. William Randolph Hearst Jr., the son of the publisher, also had a suite in the building. Other tenants have included music producer Clive Davis; radio comedian Goodman Ace; English author Elinor Glyn; TV producer Norman Lear, the creator of All in the Family; and William Hays, the head of the "Hays Office" which censored Hollywood movies. Playwright Neil Simon also occupied the Ritz Tower from the 1980s until he died in 2018; he had vowed to live in the building after visiting Ace's apartment, eventually combining three of the apartments.

The Ritz Tower has been home to non-media tenants as well. George Gustav Heye, who founded the Museum of the American Indian, lived in the Ritz Tower until his 1957 death. Additionally, Charles S. Cohen combined six of the apartments when he lived there, including two apartments owned by the oil magnate Warren Alpert.

== Reception ==
Robert A. M. Stern wrote in his 1987 book New York 1930 that Roth's original design had an "ingenious" organization, but that "the massing was clumsy, with abrupt setback transitions. More important, the articulation of the facade was conventional and the building lacked not only a consistent image but a distinct sense of verticality." Eric Nash wrote that Roth "seems to have done everything in his power to disguise the building's height", which resulted in a design that was "easy to find fault with". One architect, Arthur T. North, ridiculed the Ritz Tower as a "sky-puncture" because of the design of its upper section. North wrote: "It would have been a pretty good building up to and including the eighteenth floor; in fact it would have been quite pleasing. The top works, however, appear to be rather incoherent." Roth regarded North's criticism in particular as unwarranted, saying that he used the Renaissance style due to its "domestic" character.

Other critics praised the detail, as well as the tower's impact on the development of residential apartments. Will Irwin wrote that the building was "a genuine tower building as comely as any in Manhattan" and suggested that visitors would "lose the sense of exclusiveness and exclusion" while looking at the building. Another critic wrote: "Its easy proportionate narrowings bear spikes and fleches; it leaps upward like a flame." In a book published in 1932, W. Parker Chase wrote that the building was "'just a little bit of Paris' fitted into the American setting of magnificent Park Avenue". According to Fiske Kimball, structures such as the Ritz Tower "have emboldened imagination to conceive a city with lance-like towers set in open plots of greenery". Georgia O'Keeffe also depicted the building in her 1920s painting Ritz Tower, Night.

The building continued to be critically appraised in later years. Elizabeth Hawes wrote that the Ritz Tower's construction "changed the direction of residential architecture" with its vertical emphasis. Carter Horsley described the building as having a "somewhat odd" setback on Park Avenue, although the building was "still very impressive" despite being overshadowed by taller structures in the area. In 1986, Steven Ruttenbaum wrote that the Ritz Tower was not "just an exemplary building from the golden age of New York apartment-houses; it was a prestigious apartment hotel, the symbol of an elegant and conservative life-style that came of age just before the Great Crash".

== See also ==
- List of New York City Designated Landmarks in Manhattan from 14th to 59th Streets
