= 57th Street (Manhattan) =

West-east street in Manhattan, New York

Coordinates: 40.7649°N 73.9787°W

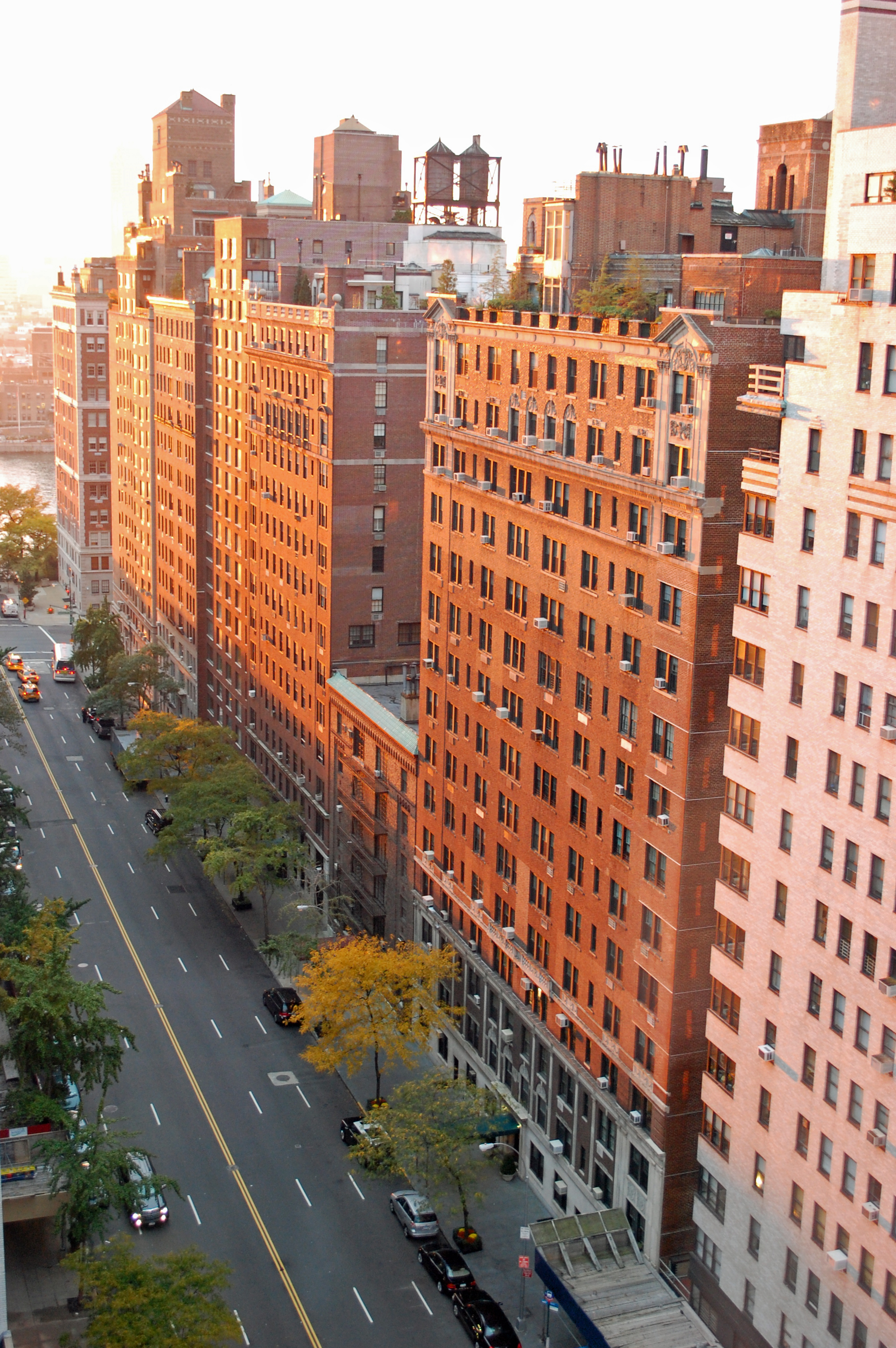
- Apartment buildings lining East 57th Street between First Avenue and Sutton Place
- Interactive map of 57th Street
- Location: Midtown Manhattan, New York City
- West end: NY 9A / West Side Highway
- East end: York Avenue / Sutton Place

57th Street is a broad thoroughfare in the New York City borough of Manhattan, one of the major two-way, east-west streets in the borough's grid. As with Manhattan's other "crosstown" streets, it is divided into its east and west sections at Fifth Avenue. The street runs from a small park overlooking the East River in the east to the West Side Highway along the Hudson River in the west. 57th Street passes through the Midtown Manhattan neighborhoods of Sutton Place, Billionaire's Row, and Hell's Kitchen from east to west.

57th Street was created according to the Commissioners' Plan of 1811 and was developed as a mainly residential street in the mid-19th century. The central portion of 57th Street was developed as an artistic hub starting in the 1890s, with the development of Carnegie Hall. The section between Fifth and Eighth Avenues is two blocks south of Central Park. Since the early 21st century, the portion of the street south of Central Park has formed part of Billionaires' Row, which contains luxury residential skyscrapers such as 111 West 57th Street, One57, and Central Park Tower.

== Route description ==
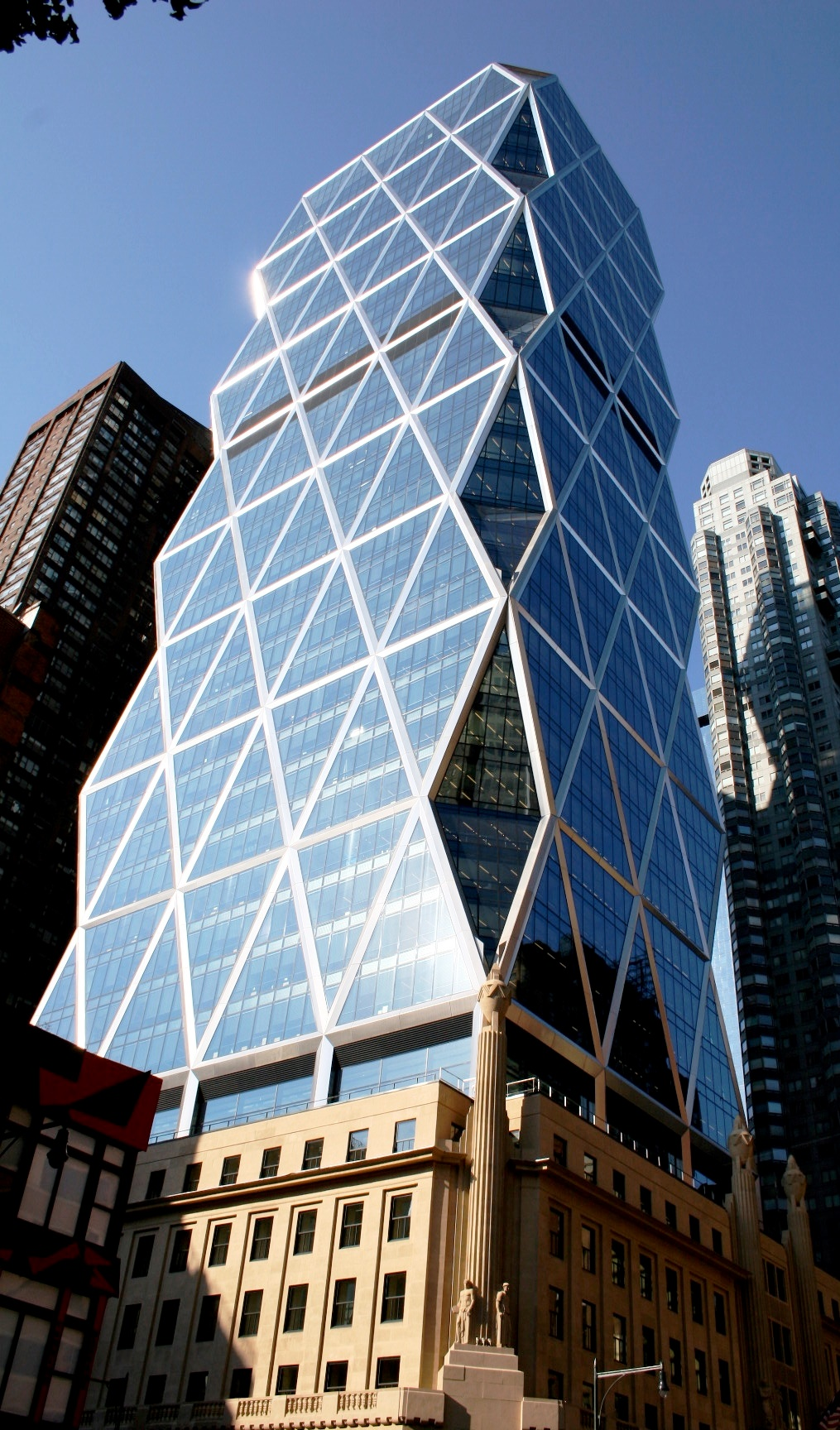
The Hearst Tower at 300 West 57th Street

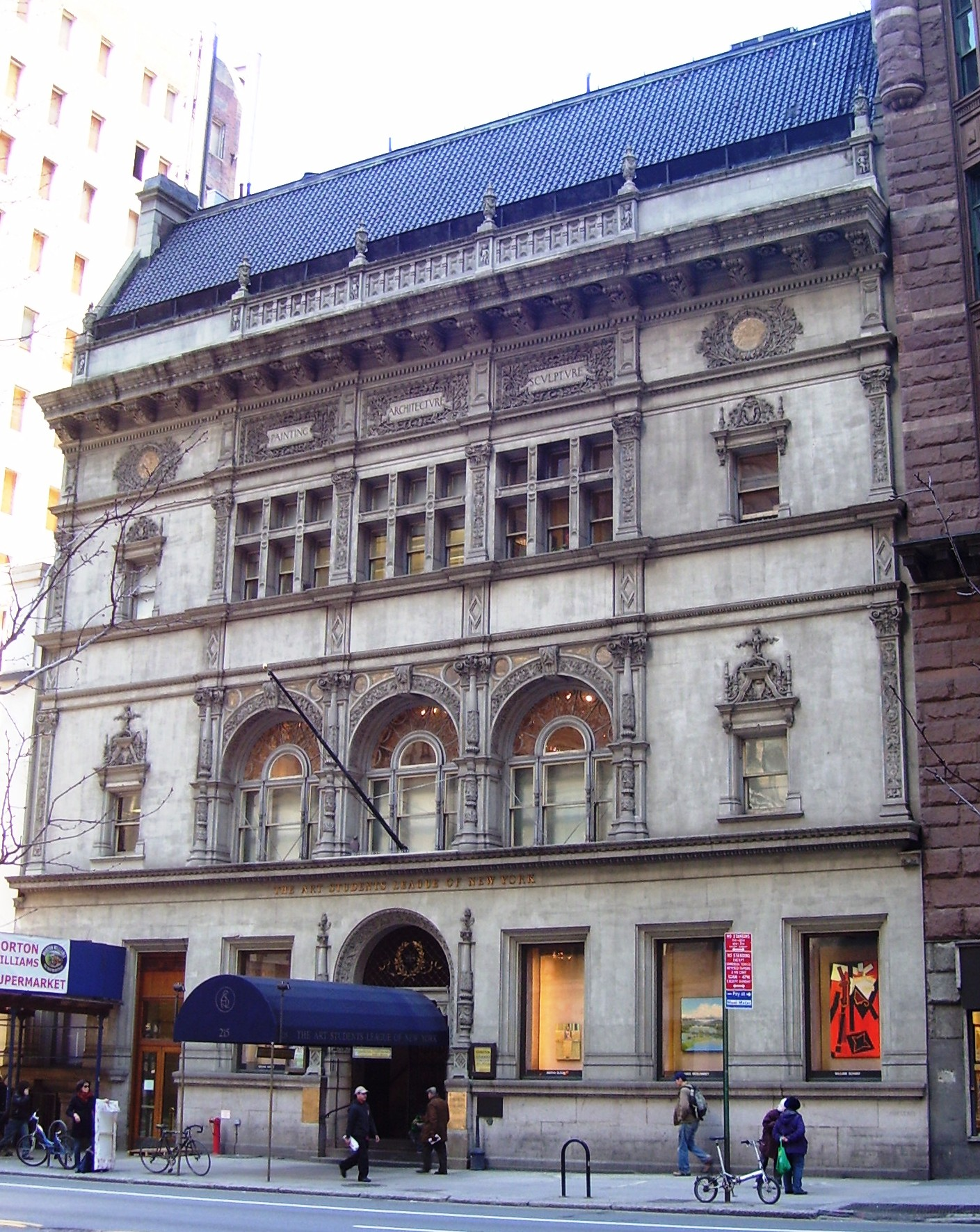
Art Students League at 215 West 57th Street

Over its two-mile (3 km) length, 57th Street passes through several distinct neighborhoods with differing mixes of commercial, retail, and residential uses. 57th Street is notable for prestigious art galleries, restaurants and up-market shops.

The first block of 57th Street, at its western end at Twelfth Avenue near the Hudson River waterfront, is home to the VIA 57 West building, designed in the form of a triangular pyramid by Danish architect Bjarke Ingels. From there to Tenth Avenue are low-rise industrial properties, several automobile dealerships, and small-scale residential buildings. Much of the south side of the block between Eleventh and Tenth Avenues is occupied by the CBS Broadcast Center, which is the network's primary East Coast production facility. The street's name was used by CBS to title a newsmagazine program produced by the network in the late 1980s, West 57th.

From Tenth Avenue to Eighth Avenue, larger residential buildings appear. Beginning at Eighth Avenue and continuing east through the core of Midtown Manhattan, the street is dominated by very large commercial and residential towers, such as at the Hearst Tower at the southwest corner of 57th Street and Eighth Avenue. This stretch of 57th Street is home to several large hotels such as Le Parker Meridien and well-known restaurants such as the Russian Tea Room (both between Seventh Avenue and Sixth Avenue), and to the offices of several magazines including The Economist. The corner of 57th Street and Seventh Avenue is home to the city-owned performance venue Carnegie Hall.

The mid-block between Seventh and Sixth Avenues is a terminus of a north-south pedestrian avenue named Sixth and a Half Avenue.

East of Sixth Avenue, the street is home to numerous high-end retail establishments including the Tiffany & Co. flagship store and the Bergdorf Goodman Building. The stores located at 57th Street's intersections with Fifth and Madison Avenues occupy some of the most expensive real estate in the world.

Commercial and retail buildings continue to dominate until Third Avenue, where the street rapidly returns to a preponderance of large residential buildings. As it continues from here through its final blocks leading to its terminus at Sutton Place, the street consists of a nearly unbroken stretch of increasingly upscale apartment buildings with doormen, awnings, and small commercial establishments such as drug stores, bank branches, and restaurants.

57th Street ends at a small city park overlooking the East River just east of Sutton Place.

== History ==
The street was designated by the Commissioners' Plan of 1811 that established the Manhattan street grid as one of 15 east-west streets that would be 100 feet (30 m) in width (while other streets were designated as 60 feet (18 m) in width). Throughout its history, 57th Street has contained high-end housing and retail, as well as artistic uses.

=== Early development ===
57th Street was laid out and opened in 1857. In the early 19th century, there were industrial concerns clustered around either end of 57th Street, near the Hudson and East Rivers. At the time, the surrounding areas were largely undeveloped except for Central Park two blocks to the north. As late as the 1860s, the area east of Central Park was a shantytown with up to 5,000 squatters. The block of the street between Fifth and Sixth Avenues was still mostly undeveloped and noted for its boulders and deep ravines where squatters lived in shanties.

The block between Fifth and Madison Avenues was the first part of 57th Street to see development, when Mary Mason Jones built the "Marble Row" on the eastern side of Fifth Avenue from 57th to 58th Streets between 1868 and 1870. In the mid-1870s, wealthy New Yorkers began to put up large family residences on the block to the west. William B. Bishop, a banker and stockbroker, built one of the first, a brownstone at number 10. An 1876 directory gives addresses on the block for bankers John Ellis and John S. Kennedy; merchants John Auchincloss, Richard R. Haines, Caleb Marsh, and James Talcot; importer Sigmund Housman; lawyers Frederick W. Stevens and Stephen Benton Elkins; manufacturer Henry T. Sloane; and politicians Edwin Einstein and Samuel B. H. Vance. At that time, the block's best-known residents were two branches of the Roosevelt family, one headed by James A. Roosevelt and the other by Theodore Roosevelt Sr., President Theodore Roosevelt's father. A directory of 1881 adds the names of other prominent citizens including merchant Augustus D. Juilliard, financier William Bayard Cutting, and banker Jacob Schiff.

The intersection of 57th Street and Fifth Avenue was further developed in 1879 with the construction of the Cornelius Vanderbilt II House at the northwest corner. The block of West 57th Street between Fifth and Sixth Avenues was described as being "the very best in the city" by 1885. One contemporary observer described the block's family homes as "first-class dwelling houses". Another called them "the brown-stone mansions of rich brewers, the François Premier chateaux of bankers, the Gothic palaces of railroad kings". The area to the west contained townhouses, some of which were known as New York City's "choicest" residences. On East 57th Street, there were homes interspersed with structures built for the arts.

=== Arts hub ===
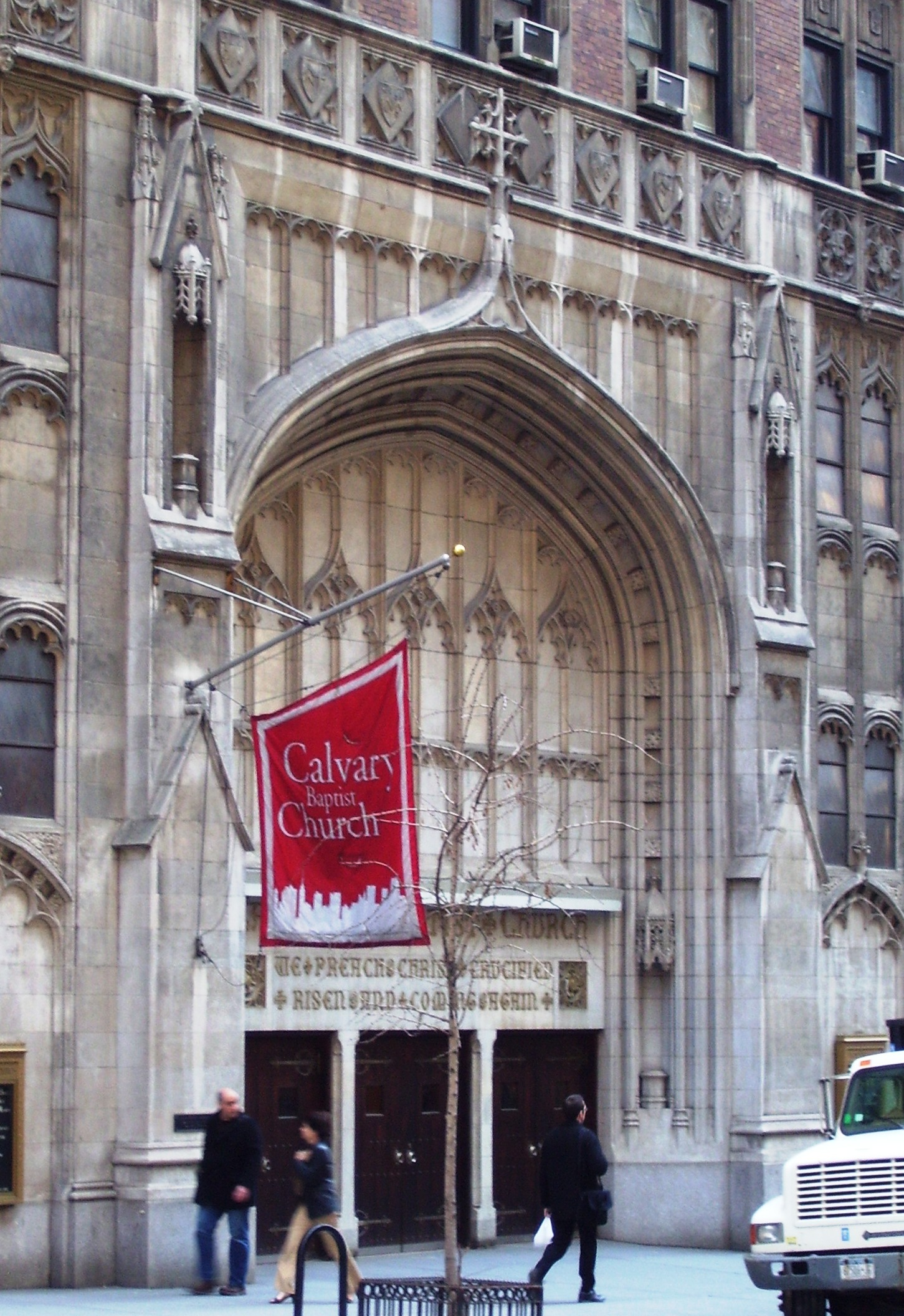
Calvary Baptist Church entrance at 123 West 57th Street

An artistic hub developed around the two blocks of West 57th Street from Sixth Avenue to Broadway during the late 19th and early 20th centuries, following the opening of Carnegie Hall in 1891. Artists' studio apartments, such as the Rembrandt at 152 West 57th Street and the Sherwood Studios at 58 West 57th Street, both since demolished, were developed on the south side of the street to take advantage of light from the north, while the Osborne Apartments were built diagonally across Carnegie Hall to provide soundproof residences for musicians. On the south side of the street, other artists' studio apartments were erected in the early 20th century, such as 130 West 57th Street, 140 West 57th Street, and Rodin Studios. West 57th Street also served as the headquarters of organizations such as the Lotos Club, Architectural League of New York, Art Students League of New York, Louis H. Chalif Normal School of Dancing at 165 West 57th Street, and Society of American Artists.

Following World War I, the block of 57th Street between Fifth and Sixth Avenues transitioned from residential to commercial as speculators bought and transformed the block's mansions into upscale retail establishments. A real estate specialist was quoted in 1922 as saying 57th Street was "the greatest street in New York". As the transformation to fashionable shopping district proceeded, reporters began referring to the block as "Rue de la Paix of New York" or "the Rue de la Paix of America". Furthermore, after about 1921, art galleries started to supplant residences on 57th Street, and other art galleries developed on the street in general. For instance, the Fuller Building at 41 East 57th Street has traditionally contained many galleries since its completion in 1929. During the early 20th century, many of the original townhouses on East 57th Street were rebuilt as art galleries. Interior decorators also moved to the area, converting existing houses or erecting new structures such as the Todhunter Building at 119 East 57th Street.

During the mid-1920s, two major piano showrooms, Chickering Hall and Steinway Hall, were developed on West 57th Street, as was the Russian Tea Room. Other commercial tenants started moving onto 57th Street, including Henri Bendel in 1912, Bergdorf Goodman in 1928, Bonwit Teller in 1930, FAO Schwarz in 1931, and Tiffany & Co. in 1940. Furthermore, the Hearst Magazine Building was constructed at Eighth Avenue and 57th Street between 1927 and 1928, while a skyscraper for the Calvary Baptist Church was erected at 123 West 57th Street between 1929 and 1930. On East 57th Street, several luxury apartment buildings were also developed.

=== Billionaires' Row ===
Starting in the 2010s, several very tall ultra-luxury residential buildings have been constructed or proposed on the stretch of West 57th Street between Eighth and Park Avenues, which is largely within two blocks of Central Park. The first of these was One57, a 1,004-foot (306 m) apartment building between Sixth and Seventh Avenues, which was completed in 2014. Due to the often record-breaking prices that have been set for the apartments in these buildings, the press has dubbed this section of 57th Street as "Billionaires' Row". These projects have generated controversy concerning the economic conditions and zoning policies that have encouraged these buildings, as well as the impact these towers will have on the surrounding neighborhoods and the shadows they will cast on Central Park.

== Transportation ==
The 57th Street station on the New York City Subway's IND Sixth Avenue Line is located at the intersection of 57th Street and Sixth Avenue and is served by the F and M trains. The 57th Street – Seventh Avenue station on the BMT Broadway Line is located at 57th Street and Seventh Avenue, served by the N, Q, R, and W trains.

The following bus routes serve 57th Street:

- The M57 and M31 share a crosstown corridor between 11th and 1st Avenues. The M57 extends up the West Side to the 72nd Street subway station, with eastbound service extended to Sutton Place. The M31 extends up the East Side to 92nd Street and 1st Avenue via York Avenue, with eastbound service originating at 10th Avenue.
- Additional service is provided by the M12 from 12th to 8th Avenues eastbound, and from Broadway to 11th Avenue westbound.
- The M10 uses 57th Street out of service from Broadway to 8th Avenue before starting uptown service.
- Several express buses from Brooklyn, Queens, and Staten Island serve 57th Street as well.

== Notable places ==
- 303 East 57th Street. At one point the "largest residential building in New York City", 47 floors.
- 300 East 57th Street
- 135 East 57th Street
- The Galleria, 115 East 57th Street. Eric Clapton's son fell from the building back in 1991.
- Ritz Tower, NE corner of Park Avenue, a New York City designated landmark
- Four Seasons Hotel New York, 57 East 57th Street
- Fuller Building, NE corner of Madison Avenue, a New York City designated landmark
- 590 Madison Avenue
- LVMH Tower
- L. P. Hollander Company Building, 3 East 57th Street, a New York City designated landmark
- Bergdorf Goodman Building, NW corner of Fifth Avenue, a New York City designated landmark
- Formerly: site of Theodore Roosevelt's home in the 1870s and 1880s, 6 West 57th Street
- Solow Building, 9 West 57th Street
- Formerly: Sherwood Studios Building, SE corner of Sixth Avenue
- The Quin
- 111 West 57th Street, a residential tower; incorporating the former Steinway Hall, a New York City designated landmark
- Le Parker Meridien
- 130 West 57th Street, a New York City designated landmark
- 140 West 57th Street, a New York City designated landmark
- Metropolitan Tower, 142 West 57th Street
- Russian Tea Room, 148 West 57th Street
- Carnegie Hall Tower, between Sixth and Seventh Avenues
- One57, 157 West 57th Street
- 165 West 57th Street, campus of the IESE Business School, a New York City designated landmark
- Carnegie Hall, SE corner Seventh Avenue, a New York City designated landmark
- The Briarcliffe, a former hotel at 171 West 57th Street
- Osborne Apartments, NW corner of Seventh Avenue, a New York City designated landmark
- Rodin Studios, SW corner of Seventh Avenue, a New York City designated landmark
- 215 West 57th Street between Seventh Avenue and Broadway, headquarters of the Art Students League of New York, a New York City designated landmark
- 220 West 57th Street between Seventh Avenue and Broadway, a New York City designated landmark
- 224 West 57th Street, SE corner of Broadway, a New York City designated landmark
- Central Park Tower, 225 West 57th Street
- Hearst Tower, SW corner of Eighth Avenue, a New York City designated landmark
- Windermere Apartments, SW corner of Ninth Avenue, a New York City designated landmark
- Catholic Apostolic Church, 417 West 57th Street, a New York City designated landmark
- CBS Broadcast Center, from Tenth to Eleventh Avenues
- VIA 57 West, 625 West 57th Street

== Retail tenants ==
The following stores can be found between Sixth Avenue and Park Avenue:

- Abercrombie & Fitch
- Bergdorf Goodman
- Brioni
- Burberry
- Bvlgari
- Chanel
- Coach
- Dior Homme
- Christian Dior
- Christian Lacroix
- Jacob & Co
- Miu Miu
- Montblanc
- Prada
- Rizzoli Bookstore
- Yves Saint Laurent
- Tiffany & Co.
- Tourneau
- Turnbull & Asser
- Van Cleef & Arpels
- Louis Vuitton
