= Emily Weiss =

American businesswoman

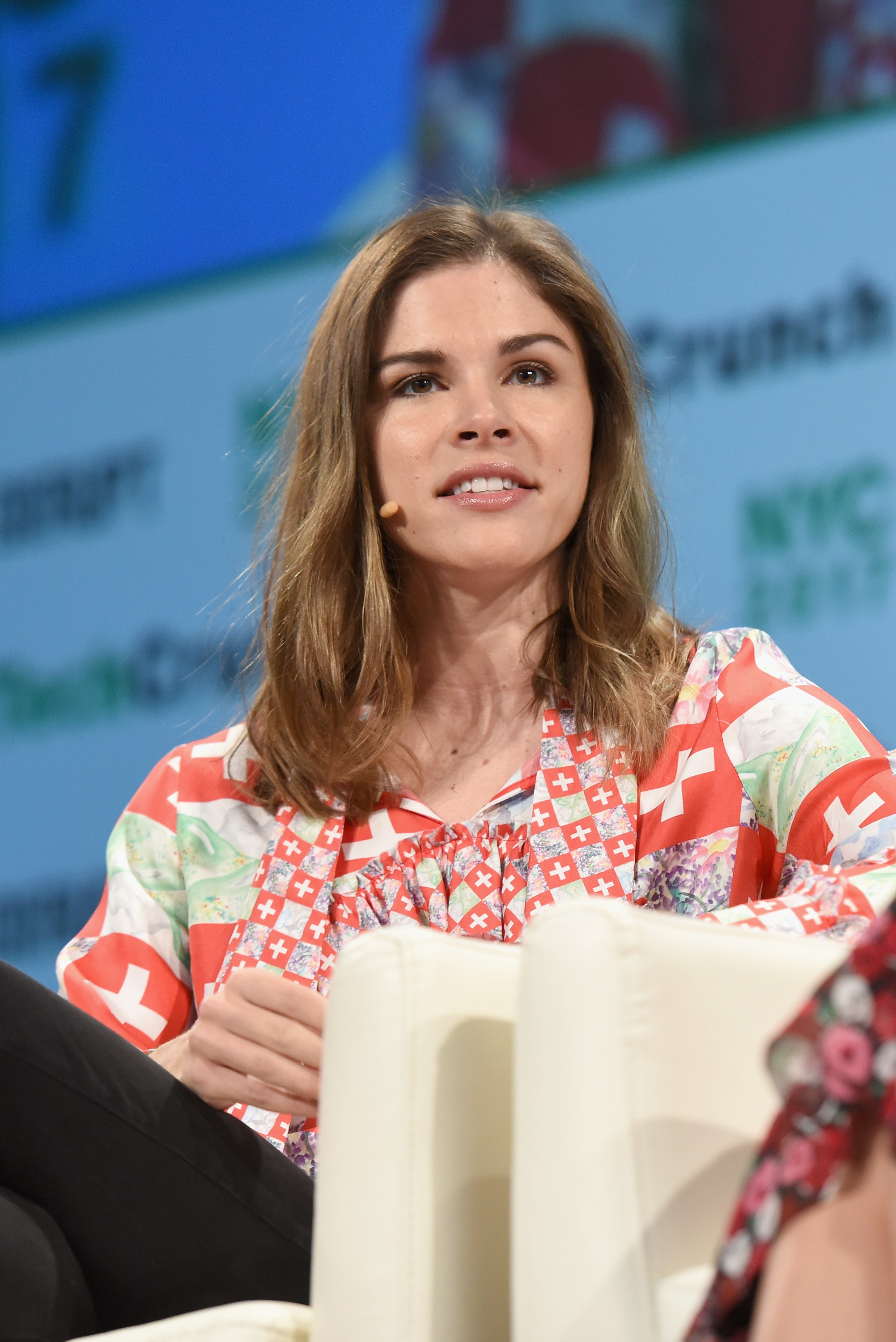
- Weiss in 2017
- Born: Emily Weiss; March 22, 1985 (age 41)
- Education: New York University
- Occupations: Founder, former CEO, and chairwoman of Glossier
- Partner: Will Gaybrick
- Children: 2

Emily Weiss (born March 22, 1985) is an American businesswoman. She is the founder and former CEO of the cosmetics company Glossier and the blog Into the Gloss. She was featured in a Forbes 30 Under 30 list in 2015. In 2019, she was included in Time magazine's "Next 100". In May 2022, she stepped down as Glossier’s CEO and became executive chairwoman, with Kyle Leahy taking over as CEO.

== Early life ==
Emily Weiss was raised in Wilton, Connecticut. Her father worked for Pitney Bowes and her mother stayed at home. In high school, Weiss interned at Ralph Lauren for two summers and briefly had a modeling career. While interning at Teen Vogue in college, she appeared on The Hills on a three-episode arc with Lauren Conrad and Whitney Port. Weiss graduated from New York University in 2007 with a degree in studio art. She was a fashion assistant at W magazine and an on-set styling assistant for Vogue where she assisted Elissa Santisi.

== Career ==
=== Into the Gloss ===
Weiss launched Into the Gloss, a blog featuring predominantly interviews with women, in September 2010. She stayed at her day job at Vogue and worked on Into the Gloss in the mornings between the hours of 4 a.m. and 8 a.m. A popular series on the blog is Top Shelf, where subjects are interviewed in their bathrooms and photos of their shelves and medicine cabinets are featured. Interviewees included Jenna Lyons and Karlie Kloss. By early 2012, the site had more than 200,000 unique visitors per month. By May 2016, the site had had 1.3 million visitors. After Weiss reached 10 million page views per month and acquired corporate partnerships for the site and a small staff, she quit her job at Vogue to focus on her own business.

=== Glossier ===
In 2014, Weiss started approaching venture capitalists with ideas for expansion, including a potential Into the Gloss-curated e-commerce platform. Weiss eventually raised $2 million in seed funding, with the help of venture capitalist Kirsten Green, the founder of San Francisco-based Forerunner Ventures. Weiss used this initial investment to hire a small team and launch Glossier.com.

In October 2014, Weiss introduced Glossier's first four products on her Into the Gloss blog and announced the launch of Glossier.com. According to Polina Marinova of Fortune, Weiss "quietly turned Glossier into one of the most disruptive brands in beauty." She initially pitched the company to 12 firms, with 11 not interested. In February 2018, Weiss released that Glossier had successfully raised an additional $52 million in a Series C round of funding. In March 2019, Weiss announced that Glossier had officially raised $100 million in a Series D round of funding and was valued at $1.2 billion.

In August 2020, Weiss and the company were accused of failing to support Black workers at the organization. In May 2022, Weiss stepped down as CEO of Glossier, but stayed on its board as executive chairwoman. Kyle Leahy, Glossier's former chief marketing officer, took over as CEO.

== Awards and recognition ==
- Featured in Forbes 30 Under 30 (2015).
- Included in Time Time 100 Next (2019).

== Personal life ==
In 2016, Weiss married photographer Diego Dueñas in the Bahamas. The union was short-lived.

In 2020, Weiss became engaged to Will Gaybrick, a senior executive at Stripe. The couple announced they were expecting a baby in June 2022. On June 29, Emily posted on her Instagram announcing the birth of her daughter, Clara Lion Weissbrick. On September 4, 2026, she posted on her Instagram announcing the birth of her daughter, Alba.
