= Patrick McCarthy (publisher) =

Patrick McCarthy (June 6, 1951 – February 24, 2019) was chairman and editorial director of W magazine and Women's Wear Daily (WWD).

Born in Dedham, Massachusetts, he graduated from Boston University as an undergraduate and from Stanford University's graduate journalism school in 1973 then began his career at Fairchild Publications at WWD in London. When Fairchild retired in 1997, he selected McCarthy as his successor in the roles of chairman and editorial director. McCarthy spent his entire professional life with the company, seeing it through its first acquisition by Disney and then its 1999 sale to Condé Nast.

McCarthy died on February 24, 2019, aged 67, following a short illness. He is survived by a sister and three nieces.

== Quotes ==
McCarthy told Michael Gross in a New York magazine cover article:

No one else could get the story, and if anyone else got the story, someone had to pay! You can't make The New York Times pay, so make the poor little designer pay — or the big rich designer. Mr. Fairchild instilled it in me. I'm like the abused child that is now abusing. I will kill for the story, and if I don't have it, I will get angry. A lot of the punishment meted out was for giving the story to someone else, which to us wasn't arbitrary.

When asked whether some punishments were arbitrary, McCarthy told Gross "Absolutely. Bite the hand that feeds you. Never stop biting it. And you know what? It will feed you more."
