= Bobbi Queen =

American fashion editor (1942–2026)

Barbara Sela Queen (February 22, 1942 – July 3, 2026), commonly known as Bobbi Queen, was an American fashion editor. She was the senior fashion editor at Women's Wear Daily.

== Life and career ==
Barbara Sela Queen was born on February 22, 1942, in Hollis, Queens, to Alvin and Beatrice (née Mallow) Queen. Her father was an insurance broker, and her mother was a schoolteacher. She grew up in Lakewood, New Jersey, and had two siblings. After attending Boston University for a year, Queen studied at the Tobé-Coburn School for Fashion Careers in Manhattan.

Queen began her career working as a buyer at Gimbels. In the 1970s, she began working at Women's Wear under publisher John Fairchild. Throughout her time with Women's Wear, she covered many changes in women's dress, particularly with the rise of second-wave feminism and more women entering the workforce. She covered the work of many notable designers, including Oscar de la Renta (1932–2014), Giorgio di Sant' Angelo (1933–1989), Perry Ellis (1940–1986), Norma Kamali (born 1945), Josie Natori (born 1947), Willi Smith (1948–1987), Donna Karan (born 1948), Vera Wang (born 1949), Ralph Rucci (born 1957), and Mark Badgley and James Mischka of Badgley Mischka. Queen retired in 2015.

Queen had a daughter. She died of a heart attack at her Manhattan home on July 3, 2026, at the age of 84.
