= Julian Levi =

Julian Levi may refer to:

- Julian E. Levi (1900–1982), American painter
- Julian Clarence Levi (1874–1971), American architect, painter, and philanthropist

== See also ==
- Julien Levy (1906–1981), art dealer and owner of Julien Levy Gallery in New York City
