= 1 William Street =

1 William Street may refer to:

- 1 William Street, Brisbane
- 1 William Street (New York City)
