= W (magazine) =

American fashion magazine

- Cover of the Summer 2026 issue, featuring Gisele Bündchen by Karim Sadli
- Editor-in-Chief: Sara Moonves
- Editor-at-Large: Lynn Hirschberg
- Categories: Fashion
- Frequency: Bimonthly (7x per year)
- Format: Oversized
- Total circulation: 455,443 (2025)
- Founder: John B. Fairchild
- First issue: April 1972; 54 years ago
- Company: Fairchild Fashion Media (1972–1999); Condé Nast (1999–2019); Future Media Group (2019–2020); W Media (2020–present)
- Country: United States
- Based in: One World Trade Center; New York, NY 10007; U.S.
- Language: English
- Website: wmagazine.com
- ISSN: 0162-9115
- OCLC: 1781845

W (stylized in all caps), also known as W Magazine, is an American bi-monthly fashion magazine that covers fashion, culture, entertainment, beauty, life, and travel. Since 2019, Sara Moonves has overseen the magazine's editorial content as editor-in-chief. John Fairchild, from 1972 was the first editor, remaining in the position until 1997 when Patrick McCarthy took over the role, Stefano Tonchi served as editor-in-chief from 2010 until Moonves appointment in 2019.

Based at One World Trade Center in the Financial District of New York City it began publication in 1972 as a bi-weekly supplement to the fashion trade newspaper, Women's Wear Daily. In 1993, the publication transitioned into a monthly magazine and was no longer a supplement to Women's Wear Daily.

W Korea launched in 2005 and is the oldest continuously operating international edition of W, W China launched in 2023 and is distributed across Mainland China. Youth culture-focused, WYouth launched in 2026.

== Background ==
W was launched in 1972. The magazine was published as a bi-weekly until 1993, when it was relaunched as an oversized publication published on a monthly schedule.

In 1999, Condé Nast purchased the magazine from Fairchild Publications. In 2019, it was sold to Surface Media (later renamed Future Media Group) and in 2020, it was sold to W Media which was created for the purchase. It now operates in partnership with Bustle Digital Group and Mic, along with a group of investors (led by Karlie Kloss).

The magazine is published every other month, alongside a summer special issue (seven times per year).

Average total circulation (United States and International)
Year	2018	2019	2021	2022	2023	2024	2025
Circulation	453,438	452,181	458,197	452,664	450,747	451,349	455,443

=== Editors ===
Editor-in-Chief (Note: Prior to 2010 the Editor-in-Chief role did not exist at the American publication.)	Start year	End year
John Fairchild	1972	1997
Patrick McCarthy	1997	2010
Stefano Tonchi	2010	2019
Sara Moonves	2019	present

== History ==
=== Origins of W, under Fairchild Fashion Media (1972–1999) ===
W Magazine origins lie as a biweekly newspaper, which was spun off from Women's Wear Daily, becoming an oversized monthly magazine published by Fairchild Fashion Media in 1993. When Fairchilds' owner (Capital Cities/ABC) merged with The Walt Disney Company in 1997, W was one of the publications the new company continued to publish.

=== Under Condé Nast (1999–2019) ===
W has garnered controversy over some of the featured models in its issues. Controversial cover shoots include Steven Meisel's "Asexual Revolution", in which male and female models (including Jessica Stam and Karen Elson) are depicted in gender-bending styles and provocative poses. In addition, Tom Ford's racy shoot with Klein and the accompanying article on sexuality in fashion came as a shock to some loyal readers. During the interview, Ford is quoted as saying: "I've always been about pansexuality. Whether I'm sleeping with girls or not at this point in my life, the clothes have often been androgynous, which is very much my standard of beauty". Klein was also the photographer for the racy photo shoot featured in the August 2007 issue, showcasing David and Victoria Beckham. Bruce Weber produced a 60-page tribute to New Orleans in the April 2008 issue, and shot a 36-page story on the newest fashion designers in Miami for the July 2008 issue.

In 2009, due to the 2008 Financial Crisis, advertising pages in the magazine were down 46 percent from 2008. Editor-in-Chief Patrick McCarthy retired in 2010 when Condé Nast moved W into its consumer magazine group, alongside Vogue, Glamour and Allure. Stefano Tonchi succeeded him as editor in chief. Edward Enninful was appointed fashion and style director in 2011. In 2011, W participated in a four-episode plot line on the fourth season of CW teen drama Gossip Girl.

Under Enninful's direction, W introduced riskier editorial features, including the March 2012 cover story by Steven Klein that depicted Kate Moss as a nun and Nicki Minaj portraying an 18th-century French courtesan.

Between 2013 and 2018, the magazine went from publishing twelve issues per year to eight. This would later be reduced to four in 2020, increased to six in 2021, and as of 2024, W publishes seven issues a year.

=== Under Future Media (2019–2020) ===
In 2018, W became one of three publications Condé Nast put up for sale in the face of significant financial losses that forced it to adopt a series of cost-cutting measures. By 2019, it was acquired by Future Media, in a deal the New York Post estimated at $7 million. In June 2019, Sara Moonves was named as the publications first female editor-in-chief, succeeding Stefano Tonchi.

Under Moonves's editorship, the magazine underwent a major transition. By 2020, she announced to staff that many were being furloughed and that those who work on online content would be staying on at reduced salaries. The new W team finished the biggest Best Performances issue ever. In the first week of January 2020, W launched nine covers, and a 76-page celebrity portfolio covering 29 celebrities and 20 videos. Additionally, the magazine launched a series of new initiatives and expanded its digital footprint. Launching W's first podcast, 5 Things with Lynn Hirschberg, which attracted included guests including Quentin Tarantino, Charlize Theron, Saoirse Ronan, Greta Gerwig, Noah Baumbach, Nicole Kidman, Awkwafina, and Margot Robbie as a part of the new vision for the brand.

=== Under W Media (2020–present) ===
On August 14, 2020, W was acquired by Bustle Digital Group, Mic, and W Media, a newly formed joint venture led by Karlie Kloss and including Aryeh Bourkoff, Jason Blum, Kaia Gerber, Kirsten Green and Lewis Hamilton. Moonves was retained as editor-in-chief.

== International editions ==
International editions were previously published in Japan and for Europe. The European edition launched in 1991 as W Fashion Life and separate versions were released in English, French, and Italian. In 1992 the magazine rebranded to W Fashion Europe. W Fashion Europe ceased publication in 1994.

The South Korean edition launched in 2005 and is published under license by Doosan Magazine. A Chinese edition was launched in 2023 under license by MC Style Media; the magazine's editor-in-chief is Mix Wei.

W Youth
- Editor-in-Chief: Sara Moonves
- Editor: Ava Nirui
- Categories: Youth culture
- Frequency: Bi-annual
- Founder: Sofia Coppola
- First issue: September 2026; 2 months ago
- Company: W Media (2026–present)
- Country: United States
- Based in: One World Trade Center; New York, NY 10007; U.S.
- Language: English
- Website: wmagazine.com/wyouth
- ISSN: 71453-40012

== W Youth ==
In 2025, Sofia Coppola contacted Ava Nirui encouraging her to propose the idea of "teen version" of W to Sara Moonves. W Youth (pronounced "Double Youth") launched in September 2026, Hailey and Justin Bieber featured on the cover of the inaugural issue. Nirui (previously of Marc Jacobs) was appointed editor. Sofia Coppola and her daughter, Cosima Croquet serve as contributing editors.

=== Editors ===
Country	Circulation dates	Editor-in-Chief	Start year	End year
United States (WYouth)	2026–present	Ava Nirui	2026	present

== Editors ==
List of editor-in-chiefs of all W editions:

Country	Circulation dates	Editor-in-Chief	Start year	End year	References
United States (W)	1972–present	John Fairchild	1972	1997	
United States (W)	1972–present	Patrick McCarthy	1997	2010	
United States (W)	1972–present	Stefano Tonchi	2010	2019	
United States (W)	1972–present	Sara Moonves	2019	present	
South Korea (W Korea)	2005–present	Hyejoo Lee	2005	present	
China (W China)	2023–present	Mix Wei	2023	present	

== See also ==
- List of W cover models
- List of W China cover models
- List of W Korea cover models
