= Yoko Devereaux =

Yoko Devereaux was a fashion house and menswear brand directed by Andy Salzer. It was located in Williamsburg, Brooklyn. Founded in 2000 it ceased operation in 2009.

== History ==
Yoko Devereaux emerged as an art installation focused on the use of t-shirts as a form of visual communication between fashion, art, music and commerce. Taking its direct inspiration from the street wear scene in Williamsburg, the label has grown into a full menswear collection that is known for mixing New York's downtown casual style with classic tailoring techniques. Yoko Devereaux was available worldwide including the United States, Japan, Canada, Hong Kong, and Western Europe.

Yoko Devereaux was a favorite of the fashion media from the very start, receiving editorial credits in GQ, Details, DNR, Dazed and Confused, Bon, Paper. Yoko Devereaux has been seen on Pharrell Williams, Josh Hartnett, Jonathan Rhys Meyers, Alan Cumming, the Scissor Sisters, The Brazilian Girls, The Rapture and other celebrities and musicians.

As of June 28, 2009, Yoko Devereaux has ceased operations after the announcement that parent company (Wing Son Garments / WS & Company) has been forced by internal financial issues to withdraw funding.
