= Kirsten Green =

American venture capitalist

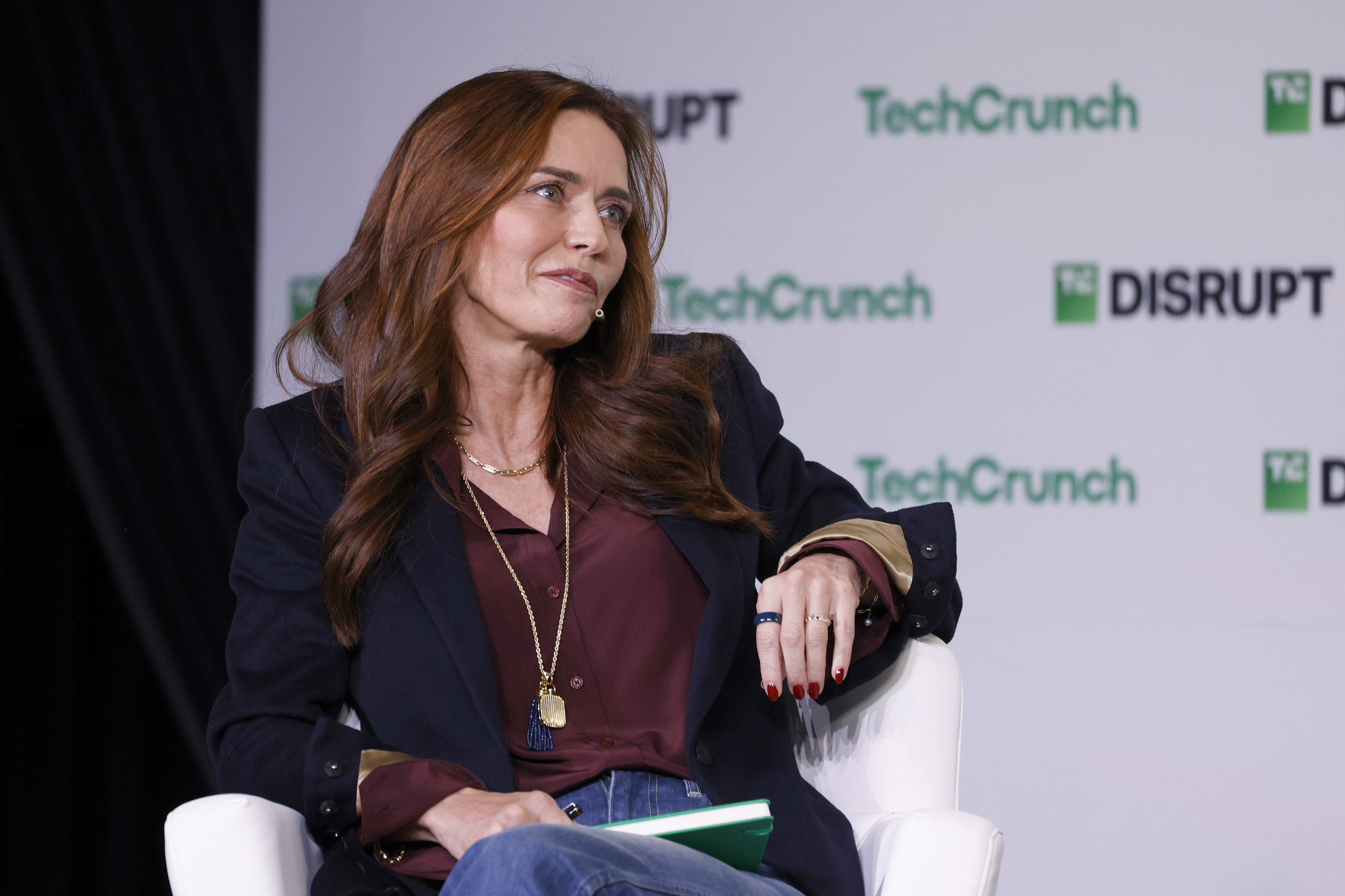
- Kirsten Green in 2025
- Born: 1971 or 1972 (age 54–55)
- Education: UCLA
- Occupation: Venture capitalist
- Known for: Founder and managing partner, Forerunner Ventures
- Spouse: Married
- Children: 2

Kirsten Green (born 1971 or 1972) is an American venture capitalist and the founder and managing partner of Forerunner Ventures. She is known for early investments in companies, and has been included on Forbes Midas List since 2017 and on the Forbes list of The World's 100 Most Powerful Women.

== Early life and education ==
Green was born and raised outside of San Francisco, California. She attended the University of California Los Angeles, where she obtained a degree in business economics.

== Career ==
Green began her career working as a stock analyst for Bank of America Securities (formerly known as Montgomery Securities), covering consumer and retail stocks. Prior to her role at Bank of America Securities, Green worked as an accountant at Deloitte, focusing on the retail sector.

For several years, she worked as an angel investor and independent consultant before founding San Francisco-based Forerunner Ventures in 2012, where she is also the managing director.

Green founded Forerunner to specialize in consumer investing. Some of Green's most notable investments include: Chime, Hims&Hers, Glossier, Bonobos, Warby Parker, and Dollar Shave Club.

On August 14, 2020, Daily Front Row listed Green as one of a group of high-profile investors who purchased W magazine.

In its 12 years in operation, Green has raised over $2.7B in assets under management for Forerunner. In addition to founding Forerunner, Green is a member of the board of directors at Nordstrom.

== Honors and recognition ==
Since 2017, Green has been consecutively included on Forbes' Midas List as well as on the Forbes list of The World's 100 Most Powerful Women. She was most recently recognized in 2024 as part of both those lists.

She was included in Time's 100 Most Influential People and was named a Top 20 Venture Capitalists by The New York Times in 2017 and 2018.

She was named VC of the Year at TechCrunch's 2017 Crunchies Awards, and listed on Vanity Fair's New Establishment list. Green is a founding member of the female mentorship collective All Raise and champions women in the tech industry. She gave a SXSW keynote speech on diversity in a male-dominated industry.

== Personal life ==
Green is married, has two children, and lives in San Francisco.
