= Stefano Tonchi =

Italian fashion journalist, b. 1959

Stefano Tonchi (born 13 October 1959, Florence, Italy) is an Italian journalist, curator, and consultant. Tonchi served as editor-in-chief of W Magazine and consulting chief creative officer of L’Officiel. Since 2024, he has been the editorial director of Harper's Bazaar Italia.

== Early life ==
Tonchi graduated with a Classic Studies degree from Liceo Classico Forteguerri in Pistoia, Italy. He has resided in New York City since 1994.

== Career ==
=== Early career ===
Before W, Tonchi was the creator and editor-in-chief of T: The New York Times Style Magazine, which he introduced in 2004 after serving as style editor at the Sunday Times Magazine. Under his leadership, T increased to fifteen issues annually, expanded internationally, launched a companion website, and was nominated for multiple National Magazine Awards.

Tonchi was listed, along with other members of a so-called "queer cabal" at The New York Times, as #7 in Out magazine's "Power 50" in 2007. In 2008, T was awarded Magazine of the Year from the Society of Publication Designers.

From 1998 to 2003, Tonchi was the Fashion Creative Director for Esquire. In 2001, Esquire earned the Magazine of the Year award from the Society of Publication Designers, as well as National Magazine Award nominations for Photography and Design. Before joining Esquire, Tonchi worked as creative director for J. Crew. Tonchi returned to Conde Nast, having served as Self magazine's creative director from 1994 until 1996. Prior to that, he served as editor, and later, fashion director, for L'Uomo Vogue from 1987 to 1994. At the start of his career in Italy, Tonchi co-founded and served as editor and art director for Westuff magazine, a publication that later evolved into Emporio Armani Magazine.

Tonchi has curated a number of exhibitions and co-authored and edited the accompanying books, including "Excess: Fashion and the Underground in the '80s," "Human Game: Winners and Losers," (exhibitions created for Pitti Immagine at the Stazione Leopolda in Florence), "Uniform: Order and Disorder" (an exhibition in Florence and P.S.1/MOMA) and most recently, "Italiana: Italy Through the Lens of Fashion 1971-2001" at Palazzo Reale in Milan, and "Bellissima: Italy and High Fashion 1945-1968" at the MAXXI Museum in Rome and NSU Fort Lauderdale.

He has edited several books on the intersection of art and fashion. He was the co-author of "Total Living" and "Walter Albini and His Time," and a visual consultant for "Memos: On Fashion In This Millennium" at the Poldi Pezzoli Museum in Milan.

=== W magazine ===
Tonchi was named Editor-in-Chief of W magazine in March 2010.

In June 2019, Tonchi exited W, when the publication was sold by Condé Nast to Surface Media. Tonchi voiced reluctance to accept the change of ownership, so his replacement by Sara Moonves didn't surprise observers. Tonchi sued for breach of contract, and in June 2022, Condé Nast settled the lawsuit and released the following statement: "Stefano Tonchi is a talented journalist and media executive who made enormous contributions to the success of W magazine as editor in chief for over nine years. We are pleased to have resolved this matter with him." Tonchi added: "Leading W magazine and working with talented teams at Condé Nast was a highlight of my career. I am glad we can all move on from our differences."

=== Post-W career ===
In March 2022, he launched Palmer, a luxury media brand, with Michael J Berman, co-founder of George magazine.

He served as consulting chief creative officer of L’Officiel from January 2020 until December 2021.

In May 2024 he was appointed editorial director of Harper's Bazaar Italia.

== Personal life ==
Tonchi's partner is David Maupin; they met in 1987 when Maupin was studying in Florence. The couple has twin daughters. Since 2011, the family has been residing at Osborne Apartments, in a space designed by Annabelle Selldorf. They also maintain a weekend house in Bridgehampton.
