= Sara Moonves =

American magazine editor (born 1985)

- Born: 26 November 1984 (age 41); Los Angeles, California, US
- Occupation: Editor
- Parents: Les Moonves; Nancy Wiesenfeld

Sara Moonves (born 1984) is an American magazine editor. She was promoted to editor in chief of W, a fashion magazine, in 2019. Her appointment stirred vigorous scrutiny and discussion, with an article in The New York Times about her titled "The Most Watched Editor at Fashion Week".

== Early life ==
Moonves's father, Les Moonves, was a television executive, and The New York Times described her childhood as being surrounded by celebrities. Moonves had a brief acting career as a child, appearing in four episodes of Full House, playing Michelle Tanner's friend. It was reported that future actor Jonah Hill was a good friend. Moonves has a younger brother, Michael, who was born in 1988. Moonves is Jewish. Her parents divorced in 2004, and her father eventually remarried Julie Chen Moonves, host of The Talk and Big Brother. She also has a younger half-brother, Charlie, who was born in 2009.

She attended high school in Los Angeles at the Harvard-Westlake School and earned a degree in journalism from the New York University Gallatin School of Individualized Study.

== Career in publishing ==
Moonves interned at Vogue magazine, during her studies, and was hired there after her graduation. From 2010 to 2013, she left Vogue to follow Sally Singer, a senior editor who had mentored her, who had been hired to become editor of T: The New York Times Style Magazine.

She followed Singer back to Vogue to become a contributing fashion editor.

W magazine hired her as style director in 2017. On June 25, 2019, Condé Nast sold W to Future Media, and Moonves replaced the previous editor, Stefano Tonchi.

On March 25, 2020, Moonves laid off most employees. Employees in the online department were retained on reduced salaries. Her boss, Marc Lotenberg, CEO of Future Media, said the magazine had to be put into "survival mode", because "[T]he bottom has dropped out of the luxury market."

On August 14, 2020, W magazine was acquired by a group of new investors. They retained Moonves as editor in chief. Daily Front Row credited Moonves with lining up the investors.
