= John Fairchild (editor) =

American publisher and editor

John Burr Fairchild (March 6, 1927 – February 27, 2015) was the publisher and editor in chief of Women's Wear Daily (WWD) from 1960 to 1996 and the founding editor of W magazine in 1972.

== Early life and education ==
Fairchild was born in Newark, New Jersey, and grew up in Glen Ridge. His father was Louis Fairchild, who joined WWD in 1924, and Louis's father was Edmund Fairchild, the founder of Fairchild Publications. John was a direct descendant of Vice President Aaron Burr. He graduated from Kent School in Kent, Connecticut, in 1946 and Princeton. He had a brief tour in the Army but did not see combat. In 1949, while at Fairchild's Paris office, he met his future wife Jill.

== Career ==
He became the European bureau chief of Fairchild Publications in 1955, the publisher of Women's Wear Daily in 1960 and the founder of W in 1972. He wrote a column for the back page of W under the pseudonym Countess Louise J. Esterhazy. Under his control, Women's Wear Daily was transformed from a negligible trade journal into a notorious, influential and controversial fashion publication that became known as the "bible of fashion".

Today, WWD is owned by Penske Media Corporation (PMC) started by Jay Penske (son of race-car driver Roger Penske), alongside sister fashion publications Sourcing Journal and Footwear News. In 2020, W was acquired by Bustle Digital Group, Mic, and W Media, a joint venture led by Karlie Kloss.

== Death ==
Fairchild died on February 27, 2015, at age of 87.

== Publications ==
- Fairchild, John (1989). Chic savages. New York: Simon and Schuster. ISBN 9780671683344.
- Fairchild, John (1965). The fashionable savages. Doubleday.
- Fairchild, John (1967). The moonflower couple. Doubleday.
