= The Osborne =

Residential building in Manhattan, New York

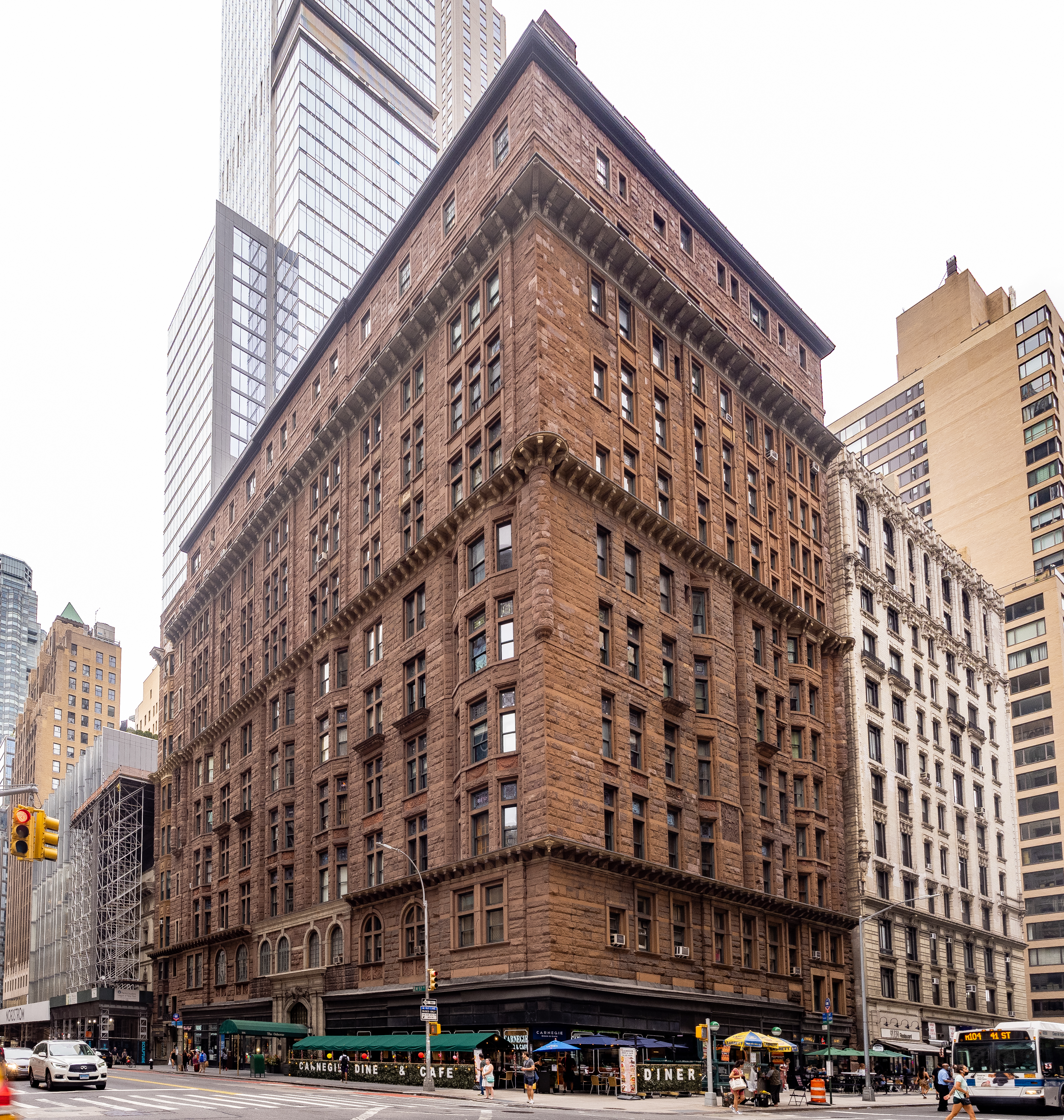
- Southeast corner as seen in 2021

General information
- Type: Housing cooperative
- Architectural style: Italian Renaissance
- Location: 205 West 57th Street, New York City, United States
- Coordinates: 40°45′57″N 73°58′49″W
- Construction started: 1883
- Completed: 1885
- Renovated: 1891, 1906, 1962

Technical details
- Structural system: Masonry bearing wall; steel-framed annex
- Floor count: 11 (front); 15 (rear)

Design and construction
- Architect: James Edward Ware
- Main contractor: Thomas Osborne
- Osborne Apartments
- U.S. National Register of Historic Places
- New York State Register of Historic Places
- New York City Landmark
- Location: 205 West 57th Street, Manhattan, New York
- Built: 1883
- Architect: James E. Ware
- Architectural style: Renaissance, Romanesque
- NRHP reference No.: 93000333
- NYSRHP No.: 06101.006761
- NYCL No.: 1770

Significant dates
- Added to NRHP: April 22, 1993
- Designated NYSRHP: March 16, 1993
- Designated NYCL: August 13, 1991

The Osborne, also known as the Osborne Apartments or 205 West 57th Street, is an apartment building at Seventh Avenue and 57th Street in the Midtown Manhattan neighborhood of New York City, New York, U.S. The original portion of the Osborne was designed by James Edward Ware and constructed from 1883 to 1885. An annex to the west, designed by Alfred S. G. Taylor and Julian Clarence Levi, was constructed in 1906. The Osborne is one of the oldest extant luxury apartment buildings in New York City.

The Osborne's facade is clad in rusticated blocks of brownstone, with a main entrance on 57th Street and a variety of window configurations. The first floor has an elaborate foyer and lobby, while the other floors contain apartments in duplex arrangements. The southern section of the building, facing 57th Street, is 11 stories tall and originally contained main living spaces with high ceilings. The northern section, at the rear of the building, is 15 stories tall and contained the bedrooms and servant's rooms. The Osborne was originally built with 38 apartments, although many of these units were gradually subdivided starting in the early 1920s.

The building's namesake was the stone contractor Thomas Osborne, who had acquired the land in 1883 from restaurateur John Taylor, constructing the building as a speculative investment. The $2 million construction cost forced Thomas Osborne into foreclosure, leading Taylor's family to acquire the building in 1889. The Taylors sold the Osborne in 1961, and it was turned into a housing cooperative the next year. Throughout its history, the Osborne has housed many artists, actors, and musicians, as well as upper-middle-class residents such as doctors and lawyers. The New York City Landmarks Preservation Commission designated the building as a city landmark in 1991, and it was added to the National Register of Historic Places in 1993.

== Site ==
The Osborne, also known as the Osborne Apartments, is on the northwest corner of 57th Street and Seventh Avenue, two blocks south of Central Park, in the Midtown Manhattan neighborhood of New York City, New York, U.S. As built, the Osborne measured 150 feet (46 m) along 57th Street to the south and 100 feet (30 m) along Seventh Avenue to the east. The Osborne was extended by 25 feet (7.6 m) to the west in 1906, giving the Osborne a frontage of 175 feet (53 m) on 57th Street and 100 feet on Seventh Avenue. The site covers 17,572 square feet (1,632.5 m^{2}) and was created by combining six land lots.

The Osborne shares the city block with the American Fine Arts Society (also known as the Art Students League of New York building) and the Central Park Tower to the west, 5 Columbus Circle to the northwest, and the Saint Thomas Choir School to the north. The Osborne is cater-corner from Carnegie Hall. It is also near 218 West 57th Street to the southwest; 888 Seventh Avenue and the Rodin Studios to the south; Alwyn Court, The Briarcliffe, and the Louis H. Chalif Normal School of Dancing to the east; and 200 and 220 Central Park South to the north. Right outside the building is an entrance to the New York City Subway's 57th Street–Seventh Avenue station, served by the N, Q, R, and W trains.

The Osborne is part of a former artistic hub around a two-block section of West 57th Street between Sixth Avenue and Broadway. The hub had been developed during the late 19th and early 20th centuries. The hub was developed following the opening of Carnegie Hall in 1891, though the Osborne predates Carnegie Hall. Several buildings in the area were constructed as residences for artists and musicians, such as 130 and 140 West 57th Street, the Osborne, and the Rodin Studios, as well as the demolished Sherwood Studios and Rembrandt. In addition, the area contained the headquarters of organizations such as the American Fine Arts Society, the Lotos Club, and the American Society of Civil Engineers at 220 West 57th Street. By the 21st century, the artistic hub had largely been replaced with Billionaires' Row, a series of luxury skyscrapers around the southern end of Central Park. The Osborne was also part of a hub of luxury buildings developed on the northernmost end of Seventh Avenue, around Carnegie Hall, by 1900.

== Architecture ==
The Osborne was designed and built by James Edward Ware, who completed the structure in 1885. It was expanded with an annex to the west in 1906, designed by Alfred S. G. Taylor and Julien Clarence Levi. Ware designed the Osborne in a similar manner an Italian Renaissance-style palazzo. The Osborne also contains some Romanesque Revival design features such as round-arched entrance and window openings, a rough-cut stone cladding, and recessed windows. It is the second-oldest luxury apartment building in New York City, behind the Dakota, which was completed in 1884.

The primary section of the Osborne faces south toward 57th Street and is designed with 11 stories. The rear section, facing north, contains 15 duplex levels, though the roof is at the same height as in the rest of the building. The northern portion of the building contains two "light wells". The original structure contains a light well halfway along the northern elevation. The placement of this light well was unusual, given that many contemporary structures had light courts at the front, which for the Osborne would be the southern elevation. The other light well is between the annex and the western side of the original building. The Osborne, including its annex, is 162 feet (49 m) tall.

=== Facade ===
The Osborne's facade is clad largely with rusticated blocks of brownstone. Architectural writers Sarah Landau and Carl Condit theorized that the material was meant to evoke the design of the brownstone row houses that were common across the city, while architectural writer Robert A. M. Stern wrote that the use of brownstone may have instead been used to "convey a sense of the power of stone". The namesake and developer, Thomas Osborne, expected that the facade could attract residents of middle-class brownstone row houses. The superstructure is constructed of masonry bearing walls up to 4 feet (1.2 m) deep.

The primary elevation, or side, faces 57th Street, while the secondary elevation is on Seventh Avenue. The 57th Street side has ten vertical bays—eight from the original design and two from the 1906 annex—while the Seventh Avenue side has eight bays. Large cornices with modillions run atop the second, sixth, and ninth floors. The facade contains stylistic details such as carved stone panels with classical iconography. Projecting oriel windows were also added to provide light to the apartments. In general, the exterior was intended to reflect the ornate design of the interior. The 15 duplex levels at the rear accommodated the shorter ceiling heights of the rooms there.

==== Base ====
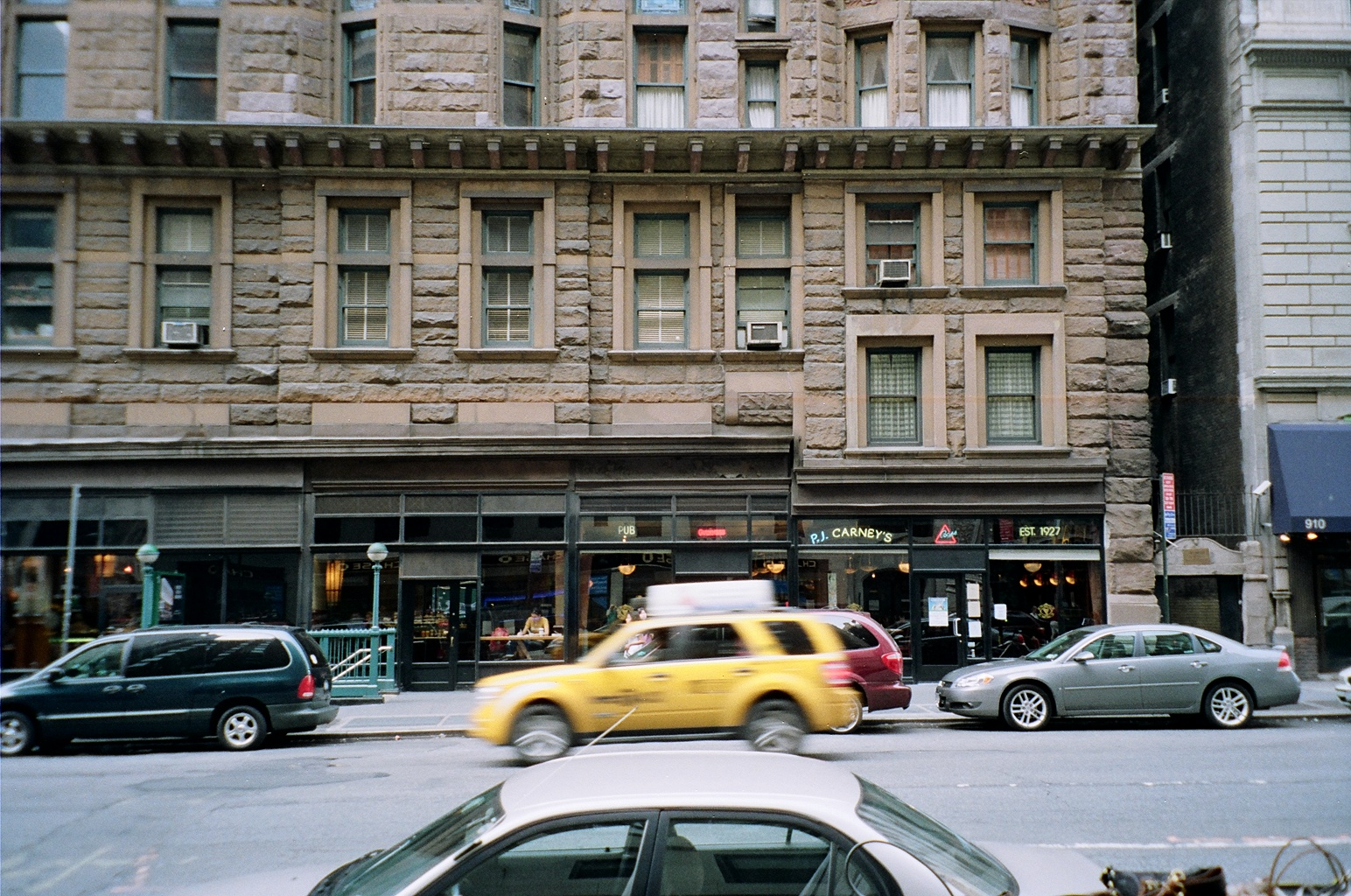
Seen from across Seventh Avenue

The base is composed of the lowest two stories. At ground level, the main entrance is in the center of the original facade on 57th Street, between the fourth and fifth bays from the east. The entrance is within a white segmental arch, above which is a scrolled keystone flanked by garlands. Inside the arch opening is a wooden double door with a leaded-glass transom window above it. The arch is flanked by two pairs of pilasters supporting a short entablature; a pair of glass-and-metal lanterns are mounted on the inner pair of pilasters. The remainder of the ground level contains storefronts. A small band course runs between the first and second stories. An entrance porch formerly projected onto 57th Street. There was also an areaway running around the building, traversed only by a small overpass.

On the 2nd story along 57th Street, the original facade has eight bays. Within the center two bays, now the fourth and fifth bays from the east, there are four round-arched windows, topped by flat keystones. The two bays on either side, now the second, third, sixth, and seventh bays, each contain a single round-arched window with a flat keystone above and a decorative stone panel below. The outermost pair of bays, now the first and eighth bays, each contain a pair of rectangular sash windows. On Seventh Avenue, the seven southernmost bays each contain one rectangular sash window at the 2nd story. A modillioned cornice runs above the 2nd story along 57th Street and Seventh Avenue, except in the fourth and fifth bays along 57th Street. The cornice was intended to give the impression that the building was shorter than it actually was.

The two westernmost bays along 57th Street comprise the 1906 annex and contain three shorter stories within the same double-height base: the ground floor, followed by two mezzanine floors. Both mezzanines contain a triple-sided, metal-clad oriel window within the left-side bay, which is the tenth bay from the east. The annex's right-side bay, the ninth bay from the east, contains a rectangular window opening on each mezzanine. The northernmost Seventh Avenue bay also contains three shorter stories in the double-height base, with two rectangular windows on either mezzanine floor.

==== Upper stories ====
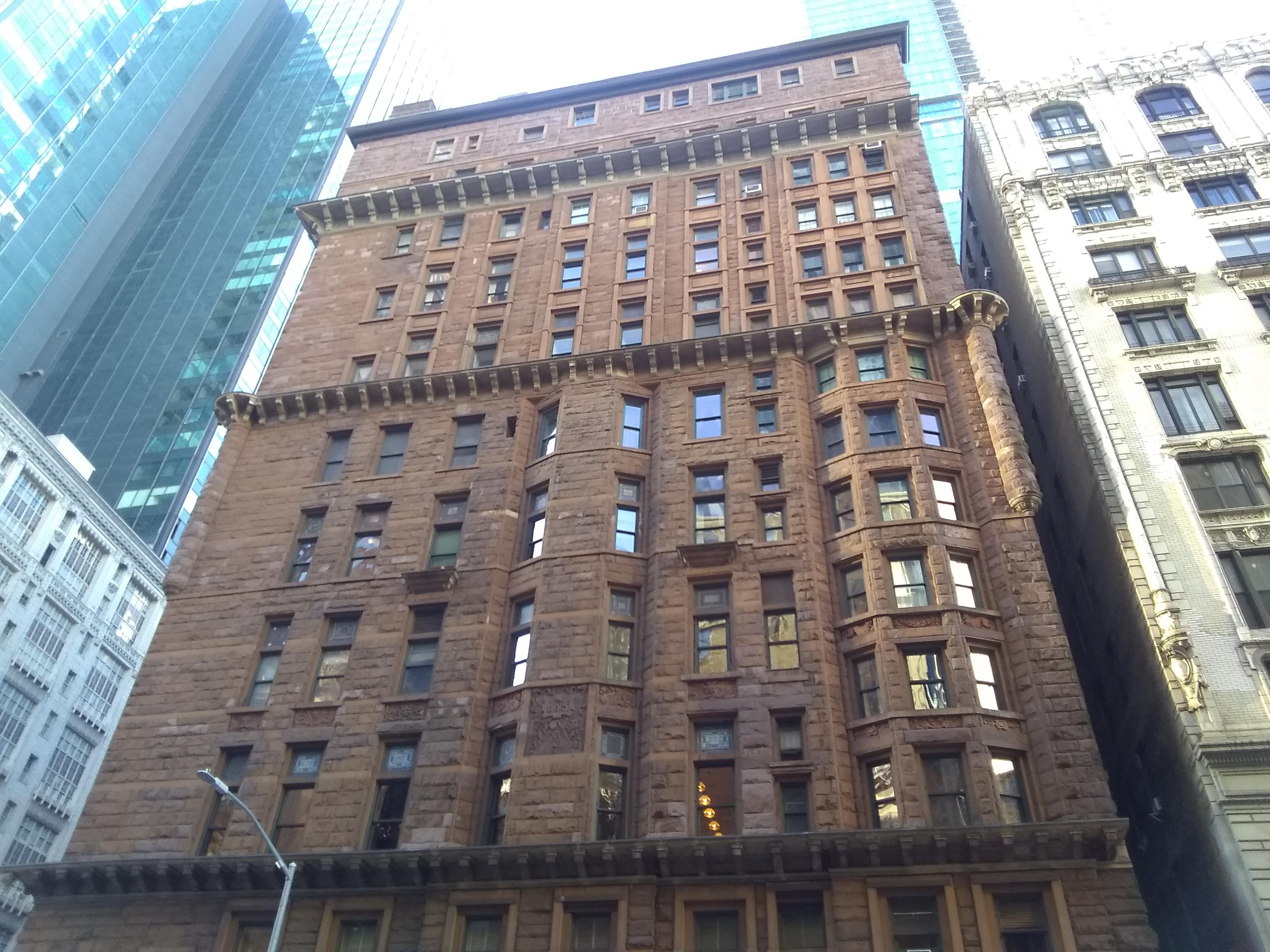
Northernmost bay on Seventh Avenue

On the 3rd through 6th stories, the original section of the 57th Street facade contains triple-sided, stone-clad oriel windows on the first, fourth, fifth, and eighth bays from the east. The second, third, sixth, and seventh bays contain rectangular windows, with balconettes at the fifth story. Above all eight bays, there are carved stone spandrel panels between the 3rd- and 4th-story windows, and stained-glass transom panels near the top of each 3rd-, 4th-, and 5th-story window opening. In addition, bartizans rise from the 5th and 6th story at each corner of the original facade, supporting the cornice. A similar window arrangement appears on the seven southernmost bays facing Seventh Avenue, where the fourth and fifth bays from the south are grouped into a single oriel structure.

On the 7th through 9th stories of the original 57th Street facade, the first, fourth, fifth, and eighth bays each contain three windows per story. The second, third, sixth, and seventh bays of this facade each contain two windows per story. The windows in each story are separated by carved stone spandrel panels. In addition, there are stained-glass transom panels near the top of each 7th- and 8th-story window opening. A similar window arrangement appears on the seven southernmost bays facing Seventh Avenue, except that each bay has a single window.

On both 57th Street and Seventh Avenue, there are rectangular windows on the 10th and 11th stories, with a horizontal band course between these floors. The windows on the 10th and 11th stories do not necessarily align with those on the other floors. There is a copper cornice above the 11th story.

The 57th Street annex rises only to the 10th story. The 3rd through 9th stories of the annex correspond to those in the original building. They contain a metal oriel on the left and a sash window on the right, similar to at the base. As with the original facade, there are bartizans on the 5th and 6th story, which flank the oriel and support the cornice. The annex's 10th story has a triple rectangular window.

The 3rd through 6th stories of the northernmost Seventh Avenue bay contain six offset duplex levels, each with a triple-sided, stone-clad oriel window. The 7th through 9th stories of the northernmost Seventh Avenue bay contain four offset duplex levels, each with a triple rectangular window. (Note: In the northernmost Seventh Avenue bay, the 1st, 3rd, 5th, 7th, 10th, and 11th stories correspond to the rest of the building. There are also nine mezzanines: two each above the 1st, 3rd, and 5th stories, and three above the 7th story.)

=== Interior ===
==== Entrance foyer and lobby ====
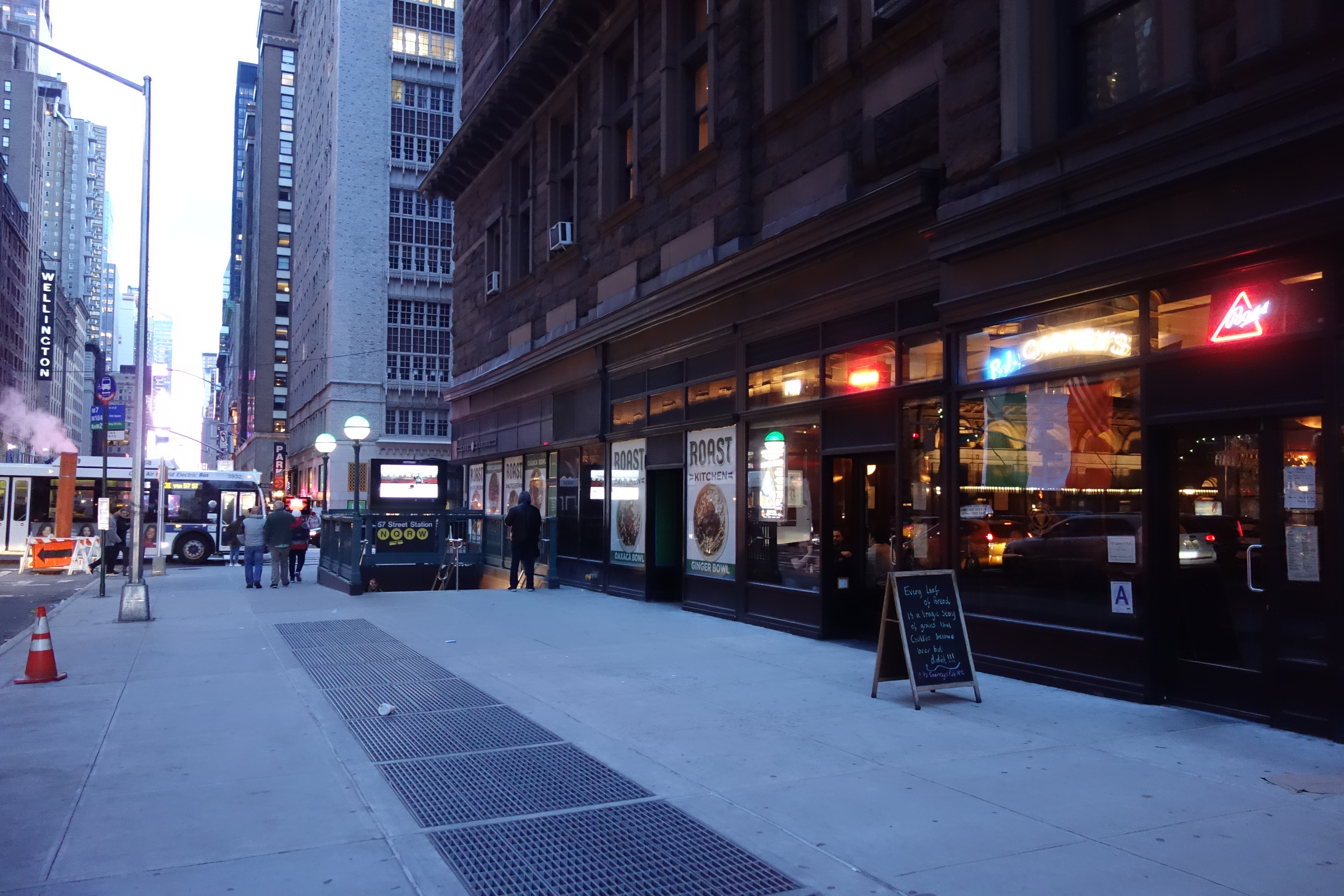
Storefronts

The entrance foyer and lobby form a connected space. The decorative details were designed by architect Stanford White, muralist John La Farge, and designer Jacob Adolphus Holzer. The lobby was mainly the work of Holzer and is designed in marble, mosaics, murals, gilded surfaces, and leaded glass. The Tiffany glass in the foyer and lobby, created by Louis Comfort Tiffany, was reputed to be Tiffany's first decorating job. The sculptor Augustus Saint-Gaudens was also involved in the foyer and lobby's design. The spaces are decorated in shades of red, green, and blue. According to the writer Elizabeth Hawes, the building's lobby "had been designed to overwhelm, to transport".

The entrance foyer measures 20 feet (6.1 m) square with a 20-foot ceiling. It is connected to the lobby by a short flight of marble and copper steps. (Note: The New York Times characterizes the entry hall as being 26 by 15 feet (7.9 by 4.6 m).)

The lobby extends north of the foyer and measures 92 by 14 feet (28.0 by 4.3 m), with a ceiling 15 feet (4.6 m) high. The floors contain mosaics made of small tiles, alternating with Italian marble slabs. The western and eastern walls of the lobby contain marble wainscoting, interspersed with plaster plaques of nude figures and garlands, designed to resemble bronze. Carved-plaster cap friezes and mosaic tiles run along the walls. Above the wainscot, the walls feature a silver-gilt wall surface, as well as carvings, mosaic tiles, and roundels. There are marble niches with benches, as well as Tiffany mosaics and stained glass on the niche walls. The Osborne was the first building to use foil-backed mosaics in a nonreligious setting. The ceiling, which is coffered, is painted in red and blue tones and gold leaf, in a manner similar to the ceiling at J. P. Morgan's 36th Street library. The space is lit by four copper chandeliers and sixteen bronze double sconces. Two marble staircases lead from the lobby.

In addition to the lobby and entrance foyer, there were other communal spaces within the building, giving it the feel of an enclosed community. On the second floor was a banquet room. There was a private billiards room, as well as a florist's shop, doctor's office, and chemist in the basement. The original plans called for a rooftop croquet lawn, which was not built.

==== Apartments ====
The National Park Service writes that each of the 2nd through 10th stories originally contained four apartments; according to Hawes, there were fewer apartments on the 2nd floor because that story also included the banquet hall. There were two apartments on the ground floor, for 38 total units on the ground through 10th floors. The 11th floor did not contain any residents and was used by service workers and as storage. Each of the upper stories was separated into western and eastern halves, with two apartments per side. Each side was served by its own elevator and staircase, connected only at ground level. When completed, the building had four elevators and a heating and power plant.

Each apartment was arranged in a specific way, with a parlor, reception room, library room, dining room, pantry, and kitchen in the front, as well as bedrooms in the rear. The main living spaces, where guests were entertained, contained 15-foot (4.6 m) ceilings. The front end, facing 57th Street, contained the apartments' libraries and parlor rooms. The foyer, dining room, kitchen, and one bedroom of each apartment also contained high ceilings. The rear sections had bedrooms and private baths, separated from the main living areas by flights of seven steps, and the ceilings are just over 8 feet (2.4 m) high. The westernmost apartments of each floor, as expanded in 1906, were generally larger than the other units, with seven bedrooms and enlarged reception and dining rooms. The apartment designs were also marked by their elaborate interior features, including mahogany wood decoration, bronze fireplace mantels, and crystal chandeliers. The parquet floor surfaces contained banded edges, and the walls were soundproofed and insulated for privacy.

In the early and mid-20th century, many of the apartments were subdivided, the ground-floor apartments were removed, and new apartments were created on the 11th floor. The National Park Service wrote in 1993 that the Osborne had 109 units, of which 14 retained their original large configurations. As a result of these subdivisions, the modern layouts of the apartments are more complex. For instance, an apartment might have its entrance in one of the rear mezzanines and its main rooms in the high-ceiling portion. Other units were configured as "apartments within apartments", where the only access was through another tenant's residence. The haphazard nature of the conversions resulted in the sealing-off of spaces such as an entire room and a staircase. Among the modern-day apartments are a unit with vaulted-brick ceilings, as well as a studio with mahogany decorations and a spiral staircase.

== History ==
During the early 19th century, apartment developments in the city were generally associated with the working class, but by the 1870s, apartments were also becoming desirable among the middle and upper classes. Between 1880 and 1885, more than ninety apartment buildings were developed in the city. The advent of the passenger elevator enabled the construction of taller apartment buildings such as the Osborne and the Dakota, whereas previously apartment buildings had been limited to six or seven stories. (Note: These included the Osborne Building on Fifth Avenue between 52nd and 53rd Street, which is unrelated to the current apartment structure.)

Simultaneously, West 57th Street was being developed with townhouses, some of which were known as New York City's "choicest" residences, as well as artists' studio apartments. 57th Street attracted large developments because it was wider than other crosstown streets and was similar in width to a north–south avenue. The area around the Osborne was relatively undeveloped in the early 1880s but benefited from the presence of Central Park two blocks north. At the time, the street's developments included the Rembrandt Studio Building, the Calvary Baptist Church, and various row houses.

=== Development ===
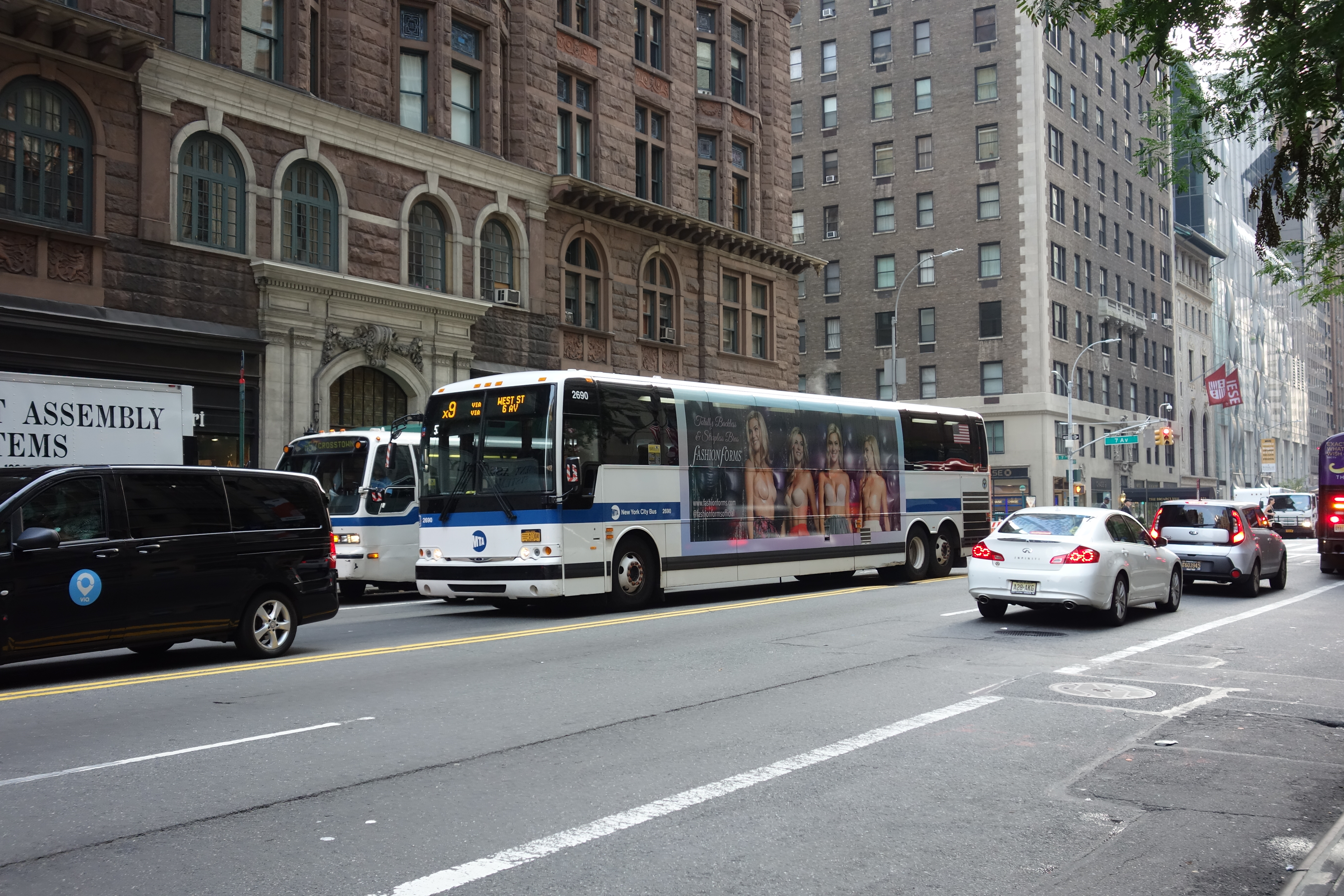
A bus outside the base of the building on 57th Street

The Osborne's namesake was Thomas Osborne, an Irish immigrant who ran a successful stone contracting business. In 1883, he purchased a lot for $210,000 (equivalent to $7,256,250 in 2025) from restaurant operator John Taylor. After an architectural design competition, Osborne hired Ware to design an apartment building on the site. Ware submitted plans for an 11- and 15-story brownstone apartment to the New York City Department of Buildings that May, to cost $650,000. The original plans included a fireproof structure with four elevators; some iron-and-marble staircases; various spaces such as a florist and pharmacy; and the newest electric, plumbing, and heating systems of the time. Osborne had been inspired by Queen Victoria's Isle of Wight residence and reportedly sent workers to examine the architecture of that residence. He bragged that the 57th Street building would probably be the tallest in the city, if not the United States, at a height of 200 feet (61 m).

In October 1883, three investors formed a company to buy Osborne's apartment building for $700,000. However, the sale never happened. By the next year, Osborne was still anticipating that he would sell the building upon its completion. The building's roof was completed by June 1884, when the apartments were reported as "nearly ready for tenants". Advertisements in New York City newspapers boasted, in boldface letters, that the building was "the most magnificently finished and decorated apartment house in the world". The first tenants moved into the building in November 1885. The next month, the Real Estate Record and Guide reported that the Osborne was sold to unnamed investors for $1,209,000 (equivalent to $43,322,500 in 2025). The buyer was subsequently revealed to be John Taylor's son John H. Taylor; by then, the senior John Taylor had died. The development of the Osborne spurred the construction of nearby apartment houses, including the Alwyn Court and Rodin Studios.

=== Modifications ===
The building had ultimately cost $2 million to construct, at least part of which was covered by loans that John H. Taylor had made to Osborne. The lavish decorations contributed to the massive costs, which turned out to be excessive for Osborne. John Taylor's estate foreclosed on the Osborne at auction in 1888. William Taylor, another member of the Taylor family, bought the building that March for $1,009,250 (equivalent to $36,164,792 in 2025). The next year, Ware expanded the attic to a full size; this provided additional room for servants' quarters while placing the roof at a uniform height. The northern section of the building had contained 14 levels, while the southern section was largely 10 stories with a partial 11th-story attic. The cornice of the northern section had originally sloped downward because of the uneven roof height.

Contemporary advertisements described the Osborne as occupying "the highest ground below Fifty-seventh Street"; this feature became more attractive to potential tenants, as the state government had passed the Daly Law in 1885 to limit similar structures to five or six stories. As such, despite Thomas Osborne's financial difficulties, the building was successful in attracting middle-class residents. By early 1896, the Osborne was fully occupied, and the Taylor estate was looking to sell the Osborne so the estate could be closed out. The estate also planned to sell adjoining 25-by-100-foot (7.6 by 30.5 m) lot to the west, which adjoined the Art Students League building. John S. Ely, a son-in-law of the late John Taylor, paid $1.01 million for the building and $35,000 for the adjacent lot at an auction in March 1896. At the time, the neighborhood was being developed rapidly, and The New York Times wrote, "It is safe to assume that these lots will be worth double their present value ten years hence." A glass and metal sidewalk canopy was erected c. 1900.

The Taylor family started constructing the 57th Street annex in 1906, on the adjoining lot to the west. The annex was designed by family member Alfred S. G. Taylor, in conjunction with J. C. Levi. The annex, completed in 1908, provided additional bedroom space for the westernmost apartments, which were each given seven bedrooms and an expanded reception room. Many businesses moved to the surrounding area in the late 19th and early 20th centuries. Thus, in 1919, the Taylor family converted the ground-floor apartments to commercial spaces, which the family believed would be more profitable. At this time, the main entrance porch and the moat that originally surrounded the ground floor were removed. Walter J. Salmon took a 21-year lease for the Osborne that year. The upper floors were subdivided into smaller units starting in 1922, and the 11th-floor attic was converted to apartments in 1941.

=== Cooperative conversion ===
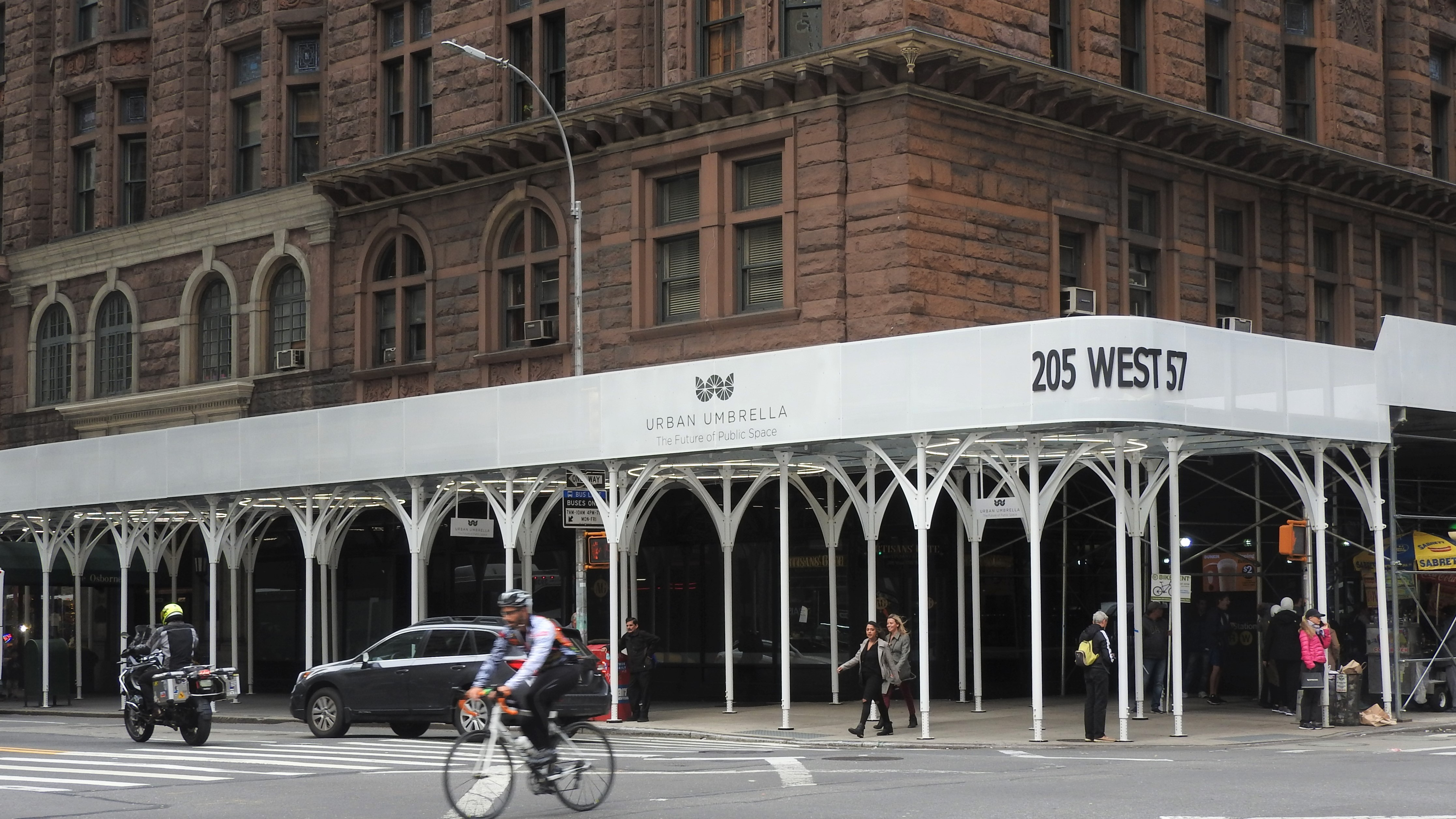
The base, seen with scaffolding around it in 2019

The Taylor family could not maintain the Osborne in the mid-20th century, and the interior had degraded by the 1950s. In 1961, the Osborne was sold to the Linland Corporation, operated by real-estate investor Sarah Korein, in a deal that valued the building at $2.5 million (equivalent to $26,934,855 in 2025). Korein had planned to demolish the Osborne, replacing it with a 17-story residential building designed by Robert Bien. In response, tenants collected $500,000 to give to Korein in exchange for the building's ownership. The payment was roughly double the $250,000 deposit that Korein had paid for the building. The planned replacement tower was canceled the next year after the Osborne Tenants Corporation bought the Osborne and converted it into a cooperative. The co-op board took a $2 million mortgage for the building in 1965.

Davida Tenenbaum Deutsch, an architectural historian who lived in the building, started holding bazaars in 1976 to fund the restoration of the lobby, ultimately raising nearly $100,000 (equivalent to $565,789 in 2025). By the mid-1980s, prices for apartments in the Osborne were as high as in comparable apartments on the traditionally wealthy Upper East Side. From 1989 to 1994, the Osborne's cooperative board restored the facade at a cost of $4.1 million (equivalent to $8,906,040 in 2025). During that time, Rambusch Studios restored the lobby. By the early 21st century, the Osborne had become part of Billionaires' Row, an area with several residential skyscrapers marketed for the ultra-wealthy. After the city's Open Restaurants program (first implemented during the COVID-19 pandemic) became permanent in early 2022, the Osborne's co-op board sued 57th and 7th Associates, to which the building's commercial space was leased. The co-op board claimed that 57th and 7th Associates had failed to enforce restrictions regarding the use by sub-tenants of the building's commercial spaces, including the installation of outdoor dining and unauthorized signage.

== Notable residents ==
Despite its proximity to Carnegie Hall and West 57th Street's arts hub, the Osborne did not have any musicians, artists, or authors listed as residents prior to World War II, and only two architects were recorded as living there during that time. However, it was popular among the upper middle class, with residents including executives, entrepreneurs, lawyers, and doctors. The building's artistic residents largely moved there after World War II. By the 1960s, the Osborne was known as "the residential Carnegie Hall".

Notable residents have included:

- Dana Andrews, actor
- Peter Beard, artist, photographer
- Leonard Bernstein, composer and conductor, lived in unit 4B until 1961 and maintained an office in 2DD until his death
- Shirley Booth, actress
- Hortense Calisher, writer
- Jessica Chastain, actress, purchased unit 4B in 2015
- Dane Clark, actor
- John Clark, actor, and his wife Lynn Redgrave, an actress
- Van Cliburn, pianist
- Gray Foy, artist, and his spouse Leo Lerman, a writer and editor, lived in unit 6C from 1967 until their respective deaths in 2012 and 1994
- Gary Graffman, American classical pianist
- Paul Hartman, Broadway performer
- Eric Hotung, businessman
- Phil Jackson, professional basketball player, coach, and executive, lived in unit 3B while serving as a New York Knicks basketball team executive
- Fran Lebowitz, American author and public speaker, who spoke of the building in the documentary Pretend It's a City, moved into the building in 1984
- Julian Clarence Levi, architect, art collector, philanthropist
- Ira Levin, novelist
- Elinor Lipman, novelist
- David Maupin, gallerist, art dealer
- Lorne Michaels, producer of Saturday Night Live
- Sylvia Miles, actress
- Alice Nielsen, Broadway performer and opera singer
- Robert Osborne, the host of Turner Classic Movies, moved into unit 3DA in 1988 and also owned units 1CB and 2DD until his death in 2017
- Charles Osgood, newscaster
- Tom Poston, actor
- Joseph M. Proskauer, New York Supreme Court judge
- Lynn Redgrave, actress
- John Coit Spooner, U.S. senator from Wisconsin, lived in the Osborne until his death in 1919
- Bobby Short, singer, lived in unit 4B for fourteen years until 1986
- Faith Stewart-Gordon, owner of the nearby Russian Tea Room restaurant
- Larry Storch, actor, lived in unit 4B right after Bernstein moved out
- Blanche Thebom, opera singer and director
- Stefano Tonchi, journalist, curator, and consultant
- Helen Traubel, opera singer, took a suite in the Osborne in 1940
- André Watts, pianist
- Maury Yeston, composer, lyricist, educator and musicologist
- Gig Young, American actor, briefly lived in unit 1BB before killing himself and his wife there in 1978
>

== Impact ==
=== Reception ===
An unnamed critic for the New York Evening Post reviewed the design negatively, writing in 1884, "An attempt has been made by Mr. Jas. E. Ware to give variety to the immense number of windows in the eleven stories on the street fronts. For the fifteen stories in the rear [...] nothing can be done". The critic particularly regarded the 6th- and 9th-story cornices as haphazard. The next year, a critic for the Real Estate Record negatively regarded the design as "crude and unskillful", and wrote that "there is nothing architecturally interesting about the Osborne, except the grouping of the stories, and here and there some carving that is good in execution". In 2020, The New York Times described the Osborne as "kind of grand but dour", as opposed to the "extravagantly ornate" Alwyn Court across the street.

Other critics were more positive. Carter Horsley wrote for City Realty that "Perhaps more than any other building [...] this is a presence, a pile of architecture that manifests great power." Roger Starr, writing for The New York Times in 1983, stated that the ornate lobby demonstrated that "even the most powerful families in the country can live well in apartments". The St. Petersburg Times reported in 1988 that the "opulent interior" counterbalanced the "undistinguished exterior". According to the St. Petersburg Times, tenants appreciated the building so much that they held parties to celebrate the anniversary of its completion. Robert A. M. Stern wrote in his 1999 book New York 1880 that the building was "the grandest of the apartment buildings south of Central Park and one of the city's incomparable monuments to shared domesticity".

=== Landmark designations ===
The New York City Landmarks Preservation Commission (LPC) first considered city-landmark status for the Osborne in 1966 and 1967. The Osborne's co-op board withdrew the building's application for landmark status because of concerns that landmark status would entail additional regulation, given that modifications to city landmarks required LPC approval. A second landmark hearing was held in 1980, followed by a third such hearing in 1985. After a fourth set of hearings in 1989, the LPC ultimately designated the Osborne's exterior as a city landmark in 1991. The Osborne was added to the National Register of Historic Places in 1993.

As early as 1980, the lobby and foyer were also considered for interior-landmark status. During the 1985 hearing, the LPC had considered designating the lobby and foyer as an interior landmark. The LPC deferred a decision on the designation because the agency's rules mandated that interior landmarks had to be public spaces. In late 2015, the LPC again hosted a public hearing on whether to designate the Osborne's lobby and foyer as a city landmark. The Victorian Society supported the proposed interior designation but, because the lobby and foyer were legally private interior spaces, Manhattan Community Board 5 and the New York Landmarks Conservancy opposed the designation. This was part of a review of 95 listings that had been calendared by the LPC for several decades but never approved as city landmarks. The LPC rejected the interior-landmark designation in February 2016 because the interior was a private space.

== See also ==
- List of New York City Designated Landmarks in Manhattan from 14th to 59th Streets
- National Register of Historic Places listings in Manhattan from 14th to 59th Streets
