= Steve Hutkins =

Academic background
- Education: University of Wisconsin–Madison College of Letters and Science; New York University

Academic work
- Institutions: New York University

Steve Hutkins is a retired professor at the Gallatin School of New York University and a leading advocate for the United States Post Office. He runs the influential website "Save the Post Office".

== Early life and education ==
He received his BA in English from the University of Wisconsin, a Masters in English and PhD in English Renaissance literature from NYU.

== Save the Post Office ==
Hutkins first became interested in the post office crisis in 2011, when his local post office in his town in New York's Hudson Valley was in danger of closing. He began reading extensively on the Postal Service's plans for closure and restructuring and was inspired to create the website "Save the Post Office" to advocate against closures and to advocate for a sustainable path forward for the institution.

Save the Post Office provides information about post office consolidations, closings, the sale of historic post office buildings to private owners, the efforts people are taking to protect post offices, and the steps citizens can take to save their local post offices when they end up on the closure list.

Hutkins fears that many on the Board of Governors of the United States Postal Service and their corporate allies have demonstrated both publicly and privately that they have an agenda to "eliminate the layoff protections in union contracts, cut the career workforce by nearly half while tripling the number of non-career workers, reduce service standards for first-class mail, do away with Saturday delivery, and give management control of workers benefit plans."

He generally does not support the sale of historic post offices, as their privatization is against the values that built them, especially structures that were built during the Great Depression, which served, according to Hutkins, as "a morale booster for a country that was losing confidence in its government." Their privatization removes an important symbol that the government can do great things.

In addition to managing the "Save the Post Office" website, Hutkins has filed a number of briefs and comments to the Postal Regulatory Commission concerning appeals of post office suspensions and closures.

He has written about historic post offices for the National Trust for Historic Preservation (Section 106, Protective Covenants, and Sale of Historic Post Offices) and he submitted testimony to the 2014 report Preserving Historic Post Offices: A Report to Congress, prepared by The Advisory Council on Historic Preservation.

== Publications ==
=== Journal articles ===
Apollo Meets Dionysius: Interdisciplinarity in Long-standing Interdisciplinary Programs(co-authored with William Newell (Miami University), Daniel Larner (Western Washington University), Eric McGuckin (Sonoma State University), and Karen Oates (George Mason University)). Issues in Integrative Studies 2003 21:9-42.
