= Forerunner Ventures =

American venture capital firm

- Industry: Venture Capital
- Founded: 2012
- Founder: Kirsten Green
- Headquarters: San Francisco, California, United States
- Website: forerunnerventures.com

Forerunner Ventures is a San Francisco-based American venture capital firm. Founded in 2012, Forerunner focuses on early-stage consumer investing. The firm was founded by Kirsten Green, a venture capitalist.

Forerunner invests in health & wellness, retail & ecommerce, consumer finance, education, and social networking. The firm’s notable investments include Chime, Faire, Oura Health, Jet.com, Hims&Hers, Glossier, Dollar Shave Club, and Warby Parker.

As of 2025, Forerunner has raised nearly $3 billion in assets under management. Its most recent fund, Fund VII, is a $500 million fund dedicated to early-stage investing and was the firm’s seventh flagship fund. The firm’s previous fund was a $1 billion fund with two $500m vehicles, one for early-stage and another for growth-stage.
