= Gallatin School of Individualized Study =

Liberal arts school in New York University

Coordinates: 40.7293°N 73.9939°W

- Type: Private
- Established: 1972
- Parent institution: New York University
- Dean: Victoria Rosner
- Academic staff: 42 Full Time; 100 Part Time
- Students: 1,530 Undergraduates; 147 Graduates
- Location: New York City, New York, United States
- Website: gallatin.nyu.edu

The Gallatin School of Individualized Study is a liberal arts school within New York University. Students at Gallatin design an interdisciplinary concentration based on their specific interests and career goals. Most courses can be taken at any of the schools within New York University, in addition to Gallatin's course offerings.

== History ==
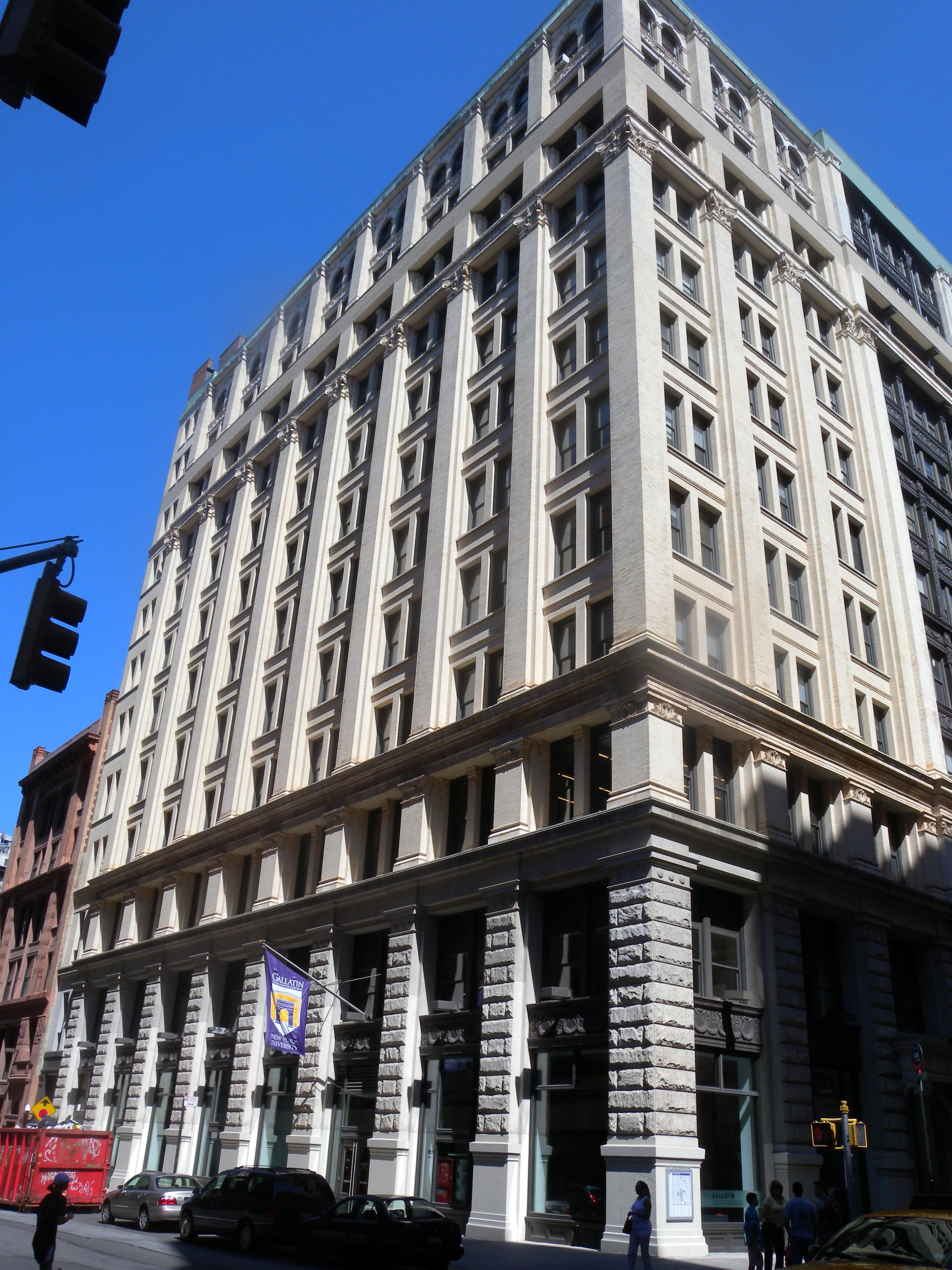
Building of the Gallatin School

The school was founded in 1972 as the University Without Walls. In 1976, the school was renamed the Gallatin Division for Albert Gallatin (secretary of the treasury under Thomas Jefferson and the founder of New York University). In 1995 the school took the name, Gallatin School of Individualized Study.

Herbert London was the school's first dean through 1992. The Gallatin building is situated within the campus of New York University just east of Washington Square Park, at 1 Washington Place in Manhattan, New York City.

The Gallatin School's facilities on the corner of Washington Place and Broadway underwent a redesign in 2007–2008. It was the first renovation project at New York University to achieve LEED certification. The project earned a LEED Gold certification for renovating five floors (approximately 32,000 square feet) of the existing building, including the construction of a theater, art gallery, classrooms, studios, and offices. The main building is named after Georgina Bloomberg.

== Academics ==
Gallatin students develop a concentration, as opposed to a major, that is individualized to suit their interests and goals. A concentration can encompass multiple areas of study and often involves taking courses in various schools within New York University. There are, however, general requirements for graduation. These start with foundation courses (a first year writing seminar, a first year research seminar, and multiple interdisciplinary seminars) and end with an intensive oral discourse called the "colloquium" which is held during a student's final semester.

== Notable people ==
- Sinan Antoon, poet and novelist
- Annabelle Attanasio, actress and filmmaker
- Lynn Ban, jewelry designer
- Timothée Chalamet, actor
- Jennifer Clement, author
- Julian Cyr, politician
- André De Shields, singer and actor
- Kristoffer Diaz, writer
- Natalia Dyer, actress
- Dakota Fanning, actress
- Matt Friend, stand-up comedian
- Keli Goff, journalist and screenwriter
- Midori Goto, violinist
- Anne Hathaway, actress
- Rachel Hilson, actress
- Steve Hutkins, retired professor
- Mark Indelicato, actor
- Billie Lourd, actress
- Adam Mosseri, businessman
- Sara Moonves, magazine editor
- Ashley Olsen, fashion designer, businesswoman, actress
- Mary-Kate Olsen, fashion designer, businesswoman, actress
- Alex Pall, musician
- Phillip Picardi, journalist and magazine editor
- John Ridley, writer and director
- Jane Rosenthal, film producer
- Cole Sprouse, actor
- Dylan Sprouse, actor
- Christy Turlington, model
- Hannah Pearl Utt, actor and director
- Barbara Whitman, theatrical producer
- Jeremy Wineberg, music executive
- Ed Droste, musician
- Karlie Kloss, model
