= Julian Clarence Levi =

Artist, architect and physician

- Born: December 8, 1874; New York City, US
- Died: August 23, 1971 (aged 96); New York City, US
- Education: Columbia College (BA); École des Beaux-Arts
- Occupations: architect, art collector, philanthropist
- Spouse: Alice Fries Levi

Julian Clarence Levi (December 8, 1874 – August 23, 1971) was an American architect, watercolor painter, and philanthropist.

== Biography ==
Levi was born on December 8, 1874, on West 51st Street in Midtown Manhattan. His father, Albert Augustus Levi, was an investment banker originally from Germany and was one of the trustees of the Society for Ethical Culture upon its founding in 1877. The elder Levi was also a brother-in-law of the Seligman brothers who founded J. & W. Seligman & Co. Levi helped found the San Francisco branch of the family business, J. Seligman & Co. Two of his aunts married into the Seligman family and his uncles-in-law included prominent investment bankers Isaac Seligman and Joseph Seligman.

He attended Columbia College, where he was a member of the Philolexian Society, graduating in 1896, and attended the Columbia School of Architecture for two years before moving to Paris to study at the Beaux-Arts de Paris. He joined the practice of Francis H. Kimball upon finishing his studies and designed the J. & W. Seligman & Company Building with Kimball. He subsequently co-founded the architecture practice Taylor & Levi with Alfredo S. G. Taylor and designed commercial buildings and residences. He was a partner in the firm from 1907 to 1962.

In 1929, he helped design a plan for Hebrew University of Jerusalem. He founded the Architects Emergency Committee in 1930 whose purpose was to provide work for architects throughout the Great Depression. In 1937, he co-designed the U.S. Pavilion at the Paris International Exhibition of 1937 and the Romanian House at the New York World’s Fair in 1939. He also served as a president of the Architectural League of New York and was a long-time associate with the American Institute of Architecture. For his work in restoring the Chartres Cathedral, Levi was made a Commander of the Legion of Honor in 1951 by the French government.

Levi was also a watercolorist who painted seascapes, landscapes and still lifes, with some being added to the collections of the Metropolitan Museum of Art as well as Cooper Hewitt. He was called a Renaissance man in his New York Times obituary.

== Personal life ==
Levi was married to Alice Fries Levi, who died in 1961. He died on August 23, 1971. At the time of his death, he was the oldest Columbia alumnus alive. The couple left behind no children.

Levi was a resident in the Osborne Apartments and his apartment was called by The New York Times a "proper setting for a Henry James or Edith Wharton novel" that contained a vast collection of artwork, ranging from Renaissance art to Persian rugs.

== Legacy ==
In 1966, he gave $150,000 to Columbia for the purchase of the Laura Boulton collection of traditional and liturgical music, the most comprehensive collection of ethnic music recordings in the world, which formed the basis of the Center for Ethnomusicology at Columbia.

He bequeathed US$5 million to Columbia upon his death, one of the largest gifts in the university's history. He endowed a number of professorships and helped the university reduce its operating deficit that were incurred due to the Columbia University protests of 1968. He also donated his art collections to the Met, Cooper Hewitt, and the Brooklyn Museum.
