= Glossier =

American skincare and beauty brand

Glossier, Inc.
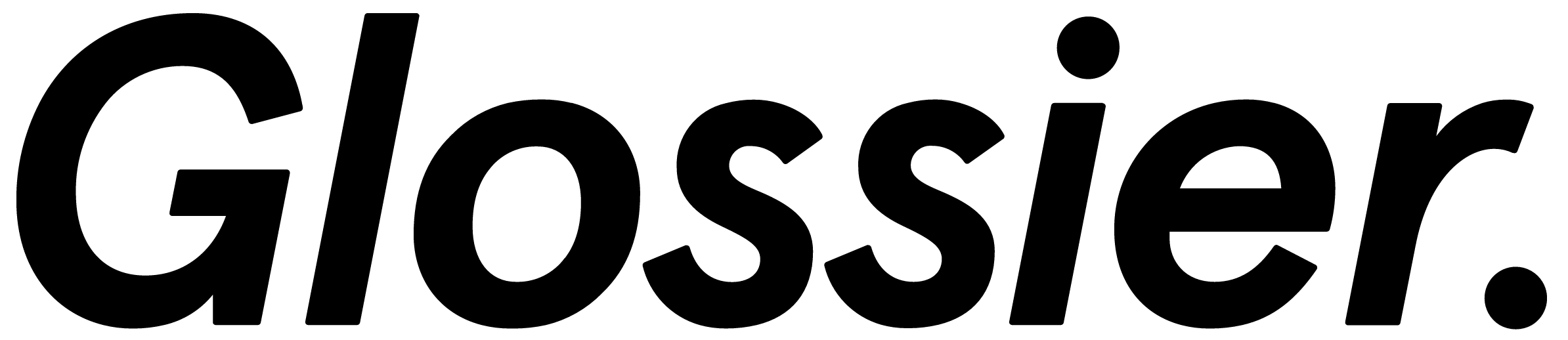

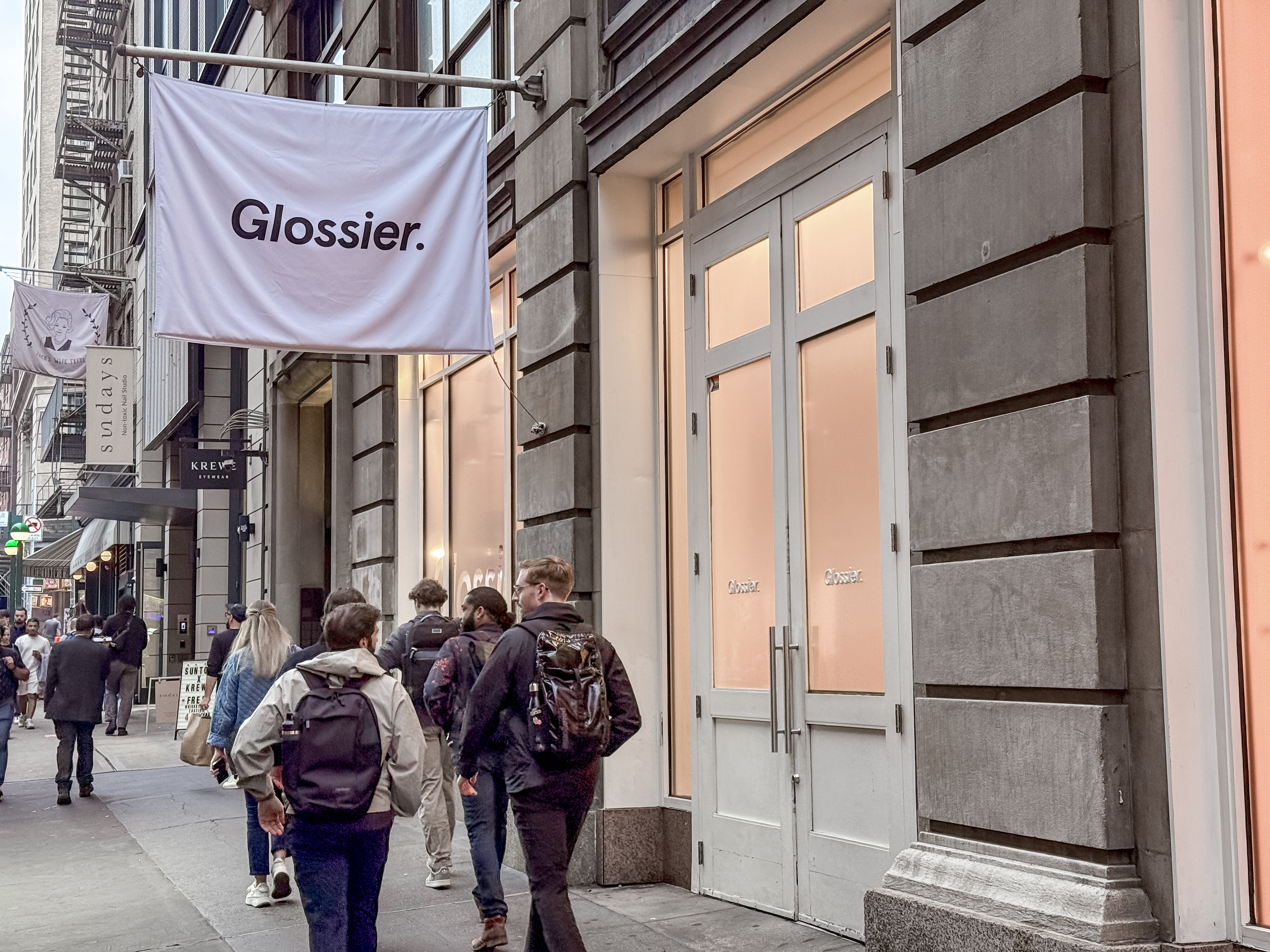
- Type: Private
- Industry: Cosmetics
- Founded: 2014; 12 years ago
- Founder: Emily Weiss
- Headquarters: 233 Spring Street, New York City, United States
- Area served: Worldwide
- Key people: Colin Walsh (CEO); Emily Weiss (executive chairwoman)
- Products: Skin care, cosmetics, body care, fragrance, and merchandise
- Website: glossier.com

Glossier is an American beauty company founded by Emily Weiss in 2014. It originated as an online-only business, building on Weiss's beauty blog, Into the Gloss. Later, it expanded into pop-up shops and retail locations. It distributes its products through its website, select retail locations, and stores such as Sephora, SpaceNK, and Mecca.

== History ==
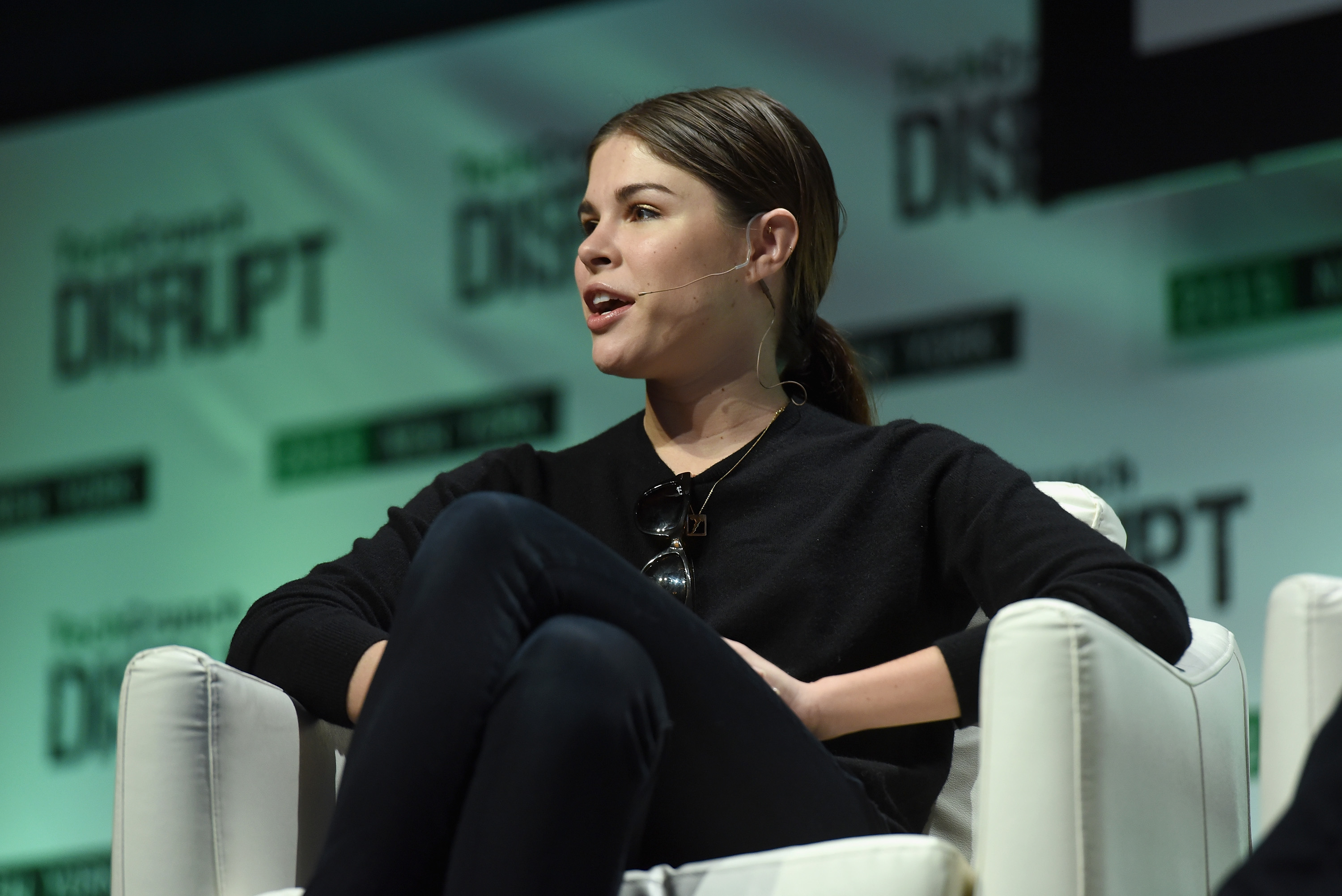
Emily Weiss

Emily Weiss began her career in the fashion industry and gained recognition through her blog Into the Gloss while working at Vogue. She founded Glossier in 2014 and initially launched four products: an all-purpose balm, a facial mist, a sheer skin tint, and a moisturizer. The company later expanded its product line to include serums, masks, shower gels, body lotions, fragrances, lip balms, and lipsticks.

Glossier raised $2 million in seed funding from Forerunner Ventures and later raised an additional $150 million in 2018 and 2019, valuing the company at $1.2 billion. In 2018, Glossier opened its first permanent in-person retail location in New York. In 2019, Glossier introduced a clothing and accessories line called GlossiWEAR, with limited edition items. A more colorful line of cosmetics called Glossier Play launched in 2019, but was discontinued a year later.

Emily Weiss stepped down as CEO in May 2022 but remained on the board as executive chairwoman. Kyle Leahy, the former chief commercial officer, became CEO, and as of October 2025, Colin Walsh is CEO.

In February 2026, Glossier laid off approximately 54 employees, representing about one-third of its workforce, as part of a strategic reset under new leadership to improve profitability. These cuts aimed to streamline operations and refocus the brand on its core business, following previous major restructuring efforts in 2022 and 2020. The company, once valued at over $1 billion, has transitioned from a direct-to-consumer-only model to a more hybrid, wholesale-friendly approach.

In March 2026, it was announced that over the next two years and half years, nine of Glossier's twelve retail stores will be closing, leaving the New York, Los Angeles and London locations.

== Reception ==
Glossier's products are popular among Millennials and Gen Z, who value the natural products and the aesthetic stores. Several Glossier products, including the "Boy Brow" eyebrow gel and the "Balm DotCom" lip balm have a "cult-like following".

Glossier faced criticism for the unsustainable packaging of its Play line. The line shut down a year later.

Glossier has established partnerships with the WNBA in 2020 and USA Basketball in 2024.

Individual products have received beauty awards from fashion magazines, including a number from Allure.
