= Daily News Record =

American fashion trade journal

- Type: Weekly
- Owner: Advance Publications
- Publisher: Jay Spaleta
- Founded: 1892
- Ceased publication: 2008
- Circulation: 15,804 weekly
- Website: dnrnews.com

Daily News Record (or DNR) was an American fashion trade journal published by Fairchild Publications, Inc. DNR started in 1890 when Edmund Fairchild used the wealth he had accumulated selling soap to purchase the Chicago Herald Gazette, a newspaper which focused on the men’s clothing business. Along with his brother Luis, Fairchild published a mimeographed paper which they called the Daily Trade Record and distributed at the 1893 Chicago World's Fair.

The paper was so successful that the pair decided to continue publication even after the fair finished. It acquired its current name some time later, and included a small feature about women’s wear. In July, 1910, this feature was split from the paper, and given its own publication that is today Women's Wear Daily.

In 1999, the parent company of the DNR, Fairchild Publications, Inc. was acquired by Condé Nast Publications after briefly being owned by The Walt Disney Company (which had acquired when it purchased Capital Cities Communications).

DNR folded in 2008. The staff was told of DNR's folding at an afternoon meeting on November 20, 2008, by editor in chief John Birmingham. Its men's fashion coverage was absorbed into Women's Wear Daily and is featured every week.
