= 1 William Street (New York City) =

Office building in Manhattan, New York

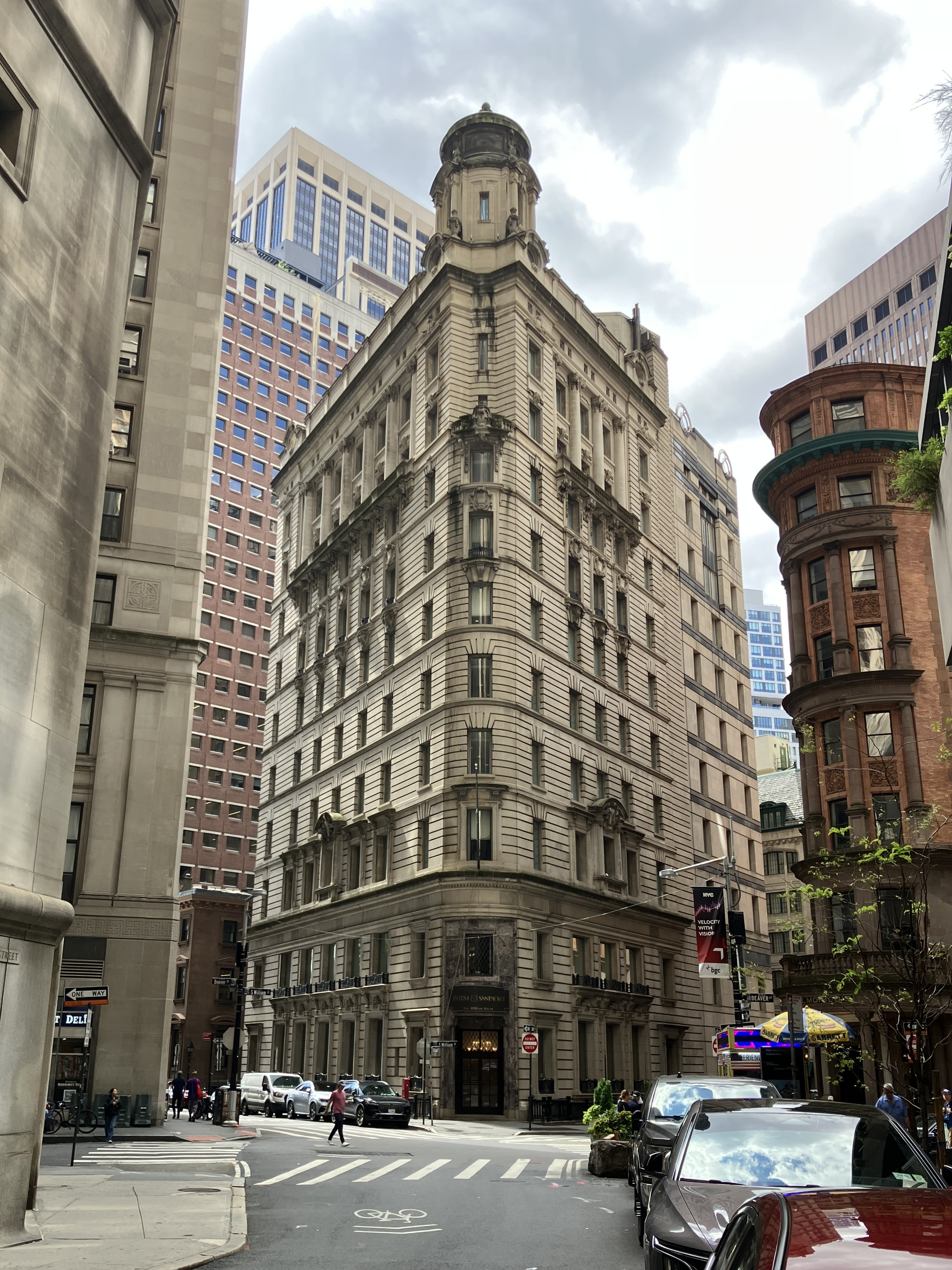
- 1 William Street in 2026
- Interactive map of the 1 William Street area
- Former names: J. & W. Seligman & Company Building; Lehman Brothers Building

General information
- Architectural style: Renaissance Revival
- Location: Lower Manhattan, New York City
- Coordinates: 40.7048°N 74.0100°W
- Construction started: 1906
- Completed: 1907

Height
- Height: 157 feet (48 m)

Technical details
- Floor count: 11

Design and construction
- Architects: Francis Kimball; Julian Clarence Levi
- Main contractor: George A. Fuller Company

New York City Landmark
- Designated: February 13, 1996
- Reference no.: 1943

U.S. Historic district – Contributing property
- Designated: February 20, 2007
- Part of: Wall Street Historic District
- Reference no.: 07000063

1 William Street (formerly the J. & W. Seligman & Company Building and the Lehman Brothers Building; also the Banca Commerciale Italiana Building) is an office building in the Financial District of Lower Manhattan in New York City. The building was erected in 1906–1907 and was designed by Francis H. Kimball in conjunction with Julian Clarence Levi. It was created for the Seligmans, a prominent German Jewish family who founded an investment bank called J. & W. Seligman. From 1929 to 1980, the building was the headquarters of investment bank Lehman Brothers, and was subsequently bought by Banca Commerciale Italiana.

The 11-story structure, clad in limestone with a steel frame, is located at the southern corner of the five-pointed intersection of William, South William, and Beaver Streets. It occupies a quadrilateral lot, with an acute angle between South William Street to the west and William Street to the east. In 1996, the building was designated as a landmark by the New York City Landmarks Preservation Commission. In 2007, the building was designated as a contributing property to the Wall Street Historic District, a National Register of Historic Places district.

== History ==
=== Context and construction ===
The Bavarian-born brothers Joseph and James Seligman, in conjunction with several other brothers, founded dry-goods businesses across the United States in the 1840s. They opened a New York City clothing store at 5 William Street by 1848. With profits from the creation of other branches worldwide, the family received contracts to create Union Army soldiers' uniforms during the American Civil War. After the war ended, the family founded an investment bank called J. & W. Seligman & Co., with headquarters at 59 Exchange Place. The company also developed branches around the world, each headed by one of the brothers, though these branches later became independent.

In March 1905, The New York Times reported that Isaac Seligman bought the lots on the south side of William Street from Stone to South William Streets. The five lots purchased by Isaac included the Seligmans' old store, and were two blocks away from Wall Street, where many of New York City's major financial companies and commodities exchanges were located. The next year, architectural plans for the building were filed with the New York City Department of Buildings. The New York Herald said, "It is to be of the Italian Renaissance type with facades of granite [sic] at the first story and limestone above, with decorative tower." Construction started in May 1906, with work on the foundation beginning the next month. The building was completed by July 1907 at a cost of $1 million, at which point J. & W. Seligman & Co. moved into the space. Originally, the front entrance was on South William Street.

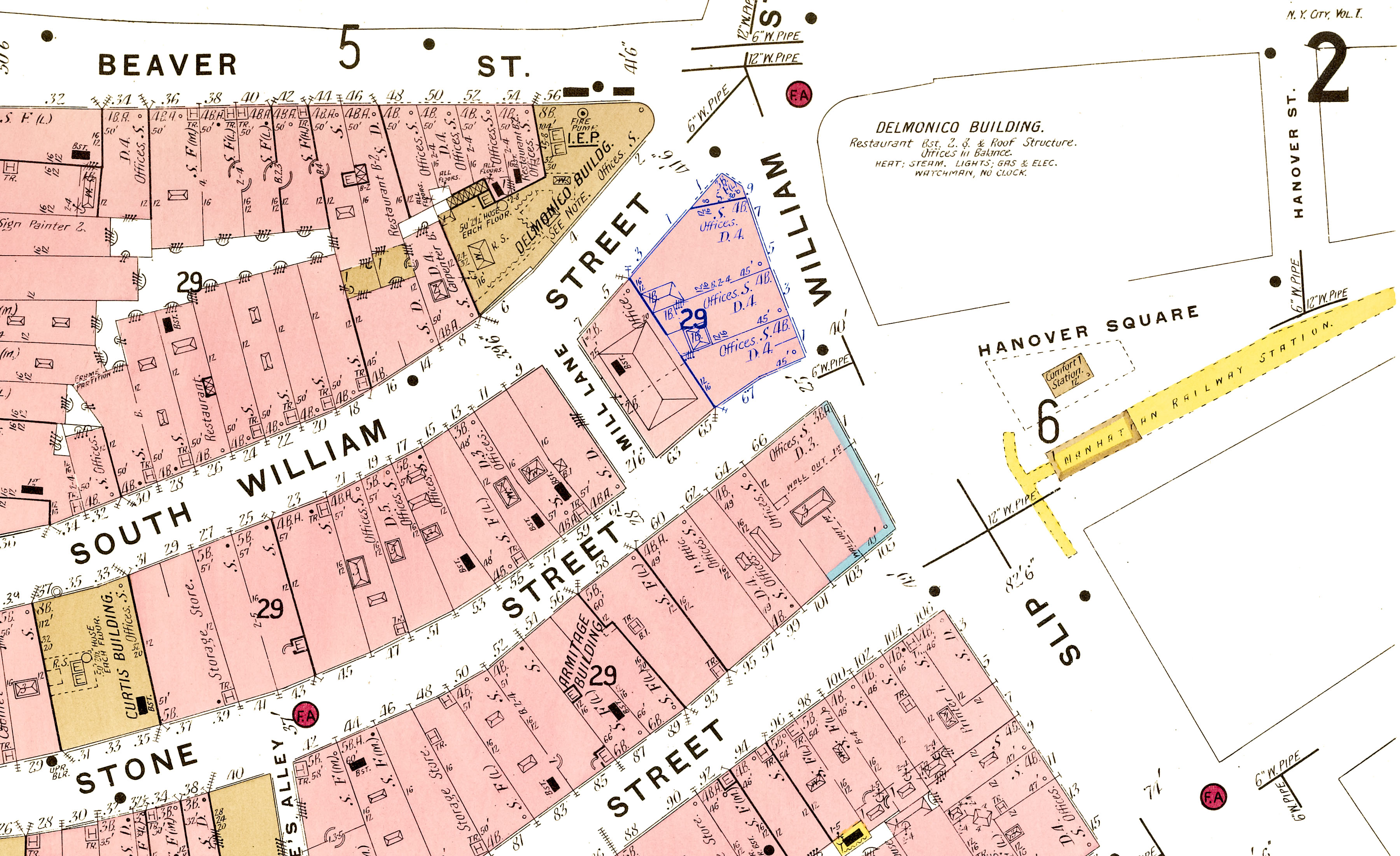
Location of lots (here outlined in blue) on which Seligman Building was constructed, from a Sanborn fire insurance map published in 1905.

1 William Street, like other contemporary tall buildings nearby, rests on concrete piers sunk using pneumatic caissons and cofferdams down to the bedrock (here about 43–47 feet (13–14 m) below curb level). The foundations for the walls formed a concrete dam 6 feet (1.8 m) wide and 30–40 feet (9.1–12.2 m) feet deep, which prevented water from entering the cellar dug out within it. Harper's Weekly reported in 1910 that during excavation of one of the caissons, an iridescent glass carafe or decanter of Dutch design had been found at a depth of 45 feet (14 m).

=== Use ===
In 1919, when Seligman & Co. relocated to nearby 54 Wall Street, 1 William Street was purchased by marine insurers Wilcox, Peck & Hughes (who were already tenants in the building). The same year, a renovation had split the two-story-high banking room into two regular-sized floors. By 1928, two floors of the building were occupied by insurance company Chubb & Son, which since 1892 had owned the adjacent premises at 5–7 South William Street (rebuilt to a design by Carrère and Hastings in 1899–1900).

The investment bank Lehman Brothers bought 1 William Street in 1928. At the time, they were located diagonally across the intersection of Beaver, William, and South William Streets. The firm had to move to make way for construction of 20 Exchange Place, and chose 1 William Street because it would provide more space. Lehman Brothers performed a $500,000 renovation of the structure, which included the relocation of the front entrance from South William Street to the corner with William and Beaver Street, as well as the replacement of the South William Street entrance with windows. Lehman Brothers moved into their offices at 1 William Street in June 1929. Lehman Brothers originally took half the floor area in 1 William Street, but then occupied additional space vacated by tenants with expiring leases, as well as space in two adjacent buildings.

By the 1970s, Lehman Brothers was seeing financial losses, and under chairman Peter G. Petersen, the company merged with Kuhn, Loeb & Co. in 1977. The combined company moved out of the building at the end of 1980, putting the structure on sale for $10 million and consolidating its operations at another facility on 55 Water Street. The following year, the building was purchased by Banca Commerciale Italiana, which erected an 11-story addition to the south between 1982 and 1986. Designed by Italian architect Gino Valle, the annex is faced in limestone like the original structure, with the addition of black granite courses. In 1988, it received an Albert S. Bard Award for Excellence in Architecture and Urban Design from the City Club of New York.

Through a series of mergers in the Italian banking industry, the building has been owned since 2008 by Intesa Sanpaolo, (Note: A list of the property's owners since 1971 can be found via the Office of the City Register, New York City Department of Finance (search for Manhattan block 29 lot 36).) Italy's largest bank.

== Description ==
The building is designed in the Renaissance Revival style, with elements similar to the Baroque Revival style in Britain, such as a curving exterior, sculptural ornament, and towers at the corners. It was not well received by the Architectural Record, in which Montgomery Schuyler described it as "a rather frightful example of the unwisdom of trying to variegate and diversify the accepted type of skyscraper, especially by an architect whose work indicates that his forte lies much rather in conformity than in innovation". However, many considered it to be the most handsome building on Hanover Square.

=== Exterior ===
The side facades have a granite water table. The windows on the ground floor contain elaborate entablatures on their frames, while those on the second floor are rectangular with ornate metal railings. On the third through eighth stories, the windows are rectangular with lintels containing voussoirs. A colonnade runs along the facade of the ninth and tenth floors, and the eleventh floor contains square windows. There are water towers on the roof and a chimney on the South William Street side.

To smooth out the acute angle created by the intersection of William and South William Streets, where the building's main entrance is located, the designers included a curved facade at the lower floors, as well as a concave building corner element above the eighth floor. This element is capped by a corner tower, which is round and resembles a "tempietto". The doorway contains double doors made of glass and metal, as well as iron gates, a short flight of granite steps, a flagpole around the doors, a metal plaque, and decorative iron grilles on the transom and second story. The third through eighth floors on this section are rounded, and above the eighth-floor window is a sculpted cartouche.

The South William Street side contained the original front doorway for the building, which comprised a door underneath an arch with glass screen. The magazine New York Architect characterized the building as being "the most complete private banking institution in the city", with a form and sculptural elements that provide a maximum "breadth and solidity in the treatment of the exterior."

Studio Architetti Valle, along with Fred Liebmann and Jeremy P. Lang Architects, designed an 11-story annex in 1982. The annex, located south of the original building, contains black granite and limestone cladding, as well as a turret at the southern corner, which complements the other turret at the entrance of the original building. The annex features double doors facing South William Street, as well as a service entrance at Stone Street.

=== Interior ===
Upon the building's completion, the basement, ground floor, and mezzanine housed the banking offices, and there was a "richly decorated" board room on the mezzanine, as per the company's requirements. The two-story banking room included a barrel-vaulted ceiling and was split into two floors by 1919. The basement and first two floors were ventilated by a supply and exhaust fan unit. In 1914, improvements were made to the building's lighting which reportedly had a transformative effect on its ambiance.

When Lehman Brothers occupied 1 William Street, it maintained a fancy private dining facility for its employees in the building. In 1979 The New York Times deemed 1 William Street's lunchroom as the best corporate lunchroom in the Wall Street area, saying, "Perhaps nowhere on Wall Street is the food as good and Old World dining carried on with the same care and flair." At the time, chef Pierre Colin prepared 75 meals a day for lunch. Colin said that the dinners were "much more elegant than eating at a midtown restaurant". During dinners, hors d'oeuvres were served on the third floor before guests moved to the eighth-floor Partners' Dining Room, which contained a table made of mahogany wood and silver inlays; Hepplewhite-brand chairs; linen napkins; crystal and china cutlery; oil paintings on the walls; and windows with slight views of the nearby East River. After Banca Commerciale Italiana took over the building, the original decor remained, but the dining facilities served "only Italian food and wine".

== See also ==
- List of New York City Designated Landmarks in Manhattan below 14th Street
