= Footwear News =

Weekly print publication on footwear

- May 4, 2020 issue highlighting Footwear News's 75th anniversary
- Editorial Director: Michael Atmore
- Founded: 1945
- Company: Penske Media Corporation
- Country: USA
- Based in: New York City (475 Fifth Ave 3rd Floor New York, NY 10017)
- Website: footwearnews.com

Footwear News (sometimes referred to as FN) is a weekly print publication on the topic of women's, men's, and children's footwear. Founded in 1945, its coverage is for the fashion design and fashion retail industries. It was originally published by Fairchild Media. The publication also operates FootwearNews.com which runs more consumer content than the print publication.

The publication hosts the annual FN Achievement Awards, which has been referred to as the "Shoe Oscars." It also hosts the FN CEO Summit, an event with footwear industry CEOs, designers, and brand builders.

Footwear News was owned by Condé Nast and operated under the Fairchild Media brand. It became a part of Penske Media Corporation when the company purchased Fairchild Media for $100 million in 2014.
