= Fairchild Fashion Media =

American publishing company

Fairchild Media
- Type: Subsidiary
- Industry: Media & Events
- Founded: 1892; 134 years ago
- Founder: Edmund Fairchild and Louis E. Fairchild
- Headquarters: New York City (475 Fifth Ave 3rd Floor New York, NY 10017)
- Products: Websites, Magazines
- Parent: Capital Cities Communications (1968–1996); The Walt Disney Company (1996–1999); Advance Publications (1999–2014); Penske Media Corporation (2014–present)
- Website: www.pmc.com

Fairchild Media is a publisher of digital media, journalism, photography and design, events and summits, video and studios, and fashion. Fairchild Media brands include Women’s Wear Daily, Footwear News (FN), Beauty Inc, M and Fairchild Summits. Fairchild Media is a division of Penske Media Corporation, and is a source of fashion news and analysis for industry leaders and the global fashion community.

== History ==
Fairchild Publications was founded in 1892 when Edmund Fairchild, a peddler, took over the Daily Trade Record (later the Daily News Record and DNR), a failing newspaper that covered the men's clothing business. In June 1910, an insert called "Women's Wear" first appeared in the Record; a month later, Fairchild published it as a standalone publication, known today as Women's Wear Daily. John Fairchild, grandson of Edmund Fairchild assumed management of Women’s Wear Daily in 1955 and transformed it from a trade journal to a fashion and cultural newspaper.

Women's Wear insert, June 1910

In 1968, the company—then named Fairchild Publications—was purchased by Capital Cities Communications. In 1996, The Walt Disney Company acquired Capital Cities/ABC. In 1997, Disney announced its intention to sell Fairchild, but it wasn't until 1999 that it sold Fairchild to Advance Publications, the parent company of Condé Nast Publications, for $650 million.

In 2005, Advance Publications folded Fairchild into Condé Nast Publications and rebranded the division as the Fairchild Fashion Group. In 2008, it folded DNR.

In 2010, Fairchild launched Menswear and took over the consumer-centric Style.com, previously part of Condé Nast Publications. In 2011, Fairchild Fashion Group was renamed Fairchild Fashion Media; in October of that year, FFM launched Style.com/Print, a print magazine extension of the brand. In 2012, FFM sold its Fairchild Books division to Bloomsbury Publishing for $6.5 million. The same year, it acquired Fashion Networks International, a blog network founded by swedish entrepreneur Christian Remröd, with contributors that included Anna Dello Russo, Bryanboy, Rumi Neely, and Derek Blasberg.

In August 2014, Advance Publications announced that it would sell FFM, save for Style.com and NowManifest, to Penske Media Corp. for $100 million.

== Publications ==
Over the years, the company's portfolio has included the following publications:

- American Metal Market
- Beauty Inc.
- Details
- Electronic News
- Footwear News
- Golf Pro Merchandising
- Home Furnishings Daily
- Jane
- M (1983-1992; 2012–present)
- Men'sWeek
- Metalworking News
- Style.com
- Style.com/Print
- Supermarket News
- SportStyle
- Children's Business
