= Women's Wear Daily =

Fashion-industry trade journal

- Cover of December 13, 2024 issue
- Type: Online publication
- Format: Magazine
- Owner: Penske Media Corporation
- Editor-in-chief: Michael Atmore
- Founded: July 13, 1910; 116 years ago
- Headquarters: 475 Fifth Ave. 3rd Floor New York, NY 10017
- ISSN: 0043-7581
- Website: wwd.com

Women's Wear Daily (also known as WWD) is a fashion-industry trade journal often referred to as the "Bible of fashion". It provides information and intelligence on changing trends and breaking news in the men's and women's fashion, beauty, and retail industries. Its readership is made up largely of retailers, designers, manufacturers, marketers, financiers, media executives, advertising agencies, socialites, and trend makers.

WWD is the flagship publication of Fairchild Media, which is owned by Penske Media Corporation. In April 2015, the paper switched from a daily print format to a weekly print format, accompanied by a daily digital edition. In 2017, it announced it would ramp up its focus on digital, reducing its regular print schedule further and opting instead to publish print issues only during fashion weeks and certain other events.

== History ==
=== Founding and John Fairchild ===
WWD was founded by Edmund Fairchild on July 13, 1910, as an outgrowth of the menswear journal Daily News Record. The publication quickly acquired a firm standing in the New York clothing industry, due to the influence of its first advertisers. Edith Rosenbaum Russell served as Women's Wear Daily's first Paris correspondent. Reporters for the publication were sometimes assigned to the last row of couture shows, but the publication gained popularity by the late 1950s.

John B. Fairchild, who became the European bureau chief of Fairchild Publications in 1955 and the publisher of WWD in 1960, improved WWD's standing by focusing on the human side of fashion. He turned his newspaper's attention to the social scene of fashion designers and their clients, and helped manufacture a "cult of celebrity" around designers. Fairchild also played hardball to help his circulation. After two couturiers forbade press coverage until one month after buyers had seen their clothes, Fairchild published photos and sketches anyway. He even sent reporters to fashion houses disguised as messengers, or had them observe designers' new styles from windows of buildings opposite fashion houses. "I have learned in fashion to be a little savage", he wrote in his memoir. Fairchild was publisher of the magazine from 1960 to 1996.

Under Fairchild, the company's feuds were also legendary. When a designer's statements or work offended Fairchild, he would retaliate, sometimes banning any reference to them in his newspaper for years at a stretch. The newspaper famously sparred with Hubert de Givenchy, Cristóbal Balenciaga, John Weitz, Azzedine Alaia, Perry Ellis, Yves Saint Laurent, Giorgio Armani, Bill Blass, Geoffrey Beene (four times – the first over Lynda Bird Johnson's White House wedding dress design which Beene promised to keep secret until the wedding day, and later over the size of an ad in another of Fairchild's publications; Beene's allowing a rival publication to photograph his home; and a WWD reporter Beene did not like), James Galanos, Mollie Parnis, Oscar de la Renta, and Norman Norell (who was demoted from "Fashion Great" to "Old Master" in the journal's pages), among others. In response, some designers forbade their representatives from speaking to WWD reporters or disinviting WWD reporters from their fashion shows. In general, though, those excluded "kept their mouths shut and [took] it on the chin." When designer Pauline Trigère, who had been excluded from the paper for three years, took out a full-page advertisement protesting the ban in the fashion section of a 1988 New York Times Magazine, it was believed to be the first widely distributed counterattack on Fairchild's policy.

=== 1999 to 2013: Condé Nast Publications ===
In 1999, Fairchild Publications was sold by the Walt Disney Company to Advance Publications, the parent company of Condé Nast Publications. As a result, Fairchild Publications became a unit of Condé Nast, though WWD was technically operated separately from Condé Nast's consumer publications such as Vogue and Glamour.

In November 2010, WWD celebrated its 100th anniversary at the Cipriani in New York, with some of the fashion industry's leading experts including designers Alber Elbaz, Ralph Lauren, Marc Jacobs and Michael Kors.

=== 2014 to present: Penske Media Corporation ===
On August 19, 2014, Conde Nast sold Women's Wear Daily to Penske Media Corporation (PMC). The purchase by PMC included WWD's sister publications Footwear News, Menswear, M Magazine, and Beauty Inc as well as Fairchild's events business for a sale price close to $100 million.

On April 12, 2015, WWD announced on their website that they would launch a weekly print format from April 23 on. A daily digital edition of WWD is also available to subscribers.

On July 20, 2015, Penske Media Corporation (PMC) and Tribune Publishing Company announced that WWD would appear on "LATimes.com" and would also be distributed to select Los Angeles Times, The San Diego Union-Tribune, Chicago Tribune and Sun Sentinel subscribers 12 times per year.

== Editions ==
Country	Circulation Dates	Editor-in-Chief	Start year	End year	Ref.
United States (WWD / Women's Wear Daily)	1910–present	John Fairchild	1964		
United States (WWD / Women's Wear Daily)	1910–present	Michael Coady	1970		
United States (WWD / Women's Wear Daily)	1910–present	Ed Nardoza	1991	2017	
United States (WWD / Women's Wear Daily)	1910–present	Miles Socha	2017	2023	
United States (WWD / Women's Wear Daily)	1910–present	Eugenia Richman	2024	2025	
United States (WWD / Women's Wear Daily)	1910–present	Michael Atmore	2025	present	
Japan (WWD Japan)	1979–present	Akira Miura (三浦彰)	1994		
Japan (WWD Japan)	1979–present	Kazuyuki Yamamuro	2006	2013	
Japan (WWD Japan)	1979–present	Chika Tsuzuki	2013	2015	
Japan (WWD Japan)	1979–present	Chizuru Muko	2015	2021	
Japan (WWD Japan)	1979–present	Kaname Murakami	2021	present	
China (WWD China / 国际时尚特讯)	2019–present				
South Korea (WWD Korea)	2019–present	Reese Kim	2019		
Thailand (WWD Thailand)	2025–present	Sethapong Pawwattana	2025	present	
