= Manhattan House =

Residential building in Manhattan, New York

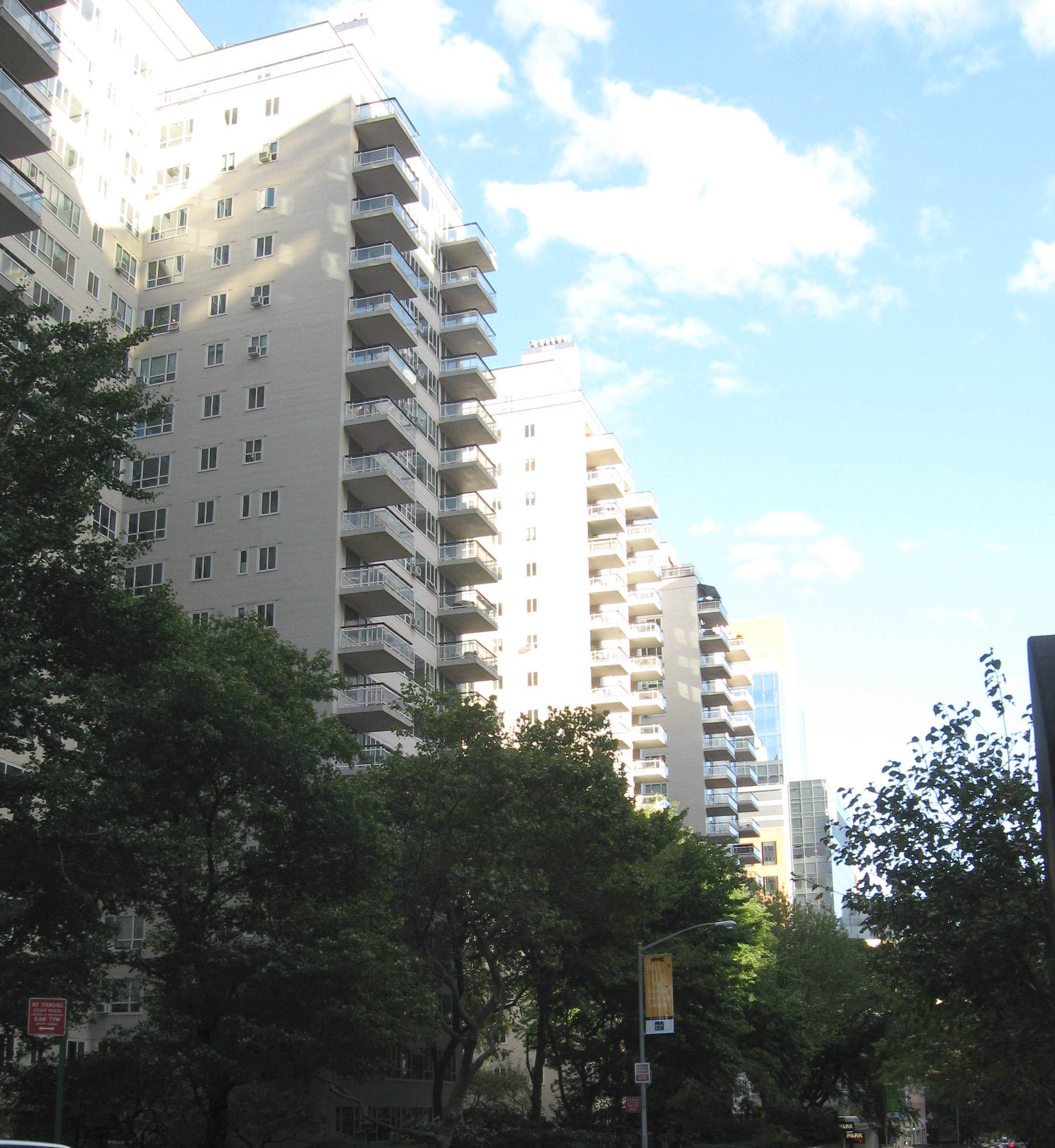
- Seen from Third Avenue and 65th Street
- Interactive map of the Manhattan House area

General information
- Type: Condominiums (mixed residential and commercial)
- Location: 200 East 66th Street; Manhattan, New York, United States
- Coordinates: 40°45′55″N 73°57′46″W
- Groundbreaking: April 1949
- Construction started: 1950
- Completed: 1951
- Client: New York Life Insurance Company

Technical details
- Structural system: Concrete slab
- Floor count: 21

Design and construction
- Architects: Gordon Bunshaft of Skidmore, Owings & Merrill; Albert Mayer and Julian Whittlesey of Mayer & Whittlesey
- Engineer: Richard T. Geoghegan

Other information
- Number of units: 582 (original)

New York City Landmark
- Designated: October 30, 2007
- Reference no.: 2246

Manhattan House is a 21-story residential condominium building at 200 East 66th Street on the Upper East Side of Manhattan in New York City, New York, United States. The building was designed in the modern style by Gordon Bunshaft of Skidmore, Owings & Merrill (SOM), in partnership with the firm of Albert Mayer and Julian Whittlesey. It occupies a full city block bounded by Third Avenue to the west, 66th Street to the north, Second Avenue to the east, and 65th Street to the south. Constructed between 1949 and 1951, Manhattan House was developed by the New York Life Insurance Company as a middle-class apartment building. The complex is a New York City designated landmark.

Manhattan House consists of a central "spine" with five wings each facing north and south, as well as low-rise retail podiums to the west and east. The structure is set back from both 65th and 66th Streets and only occupies about two-fifths of the lot. To allow the construction of a tall structure with fewer setbacks, New York Life donated the northern part of the site to the New York City government, and it placed a garden on the southern part. The facade is made of pale white brick. The main entrances are on the north side of the building, facing 66th Street, while there are various storefronts on Second and Third Avenues. Manhattan House contains a lobby with glass walls, as well as a basement parking garage and a roof garden. The upper stories were originally divided into five sections and contained approximately 582 apartments, each with two to seven rooms. Most of the apartments contained glass balconies, and some of the apartments included fireplaces.

The structure was built on the site of a 19th-century car barn, which New York Life had acquired in 1946. After various delays, New York Life began constructing the building in April 1949, and the first residents moved into Manhattan House in October 1950. Throughout the mid- and late 20th century, New York Life operated Manhattan House, renting apartments to largely middle-class tenants; its residents included Bunshaft, clarinetist Benny Goodman, and actress and later Princess of Monaco Grace Kelly. New York Life sold the building in 2005 to developer N. Richard Kalikow and investor Jeremiah W. O'Connor Jr., who converted the apartments into condominiums. The conversion project was delayed by numerous lawsuits, complaints from existing tenants, and the 2008 financial crisis. O'Connor ultimately completed the project by himself at a cost of $1.1 billion, making it one of the most expensive condominium conversions in New York City; the last condos were sold in 2015.

== Site ==
Manhattan House is located at 200 East 66th Street on the Upper East Side of Manhattan in New York City, New York, United States. It occupies a city block bounded by Third Avenue to the west, 66th Street to the north, Second Avenue to the east, and 65th Street to the south. The land lot is rectangular and covers 98,108 ft^{2} (9,115 m^{2}), with a frontage of about 160.83 ft (49 m) on either avenue and about 610 ft (186 m) on either street. The land lot originally measured 200 ft (61 m) wide, but the building's developer, the New York Life Insurance Company, had donated a 40 ft-wide (12 m) strip of land along 66th Street to the government of New York City prior to Manhattan House's construction. This allowed the city to widen the adjacent block of 66th Street from 60 to 100 ft (18 to 30 m), with separate roadways for through traffic and local traffic. Plane trees were planted on both sides of 66th Street and in the median; a wall of granite blocks separates the two roadways. The site slopes down to the east, so the Second Avenue end of the building is 18 ft (5.5 m) lower than the Third Avenue end.

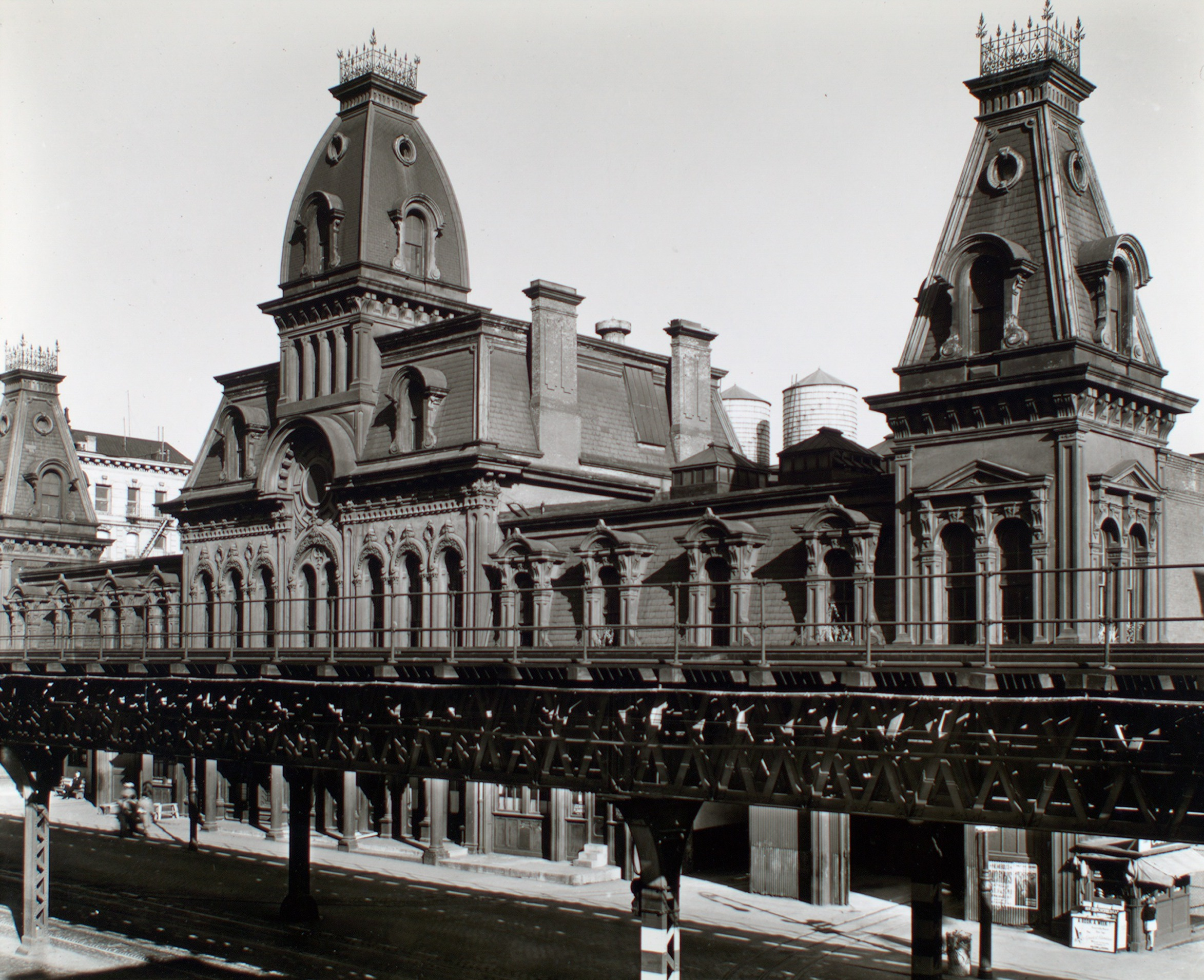
Manhattan House replaced the Third Avenue Car Barn (Third Avenue EL in foreground, 1936).

Prior to the construction of Manhattan House, the site had been occupied by a car barn for trolleys and horse-drawn cars, which had been constructed in the 1860s. The Second Avenue and Third Avenue elevated railway lines of the New York City Subway had been constructed in the 1880s, significantly lowering land values in the area between these lines. The car barn, which was designed in either the Italianate or French Second Empire styles, was renovated in the 1890s to designs by Henry Janeway Hardenbergh. The Second Avenue Elevated had been demolished by 1942, and the Third Avenue Elevated followed soon afterward, prompting a revival of the surrounding area.

In conjunction with Manhattan House's construction, New York Life also acquired property on all four sides of the building. The company acquired ten low-rise apartment buildings at 205–227 East 66th Street immediately to the north, then hired Carlisle H. Johnson to redesign the buildings in a modern style in 1951, with gray-green brick and continuous design details. The structures on 66th Street served as a "protective buffer", preserving views for residents of Manhattan House. New York Life also hired Fellheimer & Wagner to design a two-story structure on the east side of Second Avenue between 65th and 66th Streets, which contained the Beekman Theatre and two banks. New York Life had leased the block to the south with plans to build a parking garage and public park there, but the garage and park were never built, and the company ultimately took over the remaining structures on the site in 1958. Finally, the insurance company bought a pair of tenement houses to the west, at 1116 and 1118 Third Avenue, but was unable to acquire additional property on either side of the tenements. New York Life sold off all of these sites to developers between 1960 and 1996.

== Architecture ==
Manhattan House was designed in the modernist style by Gordon Bunshaft of architectural firm Skidmore, Owings & Merrill (SOM), in partnership with the firm Mayer & Whittlesey, composed of Albert Mayer and Julian Whittlesey. Bunshaft, the project's lead architect, expressed doubts about the extent of Mayer & Whittlesey's involvement in the project, claiming that New York Life was not "excited about their kind of architecture". Bunshaft's claim conflicts with the fact that Manhattan House has many architectural features in common with Mayer & Whittlesey's design with 40 Central Park South; furthermore, New York Life had acquired the site on Mayer & Whittlesey's recommendation. Cauldwell-Wingate Company was the general contractor for the project. Chief construction engineer Richard Geoghegan; mechanical engineer Jaros, Baum & Bolles; and elevator manufacturer Otis Elevator were also involved in the building's construction.

=== Form ===
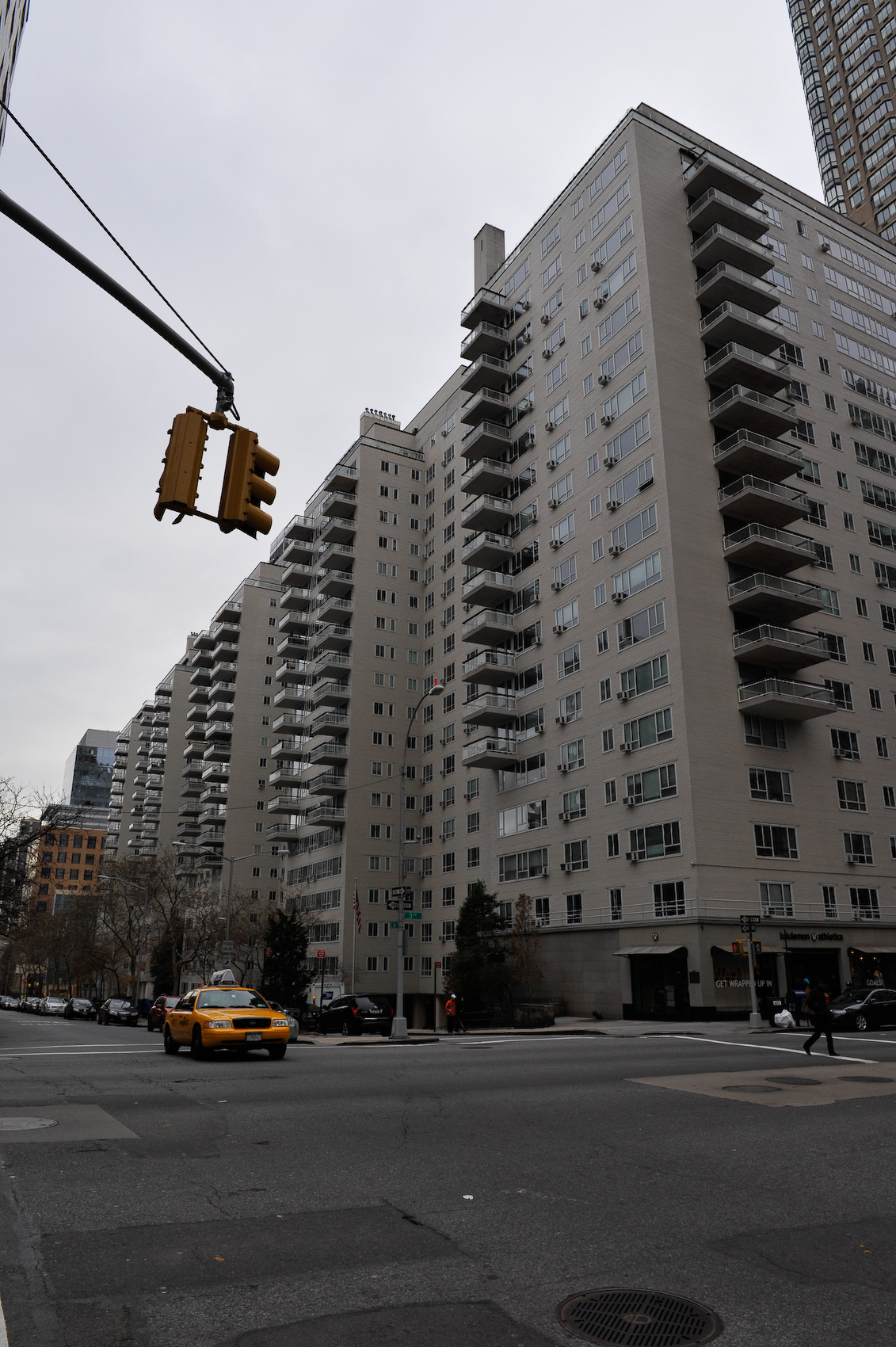
Manhattan House as seen from across the intersection of Third Avenue and 66th Street

Manhattan House is a 21-story structure measuring 256 ft (78 m) tall. The building occupies the center of the block between 65th and 66th Street and only covers about two-fifths of the lot. The structure measures 591 ft (180 m) long from west to east. It is set back from both 65th and 66th Streets, with a garden on 65th Street and planted areas on 66th Streets. This contrasted with older apartment buildings in New York City, where the exterior facades extended to the lot line and the gardens were placed within the building's interior. The building is divided into five sections from west to east. Each section consists of two wings that extend outward from a central "spine", which provided natural light to each apartment without the need for light courts; there are ten wings in total. The New York City Landmarks Preservation Commission (LPC) described the floor plan as an elongated "H", while Architectural Forum and the historian Carol Herselle Krinsky characterized the layout as resembling three connected "+" symbols with a "T" at either end.

The building is flanked by low-rise retail podiums to the west and east; each of the podiums is 12 ft (3.7 m) high, and there is a setback above each podium. At the time of Manhattan House's construction, the 1916 Zoning Resolution mandated the inclusion of setbacks on buildings in New York City based on the height of the adjoining street. To allow the construction of a taller structure with fewer setbacks, New York Life had donated the northernmost 40 feet of the site to the city government, which widened the adjacent segment of 66th Street. (Note: In particular, a structure on Manhattan House's site can rise one-and-a-half times the height of the neighboring street before the first setback, assuming that the building is placed directly on the lot line. Second Avenue, 66th Street, and Third Avenue are wide enough to allow Manhattan House to rise 18 stories before its first setback. On 65th Street, the first floor is recessed deeply from the lot line.) As such, the building rises as a continuous slab to the 18th story; only the penthouses on the 19th and 20th stories are set back. This design also maximizes the amount of natural light that each apartment received, as the apartments are set back as far as possible from the buildings across the street.

Joanna Diman of SOM was credited with the design of both the garden on 65th Street and the plantings on 66th Street. The garden is surrounded by a low granite wall, enabling the public to view the garden while providing residents with privacy. The garden includes meandering stone paths, black light poles, and a white-brick ventilation shaft. At the time of the garden's completion, it was New York City's second-largest private garden behind Gramercy Park. When the building was converted to condominiums in the late 2000s, Sasaki Associates redesigned the garden. Two sculptures by Hans Van de Bovenkamp, known as Trinity and Red Gateway, were installed during the renovation.

=== Facade ===
The facade is made of white brick. Manhattan House was one of the first in New York City to use pale white brick as the primary material in its facade. When Manhattan House was built, the New York Herald Tribune described the building as the first large apartment house to use "full ceramic brick impervious to dirt and stain" on its facade. The brick was glazed, which allowed dirt to wash off in the rain. There are also yellow-brick chimneys atop each of the wings.

The main entrances to the apartments are placed on the north side of the building, facing 66th Street, within the second-outermost sections on either end. Each of the building's two main entrances consists of a driveway and sidewalk that curves underneath the building, which in turn leads to a set of glass-and-aluminum doors. There are curved light boxes next to the driveways, as well as recessed lights mounted onto pillars next to the driveways. In addition, there are planted areas with iron fences between either driveway and the street, as well as on either side of both entrances. To the east of the eastern entrance are a stairway and ramp leading to a doctor's office; a storefront facing Second Avenue; and a planting bed with granite-block walls topped by an iron fence. Next to the western entrance is a storefront facing Third Avenue, a granite planting bed, and an iron fence.

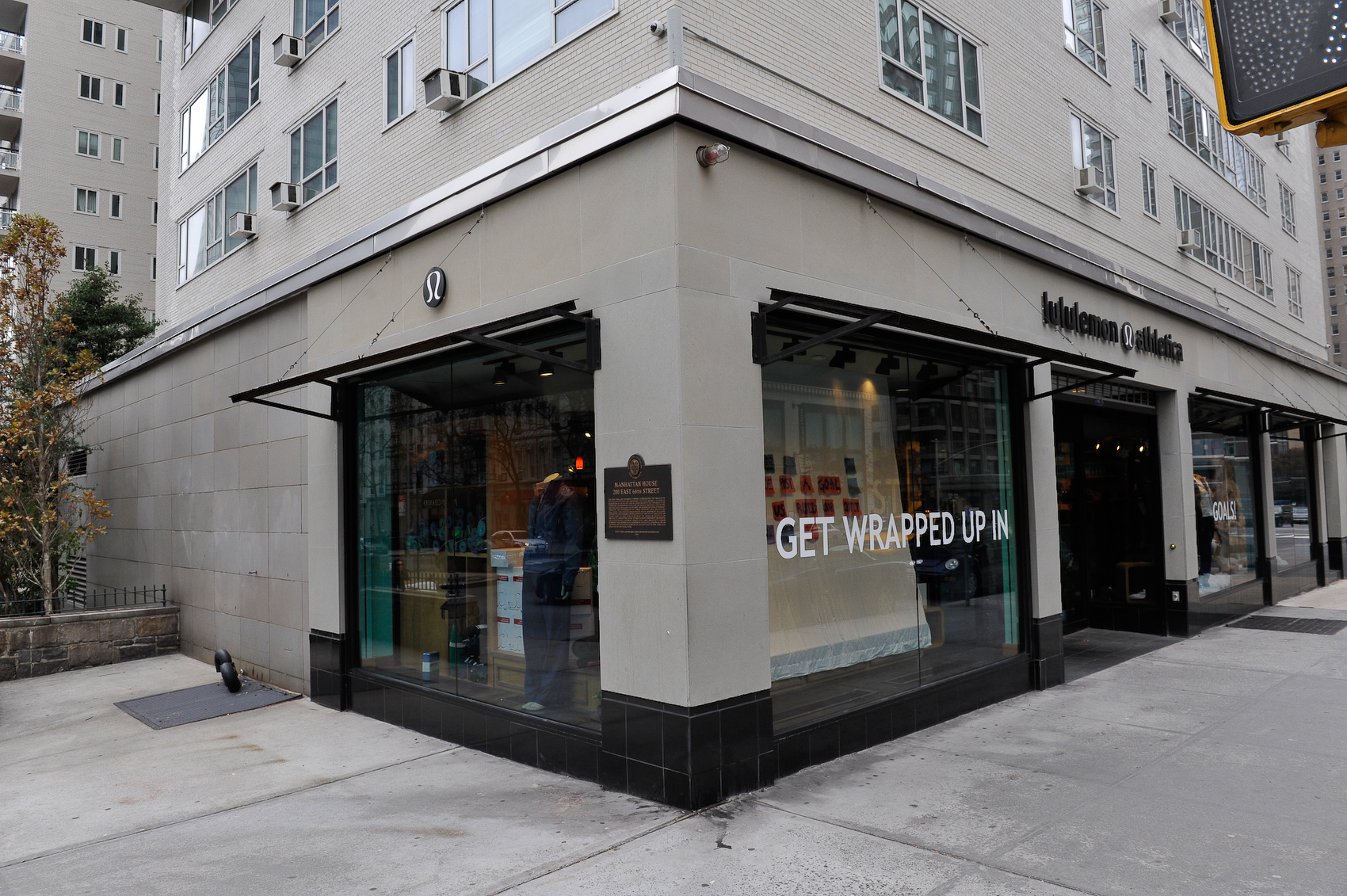
One of the storefronts on Third Avenue

The building contains several storefronts at street level, facing Second and Third Avenues. The storefronts on Second Avenue contain aluminum doorways and mullions, and the center of that frontage also includes glazed concrete panels. The loading docks and an entrance to the building's garage are on 65th Street near Second Avenue. A metal air-conditioning enclosure is placed on the roof of the garage. West of the garage's entrance, there is a granite-block wall topped by an iron fence; the height of this wall decreases as the site slopes upward toward Third Avenue. There is a metal gate at the center of this granite-block wall, which leads to the garden. There is a gate near the western end of the 65th Street elevation, which leads to a staircase that descends to a doctor's office on Third Avenue. The storefronts on Third Avenue, including a two-level restaurant at the corner with 65th Street, were modified at some point after the building was completed.

The residential floors were originally arranged with casement windows and ribbon windows, which one writer described as being 40 percent larger than average windows at the time. Each of the windows is placed about 1.5 in (38 mm) behind the outer surface of the brick wall; this was done to prevent water from dripping onto, and staining, the window sills. Above the fifth floor, apartments with at least three rooms contain private balconies, which adjoin the living or dining rooms of each unit. The balconies span the entire width of the living or dining rooms; there is also a window next to all bedrooms that are adjacent to a balcony. These balconies had an average area of 70 ft^{2} (6.5 m^{2}), measuring about 6.67 to 6.75 ft (2 to 2 m) deep and either 9 ft (2.7 m), 10.25 ft (3.1 m), or 13.67 ft (4.2 m) wide. Each of the balconies has glass railings, which were intended to reduce their visual impact. The balconies cost $750 each, (Note: Equivalent to $9,093 in 2025 (Note: 1634–1699: McCusker, J. J. (1997). How Much Is That in Real Money? A Historical Price Index for Use as a Deflator of Money Values in the Economy of the United States: Addenda et Corrigenda (PDF). American Antiquarian Society. 1700–1799: McCusker, J. J. (1992). How Much Is That in Real Money? A Historical Price Index for Use as a Deflator of Money Values in the Economy of the United States (PDF). American Antiquarian Society. 1800–present: Federal Reserve Bank of Minneapolis. "Consumer Price Index (estimate) 1800–".)) and apartments with balconies were generally rented out at higher rates than their counterparts without the feature.

=== Features ===
The exterior of Manhattan House resembles a continuous slab, but each of the building's five sections is physically separated to reduce the amount of space required for hallways. Only the basement, lobby, and roof of each section are connected to each other. There are elevators and stairs where each of the wings intersects the building's spine. The building was constructed with 15 elevators, arranged into five banks. Each bank contains one service elevator and two passenger elevators. These elevators were originally manually operated; most tenants chose to operate the elevators themselves, although they could also use a buzzer to summon an elevator operator.

When Manhattan House was completed, it was the largest structure in New York City to be made of reinforced concrete. The superstructure of the upper floors consists of flat concrete slabs without any exposed ceiling beams. The apartments contain column-free living spaces measuring 22 or 25 ft (6.7 or 7.6 m) across, (Note: Krinsky 1988, p. 14, cites both of these figures as being true, since the rooms measure 22 by 25 feet (6.7 m × 7.6 m) across.) larger than most living rooms of the time. Each apartment has a relatively low ceiling height of 9 ft (2.7 m), shorter than pre-war apartment buildings, which typically had ceiling heights of 10 ft (3.0 m). Structural beams were placed within the partition walls in each apartment, as well as just behind the exterior wall. Consequently, the exterior walls are extremely thick, and each apartment has a very deep window sill.

==== Lobby and amenity spaces ====
As planned in 1948, the first floor of the building was supposed to contain a lobby, a restaurant, doctors' offices, and seven apartments. As built, the ground level included several lobbies, a restaurant space, and 16,000 ft^{2} (1,500 m^{2}) of storefront space, as well as six doctors' offices. The Third Avenue side of the building contains 6,000 ft (1,800 m) of ground-level storefront space and 8,500 ft^{2} (790 m^{2}) of storefront space in the basement. At the southwest corner of the building was originally a 12,000 ft^{2} (1,100 m^{2}) Longchamps restaurant, which had 400 seats across two levels, in addition to an outdoor terrace. The terrace has largely been covered over, but much of the restaurant's western wall remains intact.

When the building was completed, it contained a 225-car garage in the basement, near Second Avenue. Originally, the garage was planned to have 175 parking spaces. The garage continues to operate in the 21st century. In addition, there were loading areas in the basement for delivery trucks and moving trucks, which entered and exited the building from 65th Street.

The lobby is on an intermediate level between the stores on Third Avenue, which are on a higher level, and the ground-level stores on Second Avenue, which are on a lower level. The lobby is divided into four sections, each with its own entrance and decorated in shades of green, gray, and brown. Manhattan House's lobby also contains glass walls on either side, facing the gardens, which could be slid open during periods of warm weather. It was one of the first apartment lobbies in New York City with glass walls on two sides, which allowed pedestrians to see through the lobby. According to a 1952 advertisement for contractor Atlas White Cement, the lobby contains 74 concrete columns. These columns are covered in cast stone cladding with space for heating risers; each column is clad with two U-shaped granite slabs measuring 11 ft (3.4 m) high and 2.5 in (64 mm) thick. The architects originally planned to install murals on the north and south walls of the lobby, but these plans were abandoned during construction.

When the building was converted to condominiums, one of the apartments was renovated into a playroom for residents' children, designed by Ohio-based design firm Roto. The top story contained a roof garden that spanned the building's length. The roof garden had glass walls facing north and south, as well as murals by Attilio Salemme. During the condo-conversion project, the roof garden was converted into a 10,000 ft^{2} (930 m^{2}) rooftop bar. During this project, a lounge called the Manhattan Club was created on the top floor, along with a spa, a gym, and outdoor terraces on the same floor.

==== Apartments ====
The original plans for the building called for 26 apartments on the second floor, 32 apartments on each of the third through nineteenth floors, and 18 apartments on the twentieth floor. The structure had been announced as a 582-unit building with a total of 2,486 rooms. As built, the structure had 581 apartments, with 2,524 rooms between them; this had increased to 583 apartments by the late 2000s. There was also an apartment for the building's superintendent. The building was constructed with 60 bedrooms for servants, of which 50 were placed inside individual apartments; the remaining 10 servants' bedrooms were grouped centrally. Each section contained at most six apartments per floor.

The majority of the apartments are illuminated from the south, but all the apartments on the north side of the building also have western or eastern exposures. Of the 32 units on a typical floor, 18 have an exposure on the south, and eight have exposures on both the north and south. In addition, 20 of the units on a typical floor occupy the building's corners and, thus, have exposures on the west and east. In total, 95 percent of apartments have cross ventilation. Each apartment contained between two and seven rooms, although the majority of apartments were built with three to five rooms. The building contained 480 apartments with between three and five rooms, consisting of 104 units with three rooms, 2 with three and a half rooms, 180 with four rooms, and 194 with five rooms. There were also 35 two-room apartments, 51 six-room apartments, and 15 seven-room apartments.

New York Life installed electric dishwashers and refrigerators in all apartments with at least three rooms; residents of these apartments could choose between several models of refrigerators. About 60 of the apartments were equipped with fireplaces, which started above the 12th story. Manhattan House's residents could call the staff or any of their neighbors without using a central telephone switchboard, a novel feature at the time of the building's completion. The building was not constructed with a central air conditioning system, since the cost of such a system would have been prohibitive, and since zoning regulations prevented built-in air conditioning from being installed. Instead, engineers installed additional wiring, permitting tenants to install their own air conditioners. To prevent cooking smells from spreading to other apartments, the hallways have higher air pressure than the apartments do.

After Manhattan House was converted into a condominium complex, it included several apartments with three and four bedrooms. Some of the original rental apartments were combined; for example, two units were merged to create a 6,000 ft^{2} (560 m^{2}) penthouse with four bedrooms and four fireplaces. Additionally, interior designers James Huniford, Rita König, and Celerie Kemble each designed one model apartment in the building, which were branded as part of the building's "Model Collection". The penthouses were redesigned in 2014 by Cuban-born interior designer Vicente Wolf. These apartments included materials such as mica, white oak, and stainless steel, as well as countertops made of Caesarstone quartz. The 21st floor contains a 7,597 ft^{2} (705.8 m^{2}) penthouse with nine bedrooms, eight-and-a-half bathrooms, a fireplace, a media room, a private gym, a playroom, and a dedicated service entrance. As part of the condo conversion, Wolf also designed custom stainless-steel fireplace mantels for existing apartments.

== History ==
=== Development ===
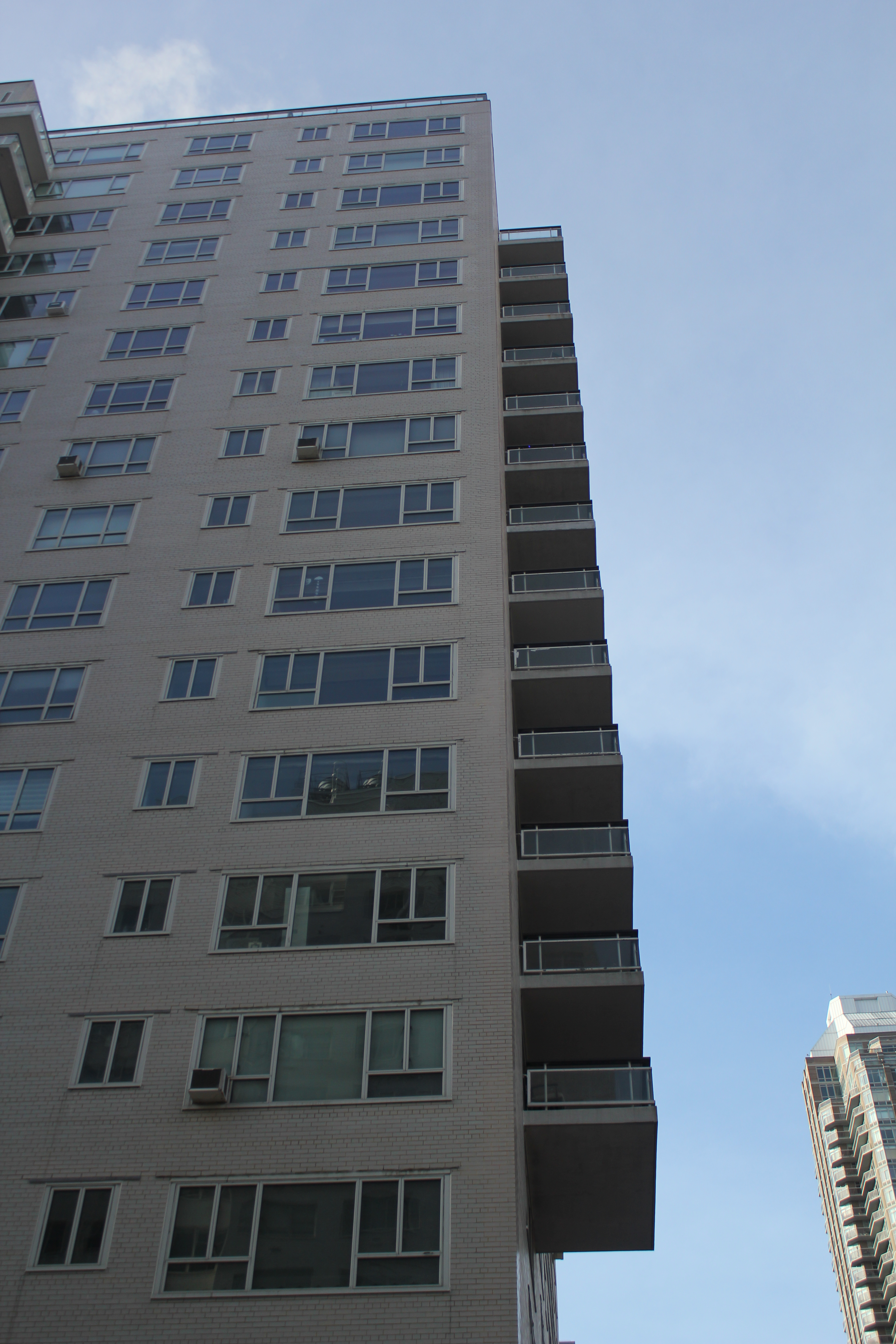
View of some of the building's balconies

The Third Avenue Transit Corporation sold off ten plots at auction in November 1946, including the car barn on the block bounded by Second Avenue, 65th Street, Third Avenue, and 66th Street. The New York Life Insurance Company bought the 66th Street site for $1.6 million, (Note: Equivalent to $20 million in 2024 (Note: Johnston, Louis; Williamson, Samuel H. (2023). "What Was the U.S. GDP Then?". MeasuringWorth. United States Gross Domestic Product deflator figures follow the MeasuringWorth series.)) beating out bidders that included a film studio. New York Life quickly announced plans for a moderate-income apartment complex on the site; it planned to rent out the rooms for $50 per month. (Note: Equivalent to $826 in 2025) In addition, New York Life leased a site immediately to the south, which it originally planned to use as a parking lot. Third Avenue Transit continued to use its 66th Street depot until mid-1947, while negotiations with New York Life were underway. New York Life took title to the site in August 1947 and immediately began demolishing the car barn, a process that was planned to take four months. Because insurance companies at the time were restricted from developing certain types of housing in the city, New York Life planned a limited-dividend development. New York Life hired SOM and Mayer & Whittlesey as architects for the project. An early proposal for the site called for three separate apartment towers. These consisted of a 12-story tower in the center of the site, flanked by two 18- to 20-story towers. These plans were rejected because most of the apartments would have been oriented along the busier avenues, rather than the quieter side streets.

In December 1947, New York Life submitted plans to the New York City Board of Estimate for a 19-story apartment building between 65th and 66th Streets. The structure was to contain 2,350 rooms in total, and it was to be flanked by gardens on 65th and 66th Streets. The company also proposed a public parking garage on the block immediately to the south, with 1,400 to 2,000 parking spaces, and it planned to donate some land along 66th Street to the city government, allowing that street to be widened. The configuration would allow most of the apartments to face a quieter side street. Mayer & Whittlesley and SOM submitted plans for the development to the New York City Department of Buildings in January 1948, but the project was delayed by disputes over the parking garage, which mayor William O'Dwyer ultimately halted in August 1948. Later the same month, New York Life announced that it had postponed the planned apartment building indefinitely because of rising construction costs; the company would instead use the site as a 500-space parking lot.

New York Life announced in April 1949 that the general contractor, Cauldwell-Wingate Company, would immediately begin constructing the building, which was to be known as Manhattan House. New York Life officials hosted a groundbreaking ceremony for the development on April 6, 1949; at that point, the insurance company had already received over a thousand applications from potential tenants. The development was originally expected to cost $11–14 million. (Note: Equivalent to $115–146 million in 2024) Charles E. Lane Jr. was hired as the building's resident manager the following month, and workers began pouring the concrete floor slabs that August. The city and New York Life agreed in September 1949 to construct an 850-space parking lot to the south of Manhattan House, with a public park atop the garage, but a court subsequently halted these plans. Manhattan House topped out during May 1950, and New York Life displayed a "model apartment" at the building the next month.

=== New York Life ownership ===
The first residents began moving into the building at the beginning of October 1950. The first two stores in the development, Manhattan House Stationers and Delicraft Inc., opened in August 1951, at which point New York Life had leased all the storefronts. The other storefronts were occupied by a Longchamps restaurant, Gristedes supermarket, Horn & Hardart automat, a gift shop, florist, and dry cleaner. The apartments were rented at 22 different prices; the cheapest apartment cost $95 per month, while the most expensive penthouse cost $750 per month. (Note: The cheapest apartment was equivalent to $1,152, while the most expensive penthouse was equivalent to $9,093 in 2025.) Rents at Manhattan House were substantially higher than those for similarly-sized buildings at New York Life's Fresh Meadows, Queens, development.

Manhattan House quickly became popular among middle-class residents, despite the building's proximity to the Third Avenue Elevated, and despite the fact that middle-class people did not typically live in apartments. At the time of its opening, Manhattan House had been fully rented. Architectural Forum partially attributed the building's success to the fact that New York Life had capped the building's return on investment of 6 percent, thereby allowing the company to attract tenants without resorting to hectic marketing campaigns. There was even high demand for parking spaces in the building's garage, which cost $35 per month and had a waiting list by 1952. (Note: Equivalent to $424 in 2025) Manhattan House was not particularly family-friendly, as only 78 of the building's original households had children. Even these households had, on average, fewer than two children.

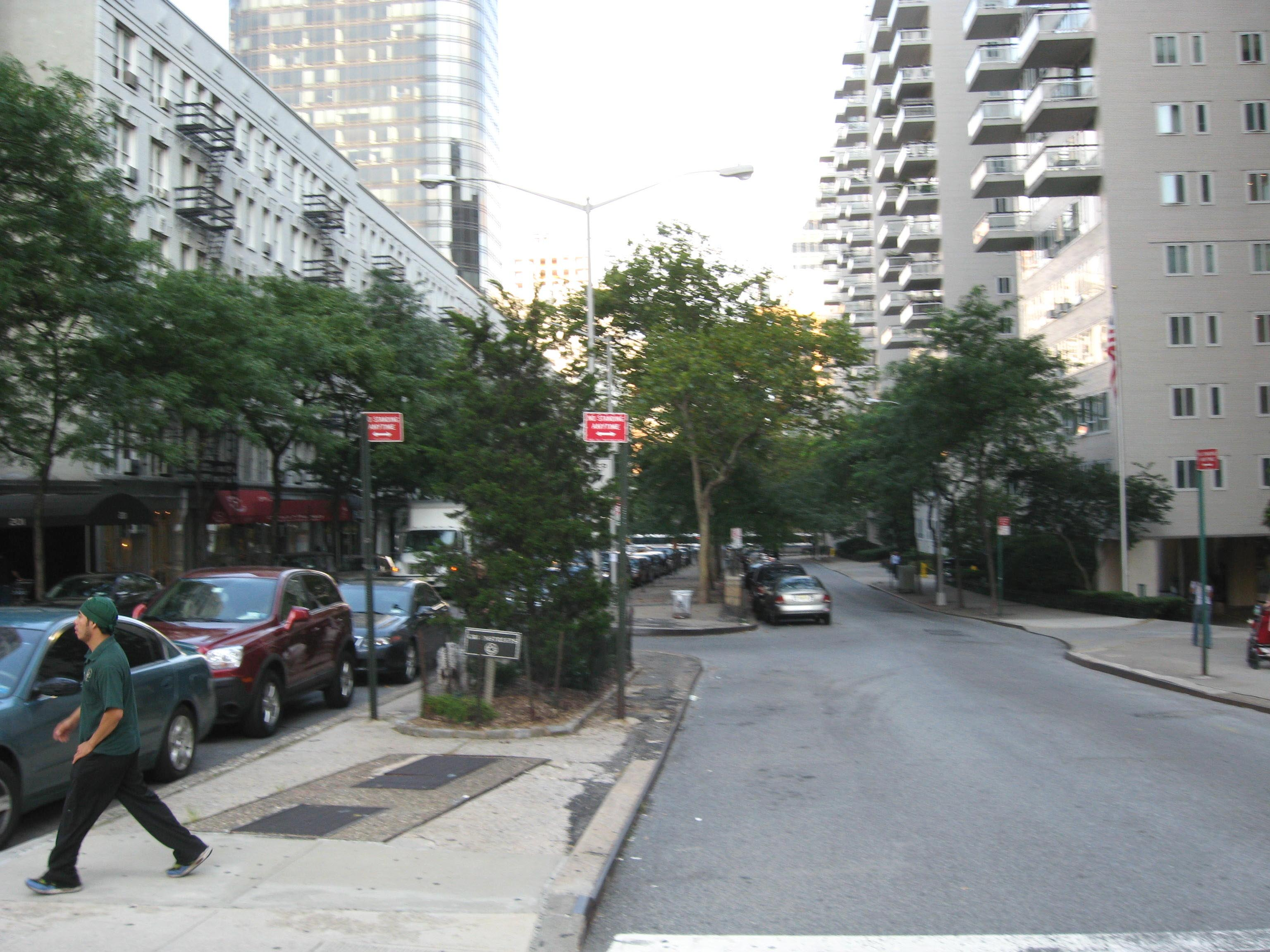
The section of 66th Street outside Manhattan House is a two-way street.

To reduce congestion, the city government reversed the directions of 65th and 66th Streets outside the building in 1956. (Note: East 65th Street had originally carried westbound traffic, while East 66th Street had originally carried eastbound traffic. At Fifth Avenue, four blocks to the west of Manhattan House, there is a transverse road across Central Park at 66th Street, which carries bidirectional traffic. During the 1950s, the city had created an eastbound-only roadway from the transverse to 65th Street; to maintain right-hand traffic flow, the ramp between 66th Street and the transverse road was converted to a westbound-only roadway. The city reversed the entirety of both East 65th and 66th Streets to reduce congestion.) Through traffic on 66th Street began traveling westbound, but the service road in front of Manhattan House still carried eastbound traffic. New York Life extended the service road to cover the entire block, making that segment of 66th Street a two-way road, and installed two U-turns in the median to allow westbound vehicles to access the building's service road. New York Life leased the building's garage to Mayer Brothers Parking System in 1961. After the New York State Legislature passed the Rent Stabilization Law of 1969, all the apartments were protected by rent regulation or rent control. Manhattan House remained an upscale development in the 1970s; at the time, the average monthly rent was $1,000, and the building employed 132 people. The New York Observer reported that one potential resident during the 1970s, a producer for NBC "recalled wearing white gloves to the interview and answering questions about her parents' background despite having long established her own career—and a years-long wait list".

In 1982, New York Life began replacing the building's original casement windows with double-hung sash windows. New York Life officials said they were replacing all 6,800 windows to save energy and to prevent them from unintentionally opening due to high winds. As early as 1996, architect and writer Robert A. M. Stern had suggested that Manhattan House was a viable candidate for official landmark status. Local civic group Friends of the Upper East Side Historic Districts began advocating for the LPC to designate Manhattan House, as well as two other post–World War II structures on the Upper East Side, as official city landmarks in 2002. At the time, a spokesperson for the group said the three buildings' modern-style designs "did want to stand out. That is what made people hate it. But it is an important part of our collective history."

=== Sale and condominium conversion ===
By mid-2005, New York Life was planning to sell Manhattan House for as much as $600 million amid an increase in real-estate prices during the 2000s United States housing bubble. The company reportedly received offers from investors such as Yair Levy and RFR Holding. Around October 21, 2005, New York Life sold Manhattan House to developer N. Richard Kalikow and investor Jeremiah W. O'Connor Jr. for $623 million or $625 million. This amounted to approximately $1.072 million per apartment, then the highest per-unit price ever paid for a rental apartment building in Manhattan. At the time, about half of the building's tenants were protected by rent regulation or rent control and paid $1,800 per month. The remaining residents were paying market rates of up to $20,000 per month; their units had been deregulated because their pre-existing monthly rent had been over the then rent control threshold of $2,000.

==== Initial offering plan and disputes ====
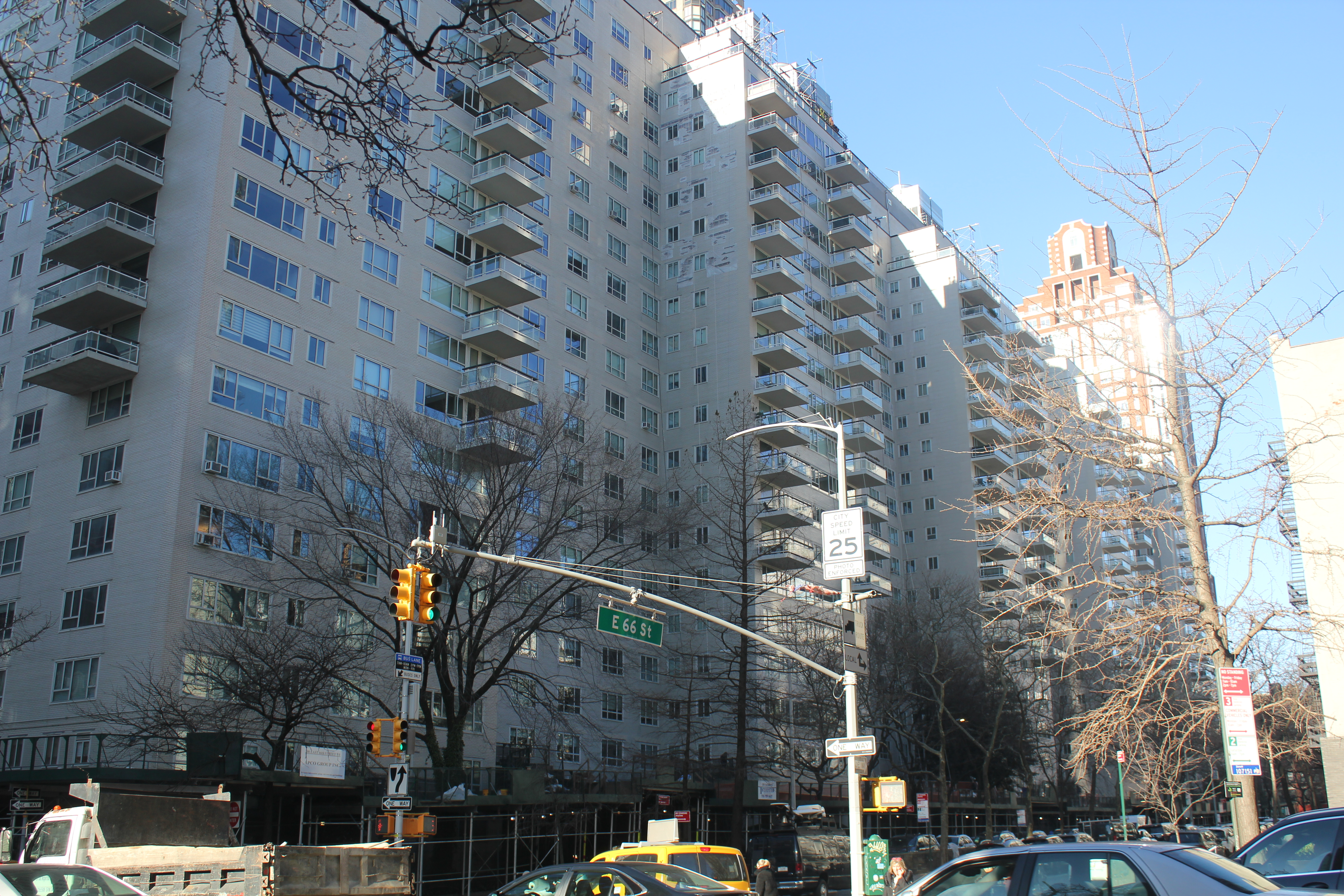
Seen from Second Avenue and 66th Street

Kalikow and O'Connor planned to convert the building into condominiums for an estimated $1.1 billion, and they wished to sell apartments for $1,500/ft^{2} ($16,000/m^{2}). Kalikow justified the high purchase and conversion price by saying that the East Side contained a shortage of upscale condos. The men would rearrange the apartments but leave the decorations, such as balconies and fireplaces, largely intact. The condos would range from 600 ft^{2} (56 m^{2}) studio apartments to 2,400 ft^{2} (220 m^{2}) units with four or five bedrooms. The developers planned to add a billiards room, fitness room, library, and rooftop lounge; they also added valet parking and a concierge service. Unlike typical condo conversions, where developers paid for the projects with their own money, the partners raised money for the project from capital calls. Kalikow and O'Connor submitted a condominium offering plan to the office of the Attorney General of New York in February 2006.

The new owners canceled the leases of 327 market-rate tenants, and many residents, who were largely rich and elderly, were moving out by early 2006. The project was soon delayed due to lawsuits and budgetary overruns. Existing tenants claimed that O'Connor and Kalikow had refused to renew their leases, had increased their rent significantly, and were harassing them with loud construction noises. These tenants also alleged that the men were offering a lower-than-normal "insider's discount", compared with condos of similar size, to existing residents who wanted to buy condos. One resident claimed that her grandfather had died because of the stress associated with being evicted from the building. Other residents claimed that the building suffered from rat infestations, flooding, and unlawfully high accumulations of asbestos. Several tenants filed a complaint in 2006 with the attorney general's office, claiming that Kalikow, O'Connor, and their lender Credit Suisse had sold bonds for the project before the attorney general had formally approved it. Hundreds of tenants who did not want to relocate had donated to a legal fund.

Attorney general Andrew Cuomo accepted the condo-offering plan in March 2007. By that April, the Manhattan House Tenants' Group claimed that Kalikow and O'Connor had forced hundreds of residents out. At the time, the LPC was considering designating Manhattan House as a New York City landmark. Additionally, Kalikow and O'Connor were themselves involved in an acrimonious dispute over financing, leading Kalikow to sue O'Connor in April 2007 for $75 million. Kalikow wanted to recruit outside investors to refinance the project, while O'Connor had filed a lawsuit in the New York Supreme Court to buy out Kalikow's stake. That August, Kalikow also sued Prudential Douglas Elliman, the broker for the condos, claiming that Prudential Douglas Elliman and O'Connor were conspiring against him.

==== Revised offering plan ====
O'Connor's company, O'Connor Capital Partners, submitted a revised offering plan in October 2007, buying out Kalikow's stake. The revised offering plan indicated that the condos would be sold for a total of $958 million; in addition, the discount for existing residents was increased from 15 to 25 percent. O'Connor began displaying model apartments to prospective condo buyers the same month. He obtained a $750 million loan for the building from German bank HSH Nordbank; under the terms of the loan, he had to sell 15 percent of the apartments by June 1, 2008. The LPC designated Manhattan House as a New York City landmark on October 30, 2007, and sales of condominiums began the next month. A State Supreme Court judge ruled in January 2008 that existing tenants did not have standing to challenge the condo-conversion plan, which the attorney general's office had already approved. However, few people were willing to buy condos after the bankruptcy of Lehman Brothers in 2008, and some of the existing buyers tried to cancel their purchase contracts. At least one prospective buyer sued O'Connor to cancel her contract in 2008, expressing concerns that the developer would default on a building loan.

O'Connor wished to sell the building's retail space for $100 million by March 2008, and the attorney general's office declared the offering plan to be effective in August 2008. Madison Capital agreed that October to buy the retail space for $86 million; at the time, stores such as Aldo, Club Monaco, Lululemon Athletica, and Staples Inc. occupied all of the retail space. Corcoran Sunshine Marketing Group was hired as the project's new broker in early 2009, replacing Prudential Douglas Elliman. By then, 140 buyers had signed purchase contracts, and about 60 buyers had finalized their contracts. To attract buyers, O'Connor reduced condo prices by 20 percent. The building's rooftop bar opened in June 2009, by which point fewer than 80 condos remained unsold; there were another 200 apartments that had not been converted. Ultimately, O'Connor Capital Partners spent $1.1 billion on the conversion, which, at the time, was one of the most expensive condo conversions in the city's history.

By 2010, there was again increasing demand for condos at Manhattan House. To accommodate these increases in demand, O'Connor started selling several larger apartments, and he hired three interior designers to create three model apartments. The remaining condos were being sold for $1,700/ft^{2} ($18,000/m^{2}) by 2012, and about 140 rental tenants still lived at Manhattan House. At the same time, O'Connor was still involved in a lawsuit with 35 holdout tenants, who still occupied rental apartments. In 2014, Madison Capital and JPMorgan Chase sold the retail space to German firm GLL Real Estate Partners for $110 million. The same year, O'Connor began selling the penthouse apartments (which had remained previously unsold) after Vicente Wolf had renovated them. The conversion project was completed in December 2015; the building still had 93 rent-controlled tenants at the time. James Development bought 72 units in 2017 for $83.3 million, becoming one of the largest condominium owners in the building. The same year, Manhattan House surpassed $1 billion in total condominium sales, with 69 percent of the units sold.

== Notable tenants ==
Among Manhattan House's first residents was Gordon Bunshaft, who lived at the building for the rest of his life; he displayed art and modern furniture in his apartment. The actress Grace Kelly, who became the Princess of Monaco in 1956, was another early tenant, relocating to Manhattan House from the nearby Barbizon Hotel for Women. The clarinetist Benny Goodman lived in one of Manhattan House's penthouse apartments and reportedly invited Bhumibol Adulyadej, then the king of Thailand, to his home. Baseball player Jackie Robinson also lived at Manhattan House. Other notable tenants included furniture designer Florence Knoll, filmmaker Rubaiyat Hossain, former New York governor Hugh Carey, and Horn & Hardart co-founder Frank Hardart. After the building was converted to condos, its residents included David Sackler of the Sackler pharmaceutical family.

== Impact ==
=== Reception ===
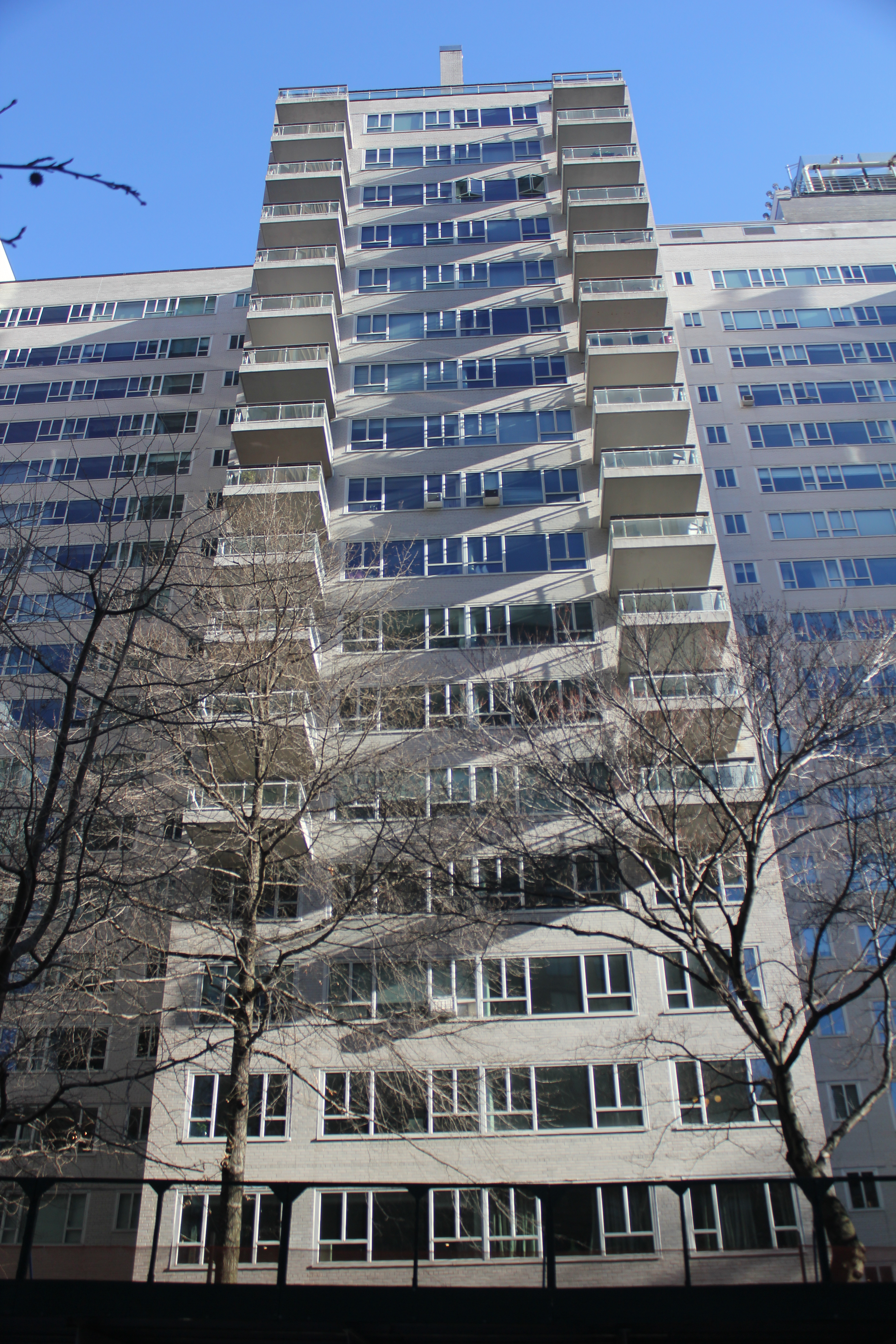
View of one of the wings

Prior to the building's completion, New York World-Telegram editor James L. Holton quoted an advisor for New York Life as saying that Manhattan House was "the new Rockefeller Center" in terms of its importance. Architectural Record magazine praised Manhattan House's layout in 1948, saying: "The use of land in New York residential areas has stuck pretty rigidly to traditional formulas and has seldom been approached with as fresh an eye as was applied by the architects of the New York Life Insurance Company's latest apartment house project". The next year, the same magazine wrote that Manhattan House "carries out on a large scale, in a big city, an indoor-outdoor synthesis hitherto found mostly in modern country homes".

When Manhattan House opened, Progressive Architecture magazine wrote of the lobby: "In all, the appearance is light yet intimate. Coloring is serene-all is restful and comfortable with no attempt at foolish little decorative bit that would be completely lost." Architectural Forum wrote that Manhattan House was "the biggest, whitest, and most interesting postwar mountain of cliff dwellings for New York City's well-heeled natives". Lewis Mumford, who wrote a detailed analysis of the building in November 1951, praised the structure as a "paragon of economy, elegance, and utility". On the other hand, Mumford regarded the structure as too large for the surrounding neighborhood, and he questioned other aspects such as the air-conditioning units on the facade and the usefulness of the balconies. The American Institute of Architects' New York chapter proclaimed Manhattan House as the best apartment building built in the city during 1950 and 1951, calling it "extremely attractive in appearance and beautiful in detailing and materials".

When the original windows were removed in 1982, Paul Goldberger of The New York Times said: "It is shocking to think of a building erected as recently as 1950 as being in need of official landmark protection, but that surely seems to be the case here." Christopher Gray of the Times wrote in 1998: "Despite its exterior plainness, the building's design is sophisticated." Stern considered the building to be "the most literal manifestation in New York of Le Corbusier's postwar conception of vertical living", and the LPC similarly compared Manhattan House to Le Corbusier's principle of unité d'habitation. Matt A. V. Chaban of The New York Times wrote in 2016 that "the midcentury mode was seen in the white brick behemoth of Manhattan House on East 66th Street and its myriad imitators".

=== Influence on other buildings ===
Although Manhattan House was widely praised, few developments on the Upper East Side followed its lead, largely because of the dearth of available sites in the neighborhood that occupied an entire block. Its design did inspire that of numerous other white-brick structures around New York City, including 2 Fifth Avenue, Washington Square Village, Stewart House, Imperial House, and the buildings at 215 East 68th Street and 500 East 77th Street. Goldberger wrote in 1979 that Manhattan House was "the spiritual parent of all the white‐brick high‐rises that pollute the esthetic atmosphere of the Upper East Side", although he said the building was the "first distinguished piece of postwar housing in Manhattan, and in some ways it remains the best". By 1994, Manhattan House was one of about 200 white-brick buildings in the city. Historic Districts Council director Simeon Bankoff said that, although white brick had become an overused material, "Manhattan House is an incredibly important building, and it was really the very best of a bad lot." According to architectural historian Andrew Dolkart, the use of white brick also contributed to the increasing popularity of balconies at middle-class apartment buildings.

A 1966 New York Times article credited the construction of Manhattan House, along with the Sutton Terrace development on Sutton Place, with having helped revitalize the southernmost part of the Upper East Side. Carter B. Horsley of the Times described Manhattan House as a "pioneer project" among large residential developments on the Upper East Side; according to Horsley, such developments had reached the northernmost part of the neighborhood by the early 1980s. Horsley also attributed Manhattan House, as well as Butterfield House, as having influenced lobby designs in New York City, denoting "the transition from the somewhat modest simplicity of most lobbies since the Depression".

== See also ==
- List of New York City Designated Landmarks in Manhattan from 59th to 110th Streets
