= Julian Whittlesey =

American architect (1905–1995)

- Born: Julian Hill Whittlesey; October 27, 1905; Greenwich, Connecticut, U.S.
- Died: May 20, 1995 (aged 89); Wilton, Connecticut, U.S.
- Occupation: architect
- Years active: 1931–1977
- Employer(s): Mayer & Whittlesey, Whittlesey Conklin + Rossant
- Known for: large apartment buildings
- Notable work: Manhattan House
- Political party: Democratic Party
- Movement: New Deal
- Spouse: Eunice Stoddard Smith
- Children: 1

Julian Hill Whittlesey (October 27, 1905 – May 20, 1995 ) was a prominent American architect and planner who co-founded the firms Mayer & Whittlesey and then Whittlesey Conklin + Rossant.

== Background ==
Whittlesey was born in Greenwich, Connecticut. He studied civil engineering and architecture at Yale (degrees in 1927 and 1930). He also studied on a fellowship to the American School of Classical Studies in Athens.

== Career ==
In the early 1930s, Whittlesey worked for the Resettlement Administration and the U.S. Public Housing Administration. During World War II, he designed military-related housing and administrative buildings.

In 1935, he co-founded Mayer & Whittlesey, with Albert Mayer. The firm designed Manhattan House and other large buildings. They also helped design the cities of Kitimat, British Columbia, and Chandigarh, India. In the 1950s, he co-founded Whittlesey, Conklin & Rossant, based in Reston, Virginia.

== Works ==
=== Buildings ===
- Manhattan House
- The Butterfield House
- 240 Central Park South
- Printer's Industrial Welfare Building
- Bellmawr Homes
- James Weldon Johnson Houses (in association with Robert J. Reiley and Harry Prince)
- Rangel Houses (in Washington Heights)
- New School:
  - Jacob M. Kaplan Building (West Twelfth Street)
  - Albert A. List Building (West Eleventh Street)

=== City plans ===
- Kitimat, British Columbia
- Chandigarh, India
- Reston, Virginia

=== Other ===
- UN Playground (with Isamu Noguchi)

== See also ==
- Albert Mayer
- James Rossant
- Manhattan House

== External sources ==
- "Gottscho-Schleisner Collection". Library of Congress.
