= Butterfield House =

Butterfield House may refer to:

- Butterfield House (New York City)
- Grafton Public Library (Grafton, Vermont), also known as Butterfield House
