= 240 Central Park South =

Residential building in Manhattan, New York

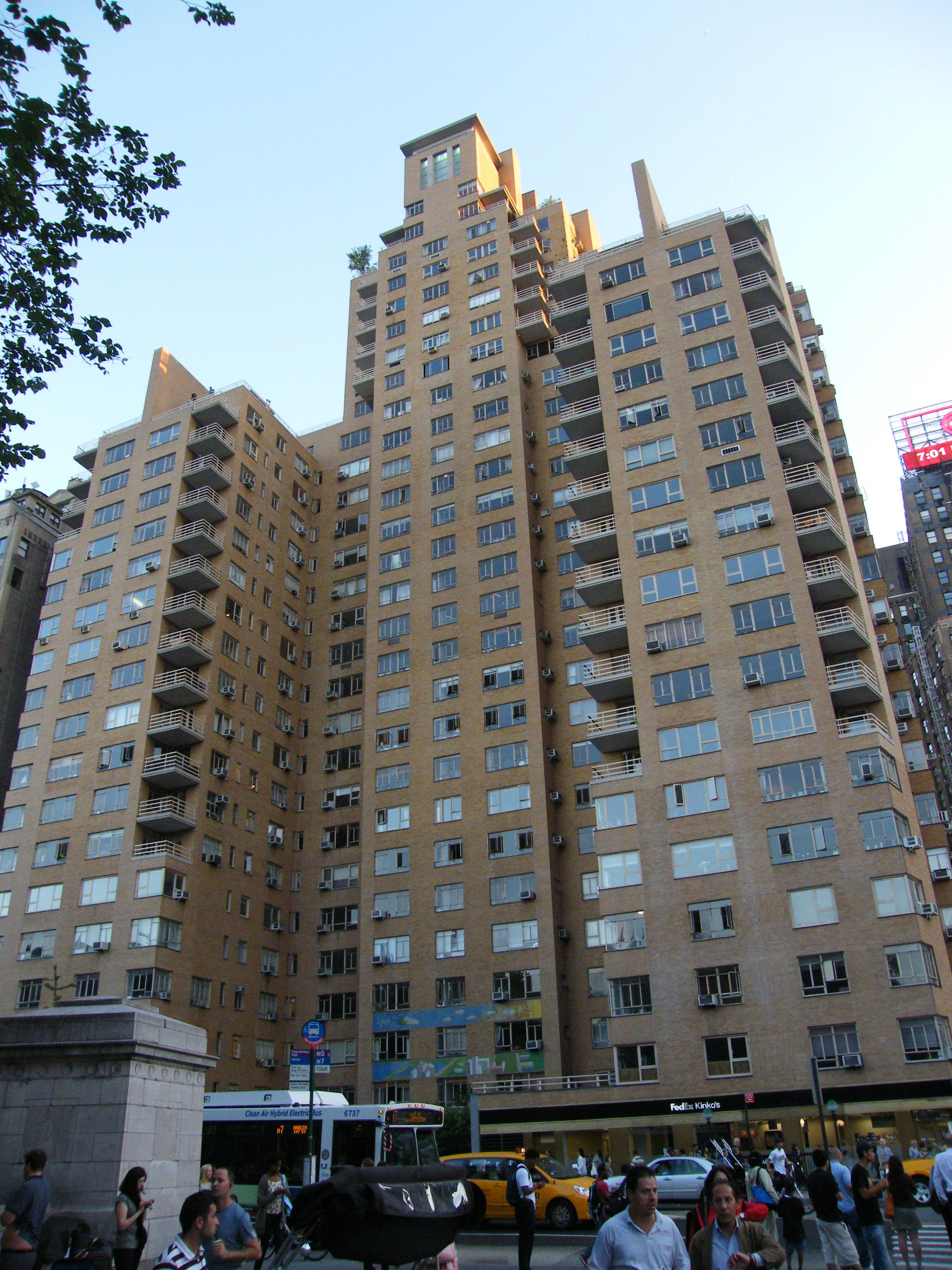
- Interactive map of the 240 Central Park South area

General information
- Type: Residential and commercial
- Architectural style: Art Deco, Moderne
- Location: 240 Central Park South, New York, NY 10019
- Coordinates: 40°46′02″N 73°58′52″W
- Construction started: 1939
- Completed: September 1940
- Cost: $37 million

Height
- Height: 265 feet (81 m)

Technical details
- Structural system: Steel
- Floor count: 28
- Floor area: 387,428 square feet (35,993 m^{2})
- Lifts/elevators: 6
- Grounds: 36,475 square feet (3,388.6 m^{2})

Design and construction
- Architects: Albert Mayer and Julian Whittlesey
- Developer: Mayer family
- Main contractor: J.H. Taylor Construction Company

Website
- www.240cps.nyc
- 240 Central Park South
- U.S. National Register of Historic Places
- New York State Register of Historic Places
- New York City Landmark
- Location: 240 Central Park S., Manhattan, New York
- Coordinates: 40°46′02″N 73°58′52″W
- Built: 1940
- Architect: Albert Mayer and Julian Whittlesey
- Architectural style: Art Deco, Moderne
- NRHP reference No.: 09000304
- NYSRHP No.: 06101.008678
- NYCL No.: 2116

Significant dates
- Added to NRHP: May 12, 2009
- Designated NYSRHP: March 26, 2009
- Designated NYCL: June 25, 2002

240 Central Park South is a residential building in Midtown Manhattan in New York City. Designed by Albert Mayer and Julian Whittlesey, it was built between 1939 and 1940 by the J.H. Taylor Construction Company, an enterprise of the Mayer family. 240 Central Park South is designed in a combination of the Art Deco, Moderne, and Modern Classical styles, with over 300 apartments.

240 Central Park South faces Central Park to the north, Columbus Circle and Broadway to the west, and 58th Street to the south. The building occupies half of its 1-acre (0.40 ha) land lot, and is largely C-shaped in form. It consists of a 20-story section along Central Park South topped by an 8-story tower, as well as a 15-story section along 58th Street; the two sections are connected by the ground-level lobby. The facade is made of orange brick with jagged storefronts on Broadway, while some of the apartments contain cantilevered balconies. The building contains Marea, a Michelin-starred restaurant, as well as open spaces such as an interior courtyard and rooftop terraces. A mosaic by Amédée Ozenfant hangs over the main entrance on Central Park South.

When completed, 240 Central Park South was one of Manhattan's largest apartment buildings. The apartment complex was marketed as an alternative to the fast-growing suburbs being developed in the New York City area at the time. The design received critical acclaim from reviewers such as Lewis Mumford and the Architectural Forum. The building was designated a city landmark by the New York City Landmarks Preservation Commission in 2002 and was added to the National Register of Historic Places in 2009.

== Site ==
240 Central Park South is on the southeastern side of Columbus Circle in the Midtown Manhattan neighborhood of New York City. It has lot dimensions of 189 feet (58 m) on Central Park South (59th Street) to the north; 215 feet (66 m) on Broadway to the west; and 145 feet (44 m) on 58th Street to the south. (Note: The National Park Service considers the Broadway frontage to be 165 feet (50 m) long, with the northernmost 50 feet (15 m) on Columbus Circle. At this location, Broadway is tangent to Columbus Circle.) The land lot covers 36,475 square feet (3,388.6 m^{2}). Gainsborough Studios and 220 Central Park South are to the east; Central Park is across Central Park South; 2 Columbus Circle, Deutsche Bank Center, and Trump International Hotel and Tower are across Columbus Circle; and Central Park Tower and 1790 Broadway are across 58th Street. Entrances to the New York City Subway's 59th Street–Columbus Circle station, served by the 1, A, B, C, and D trains, are directly outside the building.

In the late 19th and early 20th centuries, Central Park South was developed as Manhattan's "Gold Coast", with many prestigious hotels and apartment buildings being erected on its route. The site of 240 Central Park South was previously owned by George Ehret, a brewer who had become one of New York City's largest real estate owners by the 1920s, behind only the Astor family. Ehret combined seventeen lots on the site between 1881 and 1908. He had intended to build a "roadhouse or hotel" on his land. By 1927, the Ehret lot was one of only two undeveloped blockfronts on Broadway between Columbus Circle and Times Square. Shortly afterward, Ehret's lot and the neighboring Engine Company 23 firehouse on 233 West 58th Street were developed, with a two-story building being erected on the site to cater to the area's automobile industry.

== Architecture ==
240 Central Park South was designed by Mayer & Whittlesey, a partnership between Albert Mayer and Julian Whittlesey, in a mixture of the Art Deco, Moderne, and Modern Classical architectural styles. Cynthia Wiley and Eleanor Robertson Paepcke were the landscape architects. The building was constructed by the J. H. Taylor Construction Company and managed by the J. H. Taylor Management Corporation; both companies were operated by the Mayer family. Sarah Tobias, renting manager of J. H. Taylor Management Corporation, was involved in the inclusion of interior design elements. Various contractors were hired for the windows, materials, elevators, floor and wall coverings, furnishings, hardware, electrical installation, plumbing, and heating and air conditioning.

=== Form ===
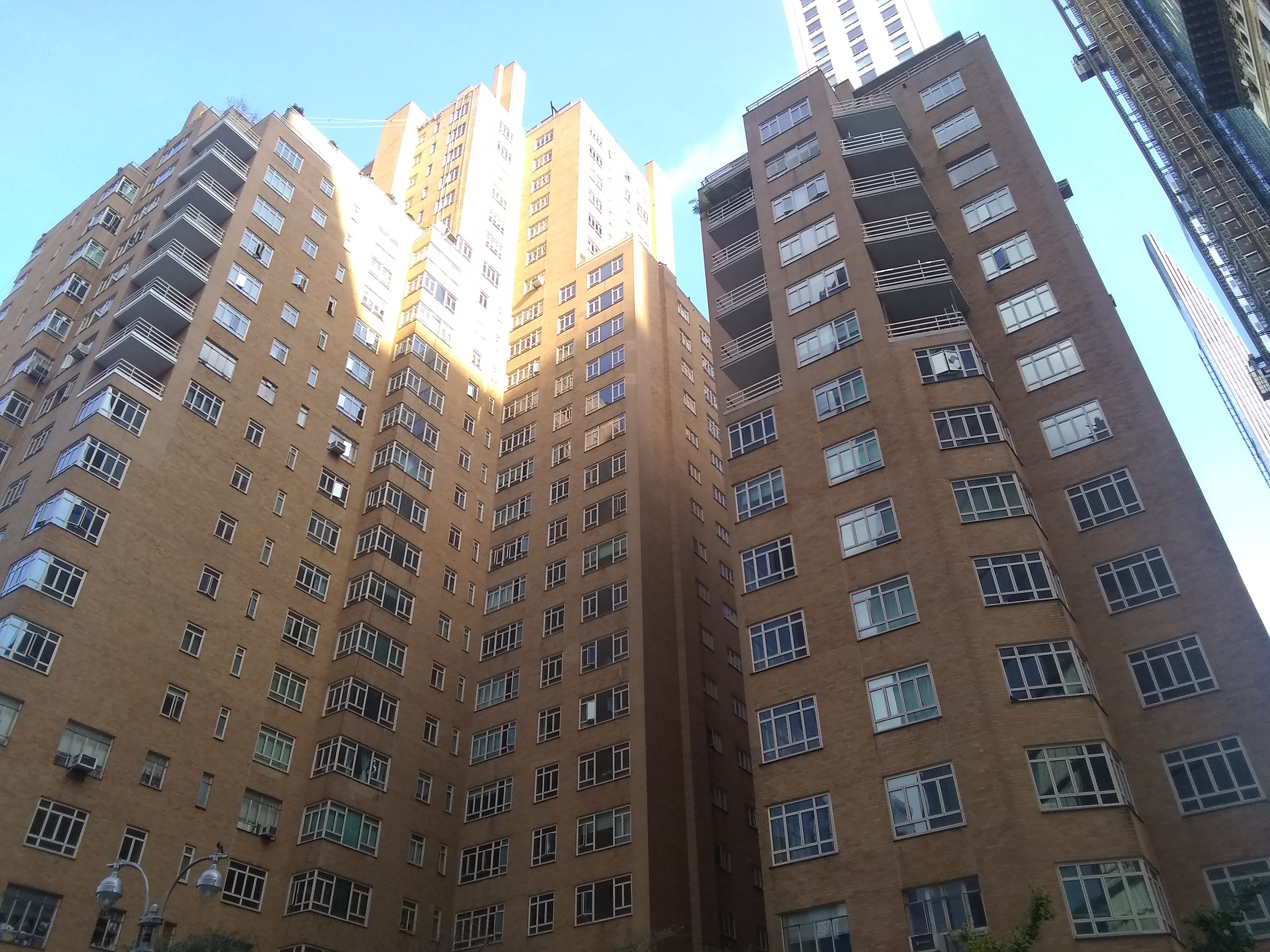
The two apartment blocks that make up 240 Central Park South as seen from Broadway

240 Central Park South occupies about half of its land lot. The building is largely C-shaped in form and contains two primary sections, a 28-story section on Central Park South and a 15-story section on 58th Street, connected by the lobby running along Broadway. Atop the main roofs of each apartment block are placed chimneys and water towers. 240 Central Park South is variously quoted as having either 325, 326, or 327 apartments across its two apartment blocks. (Note: A National Park Service report in 2009 indicated that the upper floors only had 308 apartments at that time. As of 2020, the New York City Department of City Planning records the building as having 321 units, of which 297 are residential units.)

The northern apartment block on Central Park South is 265 feet (81 m) tall and rises 28 stories. The lowest 20 stories rise without setbacks, except in the corners where there are balconies, while the center section contains a smaller 8-story tower atop the 20th story. The bulk of the northern block is C-shaped with two wings to the west and east flanking a small court to the north. The eastern wall is set back from the lot line and the adjoining building.

The southern apartment block at 235 West 58th Street is 166 feet (51 m) tall and contains 15 stories. It rises without setbacks on any side.

=== Facade ===
The facade of the building is made of orange brick with varying hues, set within a six-course American bond. The facade typically contain slate window sills. The apartments have wide steel-framed casement windows facing the street. Some of the corners contain windows that are cantilevered at the corner, with between one and three panes in each window. Smaller windows are used where the views contained obstructions, such as adjacent office structures, at the time of the building's development. Another window type used in the building was a wide opening with a high sill, used at locations that required cross ventilation.

==== Base ====
The main entrance is at Central Park South and is within a small landscaped courtyard between either of the northern block's wings. The entrance is reached through a concrete sidewalk, flanked by low retaining walls and situated under an awning. The entrance doors are within a slightly projecting curved pavilion with a brick facade and large windows. The western (right) side of the courtyard has a gray-blue terracotta wall of square tiles made by the Atlantic Terra Cotta Company, which encloses a single-story storefront. The eastern (left) side had ceramic plaques that were removed by the 2000s. On the northern facade, above the center three windows on the second and third story, are two abstract mosaic panels, which comprise "The Quiet City", a mural by Amédée Ozenfant.

The secondary entrance is at 58th Street near the corner with Broadway, and contains a double doorway surrounded by Atlantic Terra Cotta blocks, as well as a planter to the west (left) of the entrance. A loading dock was provided on the easternmost portion of the 58th Street side to eliminate congestion. The loading area has a ramp descending directly to the basement. The ramp is made of concrete and can fit two vehicles. Planting beds originally flanked either side of the ramp, while a canopy encloses the northern side of the ramp.

There are ten storefronts on Broadway in total; the center four have rounded corners and are flanked on each side by three square storefronts. The central shops on Broadway are staggered along the diagonal property line, with jagged setbacks and rounded windows. Mayer intentionally included the rounded storefronts to increase the value of the display windows, because he said that the rounded windows gave each shop "many of the advantages of a corner location". Architectural Forum magazine, in 1941, said that the storefronts "permitted the enlargement of the normal sidewalk area into a kind of concourse".

==== Balconies ====
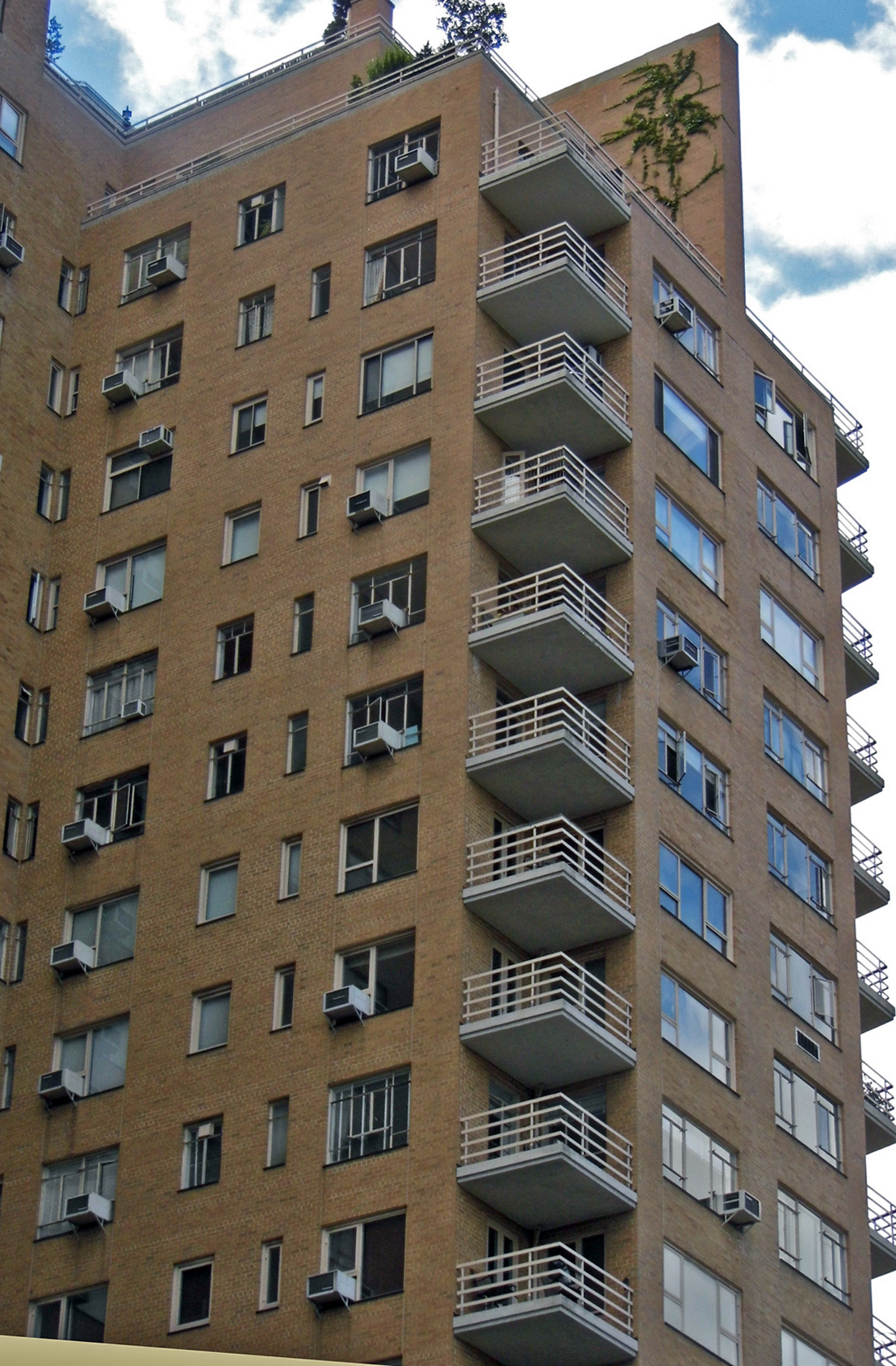
Detail of balconies

About 100 apartments have open-air balconies. These balconies have an average floor area of 8 by 8 feet (2.4 by 2.4 m) and are cantilevered from the windows. The balconies are concrete slabs and largely retain their original metal railings as of the early 21st century.

At the northern apartment block, the balconies are above the seventh story on the northern side facing Central Park, and above the twelfth floor on the southern side. The only exception is on the northeastern corner, where the balconies start above the 16th floor. The balconies on the northern facade were meant to give residents a view above the park's tree line, which was not possible below the seventh floor. In addition, the "tower" of the northern block contains balconies at either northern corner on the 22nd through 26th floors, and a terrace on the 27th floor. At the southern apartment block, all of the balconies are above the 10th story.

=== Features ===
240 Central Park South's interior structure is composed of a steel skeleton frame made by Bethlehem Steel. The columns rest on footings made of reinforced concrete, while the floors are made of concrete slabs between the interior beams. The building has a gross floor area of 387,428 square feet (35,993.2 m^{2}).

The building was designed with its own power generation plant, containing steam boilers, a diesel engine, and two steam turbines with a combined capacity of 625 kilowatts (838 hp), as well as an attached hot water heating system. There are six elevators in the building, four for passengers and two for freight. Four of the elevators serve the northern apartment block and the other two elevators serve the southern apartment block. The building was designed with several methods of soundproofing and insulation. For example, some elevator parts were made of leather, carpeting was placed on the corridor floors to reduce noise, and bedrooms are generally placed away from elevator shafts.

==== Lobby ====
The lobby has entrances from both Central Park South and 58th Street, and is divided into two sections, one around each entrance. The northern lobby contains access to the four northern elevators, two on either side of the passageway connecting to the southern lobby. The elevator banks are surrounded by marble. The northern lobby contains green terrazzo flooring, copper-clad walls, recessed lighting, and a marble mail desk. The copper-clad walls and terrazzo floors are continued in the passageway between the northern and southern lobbies. A solarium, with marble wall panels and large windows, is next to this passageway, facing onto an enclosed conservatory to the east. The southern lobby contains access to the two southern elevators.

The lobby contains doors to the storefronts facing Broadway and Columbus Circle, as well as a restaurant space on the northeastern corner of the building at Central Park South. The northernmost storefront was adjacent to the western wall of the entrance courtyard and was initially entered from the lobby, before being combined with the two northernmost storefronts on Broadway. Since 2009, the restaurant space has housed Marea, a Michelin-starred Italian and seafood restaurant. Plans of the lobby also show maids' rooms and offices clustered around the central courtyard and near the 58th Street entrance.

==== Gardens ====
240 Central Park South's open spaces include the small courtyard at the main entrance, plantings along 58th Street, the enclosed conservatory at ground level, and rooftop gardens and terraces atop various parts of the building. The conservatory at ground level was planted with crabapples, magnolia, and white birch, with Boston ivy on the conservatory's walls. On the roof of the lobby between the two apartment blocks, a garden with willows, forsythia, rhododendrons, and grass plots with flower beds was planted. The roof of the conservatory curves above and east of the lobby roof. The rooftop of the 58th Street apartment block was planted with geometrically shaped flower beds.

==== Apartments ====
The apartments on the 2nd through 20th floor of the northern block are arranged around a C-shaped corridor. The apartments in the 21st through 28th floors of the northern block are arranged around a T-shaped corridor, and the apartments in the southern block are arranged around a straight corridor. All of the corridors have plaster walls, carpeted floors, and terrazzo baseboards. The corridors also contain soffits, which carry utility wires.

The layouts of the units vary, and even between different floors, tenant preferences affected the floor plan of each unit. However, several design elements were standardized, such as doors, windows, and kitchen units. Each apartment had a window in its kitchen, although these were technically unnecessary, as mechanical ventilation systems had been legalized shortly before the building's completion. Above the seventh floor, each corner room was designed as a balcony containing a large window. The units were each designed with between one and four rooms; the three- and four-room units have separate dining rooms, while the one-room units have dining alcoves. The units above the sixth floor also had log-burning fireplaces. Some units retain their original bookcases and shelves, which were built into the walls. Many apartments contain plaster walls, hardwood floors, wooden wall moldings, and exposed-beam ceilings.

At its opening, the building provided maid service, and had restrooms and service halls for personnel on every floor. Additionally, the basement had rooms for work, storage, and laundry, while the 20th floor of the northern apartment block had a solarium and recreation area. The 20th floor of the northern block also contains three roof terraces, one each to the west, east, and south of the tower.

== History ==
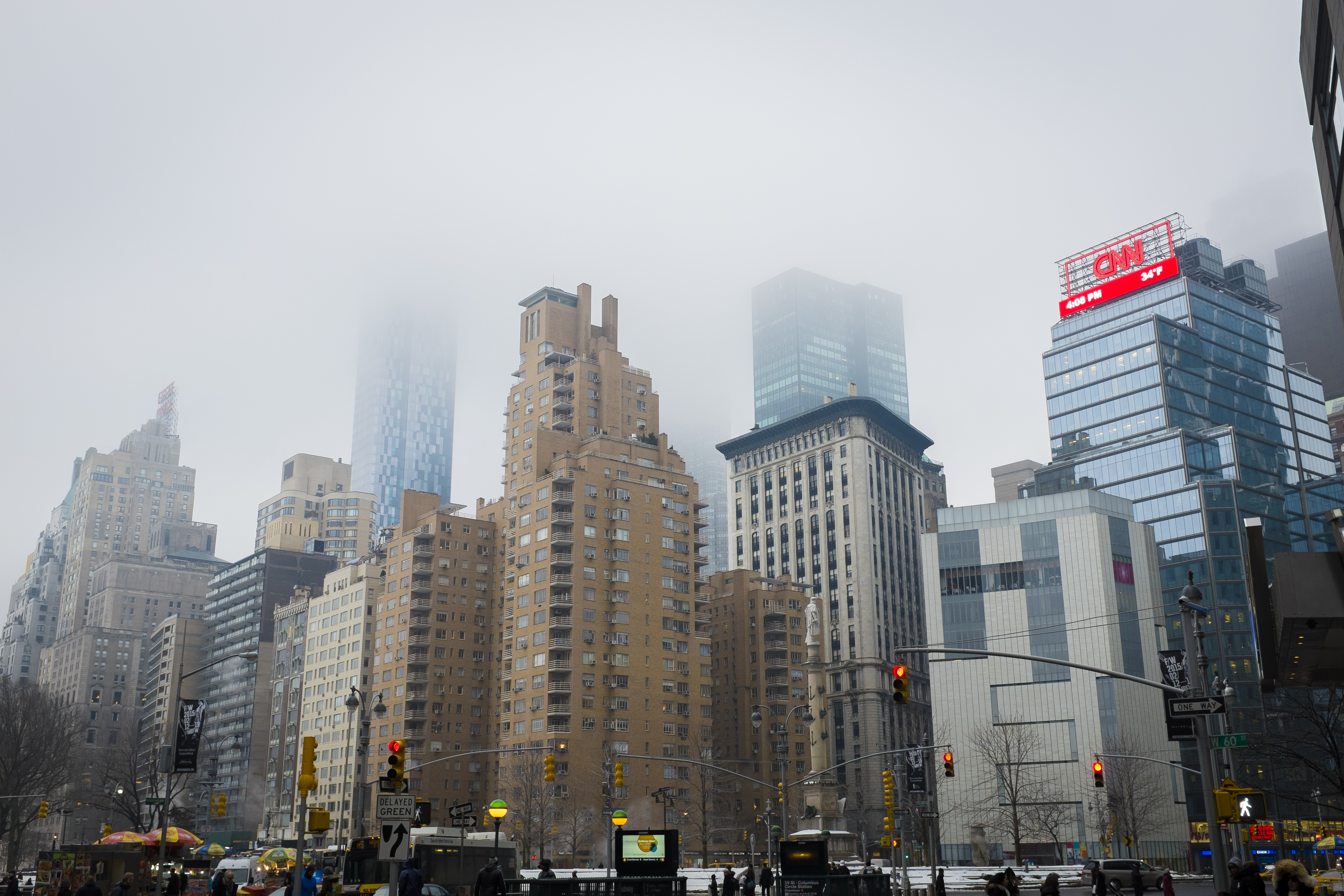
Seen at center from across Columbus Circle. One57 (obscured by fog) is at left, while 5 Columbus Circle and 2 Columbus Circle are at right.

In the early 20th century, the Mayer family was prominent in the development and management of New York City real estate. Albert Mayer and four of his five siblings were active in the industry. He worked at the J. H. Taylor Construction Company from 1919 to 1939, when he worked with Whittlesey. By the 1930s, Mayer and Whittlesey were formulating plans for an apartment building combining an urban setting with suburban features such as green space. The New York Herald Tribune said they came up with the idea as they studied architecture in the European cities of Amsterdam, Stockholm, and Vienna.

=== Planning and construction ===
Several investors from Chicago were planning a 25-story apartment building on the Ehret site at Columbus Circle by March 1939. 240 Central Park South Inc., a subsidiary of J. H. Taylor Management, bought the Ehret site that May, with plans to erect a $4.5 million development there. The sale included a building loan of $2.5 million and the transfer of an existing $875,000 mortgage. Mayer and Whittlesey had selected the site as the location for their apartment block because it was near a park, transportation, businesses, and entertainment. The architects wanted the building to be profitable, modern in design, and socially desirable, while also maximizing the number of apartments with views of Central Park. Mayer and Whittlesey reviewed several designs before deciding to build 240 Central Park South as two towers. The decisions were made by a "design board" composed of the architects, owner, operating manager, rental manager, and builders.

In July 1939, Mayer and Whittlesey filed plans for the apartment building, estimated to cost $1.6 million (equivalent to $37 million in 2025). 240 Central Park South was the largest apartment project in Manhattan at the time. By January 1940, steel was being erected, and the building was scheduled to be completed that June. Leasing started in March 1940, and J. H. Taylor Management commenced a marketing campaign with mailers and newspaper advertisements to attract people looking for a suburban ambience. Fifty-two units had been rented within one month, which renting manager Sarah Tobias attributed to the inclusion of trees and balconies. Potential tenants were carefully selected by Tobias's team, and the entire tenth floor was furnished to demonstrate the variety of apartments available. The amenities in 240 Central Park South, such as the restaurant, stores, solarium, and roof terraces, were characteristic of those found in both apartment hotels and traditional residential apartments of the time.

=== Use ===
==== 20th century ====
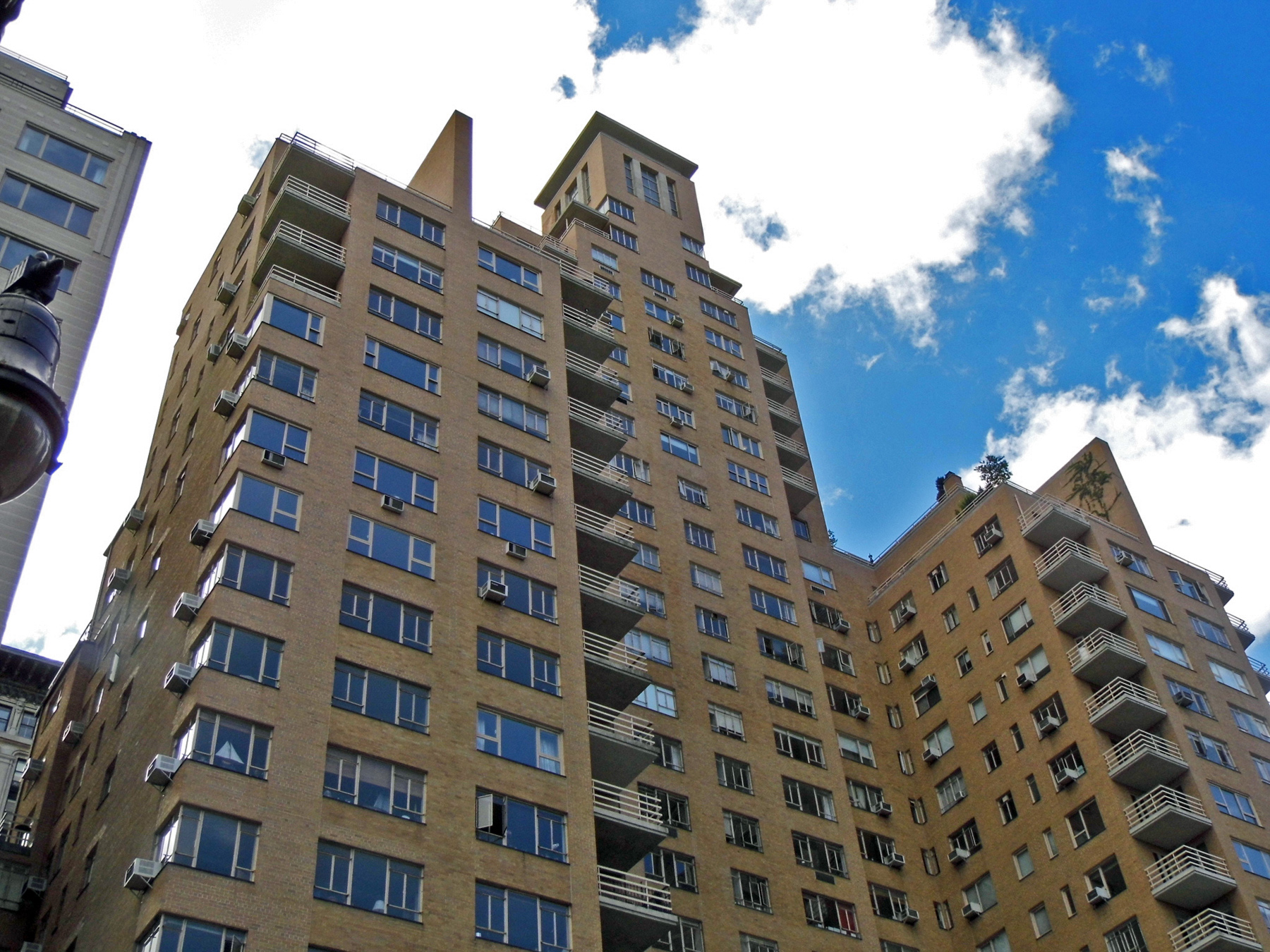
Seen from Central Park South

Residents started moving into the building in September 1940, by which 194 of the apartments had been rented. A ground floor storefront was leased to Fanny Farmer. The restaurant space was leased to a cafe called Le Cafe Arnold, whose operators hired Mayer and Whittlesey to design the restaurant's plant- and vine-inspired decorations and furnishings. Le Cafe Arnold opened in the building in December 1940.

One of its first residents, opera singer Helen Jepson, signed a lease at 240 Central Park South soon after its completion. Another resident was the author Antoine de Saint-Exupéry, who lived in Manhattan from 1941 to 1943 and resided at 240 Central Park South during that time. Samuel Solomon, a gangster better known as Sam Boston, was arrested at his home inside the building in 1943, and was charged and convicted of running an illegal gambling ring at his residence. A resident was killed in a gas explosion in her apartment in 1952, which caused a bomb scare that prompted a lockdown of the surrounding area.

In the late 20th century, actors Sylvia Miles, Angie Harmon, and Lou Jacobi also took up residence at 240 Central Park South. In addition, the building's own architect Albert Mayer lived in 240 Central Park South from 1975 until his 1981 death. The building was also shown in works of fiction, being the residence of Lois Lane in the 1978 film Superman, as well as a key setting in the 1957 film A Face in the Crowd. 240 Central Park Associates owned the building from its opening until May 1976, when the building was sold to Central Park South Associates, a company operated by real estate developer Sarah Korein. In 1988, Italian restaurant San Domenico opened inside 240 Central Park South.

==== 21st century ====
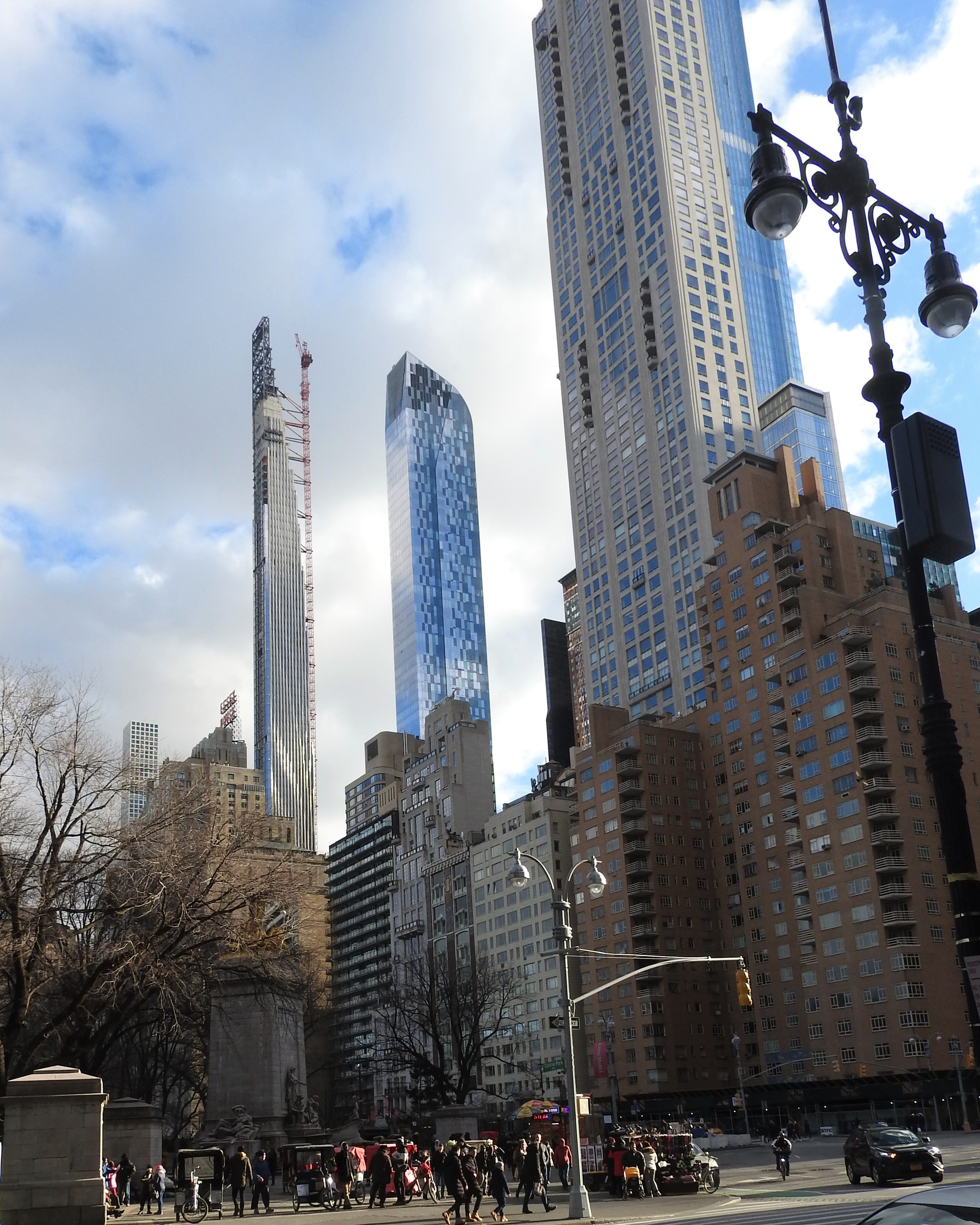
View of buildings along Central Park South as seen from across Columbus Circle. 240 Central Park South is at far right. Also visible are (from left to right): 111 West 57th Street, 200 Central Park South, One57, 220 Central Park South, and Central Park Tower.

In the 1990s, preservationists unsuccessfully attempted to create a Central Park South Historic District, encompassing properties on Central Park South between Fifth Avenue and Columbus Circle, including 240 Central Park South. By the first decade of the 21st century, the building was in disrepair; the facade bricks were in mismatched colors, while the courtyard had "shattered tiles and dry fountains", according to The New York Times. A group of preservationists, led by New York state senator Thomas Duane, started to advocate for official city landmark protection in 2001, with the commencement of major renovations at the building. Despite the fact that the Central Park South Historic District had been proposed a few years earlier, 240 Central Park South's historical significance had never been questioned, which had led to the failure of the historic district proposal. The building became a New York City designated landmark on June 25, 2002.

240 Central Park South's exteriors and public interior areas were restored in 2007. The renovation included a green roof designed by Balmori Associates as well as upgrades designed by Douglas J. Lister. The $25 million project received the New York Landmarks Conservancy's Lucy G. Moses Preservation Award for 2007. San Domenico closed its space inside 240 Central Park South in 2008, with Marea moving into that space the next year. The building was added to the National Register of Historic Places on May 12, 2009.

== Critical reception ==
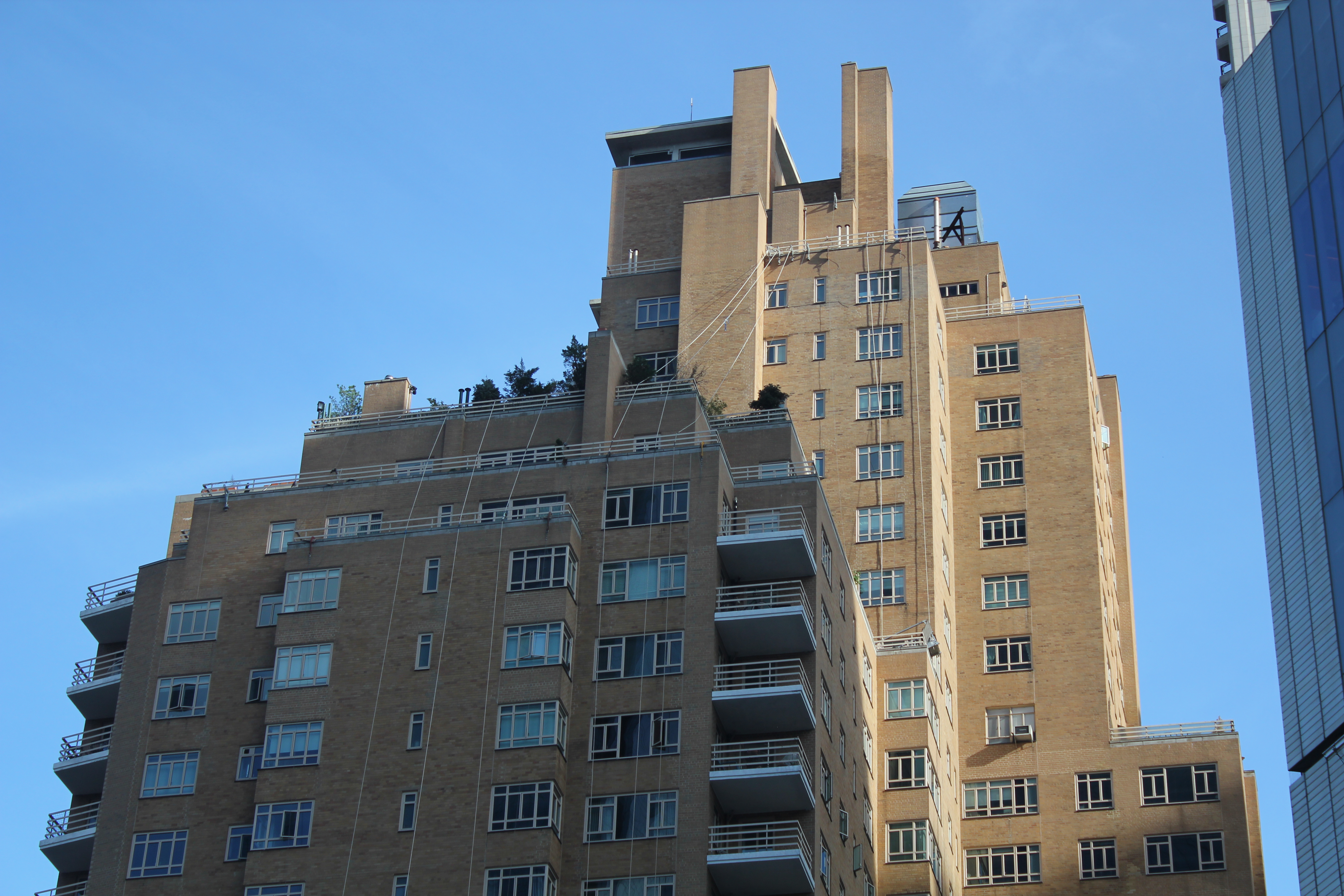
Close up of northern apartment block

240 Central Park South was one of the few mid-rise apartment buildings with courtyards to be constructed following the Great Depression, and was praised for its overall treatment. In 1940, the Museum of Modern Art's Guide to Modern Architecture said that the building's designers had given "particular attention to light, air, and view". The same year, architecture critic Lewis Mumford wrote for The New Yorker that 240 Central Park South was "a real success" and expressed admiration for the building's form, facade, balconies, windows, Broadway storefronts, and main entrance. Architectural Forum, the next year, stated that the design had "a host of improvements which taken together add up to one of the best apartment buildings yet produced", which could be attributed mainly to its improvements. Buildings and Building Management praised the landscaping as "ingenious" and commended the diversity of apartment layouts, which made every unit "a sort of penthouse".

More modern reviewers also praised 240 Central Park South as innovative, even if its design often went unnoticed. Paul Goldberger wrote in 1977 that 240 Central Park South, while "often overlooked", had apartments that were "well organized and a far cry from the cramped layouts" of that era. Goldberger also called the building "a remarkably sophisticated design" for its time, with its varied apartment layouts, Broadway storefronts, and park views. In 1980, architectural historian Robert A. M. Stern wrote that the building was a paradigm of the contextually responsible high-rise apartment in Manhattan". In his subsequent book New York 1930, Stern called the building "a synthetic work that was at once infill and icon", despite what he saw as shortfalls in the building's courtyard and "bland facade". As early as 1996, Stern had suggested that 240 Central Park South was a viable candidate for official landmark status. Martin Filler, writing for The New Republic in 2000, described 240 Central Park South as Columbus Circle's best structure, saying: "This stylish exemplar of high-density urbanism, completed just before civilian construction halted with our entry into World War II, has never been superseded."

== See also ==
- Art Deco architecture of New York City
- List of New York City Designated Landmarks in Manhattan from 14th to 59th Streets
- National Register of Historic Places listings in Manhattan from 14th to 59th Streets
