= Albert Mayer (planner) =

American planner and architect

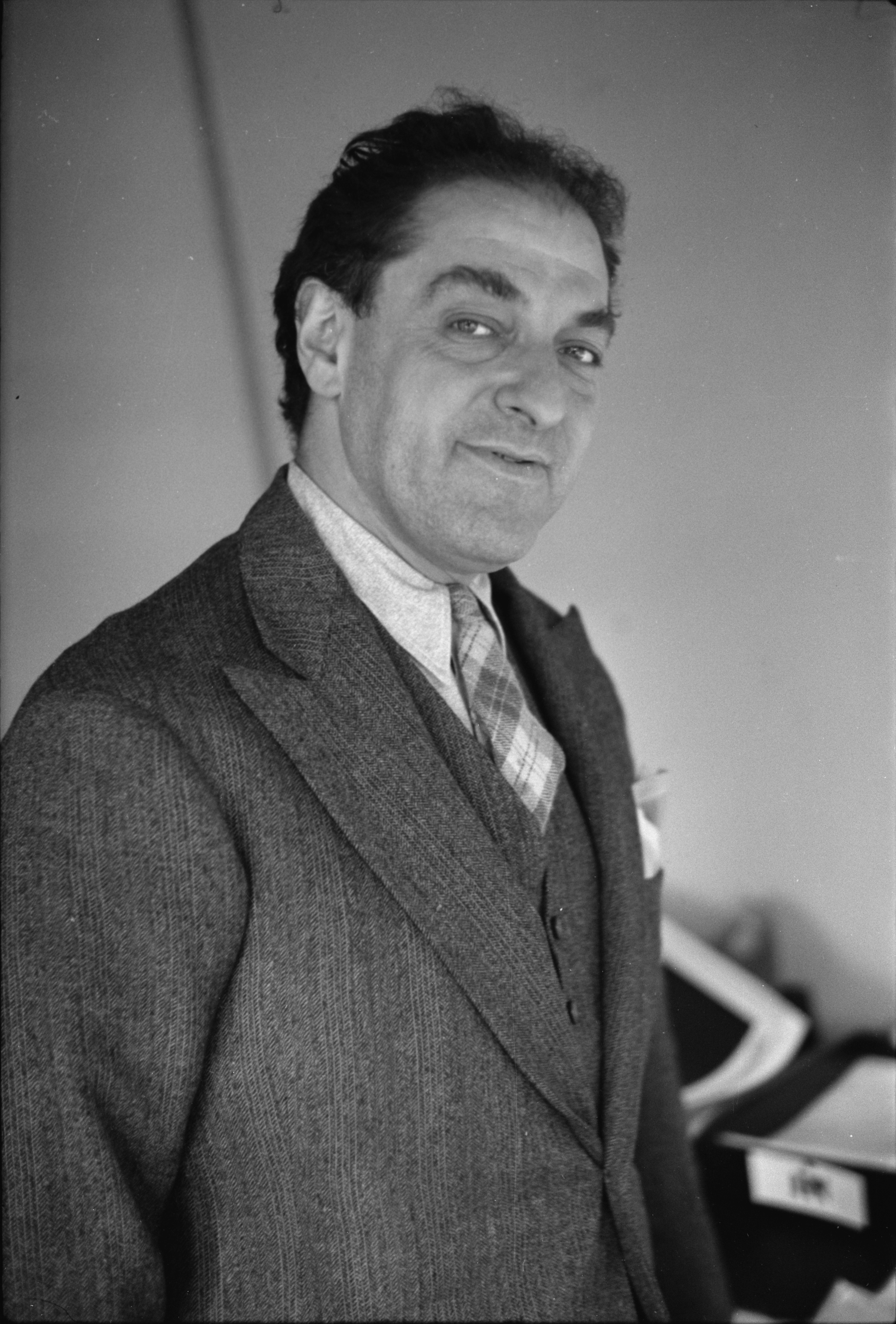
- Mayer photographed by Carl Mydans, 1936
- Born: December 29, 1897; New York City, United States
- Died: October 14, 1981 (aged 83); New York City
- Education: Columbia University; Massachusetts Institute of Technology
- Occupations: Planner, architect
- Known for: Plan of Chandigarh

Albert Mayer (December 29, 1897 – October 14, 1981) was an American planner and architect. He is well known for his contribution to American new town development and his innovative planning work in India, including the master plan of Chandigarh, the new capital of the Indian Punjab. Mayer practiced as an architect in New York City post-1935, as an engineer stationed in India for the U.S. Army during World War II, and a planner and consultant after the war.

== Early life and education ==
Mayer was born in New York City and attended Columbia University and then Massachusetts Institute of Technology, where he received a degree in engineering in 1919. After working for several years post-graduation in the civil engineering sector, Mayer became interested in the social ramifications of design and a few years later, he became a registered architect.

Mayer was said to be "one of a group of socially oriented architects, planners and urban theorists, including Lewis Mumford, Clarence Stein and Henry Wright." With Mumford and Wright, Mayer co-founded the Housing Study Guild, a group of design professionals that explored rapid urbanization at the turn of the 20th century. This group was publicly funded and studied different typologies of public housing.

Mayer returned to Columbia University after he retired from the professional world to teach.

== Architectural work ==
Albert Mayer designed many large-scale apartment buildings in New York and was a senior partner at Mayer, Whittlesey & Glass, an architecture firm started in 1935. Mayer worked on large-scale housing projects and his interest and involvement to this sector ultimately led the US Government to change their housing policy in the 1930s thus establishing the United States Housing Authority in 1937.

Mayer designed many apartment buildings in Manhattan. He also served as a consultant for large-scale housing projects all around the country from Cleveland to San Antonio to Miami.

== Planning work ==
When Mayer was not working in New York, he was a consultant in a variety of international settings. Mayer served as a planning consultant in places like British Columbia, Israel, and India. He believed that it was the duty of planners to "bring order to the urban landscape." Mayer believed that new towns were a solution to the sprawling, organically grown cities of the prior age. Like many of his contemporaries, including Lewis Mumford and Clarence Stein, Mayer saw a solution in planning that prevented rapid growth and industrialization. He believed that planned cities could meet all of the social needs of the new generation and Mayer was given this very task in the case of Chandigarh.

Mayer began his work in India well before the inception of Chandigarh. During World War II, Mayer was abroad in India (after he served in the United States and North Africa) where he worked as an engineer for the U.S. Army. He became enamored with Indian culture and proposed several new town schemes for rural, Indian villages.

In 1945 Mayer met Jawaharlal Nehru in India and discussed a plan for "model villages" that would establish "good housing, sanitation, and community structure. Beginning in 1946, he developed a pilot development project in rural Etawah, India. This project aimed to improve the quality of life for rural Indians and Mayer focused the plan around designing in such a way that fostered social and economic prosperity for the rural villagers through "inner democratization." The development planning work from the Etawah pilot project was repeated throughout rural India and Mayer was appointed Planning Advisor to the Uttar Pradesh Government in 1947.

Mayer was brought on to the Chandigarh project in 1949 because of his personal relationship with Nehru, who believed Indian engineers and architects would be unsuited to the task of town planning. During his work on the development and planning of the new capital city of Chandigarh, Mayer developed a superblock based-city threaded with green spaces which emphasized the cellular neighborhood and traffic segregation. His site plan used natural characteristics, using its gentle grade to promote drainage and rivers to orient the plan. Mayer discontinued his work on Chandigarh after developing a master plan from the city when his architect-partner Matthew Nowicki died in a plane crash in 1950. Government officials recruited Le Corbusier to succeed Mayer and Nowicki, who utilised many elements of Mayer's original plan without attributing them to him.

After Mayer's work on Chandigarh he continued to plan new towns like Kitimat (British Columbia). At Nehru's behest, he was recruited by the Ford Foundation to lead development of the first post-colonial Delhi Master Plan in the last 1950s. The plan, intended for 1962, intended to decongest Old Delhi, increase density in the formerly British areas of New Delhi and Civil Lines, redistribute industrial development to peripheral areas, and designate space for new public and not-for-profit institutions.

In 1961, Mayer retired at the age of 74.

Albert Mayer was designated a National Planning Pioneer by the American Planning Association in 2000.

== Notable projects ==
=== Architecture ===
- Butterfield House, 37 West 12th St, Greenwich Village, Manhattan
- 240 Central Park South, Manhattan
- Manhattan House of 1950 (with Skidmore, Owings & Merrill)
- 333 E 69th St (with William J. Conklin and James Rossant), Manhattan
- East Harlem Plaza, Manhattan

=== Planning ===
- Uttar Pradesh Pilot Development Project
- Uttar Pradesh General Community Development
- Chandigarh Master Plan
- Allahabad Agricultural Institute Master Plan
- Maumelle, Arkansas Master Plan
- Gujarat University Master Plan
- Kanpur Master Plan
- Consultant on the Master Plan for Greater Bombay (1947)

== Ideas ==
American New Town Development During the 1930s Mayer made the case against suburban sprawl. Mayer's hypothesis was tested and by 1930 his belief that unregulated suburban sprawl would ultimately put too much pressure on transportation and degrade the rural countryside.

Public Participation Mayer believed that citizens should be involved in the planning process. In 1946 Mayer insisted direct participation in the planning process, much earlier than others in the profession.

The Urgent Future Mayer published his book, The Urgent Future, in 1967. The Urgent Future aimed to reveal the misuse of statistics in the planning profession in order to justify the past actions' continuation into the future. Mayer believed in the power of the planner to fundamentally alter and bring order to the city. In The Urgent Future, Mayer noted, "Trend is not destiny" while defining a "megalopolis" as "the oozing together of already amorphous cities into a sort of lava flow hundreds of miles in dimensions."

== Personal life ==
Mayer was married to Phyllis Carter, and then divorced. His second wife was Marion Mill Preminger, who died in 1972. Mayer last married Magda Pastor.

He had three children, Stella Staltonstall, Kerry Mayer and Rafael Pastor.

Mayer died in 1981 due to coronary arrest at his home in Manhattan at age 83.
