= James Huniford =

American designer

James Huniford or Ford Huniford is an American designer. After founding his own design firm Huniford Design Studio, his ensuing work within the residential design built his reputation in New York with work appearing in Architectural Digest, W Magazine, Vogue, the New York Times, and Elle Decor. He was chosen by New York Spaces as a 'Top 50' designer of 2015 and was among Elle Decor's 2016 and 2011 'A-List's stating his work as "decorating at its most muscular and glamorous".

Ford Huniford has worked with a long list of notables over the years, including Linda Wells, the Newhouse family, Vera Wang, Anna Wintour, and Tina Turner.

== Influences and Work ==
From his childhood in upstate New York, Ford developed a strong affinity for the forms and scale of American industrial craftsmanship. His designs combine found objects with refined materials, often centred around singular objects such as whale bones or oversized gears. Calm wall colours are a recurring feature of his interiors, used to draw focus to the objects, art, and furniture within a space.

In 2003, he published Dwellings: Living with Great Style with Michael Boodro, editor and chief for Elle Decor.

In 2008, he founded James Huniford Design Studio and interior design firm located in the Chelsea neighborhood of New York City.

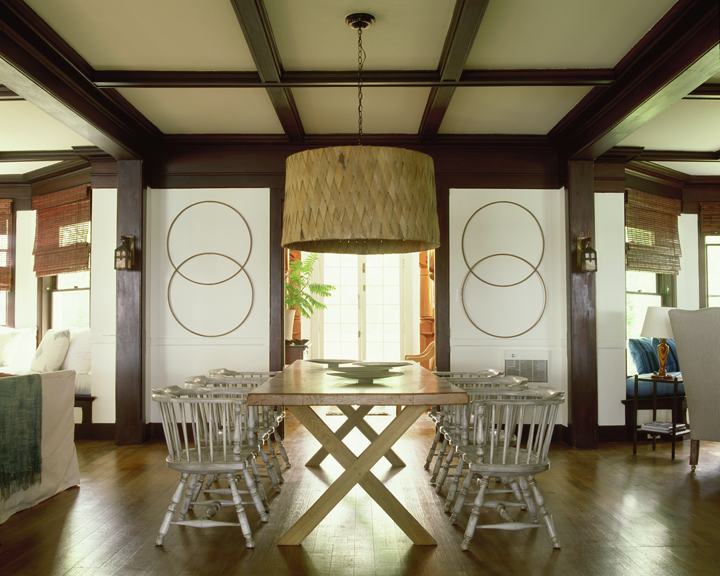
Interior of Upstate New York Home

In 2020, he published At Home with The Monacelli Press.

=== Huniford Collection ===
In 2013, Huniford released the Huniford Collection, a furniture collection made up of the type of pieces the designer previously created only as one-offs for his high-profile clients. T Magazine states "The designs, Huniford says, are meant to be “user-friendly” — scale and contemporary livability are paramount, and dimensions, as well as upholstery, are all customizable. This is furniture that inhabits that elegant territory somewhere between modern and classic." Elle Decor suggests the relationship between the collections eclecticism and elegance stating, "The entire collection has a formal elegance and a delicate, muted palette of grays and blues. By reinterpreting and re-purposing various styles, Huniford infuses each piece with character and functionality."

=== Upholstery line for Lee Jofa ===
In 2014, Huniford created a fabric line for home furnishing maker Lee Jofa. In his first fabric collection for Lee Jofa, created for Lee Jofa's Express range, attempts to create an option that provides optimal quality while balancing time constraints. Architectural Digest states "common in today’s need-it-now world—where waiting weeks for upholstery isn’t an option. The majority of Huniford’s line, part of the new Lee Jofa Express range, is available to ship within seven days of ordering. Most of the fine velvets, nubby bouclés, sleek sateens, and heavy linens are textured solids, with a few striped and chevron patterns for good measure."

== Style ==
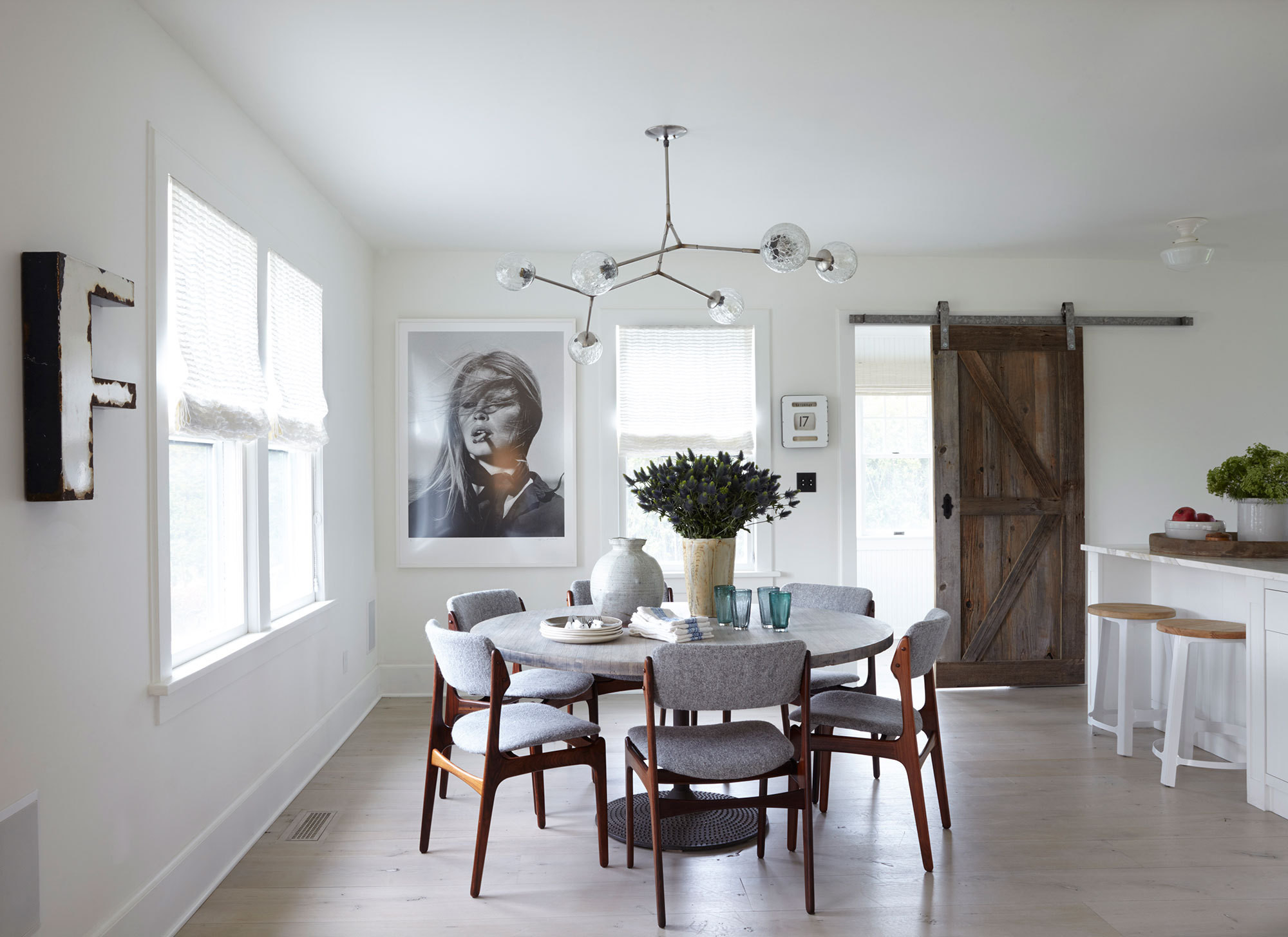
A Huniford designed interior in the Hamptons

Huniford is known for use of a calm, muted palette and interiors designed for motion. Elle Decor describes this openness for movement as "Huniford is known for creating graceful, unified spaces that allow individual furnishings to sing. His tranquil rooms seamlessly combine an eclectic mix of pieces that project comfort without sacrificing style." House and Garden describes his process for achieving this result in a Hamptons home, "[Huniford] uncovered the original floorboards and beams in the main sitting room, including a large steel cross-beam that had been introduced at some point in the history of the building. A number of walls were removed downstairs to create a more free-flowing layout". Spaces often use one paint color for the whole house, lending the interiors a strong degree of 'calm cohesion'.

He is known for his blending of contemporary and vintage pieces, creating spaces of 'dynamic tension'. As Anthony Iannacci describes in Design in the Hamptons, "there no singular, rigorous guideline for the origins of the furnishings or art. Instead, pieces of all periods crop up in every room, helping to establish a tension between what is precious and what is not. A contemporary artwork composed of seven wooden hoops commands a wall in the den, for example, while a metal fan belt cover from a long-since-decommissioned tractor, a larger-than-life yellow pencil, and Robert Rauschenberg lithographs hang in the living room." Iannacci emphasizes that this tension is a central feature to the power of Huniford's design as he "plays adroitly with all these conflicting narratives while still maintaining a sense of order and elegance" creating spaces full of 'surprise and wonder'.

== Personal life ==
He is also very active in a number of charities in New York, most notably he is the founding chair of the Housing Works "Design on a Dime" an annual fundraiser that brings together designers from all over New York to design room vignettes which are sold with all the proceeds benefiting Housing Works, a non-profit fighting the twin crises of AIDS and homelessness.
