= Butterfield House (New York City) =

Apartment building in Manhattan, New York

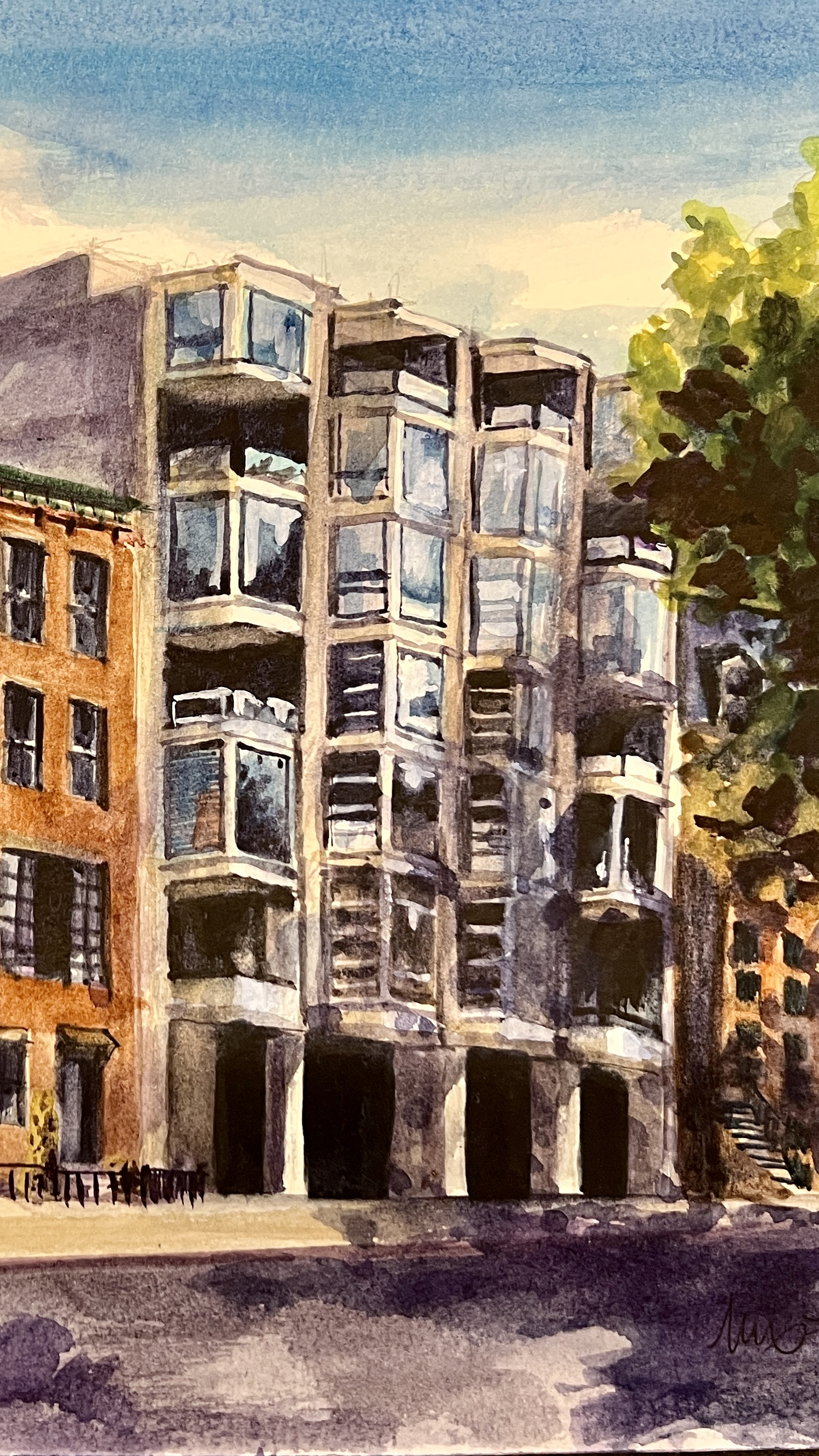
- Water color view from West 12th Street
- Interactive map of the Butterfield House area

General information
- Architectural style: Mid-Century Modern
- Location: 37 West 12th Street, Manhattan, New York City, NY 10011; United States
- Coordinates: 40°44′08″N 73°59′44″W
- Completed: 1962

Technical details
- Floor count: 12 with one penthouse floor

Design and construction
- Architects: William J. Conklin and James Rossant while at Mayer, Whittlesey & Glass
- Main contractor: Daniel L. Gray, Dangray Construction

Butterfield House is a cooperative apartment building on West 12th Street in the Greenwich Village neighborhood of Manhattan, New York City. It was designed by the architects and urban planners William J. Conklin and James Rossant, then of Mayer, Whittlesey & Glass. It is situated between Fifth Avenue and Sixth Avenue within the Greenwich Village Historic District. The building was described in The New York Times as "a modernist landmark" that "received numerous accolades when it was built in 1962".

Mimi Sheraton referred to it as "one of the Village’s most coveted residences." Architectural critic Paul Goldberger included Butterfield House on his list of the “10 Top Postwar Apartment Buildings” in New York City.

The building shares the block of West 12th Street with historic townhouses and when the street received its landmark designation in 1969 it was described as "one of the most distinguished examples of street architecture of the mid-nineteenth century."

== Architecture ==
"The delicacy of form and elegance of detail, inherent in the design, make [Butterfield House] as one with its residential neighbors."

— New York City Landmarks Preservation Commission, 1969

Butterfield House is an example of the International Style and Mid-Century Modern architectural styles and was designed by the architects William J. Conklin and James Rossant. Both men were acolytes of Walter Gropius who they studied under at the Harvard Graduate School of Design. Gropius, founder of the Bauhaus School, is widely regarded as one of the pioneering masters of modernist architecture.

Rossant's obituary in the New York Times states, "Butterfield House was hailed as a model of how to integrate modern architecture into a historic townhouse district."

The Municipal Art Society awarded Mayer, Whittlesey & Glass a Certificate of Merit in 1963 for its work on the Butterfield House.

The building has been referred to as "[one] of Manhattan's finest postwar apartment buildings". In 2016, the building was included on a list of thirteen "Architectural Masterpieces" that you can live in.

The building is notable for its deep bay windows, historic brown-brick façade, and floor-plan design where many of the units are floor-through apartments that offer views of the street on one side and the landscaped inner gardens and fountains on the other. The majority of the apartments have balconies or terraces facing the inner garden. Originally consisting of 102 apartments, including multiple penthouses, apartments have been combined over the years and Butterfield House now has fewer than 100 units. The architectural height of the building is 78.03 metres (256.0 ft). The Post-War Modern building's rear entrance address is on West 13th Street.

The AIA Guide to NYC calls it "The friendly neighborhood high rise", and the NYC Landmarks Preservation Commission cites it as an example of "urban harmony" between modern architecture and older forms.

== Name ==
The building was named after Union Civil War General and Medal of Honor recipient Daniel Butterfield. General Butterfield is credited with composing Taps, the bugle call played by the United States Armed Forces at dusk, during flag ceremonies, and at military funerals. The building sits on the site of his former home on 12th Street.

== Notable residents ==
Current and former notable residents of the Butterfield House:

- Neil Blumenthal – Co-Founder and current Co-CEO of Warby Parker.
- Ramsey Clark – United States Attorney General under President Lyndon B. Johnson.
- Jack Feldman - Tony Award winning lyricist. Wrote the lyrics for Barry Manilow's Grammy Award winning song "Copacabana".
- David Garroway – first anchor of NBC's Today Show.
- Tony Geiss – Noted Sesame Street screenwriter and songwriter. Writer and producer of American Tail - a resident until his death in 2011.
- Erica Katz – Author of popular fiction books including The Boys Club and Fake.
- Stanley Kunitz – United States Poet Laureate and longtime resident until his death at the age of 101.
- Adam Lippes – fashion designer.
- George Lois – Advertising creative director, designer, and author. Famous for his Esquire magazine covers and allegedly the inspiration for the character Don Draper on the television show Mad Men.
- Ariel Pakes – Frisch Medal winning economist. A professor at Harvard University, he is famous for the Berry Levinsohn Pakes (BLP) approach to demand estimation and the Olley and Pakes approach to estimation of production functions.
- Henry Van Ameringen – Noted gay rights activist and philanthropist through the Van Ameringen Foundation. Founding family of International Flavors and Fragrances.
