= Arpels =

Arpels is a surname. Notable people with the surname include:

- Hélène Arpels (1907–2006), Monaco-born French model, shoe designer, and retailer, wife of Louis
- Louis Arpels (1886–1976), Dutch/French jeweler
