= Hampshire House =

Skyscraper in Manhattan, New York

Coordinates: 40°45′58″N 73°58′41″W

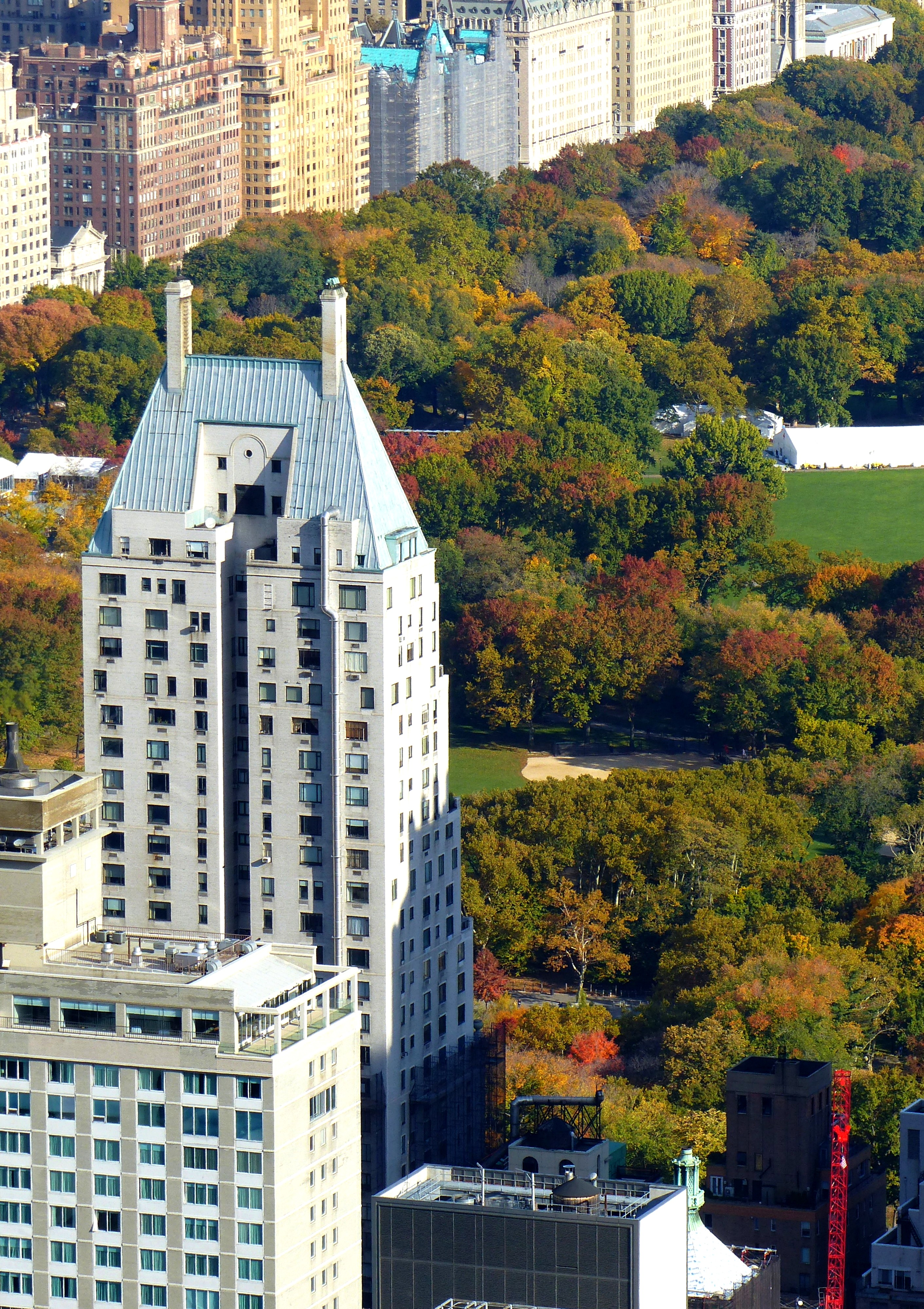
View from 30 Rockefeller Plaza

Hampshire House is an apartment building and hotel located at 150 Central Park South in Manhattan, New York City, on the southern edge of Central Park between Sixth and Seventh Avenues. It contains 155 apartments on 36 floors.

== History ==
=== Origins ===
The building now known as New York City's Hampshire House was the brainchild of an Italian immigrant, Eugene E. Lignante, who came to America in 1891 on the SS Cheribon at the age of 11 with his parents. As a child, he was a talented violinist and working musician who is described in newspapers as having the ability to draw crowds. As an adult Eugene grew to manage and direct several orchestras, playing at events and upscale hotels. In 1913, prior to the United States entering WWI, he moved to Montreal, Canada to help open the Ritz Carlton Hotel. While in Canada, he secretly worked with Col. Wesley Allison and Benjamin Yoakum to quietly help supply and ship ammunitions for the UK. In May, 1915 the sinking of the Lusitainia shocked the United States into publicly joining the allies in WWI. When he returned to the United States, Eugene saw the increasing development of high-rise structures in the city during the early 20th century. He changed career paths working in real estate, building and construction. In December 1925, Eugene hired architect Rollin Caughey to design a 39-story Art Deco tower at 154 West 58th Street, called the Medici Tower.

In the fall of 1925, "Eugene E. Lignante of Lignante & Udall, contractors, purchased direct from Mr. Winter for $1,750,000 the two easterly units of the flats having a frontage of 107 feet adjoining Mr. Brown's parcel. On the Fifty-ninth Street side of his parcel Mr.Lignante proposes to erect a forty-story building to be devoted exclusively to doctors' suites and labora-tories, while on the Fifty-eighth Street side he will build a nine-story apartment hotel. These two improvements Will be erected at a combined cost of $4,000,000." ( The New York Times 1926-10-03: Vol 76 Iss 25089 ) In 1927, Lignante and Udall dissolved while Eugene continued to work on the completion of The Hampshire House.

With the onset of the Great Depression forcing his hand, Eugene joined forces to help form the H. K. (H. K.) Ferguson & Co.-Contracts.- "A contract for the construction of a 34-stoey stores and apartment hotel building at New York City, Involving an expenditure of $3,000.000, has Property for the building. Central Park South between 6th and 7th Avenues, has been purchased from the South Central Park Corp. First mortgage for construction has been placed with the New York Title & Mortgage Co. Actual work is expected to begin about Oct. 15. Hotel Meurice. Inc. a New York corporation recentiv organized. will own the bullding. Officers and directors of the corporation are: Harold K. Ferguson, Cleveland, President: Joe. B. 1 8. Ruble, Cleveland Vice-Pres.: Cleveland. Vice.-Pres.; Eugene E. Lignante, New York, Secretary: Frank H. Davol Jr. Stamford, Conn. Treasurer. (See also Park Square Real Estate Trust.—V. 130, p. 4424.)"

After the Wall Street Crash of 1929, numerous incomplete projects in New York City proceeded (including 330 West 42nd Street, the Carlyle Hotel, London Terrace, and The Majestic), but the Medici project was postponed. The new owners, H. K, Ferguson Company of Cleveland, Ohio, were forced to allow the building to remain unfinished. In the final redesign, Caughey and Evans created a new plan: an apartment hotel with 34 floors, called Central Park Suites. Caughey and Evans created a balance between traditional and modern architecture in the building, which was renamed Hampshire House. The New York Times described it as “an adaptation to the modern tall building of the Georgian style such as is found in many old homes in the County of Hampshire, England. The exterior will be a black and white chromium steel.” The Central Park South building was envisioned as a narrow tower with a dome, but the plans were changed to a 36-story apartment hotel in the Regency and Art Deco styles. Later, the tower piqued the interest of the Architectural League of New York which, as a result, attracted a lot of attention throughout the country.

==== Foreclosure ====
By late 1930, a contract for 3,770 short tons (3,370 long tons; 3,420 t) of structural steel had been awarded for the building's construction. The developers field plans for Hampshire House in early 1931, and the New York Title and Mortgage Company gave the builders a construction loan of $2.2 million in March 1931. Hampshire House's cornerstone was laid during a ceremony on March 24, 1931. That July, the New York Title and Mortgage Company sued to foreclose on the property, claiming that the main contractor had quit just before the building was completed. The New York Supreme Court appointed a receiver to collect rent for the building, but there was no rent to collect.

With the onset of the Great Depression, the building stood unfinished for many years. New York Title and Mortgage, who had sought $3 million for the property, had only received a single bid of $800,000. The company bought the hotel at a foreclosure auction in June 1933 for $100,000; the sale represented a loss of nearly $2.4 million. They hired Caughey and Evans again to continue with their plan.

New York Title and Mortgage itself went bankrupt, and Hampshire House joined a group of buildings in the area with "Series C-2 guaranteed mortgage certificates" that had defaulted on mortgages from the New York Title and Mortgage Company. The C-2 properties were rescued by New York Supreme Court justice Alfred Frankenthaler, who appointed three trustees for the C-2 properties in April 1936. The trustees immediately began devising ways to turn the abandoned Hampshire House into an income-producing property. The trustees started negotiating to sell Hampshire House in August 1936, and the court favored this plan. Later that year, the trustees sought $1.45 million to complete Hampshire House. In December 1936, the court ordered that the trustees complete the building themselves, as they could not find any buyers willing to pay the minimum of $1 million for the property.

=== Operation ===
Hampshire House was listed as a new way of luxurious living of suites, and proximity to a lot of the most famous amusement sites. The previous trustees of Hampshire House sold it to the Kirkeby Group in 1946. The Kirkeby group controlled a lot of other prestigious hotels around the country. Later, they merged with Hilton chain.

Hampshire House no longer offers short-term stays; its units are cooperatively owned apartments. The building has been known for its architecture and location.

== Architecture ==
=== Interiors ===
The trustees hired Dorothy Draper, an interior designer, in order to make people want to live in a building which was at some point an empty shell on one of the most visible streets. According to The New York Times, the rooms featured "daring contrasts of black, white and turquoise, overscale plaster carving, mirrors and glass block and extraordinary door moldings of cast clear glass". Draper envisioned the building as a traditional London townhouse. She included a small lobby, and a garden with a fountain and pool to create the atmosphere of a Georgian townhouse in Britain. She also designed a restaurant within the building called “The Cottage,” which soon became one of New York's well-known party rooms.

==== The Cottage Room ====
This room was a major venue for luxurious events like wedding receptions, dinners, luncheons and other celebrations. There were several famous celebrations including: Bee Gees performance in 1971, Eubie Blake’s 90th birthday party, Calvin Klein’s wedding. The cottage completely closed in 1986.

=== Publications ===
Hampshire House opened on October 16, 1937. The New York Times ad campaign noted: “New York’s newest exclusive apartment hotel - has the entire length of Central Park as its footstool - suggests a London town house in a Hyde Park setting.”

Hampshire House appeared in many magazines and guides in New York. Architectural Record posted a photo of Hampshire House's lobby in January 1938. Lawton Mackall said: "decor by Dorothy Draper creates [the] illusion that this is [the] dining room of a fabulous country estate looking out through [the] orangerie." Craig Clairborne said it had "one of New York's most stylish dining rooms."

== Services and amenities ==
Hampshire House used to have a florist shop—and not just any florist shop: it was run by Beatrice Mann, "florist to the stars," who operated the shop for more than 40 years. There were also a barber shop and beauty salon, which closed because they became unnecessary. As the hotel was evolving to a high-end cooperative, "turndown" service became optional.

Hampshire House replaced a newsstand in its lobby—as seen in many hotels—to direct New York Times delivery to each resident in the co-op.

Entirely new services have been introduced like a gym, car services for residents, and a pianist who plays twice a week in the lobby.

== Residents and guests ==
Some of the residents at Hampshire House stayed for a short time, as it also functioned as a regular hotel, while others were long-term residents.

=== Early residents ===
Some of the first residents in the building, according to the New York Times included Ann Morgan, Rodman Wanamaker 2nd, Edward Rice, and Charles Warren. Ray Bolger leased an apartment at Hampshire House in 1940.

=== Guests ===
George Abbott stayed at Hampshire House during Broadway season. Other guests included Lucille Ball, Ingrid Bergman, John Wayne, Greta Garbo,Peter Sellers, and Django Reinhardt. Marilyn Monroe stayed at Hampshire House for some time, with Joe DiMaggio.

Frank Sinatra and Ava Gardner were seen staying together at Hampshire House for the first time. The newspapers announced "Frank and Ava at the same hotel." Soon enough, Hampshire House was filled with reporters and paparazzi.

=== Residents ===
Jose Carreras, Plácido Domingo, and Luciano Pavarotti all lived at Hampshire House. Carreras bought his apartment in 1955, Pavarotti in 1983, and Domingo in 1977. Sophia Loren has lived at Hampshire House.

Boxer Barney Ross had an apartment at Hampshire House to store items during the state of Israel's establishment. Director William Wyler also lived at Hampshire House with his wife, Talli. Other residents include novelist Vladmir Nabokov, Art Garfunkel, Sonja Henie, and other notable celebrities. Julien Arpels, an heir to the Van Cleef & Arpels fortune, had his residence at Hampshire House and died in his apartment in 1964.
