= New Century Theatre =

Former theatre in Manhattan, New York

- Jolson's 59th Street Theatre (1921–31); Central Park Theatre (1931); Shakespeare Theatre (1932–34); Venice Theatre (1934–42); Jolson's 59th Street Theatre (1942); Molly Picon Theatre (1943); Jolson's 59th Street Theatre (1943); New Century Theatre (1944–54)
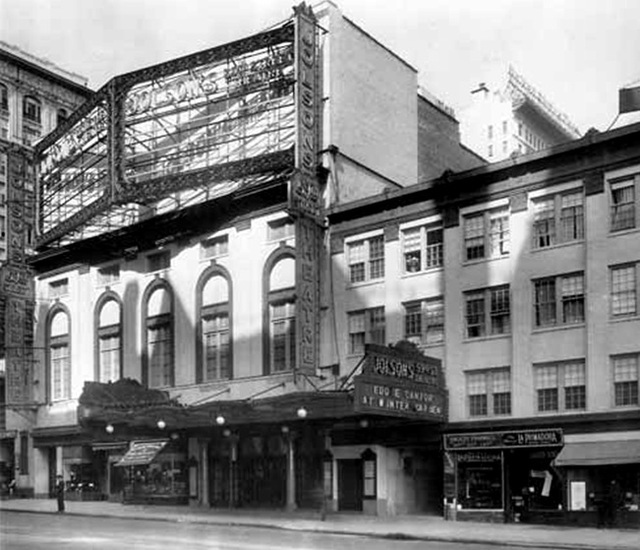
- Interactive map of New Century Theatre
- Address: 932 Seventh Avenue; New York City; United States
- Coordinates: 40.766495°N 73.97947°W
- Owner: Shubert Organization
- Capacity: 1,700
- Type: Broadway theatre

Construction
- Opened: October 6, 1921
- Closed: 1954
- Demolished: 1962
- Architect: Herbert J. Krapp

The New Century Theatre was a Broadway theater in the Midtown Manhattan neighborhood of New York City, at 205–207 West 58th Street and 926–932 Seventh Avenue. Opened on October 6, 1921, as Jolson's 59th Street Theatre, the theater was designed by Herbert J. Krapp on the site of the Central Park Riding Academy. It was built for the Shubert brothers, who named the house after Al Jolson.

In 1920, the Shuberts announced plans to convert the Central Park Riding Academy into a theater, hiring Krapp to renovate the old structure. The Shuberts went bankrupt in 1931 and sold off Jolson's 59th Street Theatre, in part because of the venue's remoteness from Times Square. The venue was then leased as a film house called the Central Park Theatre. It was then renamed five more times before assuming the "New Century" name in 1944. The theater was converted to an NBC broadcast studio in 1953, then to a videotape studio in 1958. Upon the theater's demolition in 1962, the apartment building at 200 Central Park South was erected on the site.
