= Gainsborough Studios (Manhattan) =

Residential building in Manhattan, New York

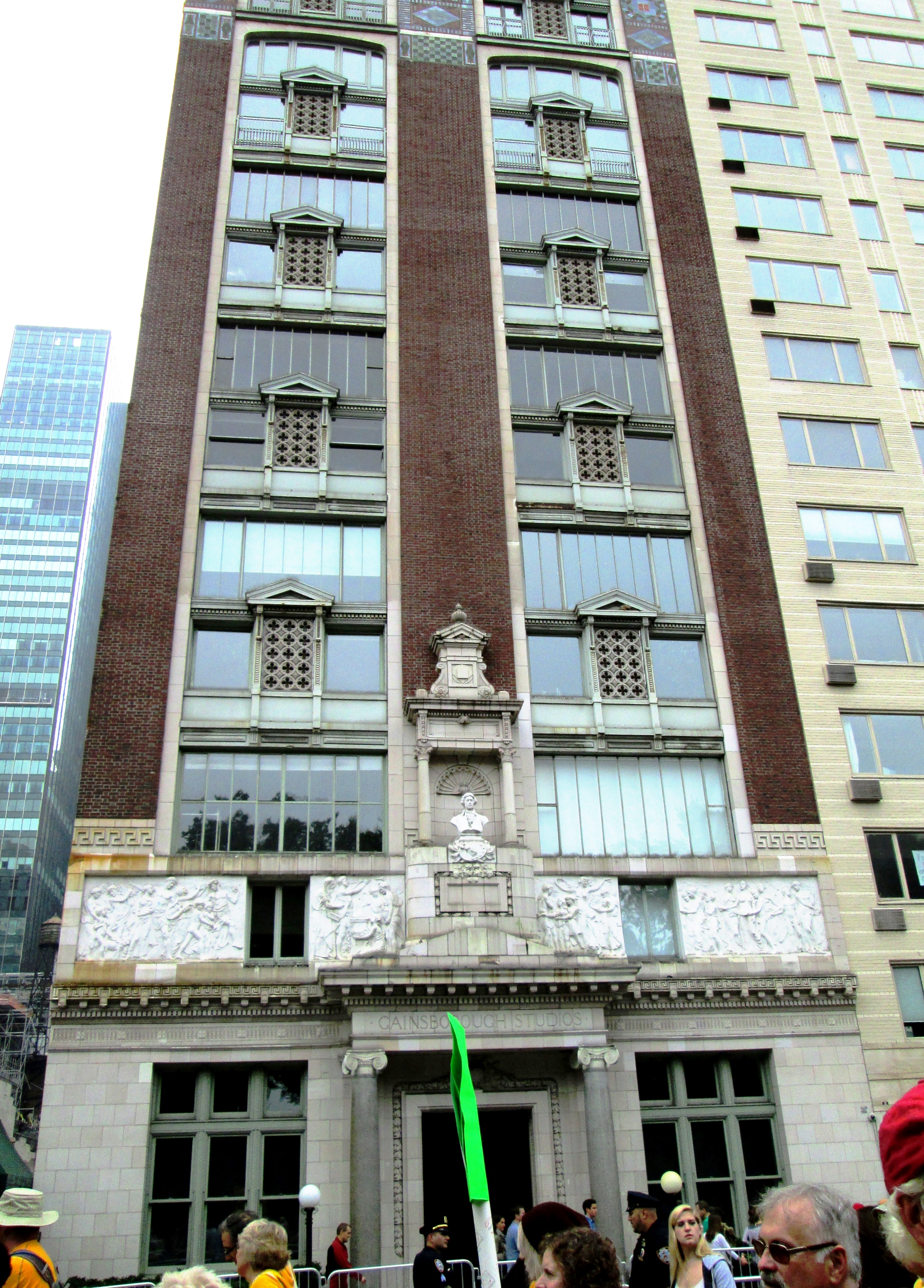
- Interactive map of the Gainsborough Studios area
- Alternative names: The Gainsborough

General information
- Type: Residential
- Location: 222 Central Park South, Manhattan, New York, United States
- Coordinates: 40°46′02″N 73°58′50″W
- Groundbreaking: 1907
- Opened: 1908

Height
- Height: 177.21 feet (54 m)

Technical details
- Floor count: 16

Design and construction
- Architect: Charles W. Buckham

Other information
- Number of units: 30

New York City Landmark
- Designated: February 15, 1988
- Reference no.: 1423

The Gainsborough Studios, also known as 222 Central Park South, is a residential building on Central Park South, just east of Columbus Circle, in the Midtown Manhattan neighborhood of New York City, United States. Designed by Charles W. Buckham, the building is 16 stories tall with 30 apartments. Named after English painter Thomas Gainsborough, the building is one of several in Manhattan that were built in the early 20th century as both studios and residences for artists.

The Gainsborough Studios' name and design indicated its artistic connotations. The facade contains a bust of Gainsborough above the main entrance; a bas-relief across the third floor, designed by Isidore Konti; and tile murals by Henry Chapman Mercer's Moravian Pottery and Tile Works at the top stories. Some studios have 18-foot (5.5 m) ceilings with double-height spaces, while others are smaller units that occupy part of a single floor. Artists generally rented the studios as a combination residence and working space.

The Gainsborough Studios corporation built the structure between 1907 and 1908 as artists' cooperative housing, although it gradually became a standard residential development. The lobby was restored in the 1950s and in 1981, and a full renovation of the building commenced in 1988. The building was designated a city landmark by the New York City Landmarks Preservation Commission in 1988.

== Site ==
The Gainsborough Studios is in the Midtown Manhattan neighborhood of New York City, just east of Columbus Circle. It is on the southern side of Central Park South between Seventh Avenue and Broadway, across from Central Park to the north. The Gainsborough Studios occupies a lot measuring 50 feet (15 m) on Central Park South and 88 feet (27 m) deep. Nearby buildings include 200 and 220 Central Park South to the east, 240 Central Park South to the west, and 1790 Broadway and the Central Park Tower to the south.

== Architecture ==
The Gainsborough Studios is 177.21 feet (54 m) tall and has 16 stories. (Note: The New York City Landmarks Preservation Commission classifies the building as having eight double stories. The upper story of each two-story section is treated as a mezzanine.) Charles W. Buckham was the architect, while Wells Bros. Company was the general contractor. The artist August Franzen was the founding president of the Gainsborough Studios corporation, which developed the building. Franzen was a significant figure in the building's planning, and may have influenced the decision to name the building after English painter Thomas Gainsborough. The Gainsborough Studios' exterior design reflects both its interior furnishings and its purpose as an artists' studio, with numerous allusions to art in both its name and facade. It is one of a few artists' housing cooperatives remaining in Manhattan.

=== Facade ===
The first and second floors are faced with limestone. The entrance is set within a square doorway under a portico with the words gainsborough studios, which in turn is supported by a pair of white terracotta and granite Ionic columns. There is a double-height window to each side of the main entrance, with two stone mullions and a thick stone muntin in each window. A staircase to the basement is west of the entrance. Running across the third story is a bas-relief frieze by Isidore Konti called Procession of the Arts. The frieze depicts various people delivering gifts to an altar representing the arts, and contains two small windows. A plinth sits atop the entrance portico, supporting a bust of Thomas Gainsborough outside the fourth and fifth stories.

Above the second story, the building's facade is split into two vertical bays, flanked by three brick piers with stone reveals. The facade generally contains double-height windows facing Central Park South, which break up the facade into several double-story sections between the second and fifteenth floors. The lower portion of each double-story section features a quatrefoil panel and a small pediment at the center, flanked by a glass pane on each side. The upper portion of each double-story section, as well as the fourth floor, contains a large window divided into several sections by narrow mullions. The lower and upper portions of each double-height story are separated by narrow spandrel panels. An arch runs above each bay over the twelfth story.

Above the twelfth story, the piers are ornamented with tile mosaics by Henry Chapman Mercer's Moravian Pottery and Tile Works. The mosaics contain geometric patterns in red, yellow, green, and gray hues; the central pier contains more elaborate decoration compared to the outer piers. Atop the building is a corbel table with shell designs, as well as acroteria atop each pier.

=== Features ===
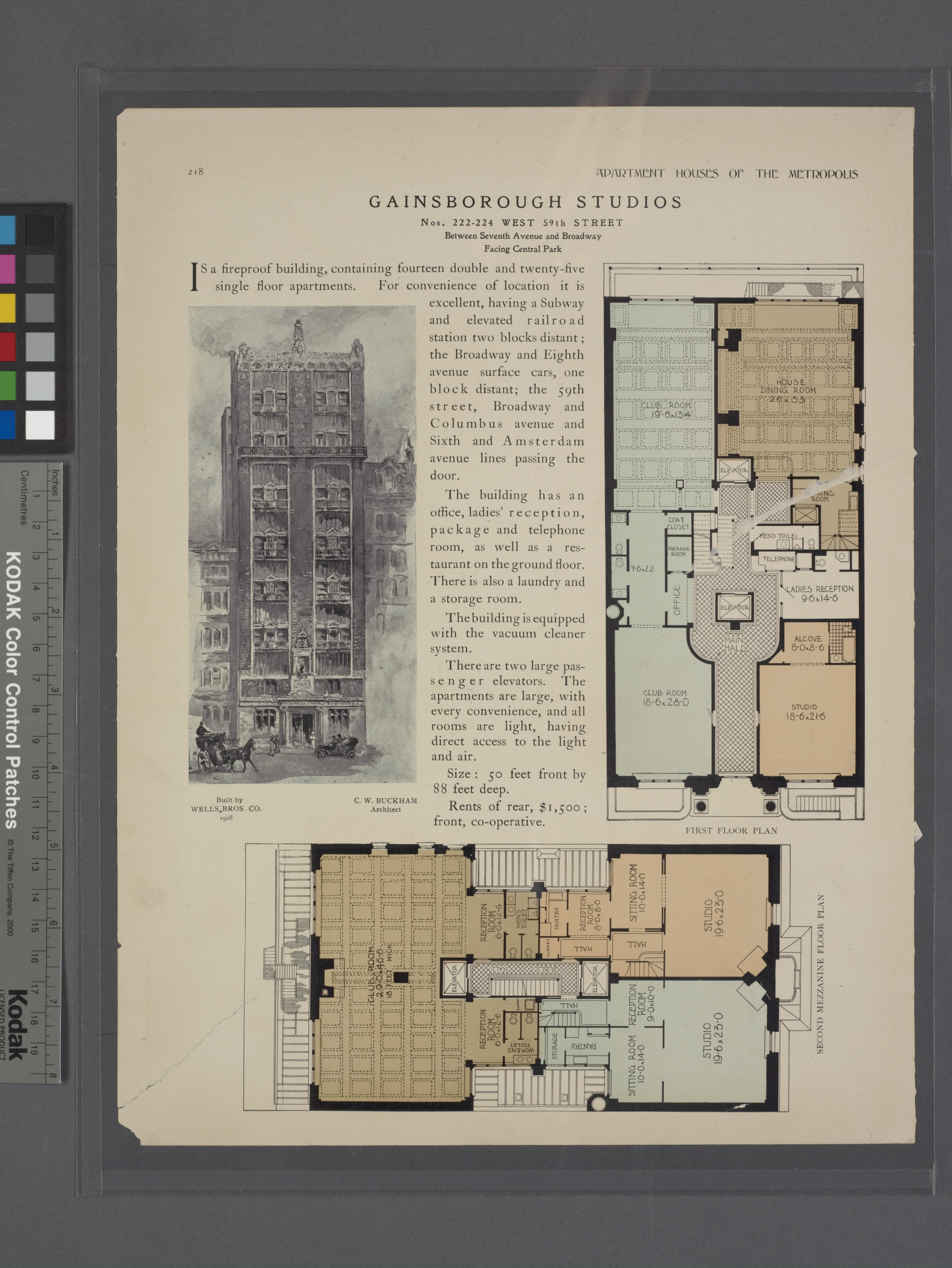
A typical double-story floor plan

The Gainsborough Studios contains 30 units as of 2025. The units were marketed to artists as a studio that could be used as living space. The building has a shared kitchen, laundry, and dining room, although individual units contain reception areas for clients. When completed, the building contained 14 duplex apartments and 25 single-floor apartments, for a total of 39 units.

The Gainsborough Studios was legally classified as a hotel to circumvent zoning restrictions that prevented new apartment buildings from being taller than 150 percent of the width of the adjacent street. As a result, there was a communal kitchen area at ground level, while individual apartments lacked full kitchens. There are two elevators and an emergency stair, flanking enclosure at the center of the building. As designed, the elevator at the northern end of the hall was the main passenger elevator, and the elevator at the southern end was used for freight.

Only the northern facade had natural light overlooking Central Park. Accordingly, the units on the building's northern side were equipped with 18-foot (5.5 m) ceilings and double-height windows, and thus contained the duplex suites. The other apartments were single-story units. On each floor pairing, there was two double-height duplex units on the north side and four single-story units on the south side, arranged around a central hallway with a fire staircase and two elevators. The duplex units contain a mezzanine overlooking the double-height studios along Central Park South. The second and third floors are irregular, in that the front sections of these floors contain duplex apartments, while the rear had restaurant space.

== History ==
=== Development ===
Cooperative apartment housing in New York City became popular in the late 19th century because of overcrowded housing conditions in the city's dense urban areas. By the beginning of the 20th century, there were some co-ops in the city that catered specifically to artists, including at 130 and 140 West 57th Street, as well as at the West 67th Street Artists Colony near Central Park. However, these were almost always fully occupied. Some of the artists' co-ops contained features such as double-height ceilings, while others like Gainsborough Studios contained large working areas illuminated by light from the north.

In 1907, businessman Barron Collier and artists Colin Campbell Cooper, Elliott Daingerfield, and August Franzen formed the Gainsborough Studios corporation, headquartered at 307 Fifth Avenue. The corporation would plan and develop an artists' cooperative apartment on Central Park South. The corporation bought tenements at 222 and 224 Central Park South in April 1907. Buckham was hired as architect, and that May, he filed plans with the New York City Department of Buildings for an eight-story fireproof artists' studio on the site, to cost $300,000. Wells Bros. Company was awarded the general construction contract in August 1907. Work started on November 3, 1907, after the existing building had been demolished. The new building officially opened on October 31, 1908.

=== Usage ===
Over the years, residents included artist Montague Flagg, sculptor William Ordway Partridge, and travel writer Thomas Allibone Janvier, as well as artist Enrico Donati. One resident of the Gainsborough Studios in the 1910s, John Hemming Fry, became a vice president of the Gainsborough Studios corporation and subsequently developed the nearby Rodin Studios using his experience from the Gainsborough Studios. During the 1950s, another resident, Donald Deskey, led a renovation of the building's lobby. As part of the project, the ornate iron doors from the original design were replaced with aluminum doors.

In 1981, the Gainsborough Studios Corporation spent $100,000 on renovating the lobby to its original condition, using historical photographs to create replicas of the original doors. The terracotta and tile facade degraded over time, and starting in 1988, the building was renovated for $1 million. The colored ceramic tiles were reproduced by hand, the terracotta was partially replaced, and the frieze was recast in concrete. The New York City Landmarks Preservation Commission also made the building an official city landmark in 1988, after the renovation had started. By 2004, the Gainsborough Studios had almost entirely become a standard residential structure, and Donati was the last artist remaining in the building. In the early 21st century, philanthropist Blaine Trump moved into the building as well.

The construction of the neighboring 220 Central Park South in the 2010s and early 2020s damaged the Gainsborough Studios' roof, windows, and mechanical systems. By 2023, the co-op was considering replacing the windows, which had cracked. The Gainsborough Studios' residents sued 220 Central Park South's developer, Vornado Realty Trust, for damages in 2025. The residents claimed that the construction of 220 Central Park South had caused the building to sink and lean to the east, causing the structural damage, and that they had spent $3 million to repair the building themselves. At the time, apartments at the Gainsborough Studios regularly sold for $1 million to $4 million.

== Critical reception ==
Upon its completion, the Gainsborough Studios' design was described as "a credit to the ingenuity of the designer". In 1977, architectural writer Paul Goldberger wrote for The New York Times that the facade of the Gainsborough Studios was "far more interesting than anything on 67th Street", praising the Ionic columns at the base and the mosaics at the top. Christopher Gray wrote for the same paper in 2013 that the building "constitute[d] the first recognition I have seen that the vista north to 110th Street was beginning to be considered special", reflecting on the development boom along Central Park South when the building was completed.

== See also ==
- List of New York City Designated Landmarks in Manhattan from 14th to 59th Streets
