= Claude Arpels =

American film producer

Claude Arpels Jr.
- Education: Columbia University (BA, MBA)
- Occupations: investor, entrepreneur
- Known for: heir to the Van Cleef & Arpels fortune
- Relatives: Julien Arpels (grandfather); Louis Arpels (great-uncle)

Claude Arpels Jr. is a French-American businessman, and investor who is the heir to the Van Cleef & Arpels fortune. He also owned the Italian brands Borbonese and Alessandro Dell'Acqua.

== Biography ==
Arpels was born to Claude Arpels, son of Julien Arpels, who headed the American operations of Van Cleef & Arpels and helped the firm establish a presence on Fifth Avenue since 1939.

At age 16, he was sent to Brunei by his mother, Malou, to sell jewelry to the Sultan of Brunei and his family.

In 1991, Arpels graduated from Columbia University with a bachelor's degree in history and comparative religions. He then joined the family firm upon the death of his father and the retirement of his uncle, Phillippe Arpels, who served as president of the firm from 1985 to 1991. Arpels departed the firm in 1993 and returned to investment banking, working in Rothschild & Co's corporate finance department, and earned his M.B.A. from Columbia Business School.

In 1999, the family sold 80% of its stake in Van Cleef & Arpels to Richemont and Fingen SpA, a Florentine holding company, and retained a 20% stake. Arpels returned to the firm to serve in management, tasked with restructuring the business.

In 2003, he sold the remaining 20% of the shares and focused his business on Italy, where he acquired the Redwall Group, a company that produces bags and accessories and owns Borbonese, a leather goods brand founded in Turin in 1910. He also bought 70% of Alessandro Dell'Acqua's eponymous fashion brand in 2003. In 2005, Arpels sold his company after failing to turn a profit.

He was the executive producer for On_Line, an independent film directed by Jed Weintrob, and premiered at the Sundance Film Festival in 2002.

Arpels is currently an activist investor with Slow Money NYC, a company he founded that emphasizes patient capital and investing in local community as opposed to focusing on quarterly earnings and profit maximization. He also serves the president of the board of directors of the International Contemporary Ensemble.

== Personal life ==
Arpels is married to Winsome Brown, a British-born actress and writer. The couple has two children and lives in Tribeca. Their loft, designed by Lee Mindel, has been a subject of many interior design and lifestyle magazines. It was also the venue for Whole Foods CEO John Mackey's book launch party in 2013.
