= Hélène Arpels =

French model and shoe designer

- Born: Hélène Ostrowska; 1907; Monte Carlo, Monaco
- Died: 2006 (aged 98–99)
- Occupation(s): Model, shoe designer and retailer
- Spouse: Louis Arpels (m. 1933, divorced)
- Partner: Andre Azria (d. 2001)

Hélène Arpels (née Ostrowska; 1907–2006) was a French model, the wife of jeweler Louis Arpels, and later a shoe designer and retailer in New York. She was known for her catch phrase "Diamonds go with everything" and was on the annual "10 Best Dressed List" for more than a decade. Shoes designed by Arpels are in the permanent collection of the Metropolitan Museum of Art's Costume Institute.

== Early life ==
Hélène Ostrowska was born in Monte Carlo, Monaco, in 1907, the daughter of Ukrainian-Polish parents, Michel Ostrowsky and Cécile Werblovska. Her older sister, Eugénie, was born in 1905.

In 1933, she was working as a fashion model for the House of Worth, when she married the jeweler Louis Arpels of Van Cleef & Arpels.

In August 1940, they sailed on one of the last war-time liners bound for the United States. In New York City, they established the American branch of the business.

== Career ==
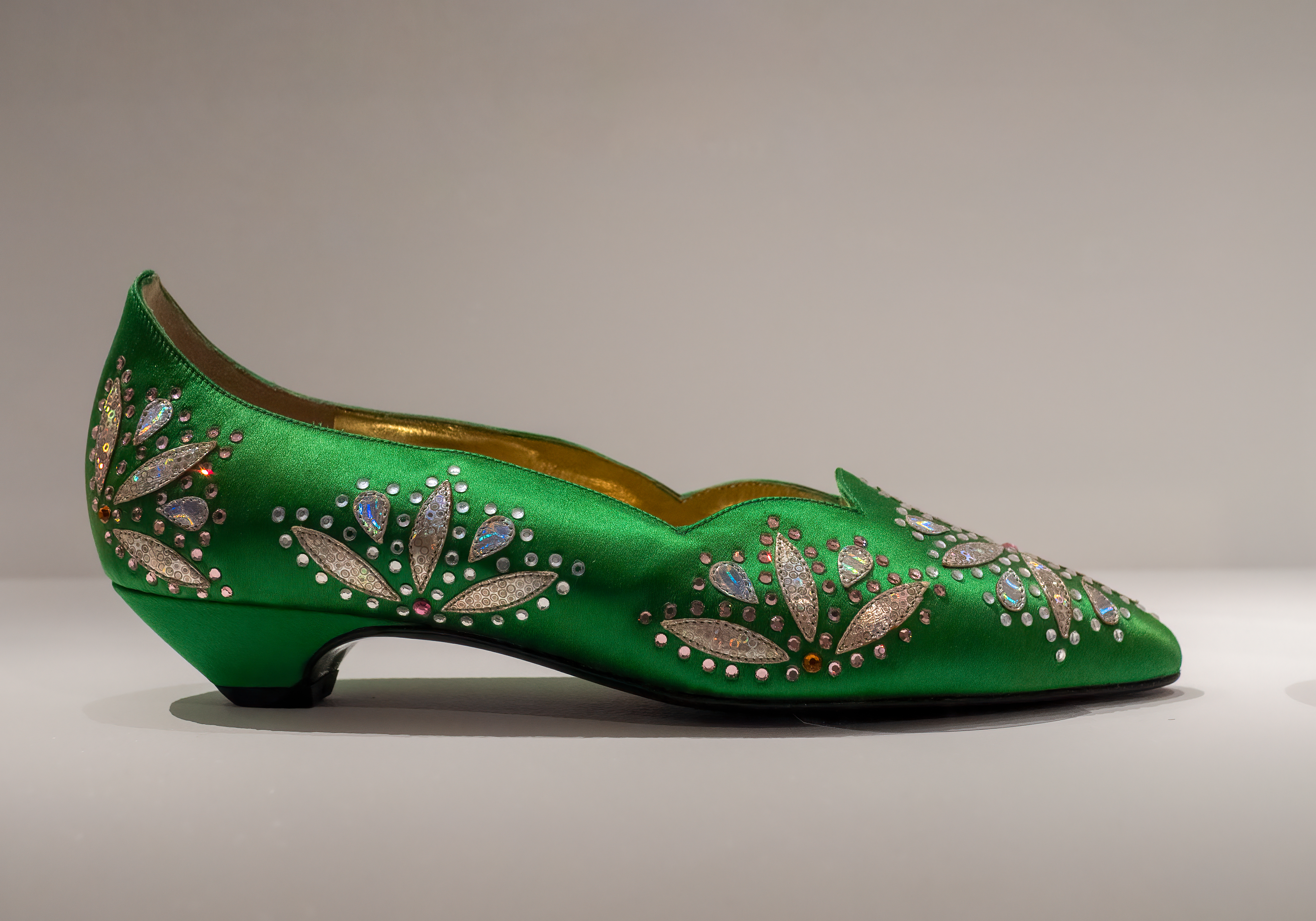
Shoe designed by Arpels at the Bata Shoe Museum

Shortly after the Second World War, Arpels opened a small boutique in midtown Manhattan, selling contemporary versions of embroidered Arabian kaftans, intended to be worn as "bohemian eveningwear". However, it was her "exquisitely made shoes" that would grow to be the mainstay of the business, and Arpels designed all her own shoes. Regular customers included Jacqueline Kennedy Onassis, and Arpels became her friend and fashion advisor for over 20 years. She made one shoe in each pair a quarter-inch higher to allow for the discrepancy in the lengths of Jackie's legs.

In 1960, she opened a high-end shoe store in the St. Regis New York, named Alliata after her Italian friend Princess Vittoria Alliata di Villafranca. In time, she moved to 665 Madison Avenue and then 470 Park Avenue, and in 1970, changed the name to Hélène Arpels. Her business partner in these ventures was Andre Azria, a Tunisian émigré living in New York, who in the 1950s had moved to the US, and managed the retail side. Arpels also owned a shoe factory near Bologna, Italy, which she ran with Azria, and visited twice a year.

Other customers included Betsy Bloomingdale, Leonore Annenberg, Nancy Reagan, Lily Auchincloss, and Bette Midler.

== Personal life ==
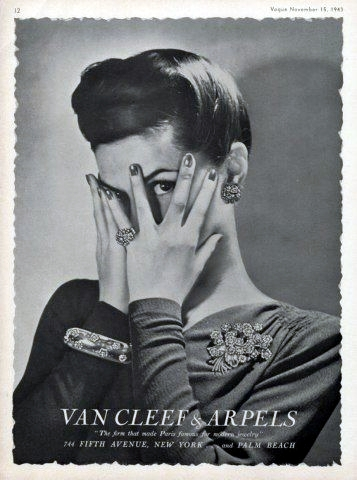
Van Cleef & Arpels advert, Vogue, 1943.

In 1933, she married the jeweler Louis Arpels. He would often seek her opinion on jewelry prototypes, and she was known for wearing jewelry in unusual ways, for example using diamond brooches on her shoes, and her catch phrase was "Diamonds go with everything". They would become estranged in later years, but continued to swap jewelry and style tips. After their divorce, Andre Azria became her life as well as business partner. Azria died in 2001.

She was a "Paris doyenne in her own right", and was on the annual "10 Best Dressed List" from 1949 to 1959.

== Legacy ==
Several pairs of Arpels' satin court pumps are in the permanent collection in the Metropolitan Museum of Art's Costume Institute, together with a pair of zip-front brogues that belonged to Lily Auchincloss.
