= Alessandro Dell'Acqua =

Italian fashion designer

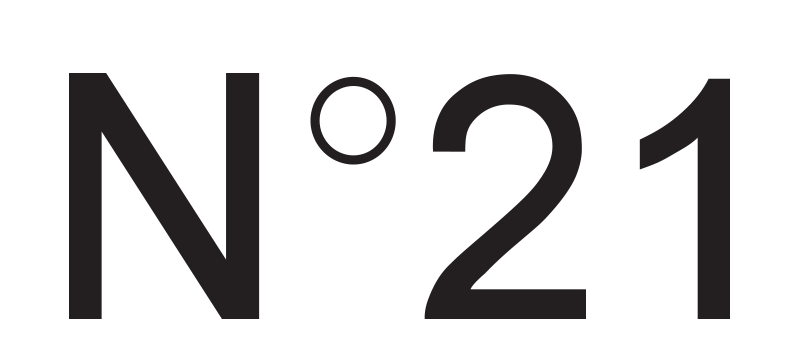
Logo of Alessandro Dell’Acqua’s label N°21

Alessandro Dell'Acqua (born 21 December 1962 in Naples) is an Italian fashion designer.

== Early life and education ==
At 13, Dell’Acqua became a part-time apprentice for a Neapolitan dressmaker. After graduating from the Accademia di Belle Arti in Naples, he moved to Milan.

== Career ==
=== Early beginnings ===
Dell’Acqua started his career in 1995 with a knitwear line called AA Milano, which later morphed into his signature line.

=== Alessandro Dell’Acqua, 1996–2009 ===
After working with Genny, Gilmar, Les Copains, Mariella Burani, Maska and Alma, Dell’Acqua launched an eponymous line in 1996, owned equally by the designer and Gianandrea Cataneo. The line was licensed to Bellemaille, owned by Cataneo. He presented his first prêt-à-porter collection at Milan Fashion Week in 1996 and his first men's line at Pitti in Florence in January 1998.

From around 2000, Dell’Acqua branched out into men’s wear, accessories, and fragrance; licenses included Euroitalia for the designer’s fragrance, Iris for footwear and Visibilia for eyewear.

For the brand's advertising campaigns, Dell’Acqua worked with various renowned photographers, including Juergen Teller (1998–1999), Miles Aldridge (2000) and Steven Klein (2001).

Besides his signature line, Dell’Acqua was appointed as creative director of Borbonese in 2000, on a three-year contract. In addition, he designed the La Perla ready-to-wear line — the brand’s first — from 2002 to 2008.

In 2003, the Arpels family bought 70 percent of Dell’Acqua’s business for an undisclosed sum.

In 2008, Dell’Acqua launched a high-end capsule collection called Alessandro Dell’Acqua Black Dress. Also in 2008, he took over as creative director at Malo, the Italian luxury knit company, and showed at Milan Fashion Week for the Spring 2009 season in September. For his first Malo collection, he used cashmere and flowing lines to create an informal but smart look.

After losing the use of his name and creative control of the brand, Dell’Acqua sent out a press release in June 2009 informing the press that the men's Spring-Summer 2010 and women's Pre-spring 2010 collections would be produced without his approval following creative disagreements with his production company, Cherry Grove. He subsequently parted ways with his eponymous label as well as with Malo.

=== Brioni, 2010–2011 ===
In 2010, Brioni – which had been without a single creative director for a few seasons – announced the appointment of Dell’Acqua as creative director of its women's line. By 2011, Brioni ended its womenswear line as well as its contract with Dell’Acqua.

=== N°21, 2010–present ===
Since 2010, Dell’Acqua has been operating his own label, N°21. The name comes from the designer's birthday, and it is also his lucky number. Since 2015, Italian fashion manufacturing company Gilmar has been owning 30 percent of N°21. The label was initially based in Milan’s Città Studi district before moving into its 16,000 sq ft (1,500 m^{2}) headquarters in the Porta Venezia district in 2022.

In addition to N°21, Dell'Acqua debuted his first collection for the knitwear brand Les Copains in 2012. From 2014 to 2020, he also served as creative director for women’s wear at Rochas. In 2018, he designed a capsule collection for Tod's.

By 2022, N°21 generated a third of its total turnover in Japan and opened its first freestanding store in Tokyo.

== Other activities ==
In 2020, Dell’Acqua and fashion brand agency Tomorrow London launched a mentorship program for emerging designers; each season two brands — one Italian and one international — will be selected by Dell’Acqua who will offer them a design and collection development consultancy service, while Tomorrow will advise them in terms of production development, marketing and distribution.
