= Julien Arpels =

French businessman (1884-1964)

- Born: 1884; Marseille, France
- Died: April 8, 1964 (age 79); New York City, U.S.
- Occupation: Businessman
- Known for: President of Van Cleef & Arpels
- Father: Leon Salomon Arpels
- Relatives: Louis Arpels (brother); Alfred Van Cleef (brother-in-law); Claude Arpels Jr. (grandson)

Julien Arpels (1884 – April 8, 1964) was a French businessman who was the heir to the luxury jeweler Van Cleef & Arpels. He served as president of the firm during the early 20th century and was responsible for its international expansion.

== Biography ==
Arpels was born in Marseille, France. He was the son of Leon Salomon Arpels, who founded Van Cleef & Arpels with his son-in-law, Alfred Van Cleef, who was a Dutch diamond-cutter.

After his father's death, Arpels joined his brother, Charles Arpels, and Van Cleef to open a boutique store at 22 Place Vendome, in Paris.

During the 1920s, American tourists urged the firm to open a New York City branch, and Julien was tasked with opening a store there. Its first New York location opened on, and closed soon after, October 24, 1929, the day of the Wall Street crash. Nonetheless, it reopened with much success after participating in the 1939 World's fair in New York, and the store moved from a small showroom in Rockefeller Center to its present location at 744 Fifth Avenue in the 1940s.

With the outbreak of World War II, Julien and his family were forced to leave Europe because of their Jewish lineage. Julien also sent his son, Claude, to Harvard University so that he would be better prepared to deal with the American clientele.

At the firm, Arpels was in charge of the business and managerial end of the firm, while his brother, Louis Arpels, was in charge of sales. His children, Claude, Jacques and Pierre joined the company's operations during the 1930s and took over its operations. Claude headed the jeweler's American operations, while Jacques Arpels became the chief executive.

In 1945, he received the Legion of Honour in Washington, D.C. from French Ambassador Henri Bonnet.

On April 8, 1964, Arpels died in his apartment at the Hampshire House. He was 79 years old.
