= Trump Parc =

Adjoining buildings in Manhattan, New York

Coordinates: 40.76565°N 73.97684°W

Trump Parc and Trump Parc East are two adjoining buildings at the southwest corner of Central Park South and Sixth Avenue in Midtown Manhattan, New York City. Trump Parc (the former Barbizon-Plaza Hotel) is a 38-story condominium building, and Trump Parc East is a 14-story apartment and condominium building.

== Trump Parc: Barbizon-Plaza Hotel ==
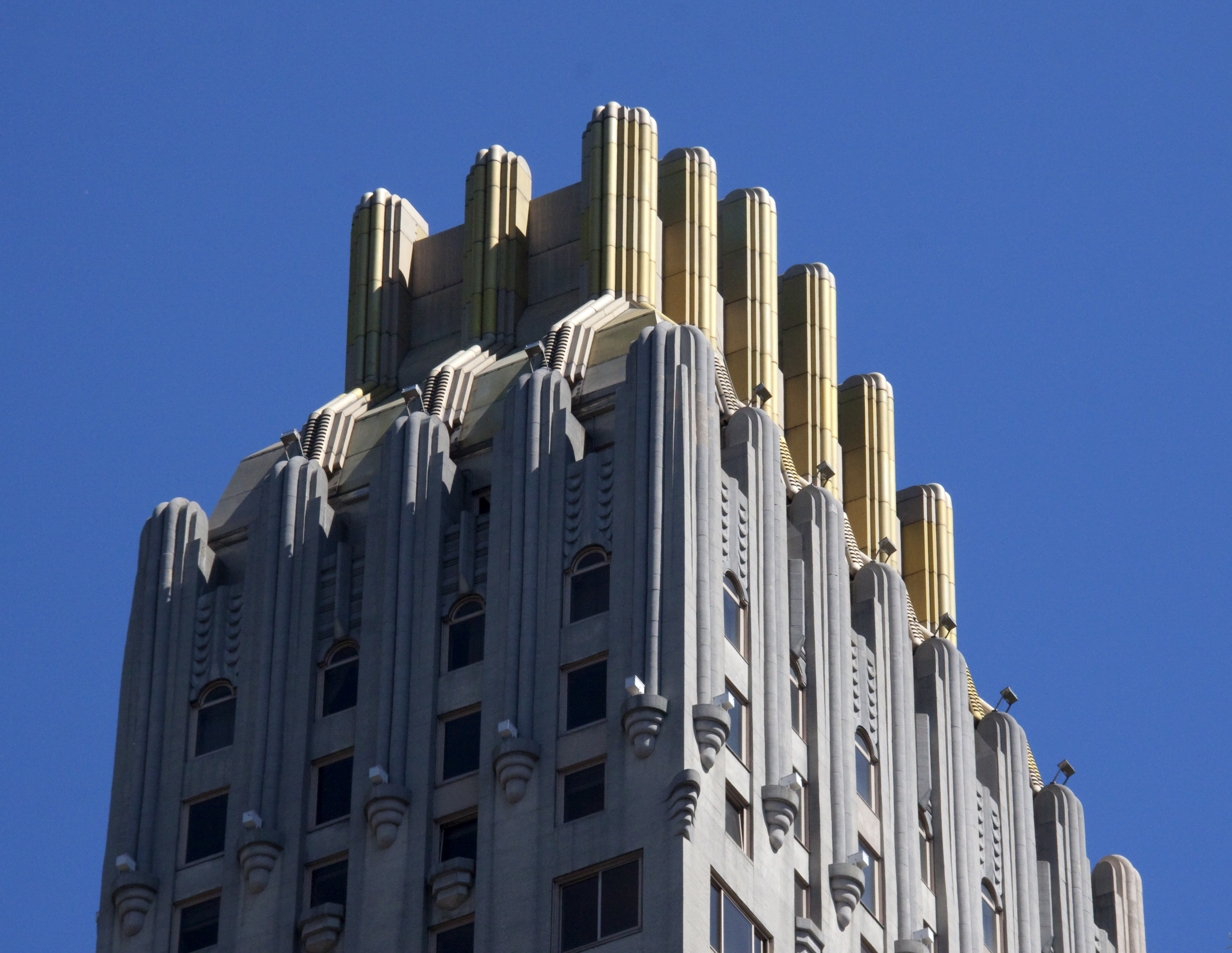
Trump Parc (highlighting roof detail)

The 38-story art deco Barbizon-Plaza Hotel opened at 106 Central Park South on May 12, 1930 with 1,400 ensuite rooms. It was built for $10 million by William H. Silk. The architect was Laurence Emmons. The hotel was designed to appeal to artists and musicians, with facilities including soundproof practice rooms, art studios, and two performance halls. It was built as a co-ed companion to the Barbizon Hotel for Women on East 63rd Street. The property was foreclosed on in 1933.

At some point, likely around World War II, the top of the building was altered to its present form with a stylish design. Carter B. Horsley of The City Review said, "Its only rivals in audacity are the Chrysler Building and the former RCA/GE tower".

Aeolian Company installed a large pipe organ at the hotel in 1930; it was moved a year later to the nearby American Women's Association clubhouse.

During World War II, two floors of the hotel were reserved for the use of Royal Navy officers based in or passing through New York City. At this time there was a drug-store on the ground floor of the hotel. New York society ladies served tea to the British officers every afternoon.

From the late 1950s through the mid-1960s, the Barbizon-Plaza Hotel hosted multiple events by homophile movement organizations. These included the Mattachine Society's fifth convention on August 30, 1958; the third Daughters of Bilitis convention on June 20, 1964; and the East Coast Homophile Organizations (ECHO) conference on September 25–26, 1965.

Lambert Brussels Real Estate Corp. and Loeb Rhoades purchased the hotel in 1973 for $11 million, and affiliated it with the Penta Hotels chain. Despite the completion of $2 million of renovations, the hotel earned minimal profits for its new owners.

Donald Trump purchased the hotel and the neighboring apartment building in 1981. On December 14, 1985, he closed the hotel to prepare for conversion to condominiums. He renamed the property as "Trump Parc" and completed the conversion with 340 condominium units around 1988.

== Trump Parc East: 100 Central Park South ==
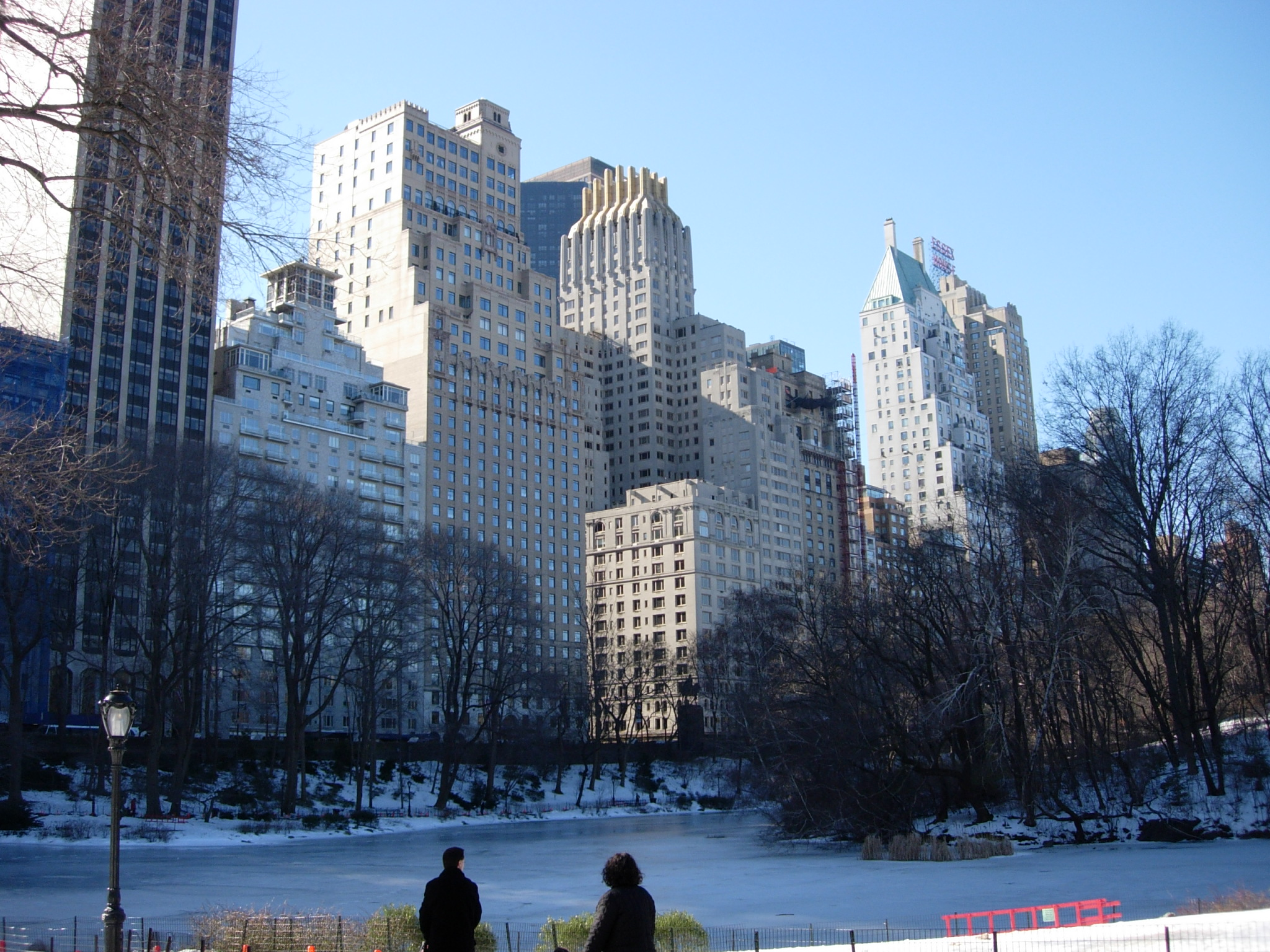
Trump Parc East (small building in the foreground) with Trump Parc behind

100 Central Park South is a 14-story building that was built as an apartment complex around 1917 by John J. Hearn.

Trump purchased the Barbizon Plaza Hotel and 100 Central Park South from Banque Lambert in 1981 for $65 million, financed by a $50 million loan from Chase Manhattan Bank. As to the apartment building, Trump stated that "they practically gave it to me, because it was losing so much money under rent control." He also claimed to have paid only $13 million for the two buildings. By 1985, 60 of the building's 80 units were occupied, with about half being rent-controlled and the rest being rent-stabilized. Trump's intention was to replace the two buildings with a new one, which would be "one of the finest pieces of real estate in New York."

In a February 1985 New York article, Tony Schwartz detailed "how a bunch of rent-controlled and rent-stabilized tenants in an old building... have managed to do what city agencies, courts, colleagues, competitors, and the National Football League have never been able to do: successfully stand in the way of something Donald Trump wants." Trump could have bought out the rent-controlled tenants; instead, he contracted with Citadel Management, who also handled tenant resettlement and had been accused of harassment in the past. The article goes on to describe how Trump and his organization, attempting to evict the tenants, harassed them through "lapses in building security" and ignored needed repairs.

Trump (as Park South Associates) sued to evict the tenants in 1981, and in 1982 the management company ordered six tenants to comply with rules ignored for 30 years, giving them 10 days to comply. Trump, in newspaper advertisements, also offered to house homeless in the vacated units, which was seen as a threat to the remaining tenants. The tenants raised funds and hired legal counsel, receiving an injunction against the compliance orders in 1984. In 1985 the harassment case was brought to the state's Division of Housing and Community Renewal, with the city mentioning daily harassment, "wrongful acts and omissions", bogus nonpayment notices, and utilities that were turned off, by Trump's agents. The city lost an injunction against Trump in September 1985, with the State Supreme Court justice stating that "The danger of irreparable harm to the tenants seems to be minimal now that the challenged activities of the defendants are under the scrutiny of the various departments of the City of New York." The hearings were still open in November 1985, even though Trump had claimed victory.

Trump countersued, citing the RICO act, listing charges including extortion and bribery that were committed by the tenants. Judge Whitman Knapp rejected the countersuit, ordering it dismissed with prejudice. In a 1985 editorial in The New York Times, Sydney Schanberg called Trump a "slumlord". Trump's attorney on the case responded in an editorial, attacking Schanberg, the tenants' lawyer, the city, and calling it a "political maneuver in a mayoral election year".

Ultimately, in 1986, Trump dropped the eviction suit, allowing the tenants to stay with their rent controls in place and paying their legal fees of over $500,000. Trump stated he would not continue with demolition but would renovate the building to "take advantage of the strong real-estate market now."

After a final settlement in 1988, the building was converted to a condominium with 51 rent-regulated tenants remaining. In 2016 some rent-controlled tenants were paying less than $1000 for a one-bedroom apartment along Central Park.

Notable tenants have included Suzanne Blackmer, who lived in the building from before Trump's purchase until her death in 2004, Arnold Scaasi, Eric Trump, Tony Bennett, and Brenda Vaccaro.
