= 59th Street (Manhattan) =

West-east street in Manhattan, New York

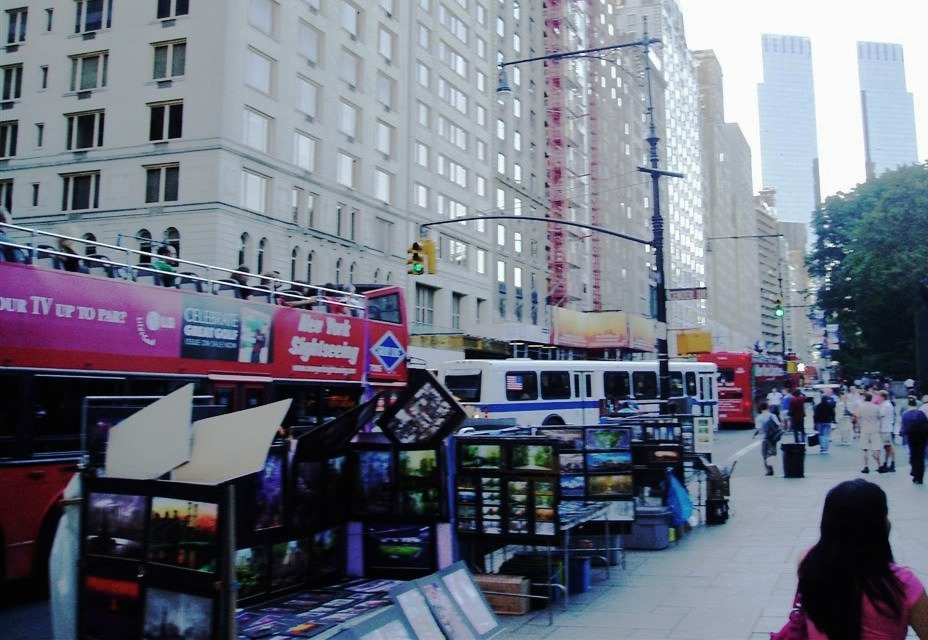
- Looking west along Central Park South
- Interactive map of 59th Street
- Coordinates: 40.7642908724°N 73.9730390°W
- West end: NY 9A / West Side Highway
- Major junctions: Grand Army Plaza, Columbus Circle
- East end: Sutton Place

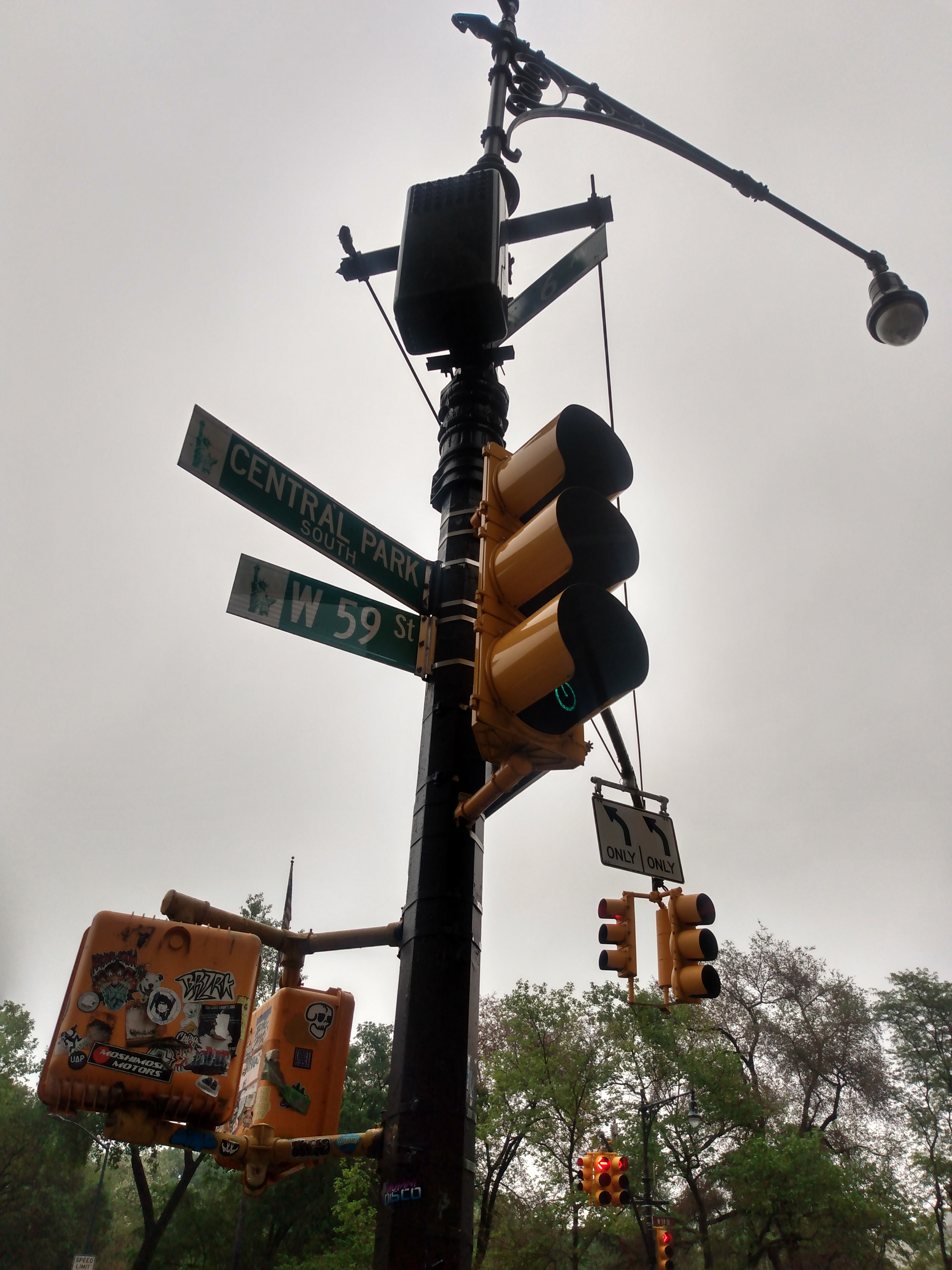
Signs showing both Central Park South and West 59th Street at 6th Avenue

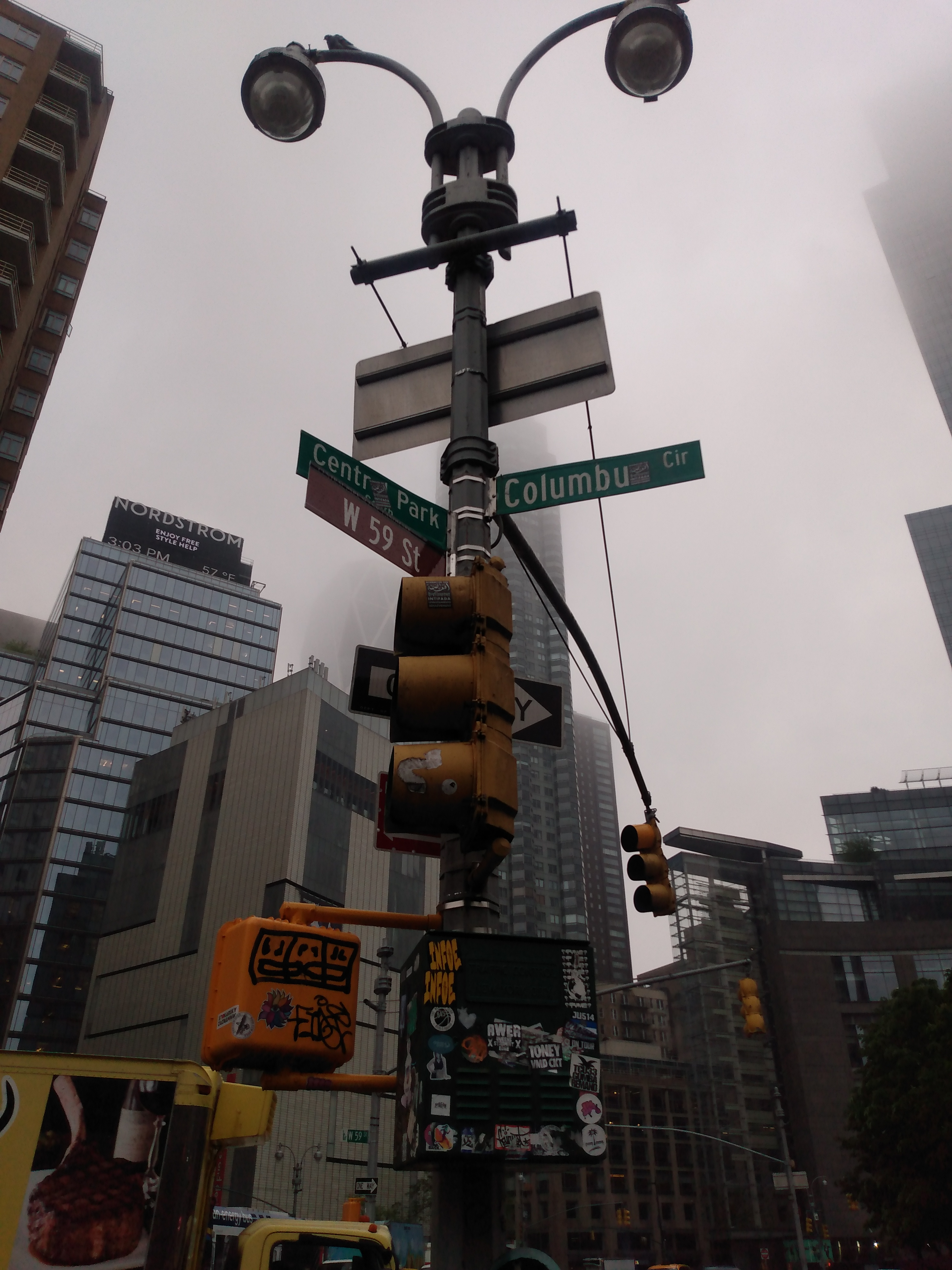
Signs showing both Central Park South and West 59th Street at Columbus Circle

59th Street is a crosstown street in the New York City borough of Manhattan, running from York Avenue and Sutton Place on the East Side of Manhattan to the West Side Highway on the West Side. The three-block portion between Columbus Circle and Grand Army Plaza is also known as Central Park South, since it forms the southern border of Central Park. There is a gap in the street between Ninth Avenue/Columbus Avenue and Columbus Circle, where the Deutsche Bank Center is located. While the Central Park South section is a bidirectional street, most of 59th Street carries one-way traffic.

59th Street forms the border between Midtown Manhattan and Upper Manhattan. North of 59th Street, the neighborhoods of the Upper West Side and Upper East Side continue on either side of Central Park. On the West Side, Manhattan's numbered avenues are renamed north of 59th Street: Eighth Avenue (at Columbus Circle) becomes Central Park West; Ninth Avenue is renamed Columbus Avenue; Tenth Avenue is renamed Amsterdam Avenue; and Eleventh Avenue becomes West End Avenue.

== Route description ==
59th Street forms the border between Midtown Manhattan and Upper Manhattan. The New York Times stated in 2004 that "Fifty-ninth Street stretches across Manhattan like a belt, with Central Park South as its fancy buckle." As with numbered streets in Manhattan, Fifth Avenue separates 59th Street into "east" and "west" sections.

59th Street is one-way westbound between the West Side Highway (at the Hudson River) and Ninth/Columbus Avenues. There is a one-block gap between Ninth/Columbus Avenues and Eighth Avenue/Central Park West at Columbus Circle. This section is occupied by Deutsche Bank Center.

The portion of the street forming the southern boundary of Central Park from Columbus Circle on the west to Fifth Avenue on the east is also known as Central Park South. This section of 59th Street is largely bidirectional, except for the short block between Grand Army Plaza and Fifth Avenue, which is one-way eastbound. The block between Sixth Avenue and Grand Army Plaza contains a dedicated lane for westbound equestrian traffic. Entry into Central Park can be made at the Scholars' Gate at Fifth Avenue, the Artists' Gate at Sixth Avenue, the Artisans' Gate at Seventh Avenue, and the Merchants' Gate at Columbus Circle.

The section between Fifth Avenue and Second Avenue is one-way eastbound. At Second Avenue, 59th Street branches off onto the Ed Koch Queensboro Bridge, which is often referred to as the 59th Street Bridge. 59th Street continues east to York Avenue and Sutton Place, just short of the East River. The remaining two and a half blocks are bidirectional traffic; the westbound lane of 59th Street is funneled onto the Queensboro Bridge just east of the intersection with Second Avenue.

== History ==
59th Street was created under the Commissioners' Plan of 1811 as one of the minor east-west streets across Manhattan.

The construction of Central Park in the 1860s and 1870s led to the development of upscale hotels, apartments, and other institutions on this section of 59th Street in the late 19th and early 20th centuries. The Spanish Flats, at Seventh Avenue, was the first such luxury apartment, having been built in 1883. The original Plaza Hotel, the Hawthorne, and the Navarro Flats were all developed in the 1880s and 1890s, though all were subsequently demolished. Even after a city zoning law was passed in 1885, banning residential structures over 80 feet (24 m) tall, residential hotels and standard hotels continued to be developed on this part of West 59th Street, as they were exempted from the zoning codes. The three blocks of 59th Street bordering Central Park were renamed after the park in 1896.

During the first two decades of the 20th century, the new Plaza Hotel, the old New York Athletic Club building, and Gainsborough Studios were built on Central Park South. This was followed by 100 Central Park South, a new New York Athletic Club building, Barbizon Plaza, Hampshire House, Essex House, Hotel St. Moritz, and 240 Central Park South between World Wars I and II. After World War II, an increasing number of stores opened on the south side of Central Park South, even though the corridor was restricted to residential usage. This prompted the New York City Planning Commission to consider rezoning that part of the street in early 1950. Following opposition from existing residents, the commission rejected the rezoning.

Historically, West 59th Street ran from Ninth/Columbus Avenues to Columbus Circle as well. In 1954, that city block of 59th Street was decommissioned to make way for the New York Coliseum complex. The Coliseum, in turn, was demolished and replaced with Time Warner Center in the early 2000s.

== Transportation ==
59th Street is served by the following New York City Subway stations:

- 59th Street–Columbus Circle (1, A, B, C, and D trains)
- Fifth Avenue–59th Street (N, R, and W trains)
- Lexington Avenue/59th Street (4, 5, 6, <6>, N, R, and W trains)

The Roosevelt Island Tramway terminates at Second Avenue near 59th Street and extends eastward to Roosevelt Island.

The New York Central Railroad's 59th Street station, a never-opened railroad station, exists on Park Avenue, which now carries the Park Avenue main line of the Metro-North Railroad. Currently, the station is used as an emergency exit for the Metro-North Railroad in the Park Avenue Tunnel.

== Notable buildings ==
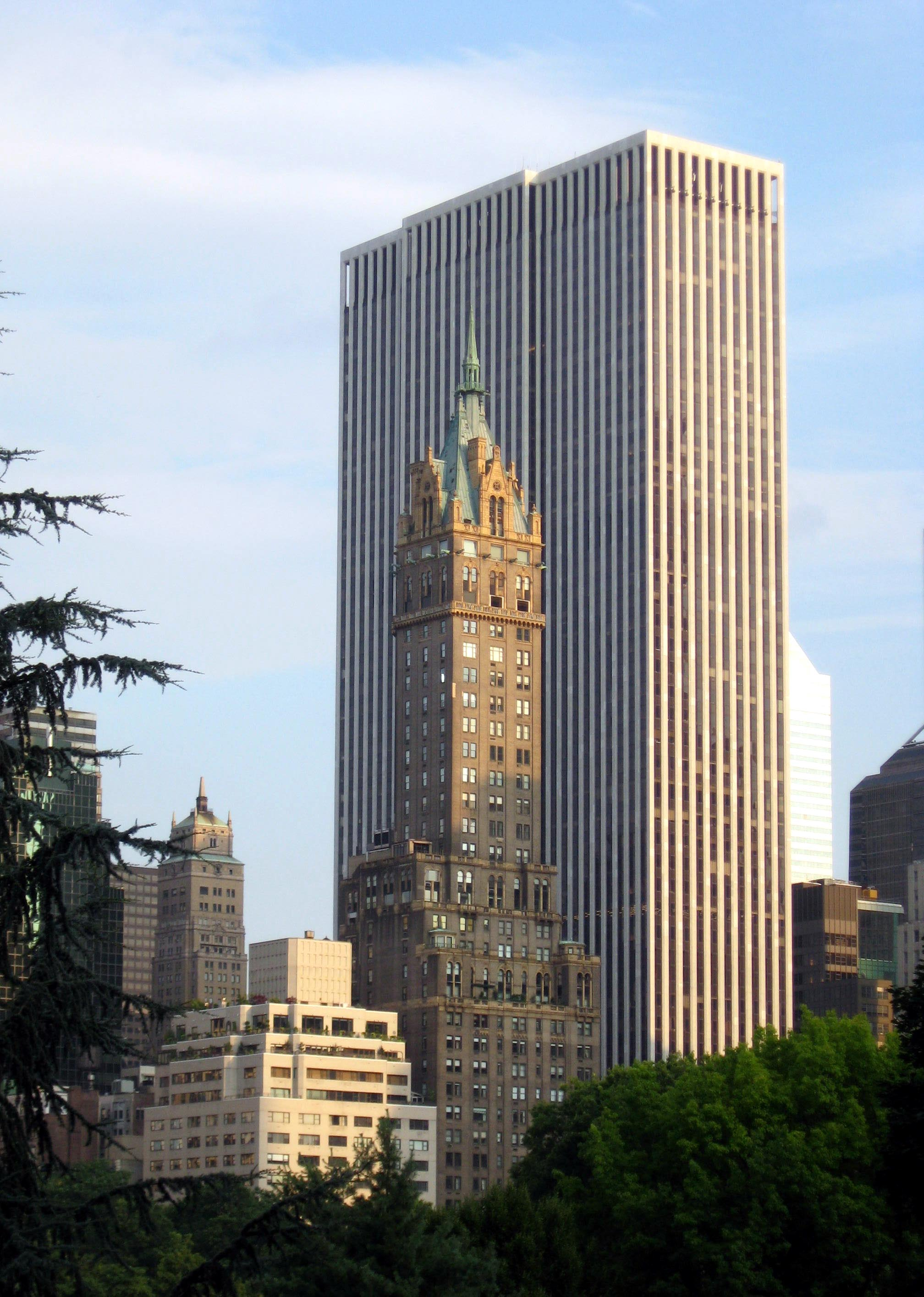
The Sherry-Netherland and GM Building face each other across 59th Street

- Bloomingdale's Department Store between Third and Lexington Avenues
- Bloomberg World Headquarters between Third and Lexington Avenues
- Trump Park Avenue, at Park Avenue
- 500 Park Avenue, at Park Avenue
- 59E59 Theaters, an Off-Broadway theater complex between Park and Madison Avenues
- General Motors Building, southeast corner of Fifth Avenue
- Formerly: Savoy-Plaza Hotel, southeast corner of Fifth Avenue
- The Sherry-Netherland, northeast corner of Fifth Avenue
- Formerly: Hotel New Netherland, northeast corner of Fifth Avenue
- Plaza Hotel, southwest corner of Grand Army Plaza
- Park Lane Hotel, 16 Central Park South
- Ritz-Carlton, southeast corner of Sixth Avenue, flagship of the Ritz-Carlton chain
- Trump Parc, southwest corner of Sixth Avenue
- Hampshire House, 150 Central Park South
- JW Marriott Essex House, 160 Central Park South
- New York Athletic Club, southeast corner of Seventh Avenue
- 200 Central Park South, southwest corner of Seventh Avenue
- 220 Central Park South
- Gainsborough Studios at 222 Central Park South
- 240 Central Park South, southeast corner of Columbus Circle
- 2 Columbus Circle, south corner of Columbus Circle
- Trump International Hotel and Tower, north corner of Columbus Circle
- Time Warner Center, west side of Columbus Circle
- Mount Sinai West at 10th Avenue
- Haaren Hall
- Anya and Andrew Shiva Art Gallery, 524 West 59th Street
- IRT Powerhouse fills the entire block between 58th to 59th Street, and from 11th to 12th Avenues.
- Hudson River Park extends along the Hudson River from Battery Park to 59th Street.
