= Malo (company) =

- Company type: Privately held company
- Industry: Fashion, Luxury
- Founded: 1972; 54 years ago Florence, Italy
- Headquarters: Campi Bisenzio, Italy
- Key people: Alfredo Canessa, Giacomo Canessa
- Products: Clothing, Accessories and Footwear
- Website: www.malo.it

Malo (from Latin ego mālō /ˈmaː.loː/, meaning I prefer) is an Italian luxury brand of cashmere, started in Florence in 1972 by brothers Alfredo and Giacomo Canessa.

Malo products are produced in Italy. Its collections are seasonal and are distributed through a direct sales network that includes Malo stores, multi-brand stores and selected department stores in different parts of the world.

== History ==
Malo Tricot Srl was started by brothers Giacomo and Alfredo Canessa in 1972 in Florence. The company relocated in 1973 to Campi Bisenzio in the province of Florence in Tuscany, where cashmere production commenced. During the 70s and 80s the company became nationally known.

In 1980, Malo Tricot became Malo Spa and the company expanded beyond its initial regional boundaries to open a showroom in Milan. In 1984 Malo USA Inc. was opened in New York City to distribute knitwear products in the United States. In 1988, Malo Spa acquired the knitting mill Velley Spa of Alessandria and Abor Srl of Piacenza as part of a campaign of further expansion.

In 1989 Malo Spa changed its name to Mac (Manufacturing Associate Cashmere). From the 90s onwards, the company's strategy focused on increasing exports, through the opening of sales offices in strategic markets (New York, Düsseldorf, Paris, Tokyo) and the growth of flagship stores to promote the brand.

In 1994, Mac announced the acquisition of national competitor MGM Malima. In 1999 Malo joined the Itierre group from Molise (IT Holding Group), of which it remained a part until its split after the crash of IT Holding. In October 2010 Malo was acquired by Evanthe (part of the Italian group Exa S.r.l.).

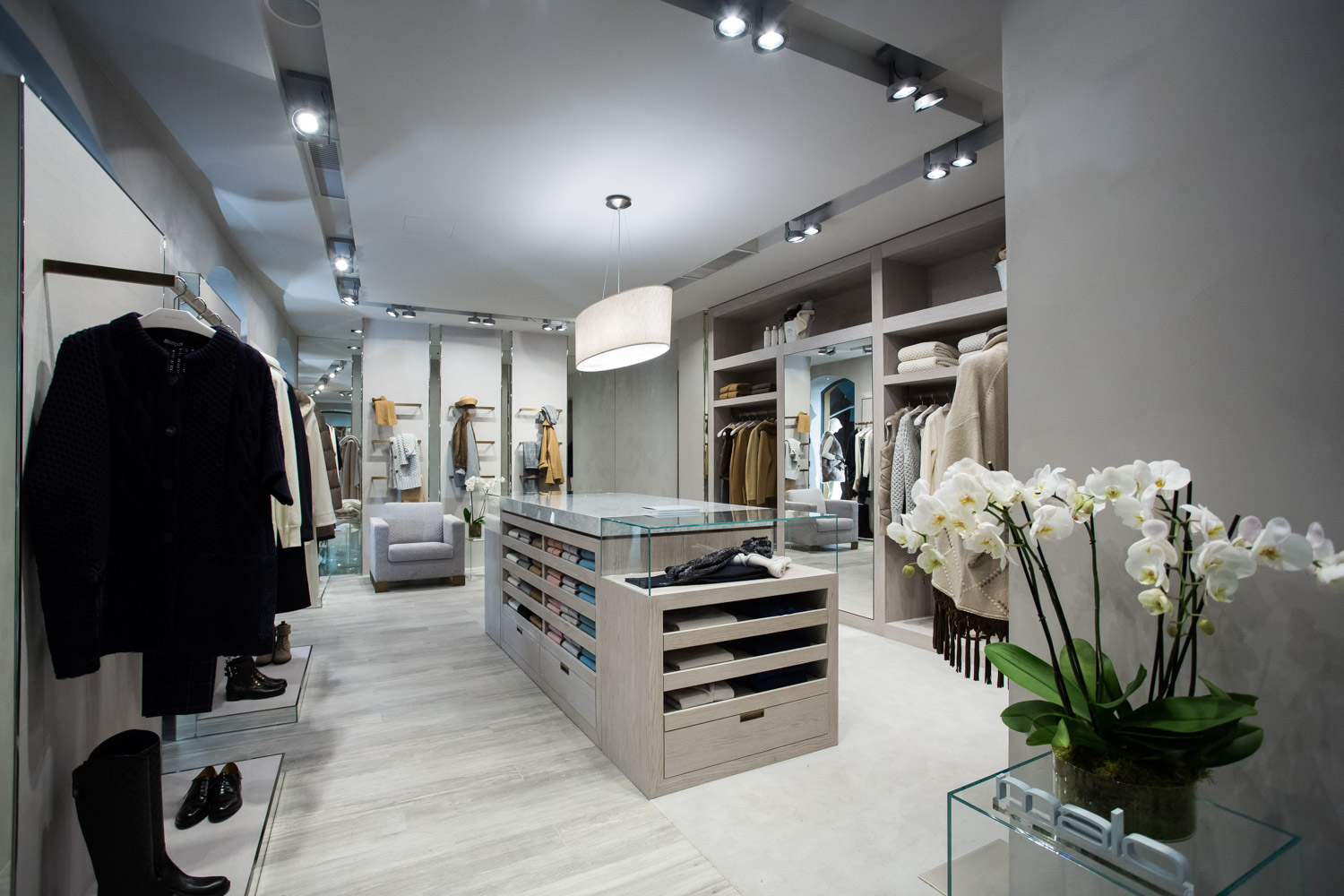
Malo boutique in Saint Tropez, France

In 1994 Malo announced that they had acquired the whole of their competitor MGM Malima from Armando Poggio, making the Associate Cashmere Manufacturing Group a national leader in cashmere production.

In 2001 Malo opened flagships in Courmayeur and Marbella. In 2002 - a new boutique in Beverly hills.

Malo made its fashion debut at the 2006 New York Fashion Week with an autumn-winter collection designed by Fabio Piras and collections by fashion designers Roberto Rimondi, Alessandro Dell'Acqua, Hamish Morrow, Xavier Palatella and William Capone.

In 2014 Malo was acquired by a private investment fund.

In 2015 Giacomo Canessa returned to the brand. During summer 2015 Malo opened three new flagships — one in Saint Tropez and two in Moscow.

== Production ==
The Malo cashmere production technique originates in Mongolia. The fleece is made into cashmere after spinning and dyeing in Italian workshops. The final weaving is performed with traditional hand-made frames and modern machinery. The company manufactures cashmere knitwear in its processing facilities in Florence and Piacenza. Malo also has product lines in leather goods, footwear and houseware.

== Locations ==
Malo headquarters is located in Campi Bisenzio, near Florence. Prêt-à-porter presentations are held at the showroom in Milan. Malo boutiques are present in Italy, France, Spain, the United States, Russia, Japan and South Korea.

== See also ==
- Italian fashion
- Made in Italy
