= René Sim Lacaze =

French jewelry designer (1901–2000)

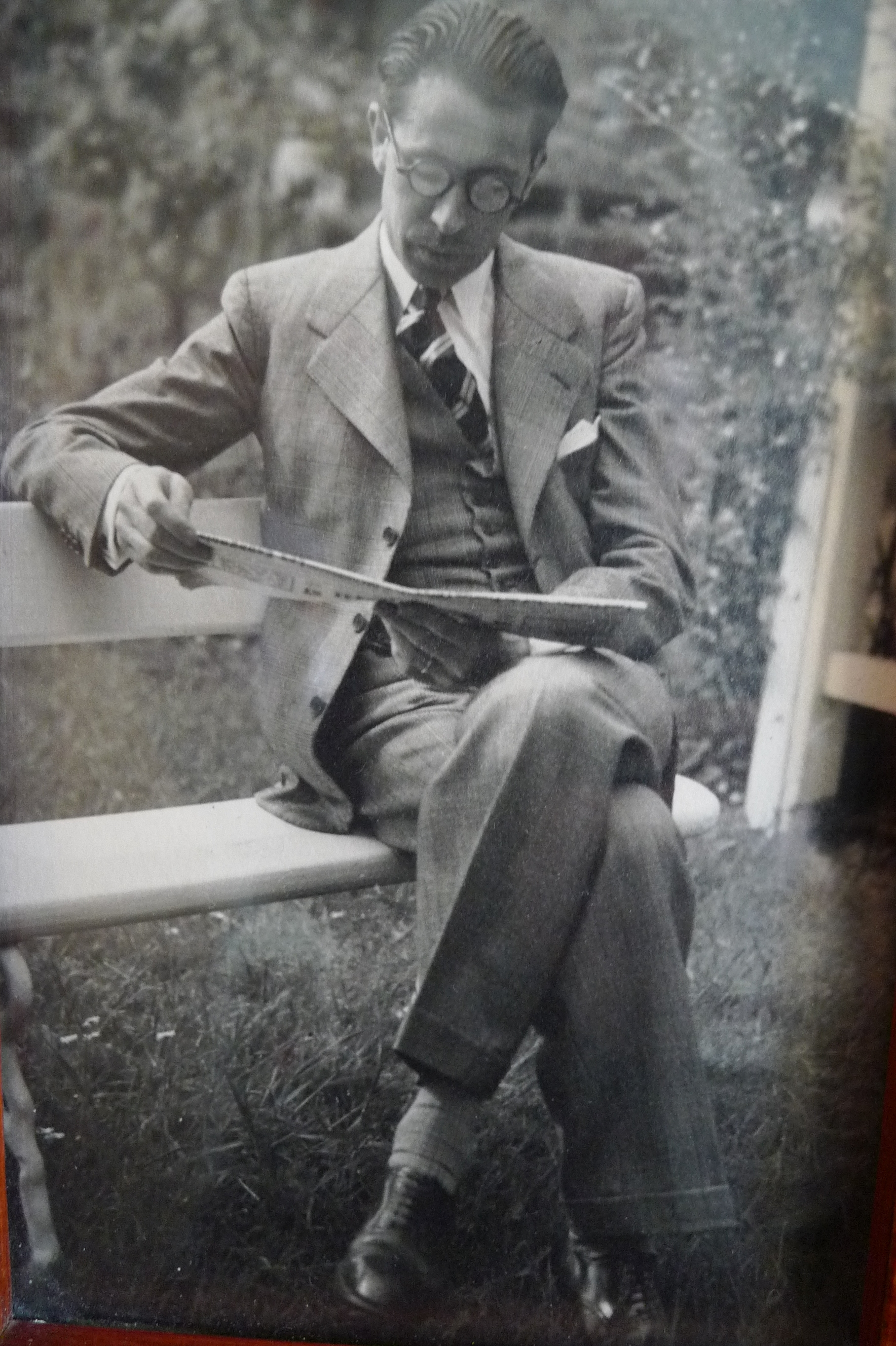
Lacaze, c. 1941

René Sim Lacaze (27 July 1901 – 5 January 2000) was a French jewellery designer and artist. He played a major role in the development of the style known as European Art Deco.

== Life and work ==
René Lacaze was born in Paris on 27 July 1901. His mother ran a tailoring and dressmaking business in Rue d’Alger, where Lacaze grew to love fashion from his early childhood. His uncle, Armand Bignon, often took the young Lacaze to visit museums, where he discovered a passion for art.

A friend of Lacaze was a jeweller and regaled Lacaze with accounts of his work, describing how he created pieces of jewellery set with precious stones including diamonds. Lacaze felt drawn to the profession. He began a four-year training course at Atelier Mentel in Paris, a studio which worked with the most famous jewellers of the time: Cartier, Boucheron, Ancoc and Janésich.

He interrupted this training in 1921 to complete his military service. After spending 26 months in the French Air Force near Bourges, where he was deployed as a cartographer, he returned to Paris and introduced himself to the great jewellers in the Rue de la Paix and Place Vendôme.

In 1923, Lacaze began to work for Van Cleef & Arpels, where it was not long before his exceptional talent for drawing was spotted. Together with Alfred van Cleef's daughter, Renée Rachel Puissant, he took over as head of artistic and creative design at Van Cleef & Arpels in 1926. This period saw the creation of famous pieces of jewellery such as the Minaudière and the introduction of the 'serti invisible' technique which enabled gemstones to be held in place without visible prongs or claws.

In June 1928, Lacaze married his wife Simone; the couple went on to have four children. As he explains in his unpublished biography, in that year Lacaze added the first syllable of his wife's name to his own and henceforth was known as René Sim Lacaze.

Lacaze ceased to work for Van Cleef & Arpels in 1941, moving to Mauboussin and also running his own jewellery studio. He created pieces for illustrious clients including Marlene Dietrich, Michèle Morgan, Maurice Chevalier and the Duchess of Windsor.

Upon his retirement in 1968, Lacaze devoted himself to painting and produced numerous water-colours. He died at the age of 99 in Maisons-Laffitte on 5 January 2000.

Today, the name of René Sim Lacaze stands for the luxury online jewellery store RenéSim, founded in 2010 by Lacaze's grandson Maximilian Hemmerle and Hemmerle's business partner Georg Schmidt-Sailer.
