= Louis Arpels =

Dutch-French jeweler

- Born: 1886; Marseille, France
- Died: 20 March 1976 (aged 89–90); Paris, France
- Occupations: Businessman, jeweller
- Known for: heir to the Van Cleef & Arpels fortune
- Father: Leon Salomon Arpels
- Relatives: Julien Arpels (brother); Alfred Van Cleef (brother-in-law); Claude Arpels Jr. (grandnephew)

Louis Arpels (1886 – 20 March 1976) was a Dutch-French jeweler.

In 1906, Alfred Van Cleef (1873–1938) established Van Cleef & Arpels, a jewellery business in Paris, with his two brothers-in-law, Charles Arpels (1880–1951) and Julien Arpels (1884–1964). In 1913, Louis joined his brothers.

In 1933, he married Hélène Ostrowska, who was a fashion model for the House of Worth. From the late 1940s onwards, she was a shoe designer and boutique owner.

In August 1940, Louis and Hélène sailed on one of the last liners bound for the United States until the end of the war. In New York City, they established the American branch of the business.

Arpels died at his home near Paris on 20 March 1976, aged 89.
