= SS Cheribon =

Transatlantic ocean liner (1882–1902)

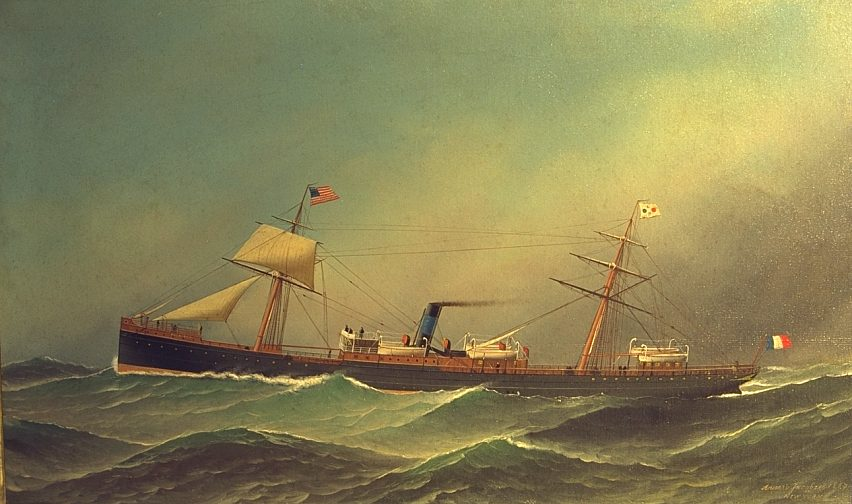
- Oil painting of the SS Cheribon (1887) by Antonio Jacobsen.

History

France
- Name: Cheribon (1882–1899)
- Owner: Compagnie Nationale de Navigation (1882–1899)
- Builder: William Denny & Brothers
- Yard number: 261
- Launched: July 15, 1882
- Home port: Marseille, France
- Fate: Sold

History

Chile
- Name: Cheribon (1899–1901)
- Owner: Captain W. T. Pitt (1899–1901)
- Home port: Valparaíso, Chile
- Fate: Sold

History

Chile
- Name: Cheribon (1901–1902)
- Owner: E. Gerrard (1901–1902)
- Home port: Valparaiso, Chile
- Fate: Wrecked (April 11, 1902)

General characteristics
- Class & type: Steamship, ocean liner
- Tonnage: 3,075 GRT
- Length: 341.2 feet (104m)
- Propulsion: Steam, single screw
- Speed: 11 knots

SS Cheribon (1882–1902) was a transatlantic ocean liner steamship built for Compagnie Nationale de Navigation by William Denny & Brothers in Dumbarton, Scotland. Compagnie Nationale de Navigation initially employed the ship as a military troop transporter to French Indochina. Subsequently, the Cheribon was commissioned as a passenger ship for Italian immigrants, offering a New York route, as well as a South American route. She also was used at various times in her career as a cargo ship. The Cheribon was retired in 1899 and sold to Captain W. T. Pitt. In 1901, Pitt sold majority share of her to E. Gerrad, while retaining one-third ownership and command of the ship. On April 11, 1902, while carrying a shipment of coffee, the Cheribon wrecked on a reef off of Punta Remedios near Acajutla, El Salvador. All crew were eventually saved, however, the ship eventually sank.

== History ==
=== Compagnie Nationale de Navigation service ===
The Cheribon was ordered built by the Compagnie Nationale de Navigation. The company was founded in 1879 at Marseille, and given a 25 year charter, with the French government, to operate. The company voluntarily liquidated in 1904 after the French government did not renew the charter. Compagnie Nationale de Navigation was created by Marc Fraissinet with the original purpose of establishing regular troop transport to Tonkin, which at the time was a French protectorate. The Compagnie Nationale de Navigation Tonkin service was also an important supply line for France during the Sino-French War (1884-1885). The Cheribon was launched in 1882 and immediately began service on the Marseille-French Indochina line, transporting French soldiers before and during the war. By the end of the Sino-French War, the Compagnie Nationale de Navigation had procured eight steamers, along the Marseille-French Indochina route, all between 2,900 and 3,700 in tonnage. With the war over, and France the victor, the company found itself with access tonnage and began diversifying its routes.

In 1886, the Cheribon inaugurated the new Marseille, Naples, Algiers, New York City route. After the first transatlantic trip, Compagnie Nationale de Navigation permanently discontinued the Algiers service. From its inception, the New York service was part of the Italian diaspora. The route predominantly serviced impoverished Southern Italians from former areas of the Kingdom of Two Sicilies, such as Calabria, Campania, Molise, Apulia, Abruzzo, and Basilicata. During these years, the Cheribon would transport Italian immigrants from Naples to New York and would return from the United States to Marseille with shipments of pig lead. The Cheribon would service the New York route, at irregular intervals, until 1896. In total, she made twelve voyages along the New York service.

Compagnie Nationale de Navigation also pressed the Cheribon into service of the South American line. On September 26, 1887, the Cheribon was the first ship to be dispatched on the new Marseille, Rio de Janeiro, Montevideo, and Buenos Aires route. The Cheribon serviced the route for three years, bringing Italian immigrants to South America. However, Compagnie Nationale de Navigation permanently discontinued the South America service in 1891, due to the financial crisis in Argentina that effectively halted immigration to the country.

With the termination of the New York service in 1896 and the South America service in 1891, the Cheribon returned to exclusive use of the French Indochina line, servicing Marseille, Saigon, and Haiphong until 1899. Although, Compagnie Nationale de Navigation serviced the French Indochina line until 1904, the Cheribon was sold in 1899 as part of the liquidation, as the company made plans for dissolution with the approaching end of its government charter.

=== Sinking ===
Captain W. T. Pitt bought the Cheribon and relocated to its new home port of Valparaiso, Chile. She was sold again in 1901 to E. Gerrad, however, Pitt remained captain of the Cheribon and the home port remained the same. During these final years, she transported various cargo in South and Central America. On the morning of April 12, 1902, Captain W. T. Pitt was commanding the ship in the midst of thick weather, near Acajutla, El Salvador. Captain Pitt was making his first trip along the El Salvadorian coast when the ship crashed on a reef close to Acajutla, El Salvador. The ship wrecked and fragmented into pieces but remained buoyant throughout the day. On the evening of April 12, 1902, the SS San Jose came to the rescue of the Cheribon and all crew members were safely brought to a port in Panama. At the time of the crash, the Cheribon carried a cargo of 2,600 bags of coffee. While the ship was never recovered, much of the cargo was eventually saved. The exact location of the Cheribon shipwreck is documented as latitude 13°35'30.1"N and longitude 89°50'23.3"W.

== See also ==
- Italian diaspora
- List of ocean liners
- List of ships built by William Denny and Brothers
- Sino-French War

== Bibliography ==
- Bonsor, N. R. P. (1975). North Atlantic seaway : an illustrated history of the passenger services linking the Old World with the New in four volumes. Vol. 3. New York: Arco Publishing Co. ISBN 978-0-668-03679-5. OCLC 1194912223.
- Bonsor, N. R. P. (1983). South Atlantic seaway : an illustrated history of the passenger lines and liners from Europe to Brazil, Uruguay, and Argentina. Jersey Channel Islands: Brookside Publications. ISBN 0-905824-06-7. OCLC 12749431.
