= 200 Central Park South =

Building in Manhattan, New York

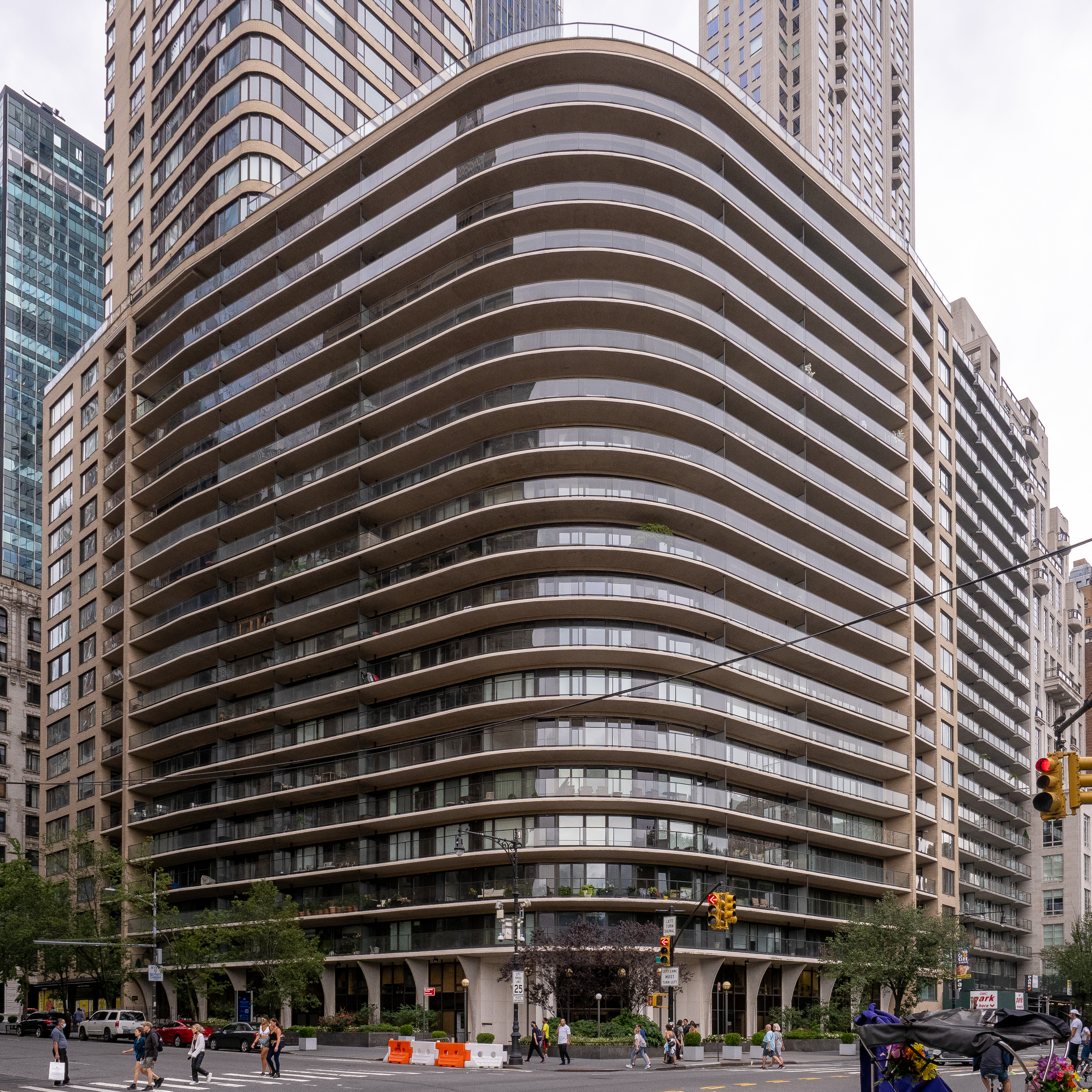
- Interactive map of the 200 Central Park South area

General information
- Type: Residential co-op apartment
- Architectural style: Modern
- Location: Corner of 7th Avenue and Central Park South, Midtown Manhattan, New York City
- Coordinates: 40°46′00″N 73°58′47″W
- Completed: 1963

Technical details
- Floor count: 34

Design and construction
- Architects: Wechsler & Schimenti
- Developer: Bernard Spitzer, Melvin Lipman

Other information
- Number of units: 309

Website
- 200-centralparksouth.com

200 Central Park South is a Modern-style building on the south side of Central Park in Midtown Manhattan, New York City, at the corner of 7th Avenue and Central Park South (59th Street). It is most notable for its curving facade, banded by balconies. Its exterior is beige brick and glass. It is across from a major pedestrian and vehicle entrance into Central Park, known as the "Merchant's Gate". This full service building was completed in 1963 by Bernard Spitzer and Melvin Lipman. (Note: Some sources give a conflicting construction date of 1965.) It was designed by Wechsler & Schimenti.

== Architecture ==
The building contains a curved facade and is lined with terraces that taper in, then curve, and taper out as they wrap around the two faces of the building. The curved base gives views of Central Park to more apartments. Spitzer reportedly got the idea for the curve from the curve drawn by a pencil thrown in frustration. Its tapered balconies have been said to give it a Barcelona feel. The base rises 21 stories, while its tower is set back, and brings it up 14 more floors.

As of 2016 it is a full-service residential co-op apartment building. This Midtown West building currently has 309 apartments spanning 34 floors. Amenities for its residents include a roof deck, elevator operators, maid service, valet, garage, and concierge. In 2016, it is rated as the #2 co-op building in Midtown, and #13 in Manhattan, according to CityRealty.

The building’s design was explained by Robert A. M. Stern, Thomas Mellins and David Fishman in their book, New York 1960 as "a kind of aggressive, self-referential Modernism that had hitherto been largely absent from Manhattan." Horsley asserts it resembles the Fontainebleau Hotel (1954), in Miami, designed by Morris Lapidus.

The building sits across Seventh Avenue from the New York Athletic Club, to the east. It is also near Alwyn Court to the southeast, the Saint Thomas Choir School to the south, and 220 Central Park South to the west.

== Residents ==
Residents have included:

- Raquel Welch
- Dino De Laurentiis
- Durward Kirby
- Al Roker
- Doris Roberts
- Bernard Spitzer
- Bill Bradley
- Elizabeth Ray
- Jacqueline Susann
