= Van Cleef & Arpels =

French luxury jeweler

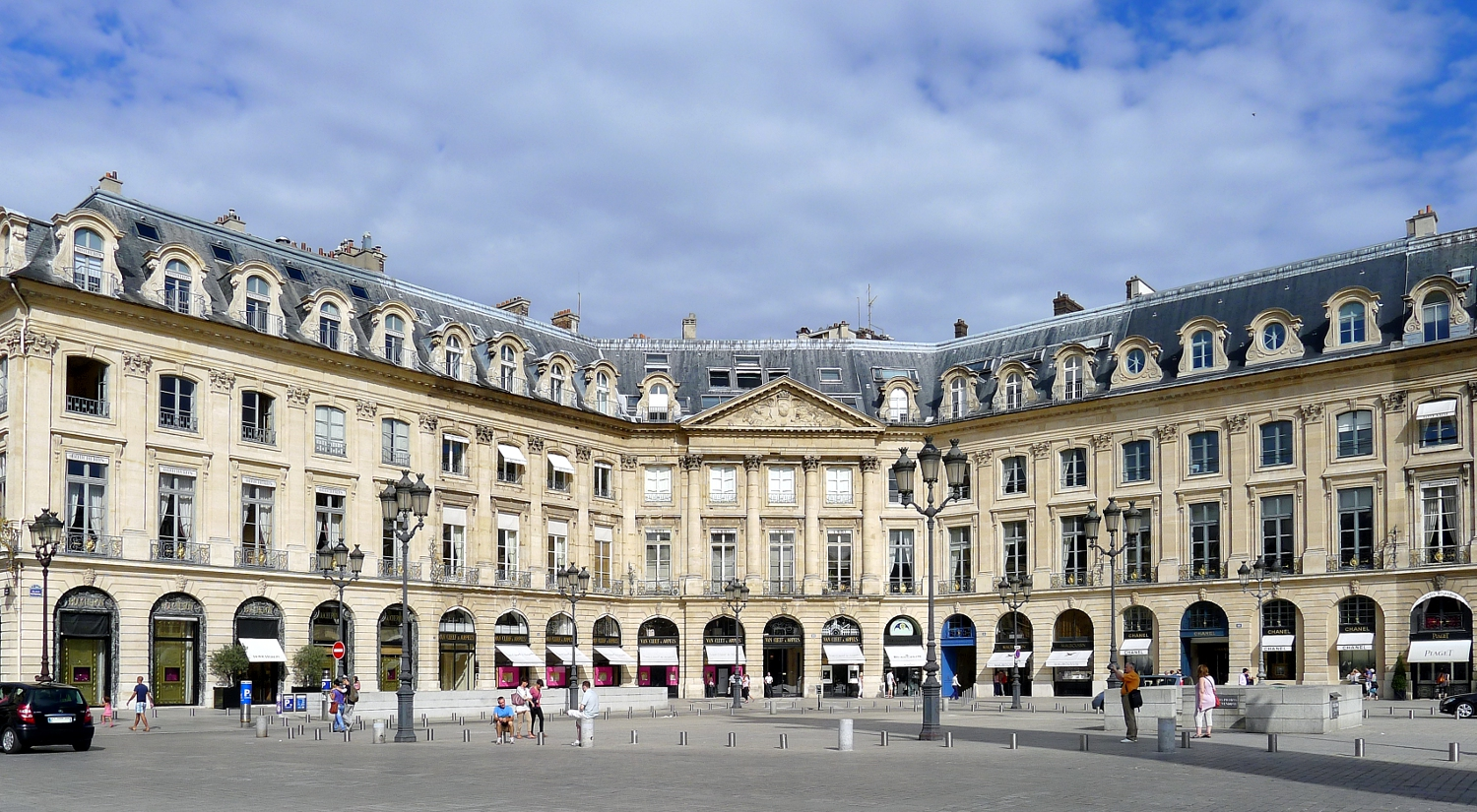
- Flagship location at Place Vendôme in Paris
- Type: Subsidiary
- Industry: Luxury goods
- Founded: 1896; 130 years ago
- Founders: Alfred Van Cleef; Salomon Arpels
- Headquarters: Paris, France
- Number of locations: 155 (2022)
- Area served: Worldwide
- Key people: Catherine Rénier (CEO)
- Products: High jewelry; watches; perfumes
- Parent: Richemont
- Website: vancleefarpels.com

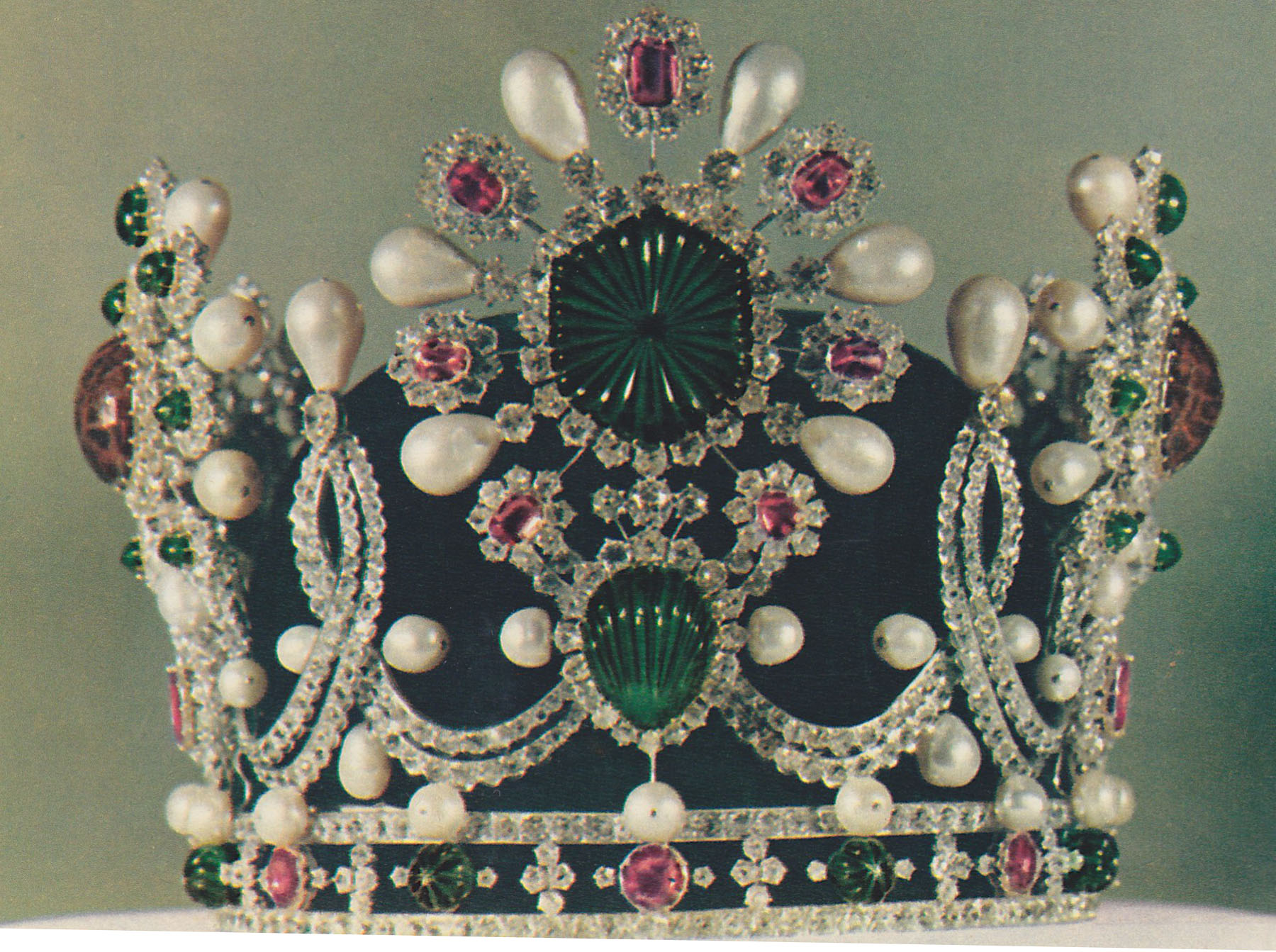
Van Cleef & Arpels-designed crown of Empress Farah Pahlavi of Iran. She wore the crown in 1967 coronation ceremony.

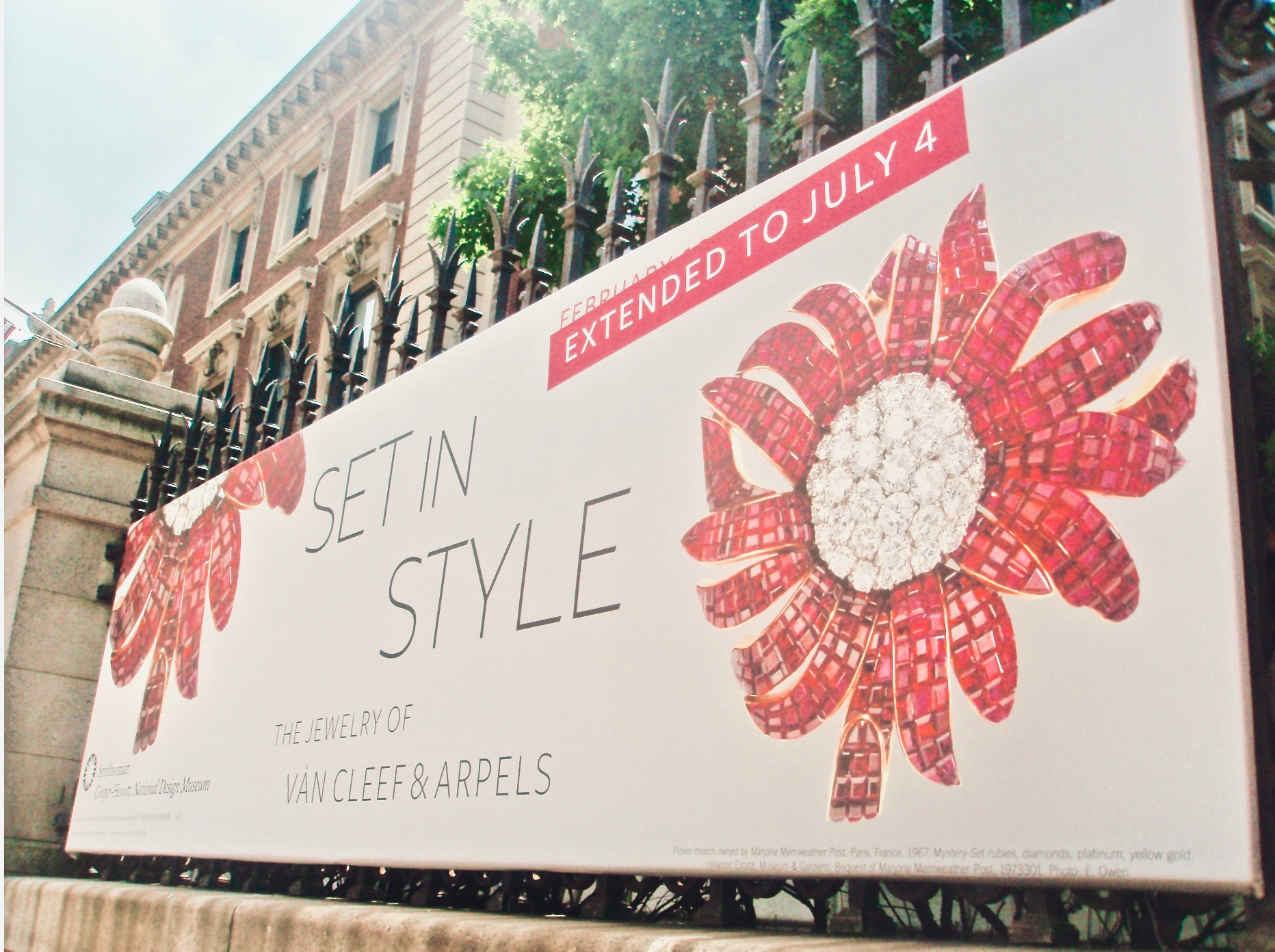
Exhibition at the Cooper-Hewitt National Design Museum, New York in 2011

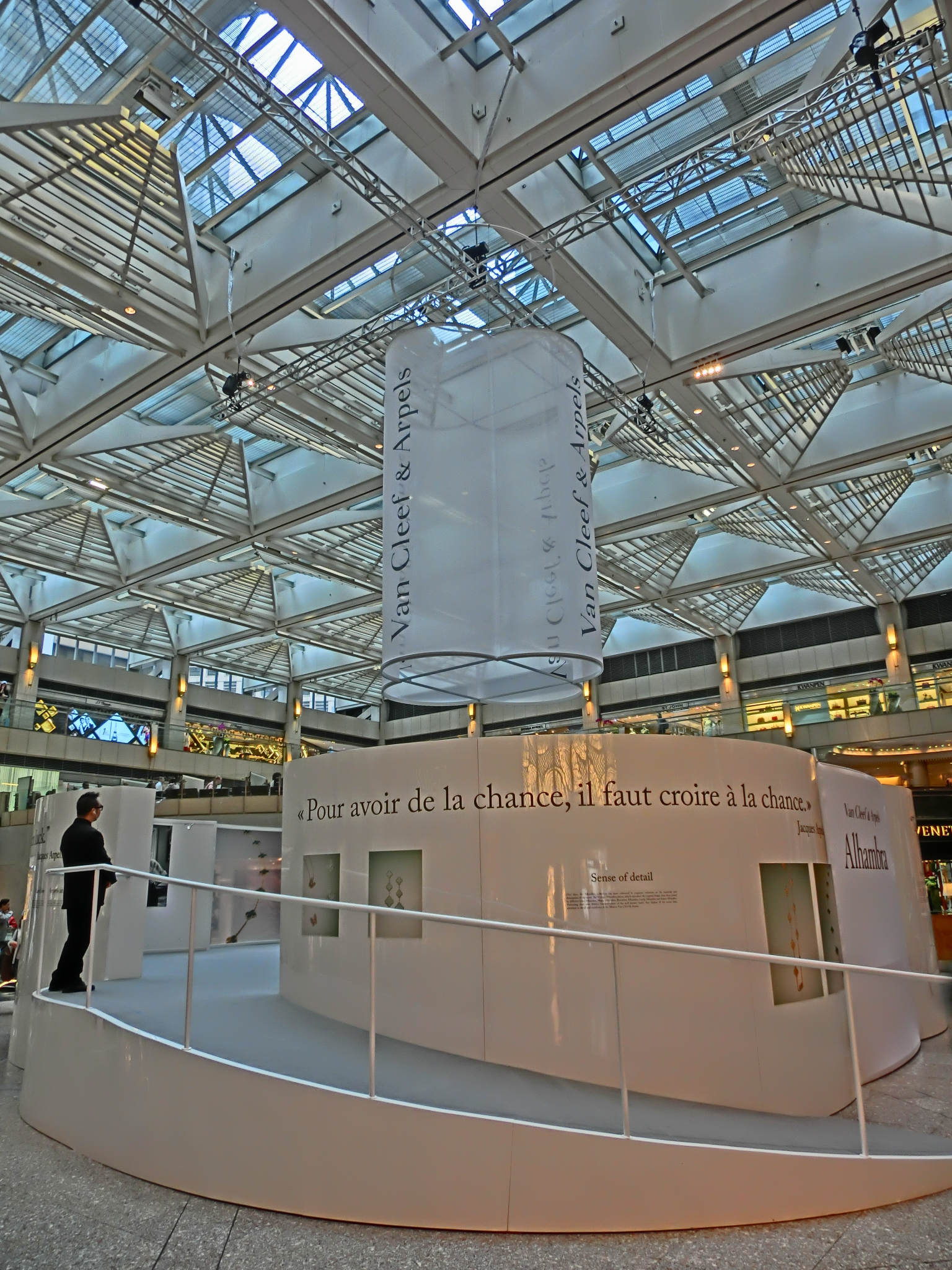
Pop-up exhibition in The Landmark, Hong Kong (2013)

Van Cleef & Arpels is a French luxury jewelry company. It was founded in 1896 by Alfred Van Cleef and his father-in-law Salomon (aka Charles) Arpels in Paris, France. The company's pieces often feature flowers, animals and fairies.

== History ==
The business was established in 1896 by Dutch diamond-cutter Alfred Van Cleef and his father-in-law, Salomon Arpels. In 1906, following the death of Arpels, Alfred and two of his brothers-in-law, Salomon (aka Charles) and Julien Arpels, acquired space at 22 Place Vendôme across from the Hôtel Ritz, where Van Cleef & Arpels opened its first boutique. The third Arpels brother, Louis, joined the company in 1913.

Van Cleef & Arpels opened boutiques in holiday resorts such as Deauville, Vichy, Le Touquet, Nice, and Monte-Carlo. In 1925, a Van Cleef & Arpels bracelet with red and white roses fashioned from rubies and diamonds won the grand prize at the International Exposition of Modern Industrial and Decorative Arts.

Alfred and Esther’s daughter, Renée (born Rachel) Puissant, assumed the company’s artistic direction in 1926. Puissant worked closely with draftsman René Sim Lacaze for the next twenty years. Van Cleef & Arpels was the first French jeweler to open boutiques in Japan and China.

Van Cleef & Arpels was charged with the task of making the crown of Queen Nazli of Egypt during the 1930s.

In 1940, Van Cleef & Arpels expanded to the Western Hemisphere, opening its flagship store at 744 Fifth Avenue in Manhattan, where it has remained to the present day. The boutique was entirely redesigned and upgraded to match the elegance of the Paris store in 2013.

In 1966, Van Cleef & Arpels was charged with the task of making the crown of Empress Farah Pahlavi for her upcoming coronation in 1967. A significant challenge in creating the crown was that all the precious stones had to be selected from the Imperial Treasury of Iran, and none of the gems could leave the country, so the work had to be done there. A team was sent to Iran to choose the major gems to use for the crown. After 11 months of work, the company presented the empress with a crown made of emerald velvet set with 36 emeralds, 36 rubies, 105 pearls and 1,469 diamonds.

In 1999, Richemont acquired the firm.

In 2024, Nicolas Bos, head of Van Cleef & Arpels since 2013, was appointed CEO of Richemont.

== Boutiques ==
Van Cleef & Arpels has 155 stores. Products are in standalone boutiques, boutiques within major department stores, and in independent stores. Standalone boutiques are present in Geneva, Zürich, Vienna, Munich, London, Milan, Shanghai and Paris, where the company has multiple locations, including its flagship store at Place Vendôme.

In the United States, the company operates standalone boutiques in Boston, Dallas, Las Vegas, Manhasset, Naples, Palm Beach, San Francisco, Bal Harbour, Chicago, Houston, McLean, King of Prussia, Short Hills, Aspen, Beverly Hills, Costa Mesa and Miami alongside its New York City flagship store, which was redesigned in 2013. The Chicago boutique opened in 2001 at 636 North Michigan Avenue and moved to a larger location within the Drake Hotel in November 2011. They also operate boutiques within selected Neiman Marcus stores.

The brand expanded to Australia in 2016, opening a boutique at Collins Street, Melbourne. The following year, another boutique opened at Castlereagh Street, Sydney. A second Melbourne boutique opened in 2018 in the Chadstone Shopping Centre. They continued their expansion into Oceania in 2022, when a store opened in New Zealand on Auckland's Queen Street.

They also operate independent boutiques in the Middle East, South America and Asia.

== Notable clients ==
Van Cleef & Arpels jewellery has been worn by style icons and royalty such as Grace Kelly; Jacqueline Kennedy Onassis; Diana, Princess of Wales; Ava Gardner; Farah Pahlavi; Eva Perón; Elizabeth Taylor; the Duchess of Windsor; Queen Nazli of Egypt; Queen Camilla; Gwyneth Paltrow; and Reese Witherspoon. Tennis players such as Grigor Dimitrov, Aryna Sabalenka, and Elina Svitolina also have sported Van Cleef & Arpels jewelry.

== Value ==
In 2010/2011, the company's estimated sales were €450 million in total sales and €45 million in watches.

A 1936 Van Cleef & Arpels custom jewelry piece with a "Mystery Setting" sold for $326,500 during an auction at Christie's New York in 2009.

== Bibliography ==
- Alba Cappellieri (2023). Van Cleef & Arpels: Time, Nature, Love. Skira. ISBN 9788857241777.
- Sylvie Raulet (1998). Van Cleef & Arpels. Universe/Vendome. ISBN 9780789302014.
- Vincent Meylan (2014). Van Cleef & Arpels: Treasures and Legends. Antique Collectors' Club. ISBN 9781851497706.
- Éditions Xavier Barral (2016). Van Cleef and Arpels: the Art and Science of Gems. Éditions Xavier Barral. ISBN 9782365110983.
- Éditions Xavier Barral (2018). Alhambra - Van Cleef. Éditions Xavier Barral. ISBN 9782365111911.
