= Ernest Simpson =

British Army officer (1897–1958)

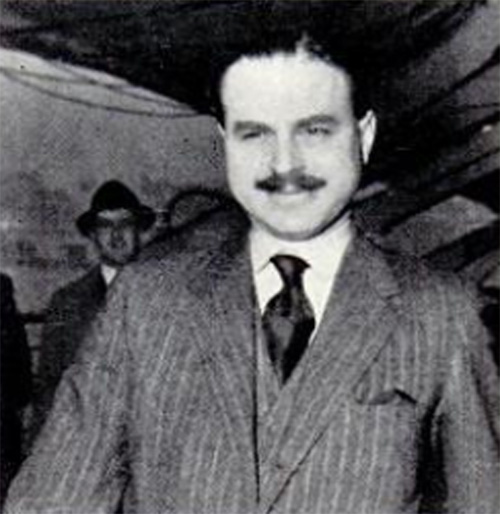
- Ernest Simpson in 1937
- Born: 6 May 1897; New York City, U.S.
- Died: 30 November 1958 (aged 61); London, England
- Education: Harvard University
- Spouses: Dorothea Webb Dechert (m. 1923; div. 1928) Bessie Wallis Spencer (m. 1928; div. 1937) Mary Huntemuller Raffray (m. 1937; died 1941) Avril Leveson-Gower (m. 1948)
- Children: 2
- Military career
- Allegiance: United Kingdom
- Branch: British Army
- Rank: Captain
- Unit: Coldstream Guards
- Conflicts: World War I

Ernest Aldrich Simpson (6 May 1897 – 30 November 1958) was an American-born British shipbroker and former captain in the Coldstream Guards. He was the second husband of Wallis Simpson, who later married the former King Edward VIII following his abdication. After his military service, Simpson joined the family shipbroking firm, Simpson Spence & Young (SSY)

== Background ==
Ernest Aldrich Simpson was born on 6 May 1897 in New York City. He was educated at The Hill School before attending Harvard University. Simpson was commissioned in the British Army, serving as a captain in the Coldstream Guards during World War I. His father, Ernest Louis Simpson, a British citizen of Jewish background whose original surname was Solomon, co-founded the global shipbroking firm Simpson, Spence & Young, (Note: In 1880 two shipbrokers Ernest Louis Simpson an Englishman and Lewis H Spence an American founded the firm of Simpson and Spence and set up an office in New York. This was an era of great change with world trade increasing in volume and steam gradually supplanting the clipper ships and schooners. In 1882 Captain William M Young was invited to join the partnership and open an office in Newcastle-upon-Tyne in England. From then on the firm was known as Simpson Spence & Young. In the following years, offices were opened in London and for a time in other United Kingdom cities in order to service local principals, but it was New York and London that remained the focal points of worldwide shipping for several decades. In these two centres Simpson Spence & Young built up specialist teams of brokers and back-up staff, which were later to form the springboard for future development and expansion. Extract from SSY brochure, 1986) trading since 1880. His mother, Charlotte Woodward Gaines, was American, daughter of a New York City attorney.

His elder sister and only sibling, Maud Simpson (1879–1962), married, in 1905, Major Peter Kerr-Smiley MP.

Simpson became a British subject during World War I, shortly after graduating from Harvard and renouncing his United States citizenship.

"In his younger years he was described as tall, with blue eyes, blond, curly hair, a neat blond moustache and a fastidious dresser," according to an article in The New York Times.

== First marriage ==
His first wife, whom he married in New York City, on 22 February 1923 and divorced in 1928, was Dorothea Dechert (died 1967), the former wife of James Flanagan Dechert (died 1968), a Princeton University alumnus, whom she married in May 1916 and divorced in April 1920. Born Dorothea Webb Parsons, she was a daughter of Arthur Webb Parsons, (Note: This first wife was a great-granddaughter of Theophilus Parsons, a Chief Justice of the Massachusetts Supreme Judicial Court and President of Harvard University.) a lawyer, and his wife, the former Frances Margaret Graves.

Dorothea and Ernest Simpson had one child, Audrey C. C. Simpson (born 1924), who married firstly on 5 October 1945, American journalist Murray Rossant (died 1988, brother of architect James Rossant) and, secondly on 1 April 1949, New York advertising executive Edmund Hope Driggs III. Audrey Simpson Driggs died at Calgary, Canada on 2 November 2013.

Simpson also had a stepdaughter by this marriage, Cynthia Josephine Dechert (born 1916).

== Second marriage ==
Simpson's second wife was Wallis Warfield Spencer (1896–1986), the Blue Ridge Summit, Pennsylvania-born former wife of Earl Winfield Spencer Jr. and the only child of Teackle Wallis Warfield. They married in London, England, on 21 July 1928, and divorced on 3 May 1937. As his obituary in The New York Times noted, the publicity over his second wife's remarriage to the Duke of Windsor and her subsequent fame thrust him into the role of "the forgotten man". The two remained friends, however, the newspaper noted, with the now Duchess of Windsor sending him flowers when he was in hospital for surgery and Simpson offering advice and clarification when his former wife was working on her memoirs.

== Third marriage ==
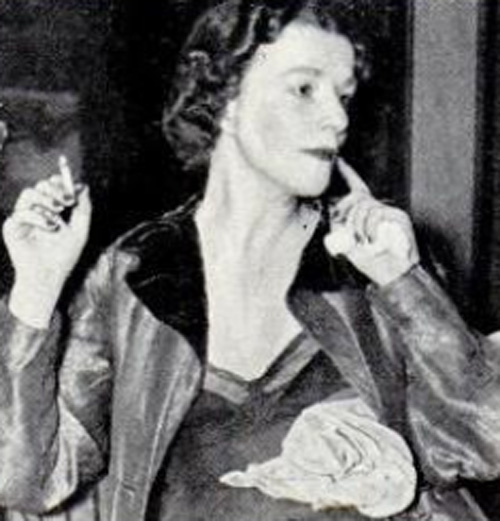
Mary Kirk Raffray, 1937

His third wife was Mary Raffray (née Mary Huntemuller Kirk, 1896–1941), (Note: Raffray was the former wife of Jacques Achille Louis Raffray, a French-born New York insurance broker. He died on 5 March 1971.) a daughter of Henry Child Kirk, proprietor of the Kirk Silversmith Co. of Baltimore, Maryland and his wife, the former Edith Huntemuller, who dedicated her book Her Garden Was Her Delight to her memory. Mary Simpson's letters, along with her sister's, are held at Harvard University Archives.

A girlhood friend of Wallis Simpson's, Mary Kirk was a bridesmaid at her first wedding and introduced her to Ernest Simpson in 1925; she also was the "other woman" with whom Simpson took a hotel suite in Bray, Berkshire, in order to give his wife evidence of adultery, so that she could bring divorce proceedings against him. (Note: As they were married in England they were required to be divorced under English law, where tight restrictions on divorce applied at that time.) Ernest Simpson and Mary Raffray were married in the Diamond Jubilee ballroom of the Brooklawn Country Club in Fairfield, Connecticut on 19 November 1937, six months after the groom's divorce from Wallis Simpson and three weeks after the bride's divorce from Jacques Raffray, a French aviator (son of French explorer Achille Raffray), whom Mary had married on 29 July 1918.

Mary and Ernest Simpson had one child, Ernest Henry Child Simpson, born in 1939, and christened at the Guards Chapel, Wellington Barracks, London. In June 1940, the Simpsons sent their infant son to the United States to escape the Second World War, in particular the Blitz. However, a month before Mary's death, he returned with her to England. Mary Simpson died of cancer on 2 October 1941, at the couple's home – Stanton House, Stanton Fitzwarren, Wiltshire. Ernest (the son) changed his name to Aharon Solomons in 1958 before being commissioned as an officer in the Israeli Army.

== Fourth marriage ==
Simpson's fourth wife was Avril Leveson-Gower (née Avril Joy Mullens, 1910 – 28 November 1978), the former wife of Brigadier-General Hugh Nugent Leveson-Gower and Prince George Imeretinsky. She was the younger daughter of Sir John Ashley Mullens, of Manor House, Haslemere, Surrey, by his wife, the former Evelyne Maude Adamson. Simpson and Avril Leveson-Gower were married in London on 12 August 1948. By this marriage Simpson had a stepdaughter, Lucinda Gaye Leveson-Gower (born 1935, married Sir Spencer Le Marchant in 1955). Avril Simpson was killed in a car crash in Mexico in 1978.

== Death ==
Simpson died in London on 30 November 1958, aged 61.

== In popular culture ==
He was played by Charles Keating in Edward and Mrs Simpson (1978).

He was played by Tom Wilkinson in The Woman He Loved (1988).

He was played by Anthony Smee in Bertie and Elizabeth (2002).

He was played by David Westhead in Wallis & Edward (2005).

He was portrayed by David Harbour in W.E., a 2011 romantic drama film about the Duke and Duchess of Windsor's courtship; the movie was co-written and directed by Madonna.

== Notes and references ==
Notes
