= Condeau =

- Part of Sablons-sur-Huisne
- Location of Condeau
- Location within France Location within Normandy
- Coordinates: 48°23′09″N 0°50′04″E
- Country: France
- Region: Normandy
- Department: Orne
- Arrondissement: Mortagne-au-Perche
- Canton: Bretoncelles
- Commune: Sablons-sur-Huisne
- Area^{1}: 15.28 km^{2} (5.90 sq mi)
- Elevation: 109 m (358 ft)
- Highest elevation: 214 m (702 ft)
- Lowest elevation: 105 m (344 ft)
- Population (2023): 351
  - Density: 23.0/km^{2} (59.5/sq mi)
- Time zone: UTC+01:00 (CET)
  - Summer (DST): UTC+02:00 (CEST)
- Postal code: 61110
- ^{1} French Land Register data, which excludes lakes, ponds, glaciers > 1 km^{2} (0.386 sq mi or 247 acres) and river estuaries.

Condeau (French pronunciation: [kɔ̃do]) is a former commune in the Canton of Bretoncelles, in the Arrondissement of Mortagne-au-Perche, in the department of Orne (and formerly within Le Perche region) in north-western France: on 1 January 2016, it merged into the new commune of Sablons-sur-Huisne.

== Origins and etymology ==
Condeau is a town that lies near the river Huisne in Lower Normandy.

The toponym "Condeau" is a diminutive of Condé, a neighboring town name as the confluence (Gaulish condate) of the Huisne and Corbionne rivers.

== Demonym ==
The French demonym for people who live in Condeau is Condoléen.

== History ==
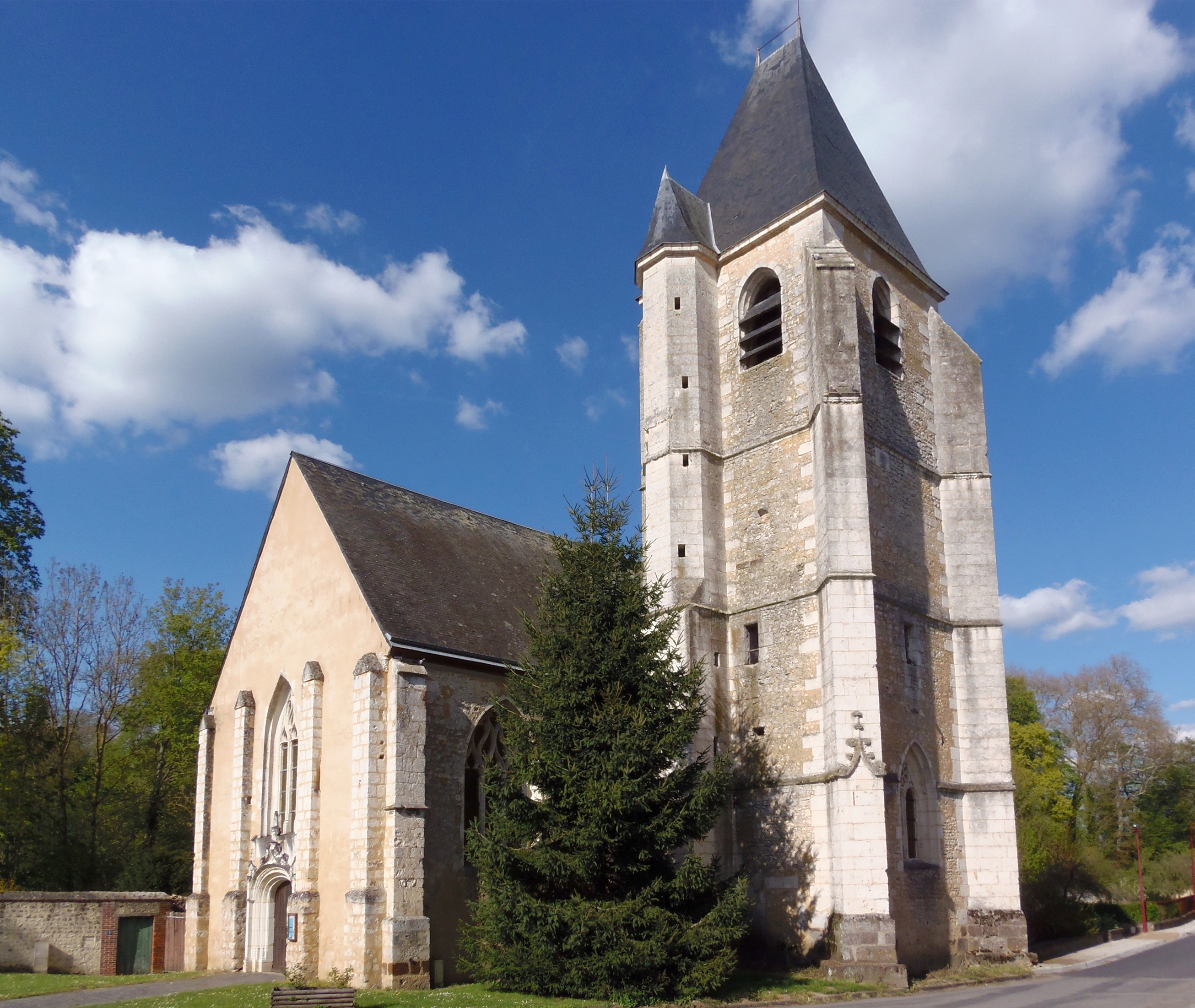
Church of Saint-Denis

In 1789, after the Décret de la division de la France en départements created townships, Condeau became chief town of its canton. In 1801, the canton was abolished.

On 1 January 2016, Condeau merged into Sablons-sur-Huisne as a municipality under by Law Number 2010-1563 of 16 December 2010 on local government reform. The communes of Condeau, Condé-sur-Huisne, and Coulonges-les-Sablons merged and Condé-sur-Huisne became the chief town of the new municipality.

== Administration ==
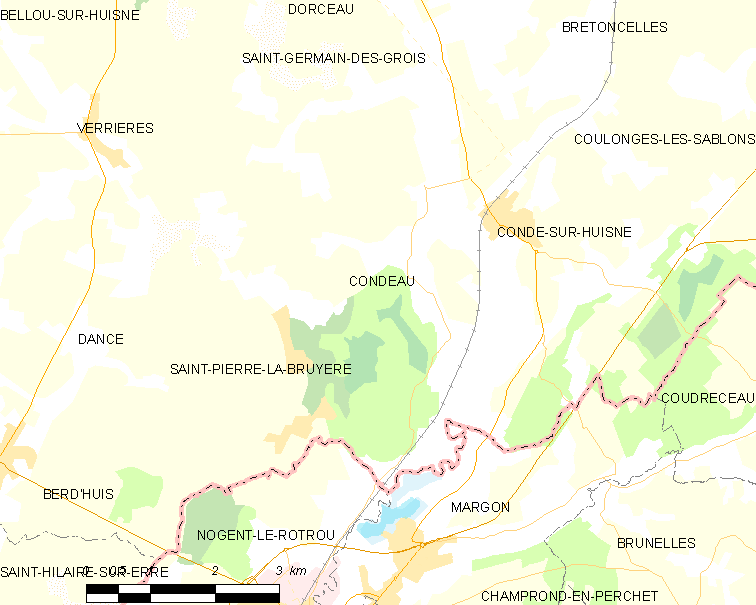
Condeau and its environs

The town council comprises eleven members, including the mayor and two deputies.

== Sites ==
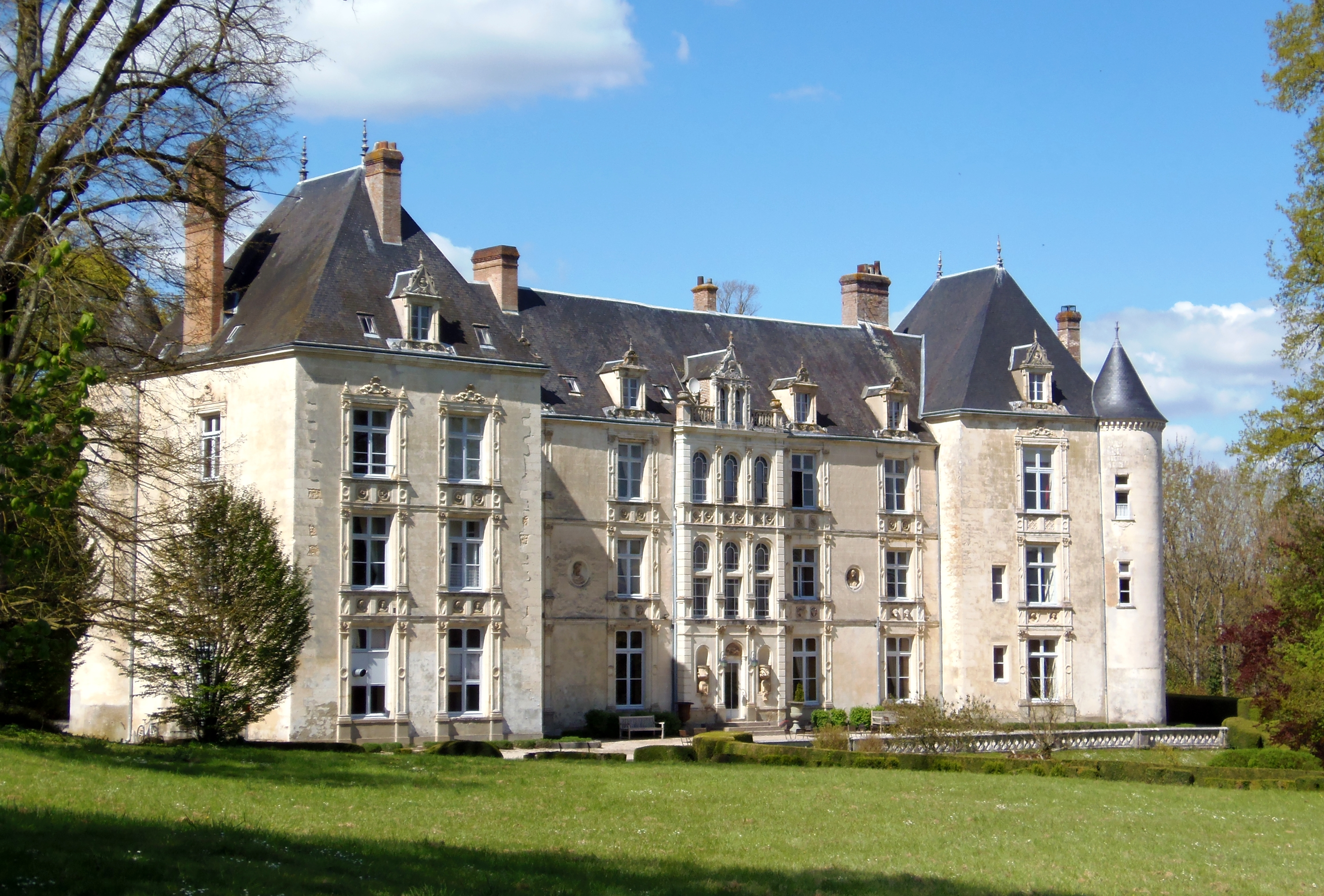
Château de Villeray near Condeau

Sites in Condeau include:

- Church of Saint-Denis (Église Saint-Denis): 16th-century church that houses three paintings registered as historic monuments
- Villeray Castle (Château de Villeray ): 18th-century castle registered as an historic monument
  - Old Mill on the Huisne (Ancien moulin sur l'Huisne): Dependency of the castle of Villeray
  - Manor Grand Brolles: 16th-century chapel
  - Radray Chapel (Chapelle de Radray)

== Notable inhabitants ==
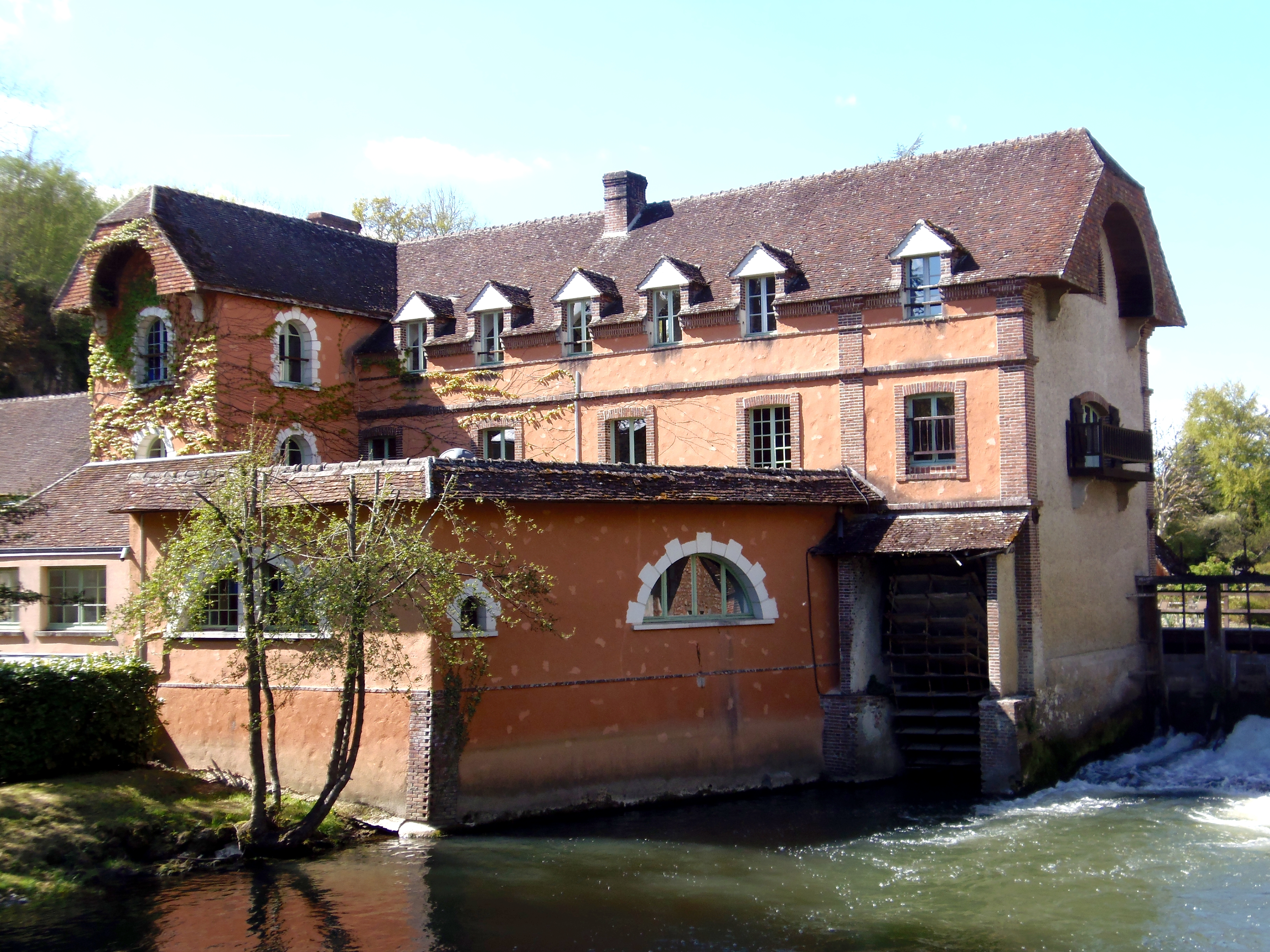
Mill on the Huisne in Condeau

- Jacques-Claude Dugué d'Assé (1749-1830), French politician
- Robert-Jules Garnier (1883-1958), French chief designer
- James Rossant (1928-2009), American architect and artist
- Colette Rossant (1932-2023), French-American writer

== See also ==
Ancient provinces of Perche and Perche-Gouët (with their extant communes listed in text below)

- Communes of the Orne department
- Le Perche
- Percheron
- Regional Natural Park of Perche
