= SSY (disambiguation) =

SSY may refer to:

- Simpson Spence & Young, a shipping company
- ISO 639:ssy, the ISO 639 code for the Saho language
- Mbanza Congo Airport, the IATA code SSY
- SciSys, the London Stock Exchange code SSY
