= Sablons-sur-Huisne =

- Commune
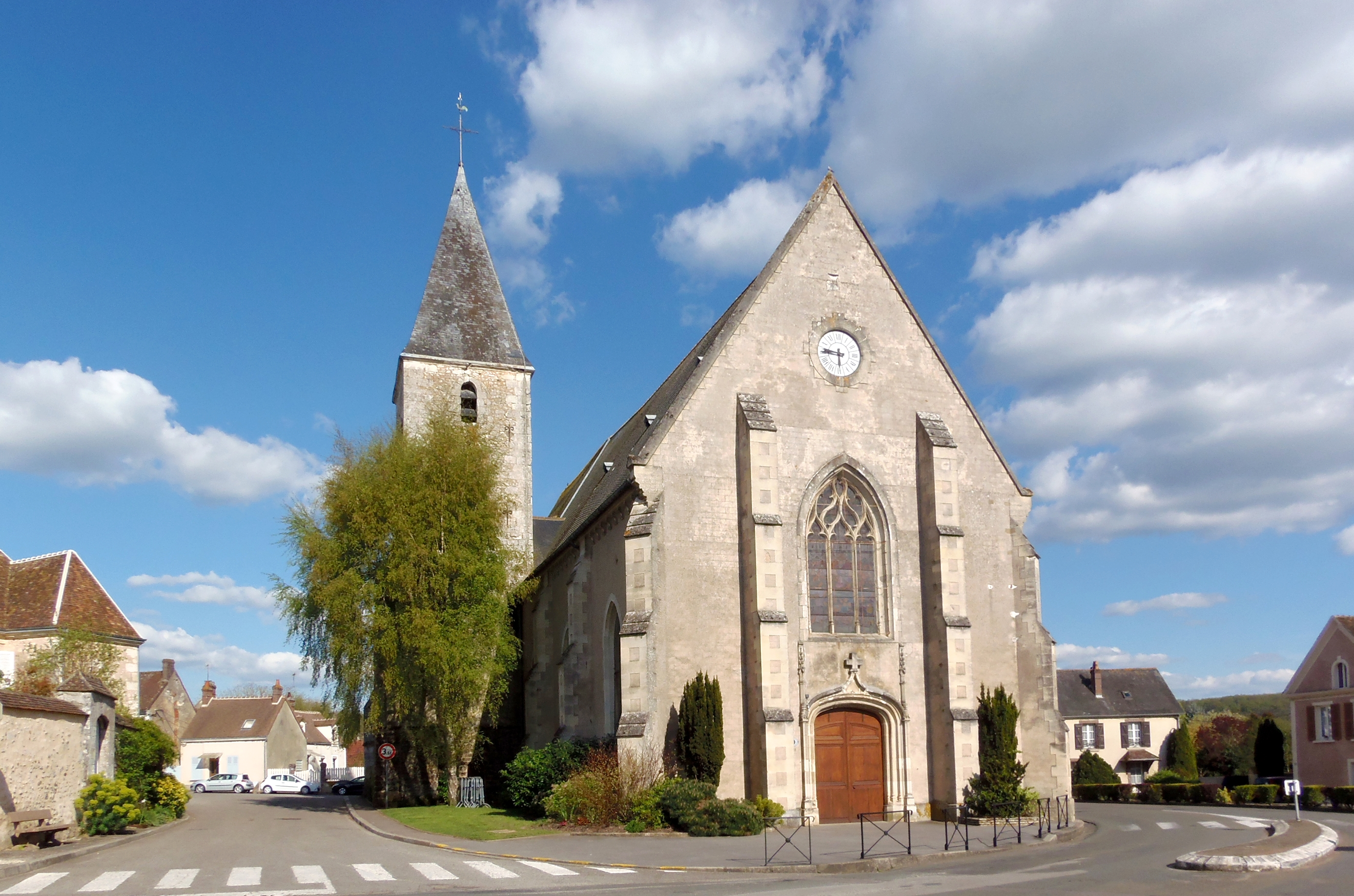
- The church in Sablons-sur-Huisne
- Location of Sablons-sur-Huisne
- Location within France Location within Normandy
- Coordinates: 48°22′48″N 0°51′04″E
- Country: France
- Region: Normandy
- Department: Orne
- Arrondissement: Mortagne-au-Perche
- Canton: Bretoncelles

Government
  - Mayor (2020–2026): Christelle Radenac
- Area^{1}: 52.36 km^{2} (20.22 sq mi)
- Population (2023): 1,976
  - Density: 37.74/km^{2} (97.74/sq mi)
- Time zone: UTC+01:00 (CET)
  - Summer (DST): UTC+02:00 (CEST)
- INSEE/Postal code: 61116 /61110
- ^{1} French Land Register data, which excludes lakes, ponds, glaciers > 1 km^{2} (0.386 sq mi or 247 acres) and river estuaries.

Sablons-sur-Huisne (French pronunciation: [sablɔ̃ syʁ ɥin], literally Sablons on Huisne) is a commune in the Canton of Bretoncelles, in the Arrondissement of Mortagne-au-Perche, in the department of Orne, northwestern France. It was established on 1 January 2016 by the merger of the former communes of Condeau, Condé-sur-Huisne (the seat) and Coulonges-les-Sablons.

== Geography ==
The commune is made up of the following collection of villages and hamlets, Le Haut Plessis, Broutilly, Boncour, La Haie, Coulonges-les-Sablons, Le Chêne Creux, Rivray, La Brulardière, Villeray, Les Closeaux, La Voie, Condeau, Brolle, Sablons-sur-Huisne, La Vaslinière, La Roulandière, La Cour au Doux, Radray, Le Chêne and Bueil.

Two rivers flow through the commune, the river Huisne and La Corbionne. In addition there is a stream, Ruisseau la beausserie that also traverses through the commune.

== Population ==
Population data refer to the area corresponding with the commune as of January 2025.

Historical population
Year	Pop.	±% p.a.
1968	1,758	—
1975	1,682	−0.63%
1982	1,891	+1.69%
1990	1,930	+0.26%
1999	1,872	−0.34%
2007	2,046	+1.12%
2012	2,217	+1.62%
2017	2,142	−0.69%
2023	1,976	−1.34%
Source: INSEE

== Points of interest ==
=== National heritage sites ===
The Commune has three buildings and areas listed as a Monument historique.

- Chapel of Rivray former chapel from the Middle Ages that was registered as a monument in 1975.
- Rivray Feudal mound remains of a feudal mound from the Middle Ages, registered as a Monument historique in 1975.
- Château de Villeray a sixteenth century chateau, registered as a Monument historique in 2002.

== Notable people ==
- Robert-Jules Garnier - (1883–1958) a French art director died here.
- Rhoda Scott - (1938) an American soul jazz organist and singer lives here.

== Transport ==
Condé-sur-Huisne station has rail connections to Le Mans and Paris.

== See also ==
- Communes of the Orne department
