= Charles Towers South Apartments =

Coordinates: 39°17′32″N 76°36′58″W

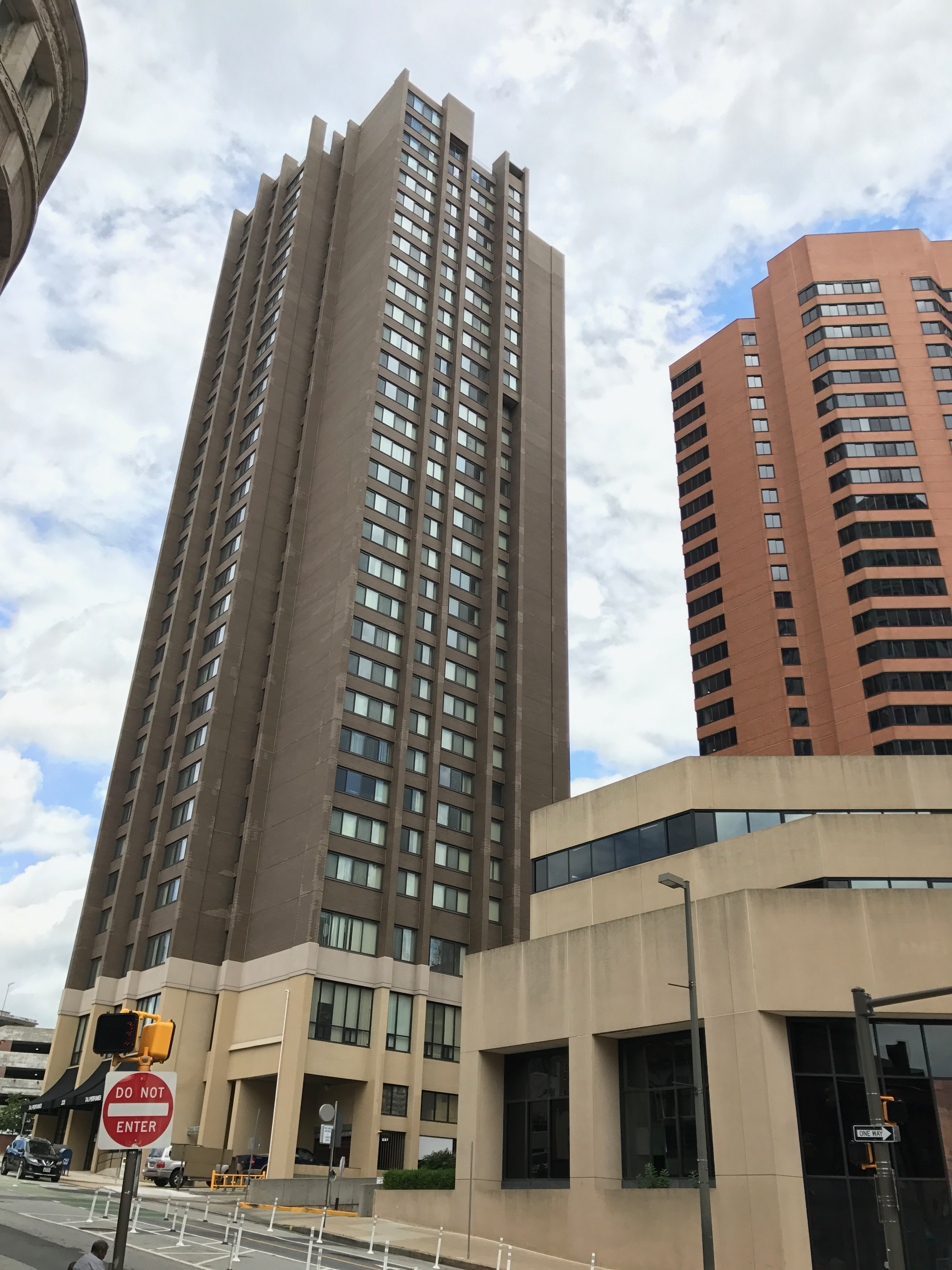
- Interactive map of the Charles Towers South Apartments area

General information
- Status: Completed
- Type: Residential
- Location: Baltimore, Maryland, United States
- Completed: 1969

Height
- Roof: 385 ft (117 m)

Technical details
- Floor count: 30

Design and construction
- Developer: Conklin & Rossant

Charles Towers South Apartments is a highrise apartment building located in Baltimore, Maryland. The building stands 117 m (384 ft) tall and contains 30 floors. The building was constructed in 1969 by developers Conklin + Rossant.

== See also ==
- List of tallest buildings in Baltimore
