= George Imeretinsky =

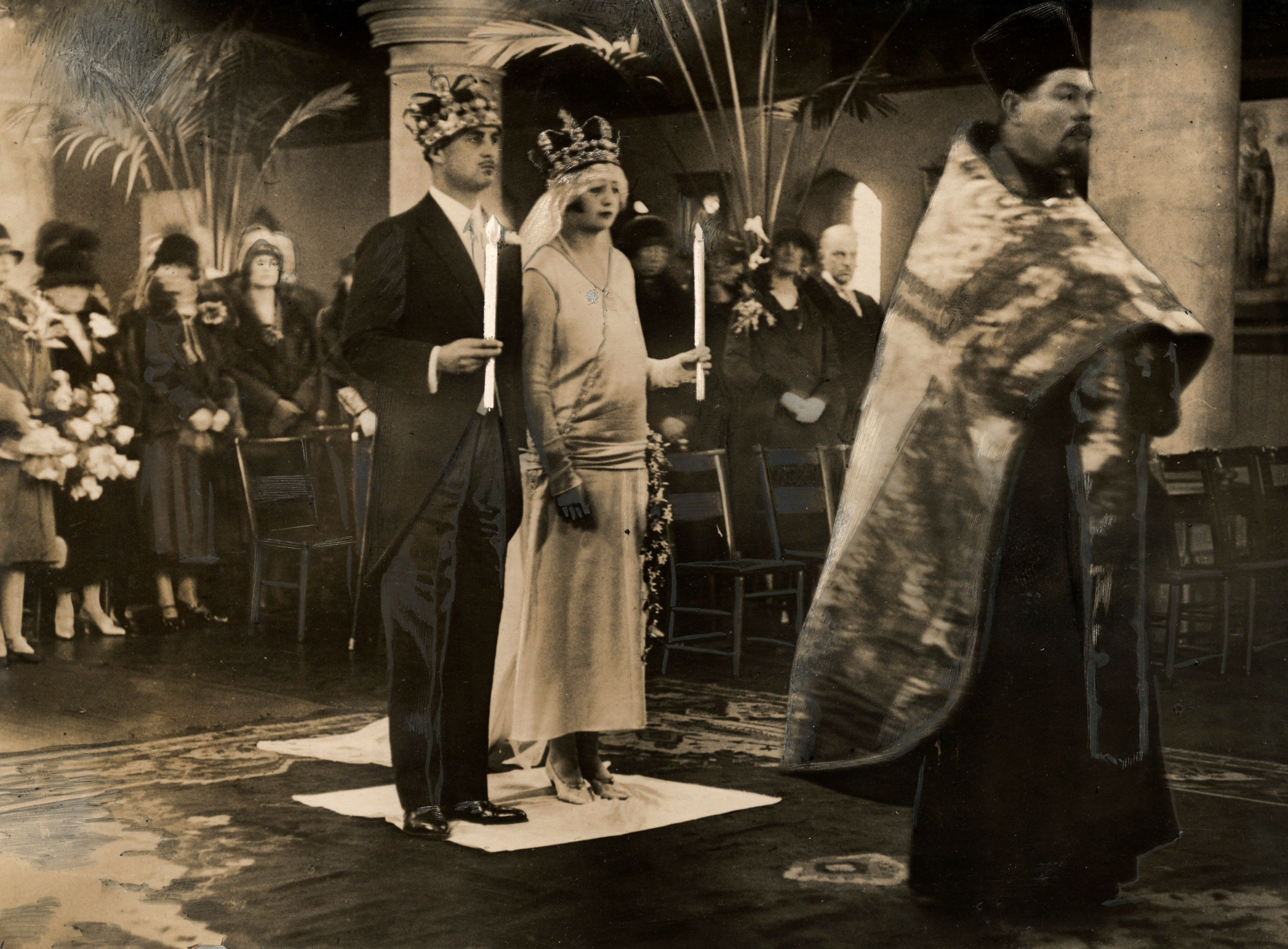
- Wedding with Avril Joy Mullens in 1925

Head of the House of Bagrationi - Imereti
- Tenure: 1932–1972
- Predecessor: George Imeretinsky (1892–1932)
- Successor: Constantine Imeretinsky (1972–1978)
- Born: 1897; Vichnevetz Palace
- Died: 1972
- Spouse: Margaret Venetia Nancy Strong
Names
- George Georgevich Imeretinsky
- House: Bagrationi
- Father: George Imeretinsky (1892–1932)
- Religion: Georgian Orthodox Church

Prince George G. Imeretinsky (Georgian: გიორგი "ჯორჯ" გიორგის ძე იმერეტინსკი) (1897–1972) was a Georgian royal prince (batonishvili) of the royal Bagrationi dynasty of Imereti.

== Life ==
George was born to Prince George Imeretinsky at Tsarskoye Selo, Saint Petersburg on 16 May 1897.

George was a godson of the last Emperor Nicholas II of Russia.

George was educated at Lancing College. In 1916 he was granted an honorary commission in the 1st Battalion, Grenadier Guards, at the request of the Russian Dowager Empress Maria Feodorovna. Holding the rank of lieutenant he was wounded in the Battle of the Somme in 1917, and served with the regiment until 1920. Later he was an officer in the Royal Air Force, a Cresta champion, and was well known in Bentley racing circles, being a correspondent to various motoring journals. He married first in 1925 Avril Joy Mullens, divorced 1932. She later married Ernest Simpson, the former husband of Wallis Simpson. Imeretinsky married secondly in 1933 Margeret Venetia Nancy Strong. His two younger brothers, Mikheil and Constantine were also educated at Lancing, and joined the Royal Flying Corps.

Prince George died in Cheltenham on 24 March 1972.

After Prince George (1897–1972) the headship of the House of Bagrationi-Imereti transmitted to his young brother Prince Constantine (1898–1978).
