= Michael Imeretinsky =

Michael Imeretinsky AFC RAFVR
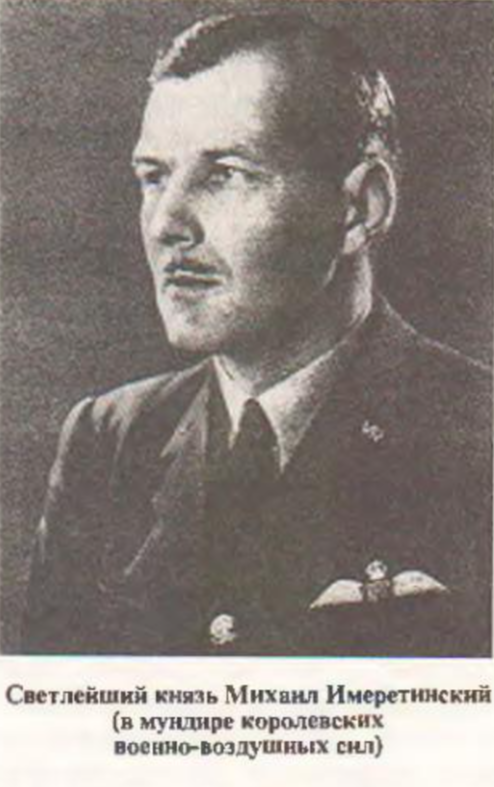
- Born: 27 January 1900
- Died: 14 April 1975 (aged 75)
- Branch: Royal Flying Corps

Prince Michael Imeretinsky AFC RAFVR (Georgian: მიხეილ იმერეტინსკი, Mikheil Imeretinski; Russian: Михаил Георгиевич Имеретинский, Mikhail Georgyevich Imeretinsky; 27 January 1900 – 14 April 1975) was a British military officer of Georgian royal descent. He belonged to the Bagrationi dynasty and directly descended from the Kings of Imereti.

Michael Imeretinsky was born to a Georgian father, "Serene Prince" George Imeretinsky, and a Russian mother, Lidya Nikolayevna Klimova , in St. Petersburg. He descended from the royal dynasty of the western Georgian kingdom of Imereti, which had been conquered by the Russian Empire in 1810. Like his elder brother, George, Michael Imeretinsky received his early education at the Lancing College in the United Kingdom and enlisted in the Royal Flying Corps as a sub-lieutenant in 1918. He fought in both World War I and World War II, serving as a squadron commander of the Royal Air Force Volunteer Reserve on the latter occasion. He was decorated with the Air Force Cross. After his retirement from the military, Imeretinsky lived in the United Kingdom and France. He devoted himself to agriculture, being—as his obituary put it—"a prominent member of the Soil Association and a well-known horticulturist in France." In 1975, he died, aged 75, in Nice, being the last direct male descendant of the kings of Imereti.

Prince Imeretinsky married Margaret Stella Wright (born 1899) in 1925. They had three daughters:

- Tamara Imeretinsky (born 1926)
- Natalia Imeretinsky (born 1930)
- Nadezhda Imeretinsky (born 1941)
