= Condé-sur-Huisne =

- Part of Sablons-sur-Huisne
- Location of Condé-sur-Huisne
- Location within France Location within Normandy
- Coordinates: 48°22′53″N 0°51′04″E
- Country: France
- Region: Normandy
- Department: Orne
- Arrondissement: Mortagne-au-Perche
- Canton: Bretoncelles
- Commune: Sablons-sur-Huisne
- Area^{1}: 17.51 km^{2} (6.76 sq mi)
- Highest elevation: 220 m (720 ft)
- Lowest elevation: 107 m (351 ft)
- Population (2022): 1,241
  - Density: 70.87/km^{2} (183.6/sq mi)
- Time zone: UTC+01:00 (CET)
  - Summer (DST): UTC+02:00 (CEST)
- Postal code: 61110
- ^{1} French Land Register data, which excludes lakes, ponds, glaciers > 1 km^{2} (0.386 sq mi or 247 acres) and river estuaries.

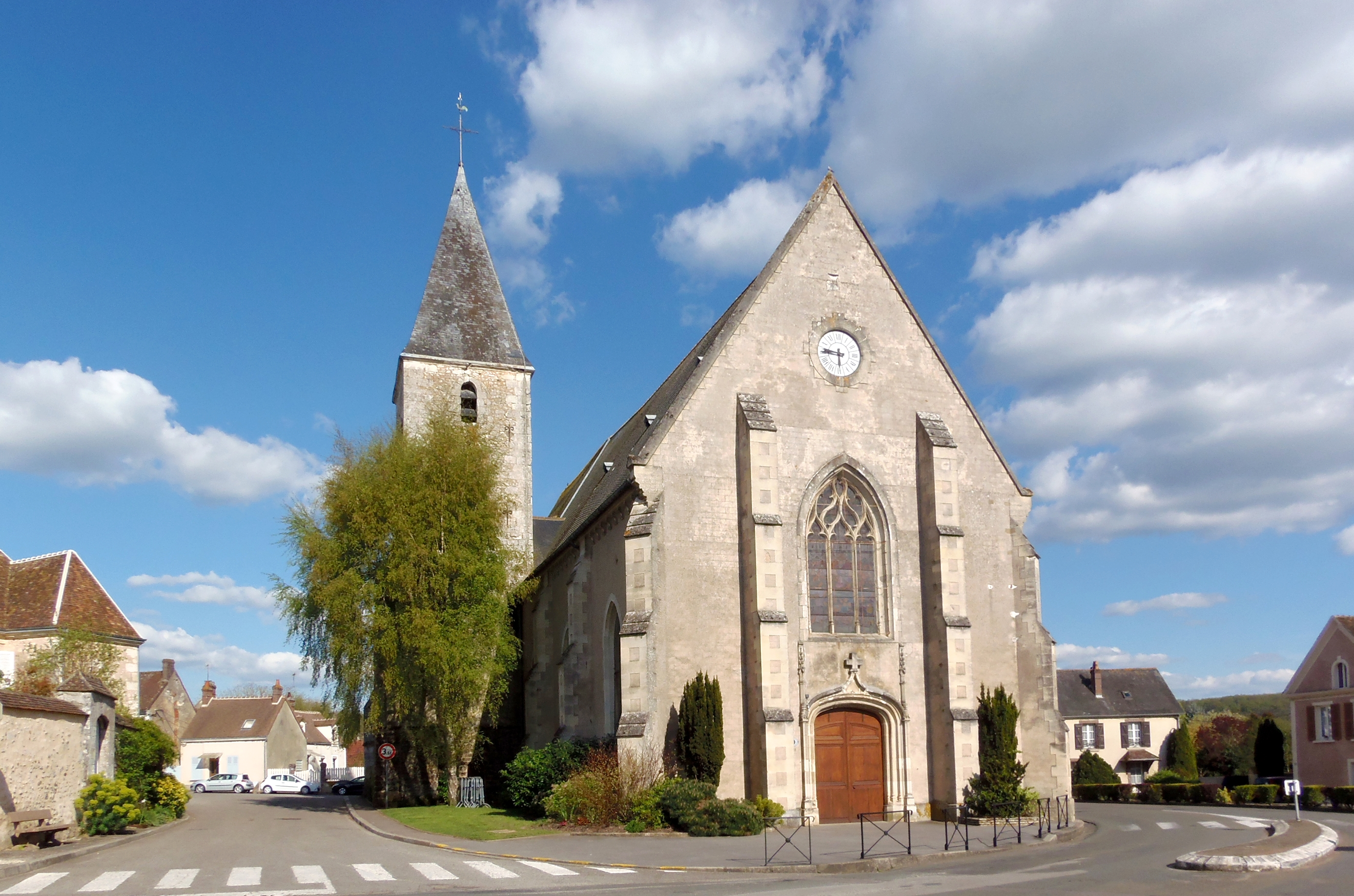
France Normandie Conde sur Huisne Eglise

Condé-sur-Huisne (French pronunciation: [kɔ̃de syʁ ɥin], literally Condé on Huisne) is a former commune in the Orne department in north-western France. On 1 January 2016, it was merged into the new commune of Sablons-sur-Huisne.

== Description ==
Condé-sur-Huisne lies between the towns of Condeau to its east and Verrières to its west and Saint-Germain-des-Grois to its north and Nogent-le-Rotrou to its south.

Condé-sur-Huisne has a large, high feudal mound where a square keep castle was built but destroyed in 1428 by the English during the Hundred Years' War. Only a half-buried, lower chapel dedicated to Saint John the Baptist (12th century) remains.

Crossing the city.

== See also ==
- Communes of the Orne department
- Perche
