= Rossant (surname) =

Rossant is a surname of English, Welsh, and French origins.

Notable people with the surname include:

- Colette Rossant (1932-–2023), French-American food writer
- James Rossant (1928–2009), American architect, urban designer, and artist
- Janet Rossant (born 1950), British developmental biologist
- Lorrie Rossant, British architect and co-founder of the Building Design Partnership
- Murray Rossant (1925–1988), American journalist, head of The Century Foundation

== See also ==
- Pallache (surname)
- Pallache family
