= Eddy Palacci =

French-Israeli chemical engineer and author

- אדי פלאצ'י
- Born: 9 February 1931; Paris, France
- Died: 29 October 2016 (aged 85); Tel Aviv, Israel
- Occupations: Chemical engineer, author
- Spouse: Laora Hurvitz
- Parent(s): Isaac Palacci, Marceline Bémant
- Relatives: Colette Rossant (sister), Juliette Rossant (niece)
- Family: Pallache family

Edmond Vita Palacci (Hebrew: אדי פלאצ'י; 9 February 1931 – 29 October 2016), generally known as Eddy Palacci, was a French-Israeli chemical engineer and author, whose memoirs recount his survival in Occupied France during World War II and help for the French Resistance.

== Background ==
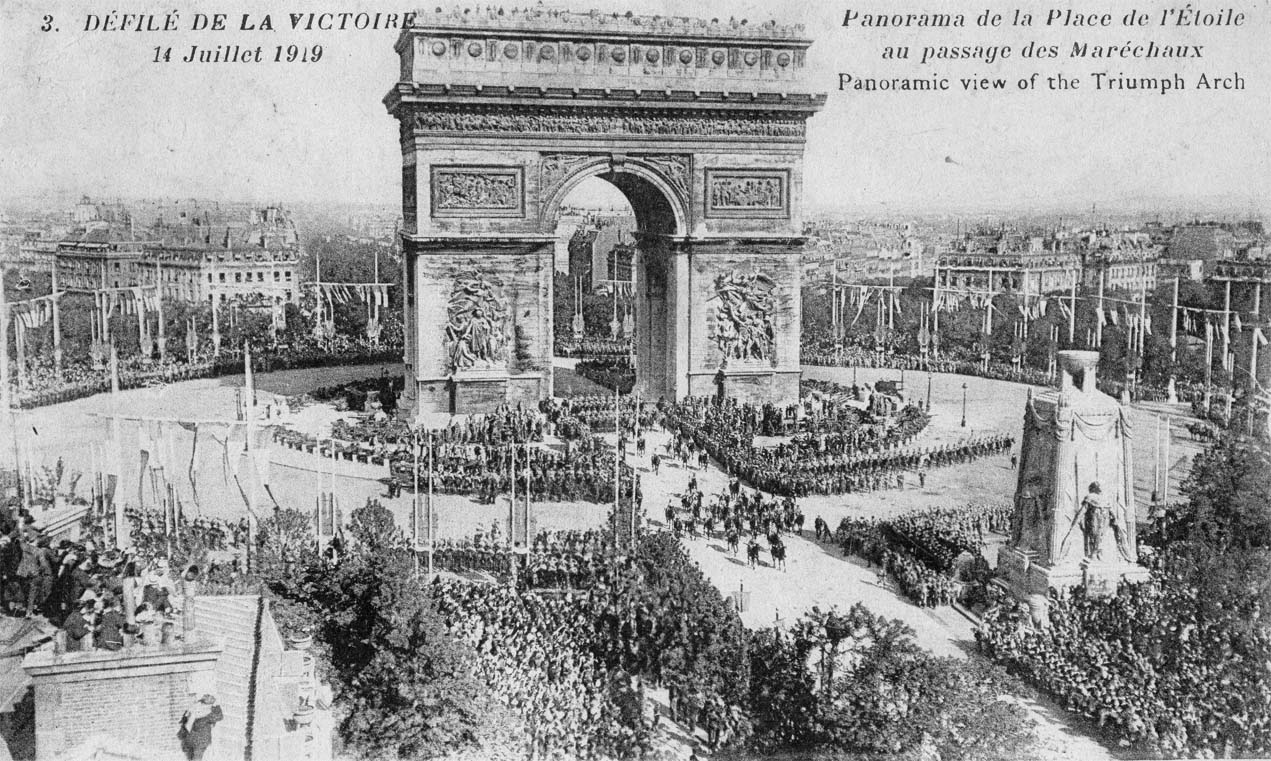
Palacci could see the Arc de Triomphe from his window (here, Victory parade of 14 July 1919, at Place de l'Étoile)

Edmond Vita Palacci was born on 9 February 1931 in Paris. In the mid-1930s, he traveled with his family to Cairo, where they hoped his Egyptian-born father would recover from illness. In the summer of 1939, weeks before Nazi Germany invaded Poland, Palacci's mother sent him home to her parents in Paris.

=== Occupied France ===
The German invasion of Poland in September 1939 marked the beginning of World War II. In Paris, his maternal grandfather decided the war would not last long and that his grandson should stay in Paris rather than return to Cairo, where his mother, father, and sister remained.

When the Nazi attacked France in 1940, his grandparents fled south with him but soon returned to Paris. He experienced antisemitism in school during the rest of the occupation. By 1942, he had to wear a yellow star in public. Seven members of his family were rounded up and deported to the Vel d'Hiv. Meanwhile, his father Isaac ("Iska") Palacci died in Cairo in early 1940.

=== French Resistance ===
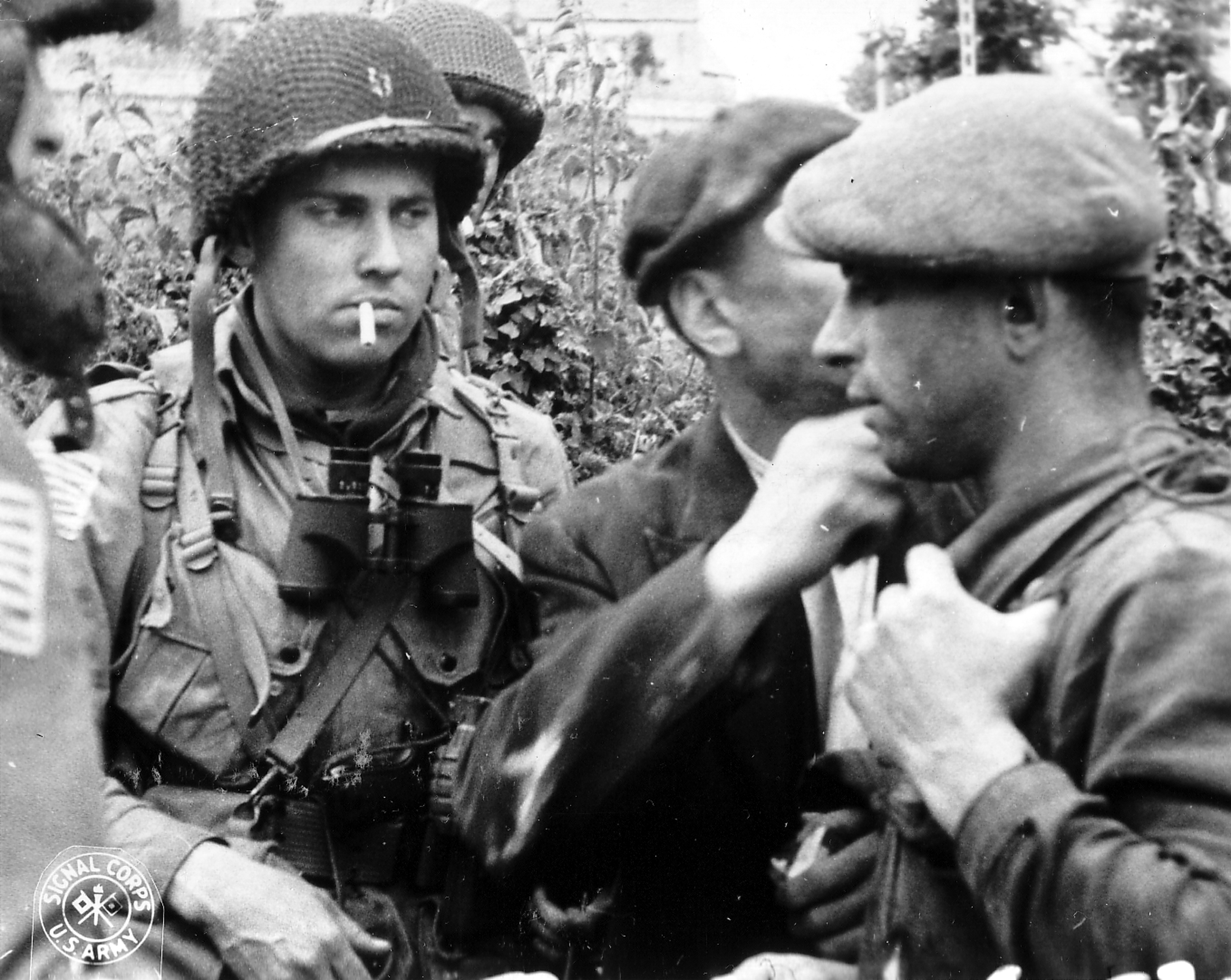
Francs-tireurs and Allied paratroopers reporting on situation during Battle of Normandy in 1944, which Palacci supported

When the Gestapo started a hunt for Jews in Paris, his grandparents decided to hide Palacci on a farm in Les Essarts-le-Roi, near Rambouillet, outside Paris. He spent the rest of the war there (January–September 1944), where he wound up supporting the French Resistance, as detailed in his memoir.

Palacci's interaction with the French Resistance began in June 1943 in Paris, when he overheard a secret "Ventriloque" ("Ventriloquist") transmission on a friend's crystal radio set. At Essarts-le-Roi, he discovered three officers–British, Canadian, and American–on the scene to sabotage railway. They give him a nightly assignment: listen to Ventriloque for messages. Ignorant of their meaning, Palacci shared the messages with the officers. Over time, they gave him more specific instructions. Finally, in June 1944, they told him to listen for Paul Verlaine's poem "Chanson d'automne" ("Autumn Song"), whose first verse contained a signal. On 5 June, he heard the second line started "Bercent mon cœur d'une langueur monotone" ("Lull my heart with monotonous languor"): the original reads "Blessent mon cœur d'une langueur monotone" ("Wound my heart with monotonous languor"). He noted the change to the officers, who went into action. The next day, June 6, 1944, was D-Day, the first day of the Normandy landings.

== Career ==
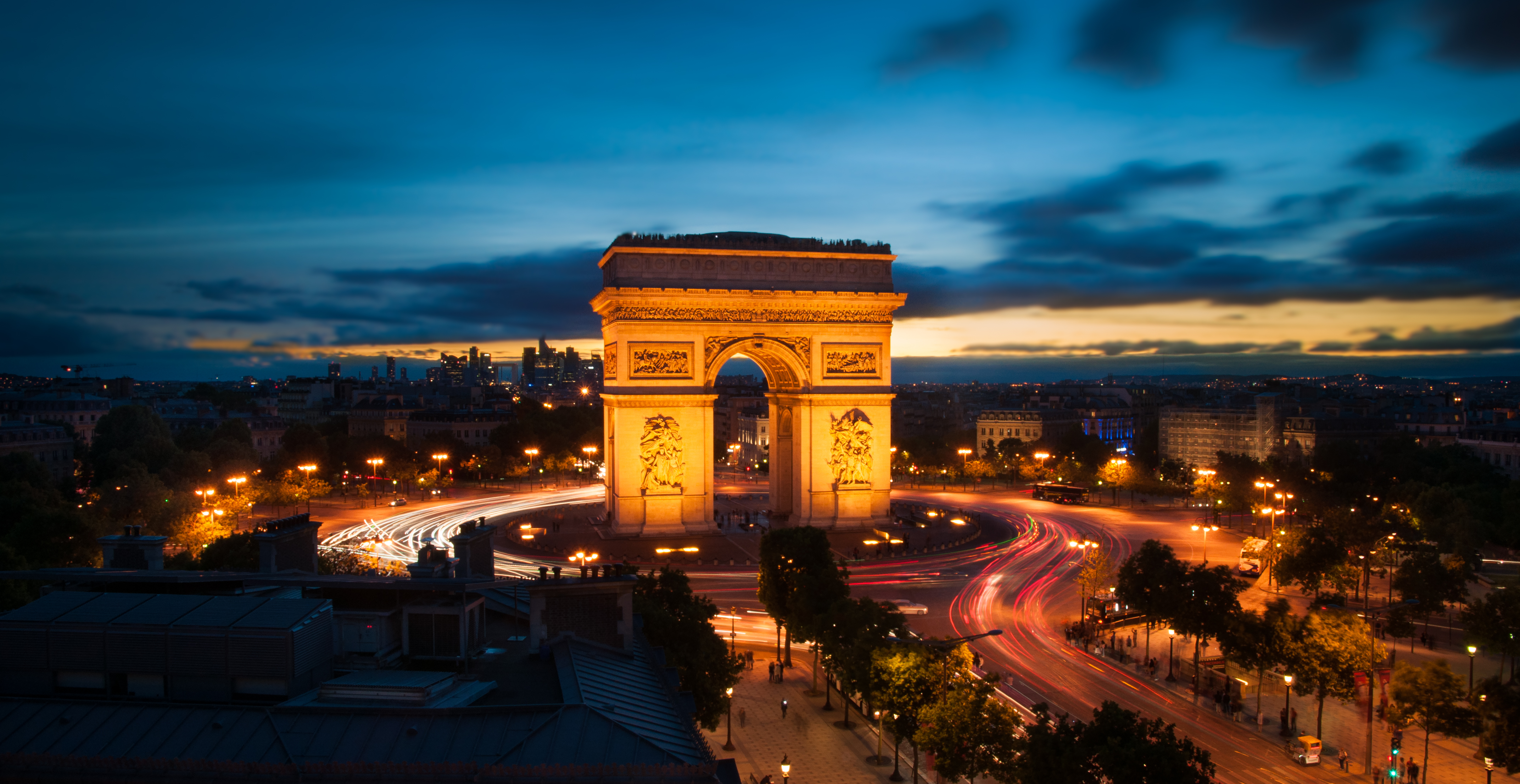
Arc de Triomphe, Paris

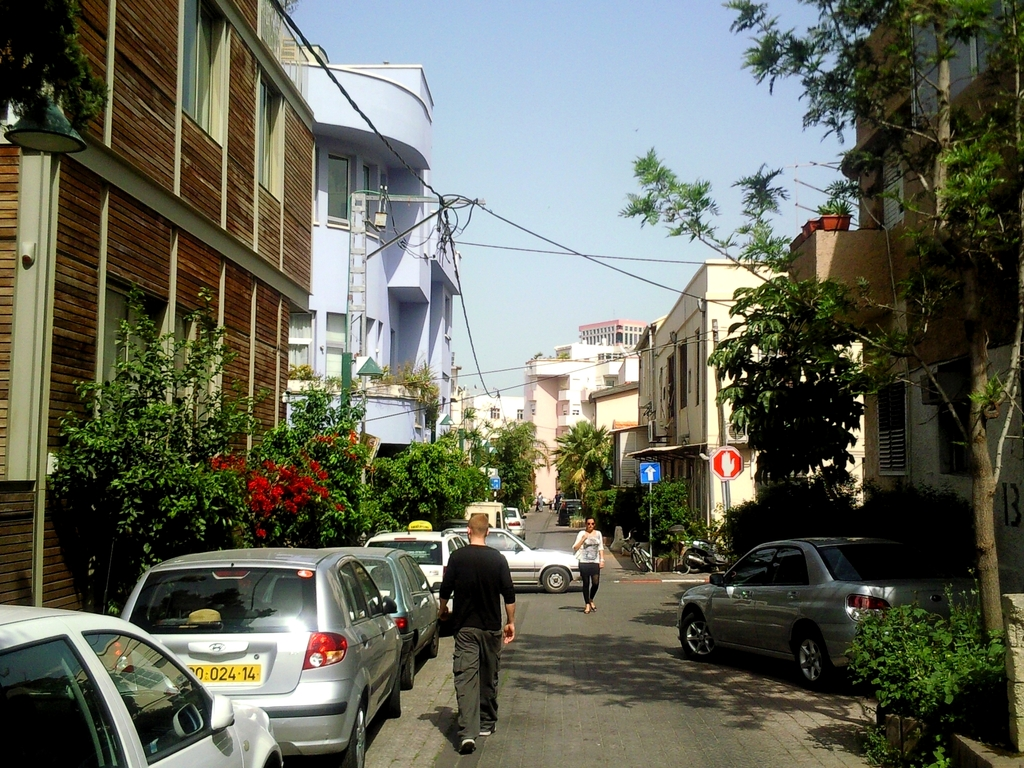
Rabbi Akiva Street, Tel Aviv, Israel

After the war, Palacci learned that during the war his father had died in Egypt and his maternal grandfather in Paris. His mother and then sister returned from Egypt and lived with his grandmother and him in Paris. He finished his schooling and university with a degree in chemical engineering (rubber and polymers). He started military service in 1954 and served in Algeria (1955–1956) as an officer. In 1957, he returned to Paris and worked as an engineer chemist in several plants.

In 1960, he left with his wife to live in Israel, where he worked in chemical industries. He also translated between Hebrew, French, and English and served as an ISO-9000 quality control consultant. His wife also worked in translation. From 1993 onward, Palacci and his wife were very active in "Aloumim" (children hidden in France). For some time, he served as the organization's vice-president. He strove for restitution to those French Jews interned in Nazi concentration camps during World War II. In 2006, Professor Simon Epstein of the Vidal Sassoon International Center for the Study of Antisemitism and Palacci for Aloumim met with a delegation from the Commission pour l'indemnisation des victimes de spoliations (CIVS) (Commission for the Compensation of Victims of Spoliation). He also supported the Judeopedia.

== Personal and death ==
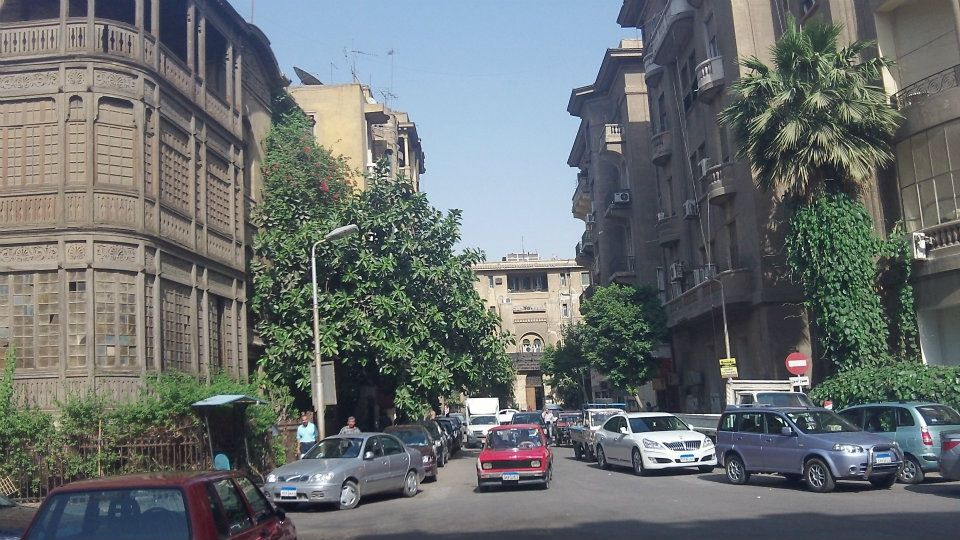
Street in Garden City, Cairo

Palacci's parents met in Paris at a wedding. His father, who was ill for much of his life, returned with his family to Garden City, Cairo, Egypt for warmer weather. He came from both Sephardic and Ashkenazi families:

- Sephardic line: The Sephardic Palacci side of his family left Spain after the Alhambra Decree, wound up in İzmir and eventually Cairo. His grandfather Vita Palacci was a well-known department store owner. His father Isaac ("Izka" in his memoir) worked in exports and imports in support of his father's department store.
- Ashkenazi line: The Ashkenazi branch came from Eastern Europe. His maternal grandfather, "James Bémant," was born "Shlomo Beiman" in what is now Belarus. His maternal grandmother, "Rose Bémant," was born "Esther Rosenberg" in what is now Poland. James' father was a part-time colporteur and pêcheur with nine children. Rose's father was an épicier who became "rich" and had seven children. James and Rose Bémant had two children, Marceline and Charles. Marceline studied at finishing school in Brighton, UK.

In 1957 in Paris, he married Laora Hurwitz, whom he described as a " jeune fille egyptienne née de parents israéliens, familles Biluim (Gedera) et issus de famille fondatrice de Rishon Le Zion et de la Bank Leumi, elle-meme traductrice diplomée de la Sorbonne (français, anglais, hébreu, italien)" (a girl born in Egypt to Israeli parents... and herself a translator of English, French, Hebrew, and Italian, who graduated from the Sorbonne). They moved to Tel Aviv in 1960.

Edmond Vita Palacci died aged 85 on 29 October 2016 in Tel Aviv and was survived by his wife, sister, nieces, and nephew.

== Works ==
In 1992, he published his memoir in Hebrew. It features his experiences in France during World War II. He translated and published it into French in 2013. He also wrote poems and articles for newspapers.

Books

- Palacci, Eddy (1992). Zeakah Ilemet. Tel Aviv: Mirad Ha-Bitahon. ISBN 978-965-05-0637-7.
- Palacci, Eddy (2013). Des étoiles par cœur. Paris: Elzevir. Archived from the original on 10 May 2017.
