= Simpson Spence & Young =

British independent shipbroking firm

SSY
- Formerly: Simpson & Spence (1880–1882); Simpson Spence & Young
- Type: Private
- Industry: Shipbroking
- Founded: 1880; 146 years ago
- Founder: Ernest Louis Simpson; Lewis H. Spence; William M. Young
- Headquarters: London, England
- Area served: Worldwide
- Key people: Stanko Jekov (managing partner)
- Number of employees: c. 650 (2026)
- Website: www.ssyglobal.com

SSY (formerly Simpson Spence & Young, also styled Simpson, Spence & Young) is a privately owned shipbrokerage founded in 1880 in New York City and now headquartered in London. Independent trade press commonly describes it as the world's largest independent (that is, privately owned, non-listed) shipbroker. The firm intermediates chartering, sale and purchase, derivatives and related services across dry bulk, tankers, gas, offshore and other maritime markets, and operates research and valuation businesses.

== History ==
=== Foundation ===
In 1880 the English shipbroker Ernest Louis Simpson and the American shipbroker Lewis H. Spence established the partnership Simpson & Spence in New York. According to the firm's own account, Captain William M. Young joined the partnership in 1882 and opened an office in Newcastle upon Tyne, after which the firm was known as Simpson Spence & Young; further offices followed in London and other United Kingdom ports, with New York and London remaining the principal centres for several decades.

Simpson, born Ernest Solomon in Westminster in 1854, had emigrated to the United States in 1873 and worked as a steamship broker in New York. He remained a British subject. His son, Ernest Aldrich Simpson (1897–1958), later joined the family firm and became known independently as the second husband of Wallis Simpson.

Headquarters later moved to London. A United Kingdom limited company, now Simpson Spence Young Ltd (company number 01037999), was incorporated on 12 January 1972; the registered office is at Tower Bridge House, St Katharine's Way, London.

=== Later 20th century ===
A dedicated research department was created in June 1984 by Phil Rogers. The Singapore office was registered in 1991 and later became one of the firm's larger branches.

=== 21st-century expansion ===
From the late 2010s the firm expanded by hiring and by acquiring specialist brokerages:

- In 2017 it acquired the Copenhagen dry-cargo broker Bidsted & Co., founded in 1940.
- In January 2022 it opened an Athens office and acquired Piraeus-based Anchor Shipbroking, a sale-and-purchase specialist. A dry-cargo team in Genoa joined from Lightship Chartering later that year.
- In February 2023 it acquired Kristiansand-based Westshore Shipbrokers, marking a push into offshore vessel broking. In July 2023 it acquired Hamburg- and Dubai-based F3 Offshore Group, a North Sea renewables and offshore specialist, and opened a Hamburg office.
- In March 2025 it announced an Aberdeen office staffed by offshore brokers previously at Clarksons. Lloyd's List later reported that Aberdeen and Rotterdam were among offices opened in 2025, with expansions in Dubai, Shanghai, Hong Kong and Tokyo.
- In December 2025 it agreed to acquire Grieg Shipbrokers, a Scandinavian firm founded in 1884 with offices in Oslo, Bergen and London and about 50 staff, effective January 2026; the Grieg brand was to be retired and the business integrated into SSY.

Stanko Jekov, previously head of dry cargo, became managing partner in early 2023. In October 2023 the firm rebranded from Simpson Spence Young to SSY and launched a new corporate identity, website and a client research portal branded SSY Navigator.

Headcount rose from about 373 when Jekov took the role to about 550 by late 2024, with a stated aim of around 800 staff within five years. Company materials in 2026 put the network at 28 offices and more than 650 people. Lloyd's List's 2025 shipbroker ranking cited 410 shipbrokers (up from 340 in 2024) plus about 200 other staff in 27 offices.

== Operations ==
SSY is organised as a partnership. In late 2024 it reported 27 partners with an average age in the late thirties. Jekov has described a strategy of turning single client relationships into multiple product lines and of aiming to be a top-three broker in each market the firm enters.

Core desks include dry-cargo and tanker chartering (historically the largest revenue lines), sale and purchase and newbuildings, freight and commodity derivatives through SSY Futures, LNG, LPG and ammonia, chemicals, offshore support vessels and rigs, towage, and ship recycling. Adjacent activities reported by the firm and trade press include ship finance, aquaculture broking (expanded via Grieg) and emissions-related advisory work such as EU ETS and FuelEU estimation tools.

SSY Valuation Services provides vessel valuations. A research department, established in June 1984, publishes sector analysis covering dry cargo, tankers, gas, chemicals and offshore markets. In 2023 the firm launched SSY Navigator, a subscription portal through which clients can select individual data feeds and reports rather than a single fixed research package. Content includes fixtures, freight-rate series, fleet supply and demand data, and specialist publications such as tanker and LNG notes; consultancy retainers can include portal access plus tailored reports and presentations. UK entities associated with the group include Simpson Spence Young Ltd, SSY Valuation Services Ltd and SSY Consultancy & Research Ltd.

Corporate memberships listed by the firm include the Baltic Exchange, the Institute of Chartered Shipbrokers, associate membership of Intercargo and Intertanko, the London Tanker Brokers' Panel and the Worldscale Association (London).

The firm does not own or operate a trading fleet; it acts as an intermediary and adviser.

== Offices ==
Locations cited in company and press sources in the mid-2020s have included Aberdeen, Athens, Bergen, Copenhagen, Dubai, Geneva, Genoa, Hamburg, Hong Kong, Houston, Kristiansand, London, Madrid, Mumbai, New York, Oslo, Rio de Janeiro, Rotterdam, Seoul, Shanghai, Singapore, Stamford, Connecticut, Sydney, Tokyo, Vancouver, Varna and Zug. Counts of "offices" vary slightly by date and by whether recently acquired locations are counted separately.

== Controversies ==
In September 2025 SSY dismissed Gøran Røstad (also styled Goran Rostad), the former managing director of Westshore Shipbrokers who had become head of offshore in Norway after the 2023 acquisition. The firm said the dismissal followed an internal investigation into an image he had taken on a flight and shared in a group chat, which it treated as misconduct likely to damage its reputation. Røstad denied that the incident justified dismissal and said the woman in the photograph had consented to it being taken.

In November 2025 Oslo District Court ordered SSY to reinstate him pending a full hearing and to pay legal costs; the firm appealed. In January 2026 a court of appeal allowed him to remain in post until the dismissal was tried. In March 2026 Røstad dropped all proceedings, accepted dismissal for gross misconduct, admitted liability for what SSY described as a series of wrongdoings, and agreed to pay a settlement covering legal fees and alleged misuse of company funds.

== See also ==
- Shipbroker
- Baltic Exchange
- Ernest Aldrich Simpson
- Clarksons
- Braemar Group
