= Colette Rossant =

French-American food cookbook author and journalist (1932–2023)

- Born: Colette Sol Palacci; 18 January 1932; Paris, France
- Died: 12 October 2023 (aged 91); Normandy, France
- Education: Sorbonne
- Occupations: Cookbook author, translator, restaurateur, teacher
- Spouse: James Rossant (m. 1955; died 2009)
- Children: 4
- Relatives: Eddy Palacci
- Website: coletterossant.com

Colette Sol Rossant (née Palacci; 18 January 1932 – 12 October 2023) was a French-American cookbook author, journalist, translator, and restaurateur, who was a member of the Pallache family.

== Background ==
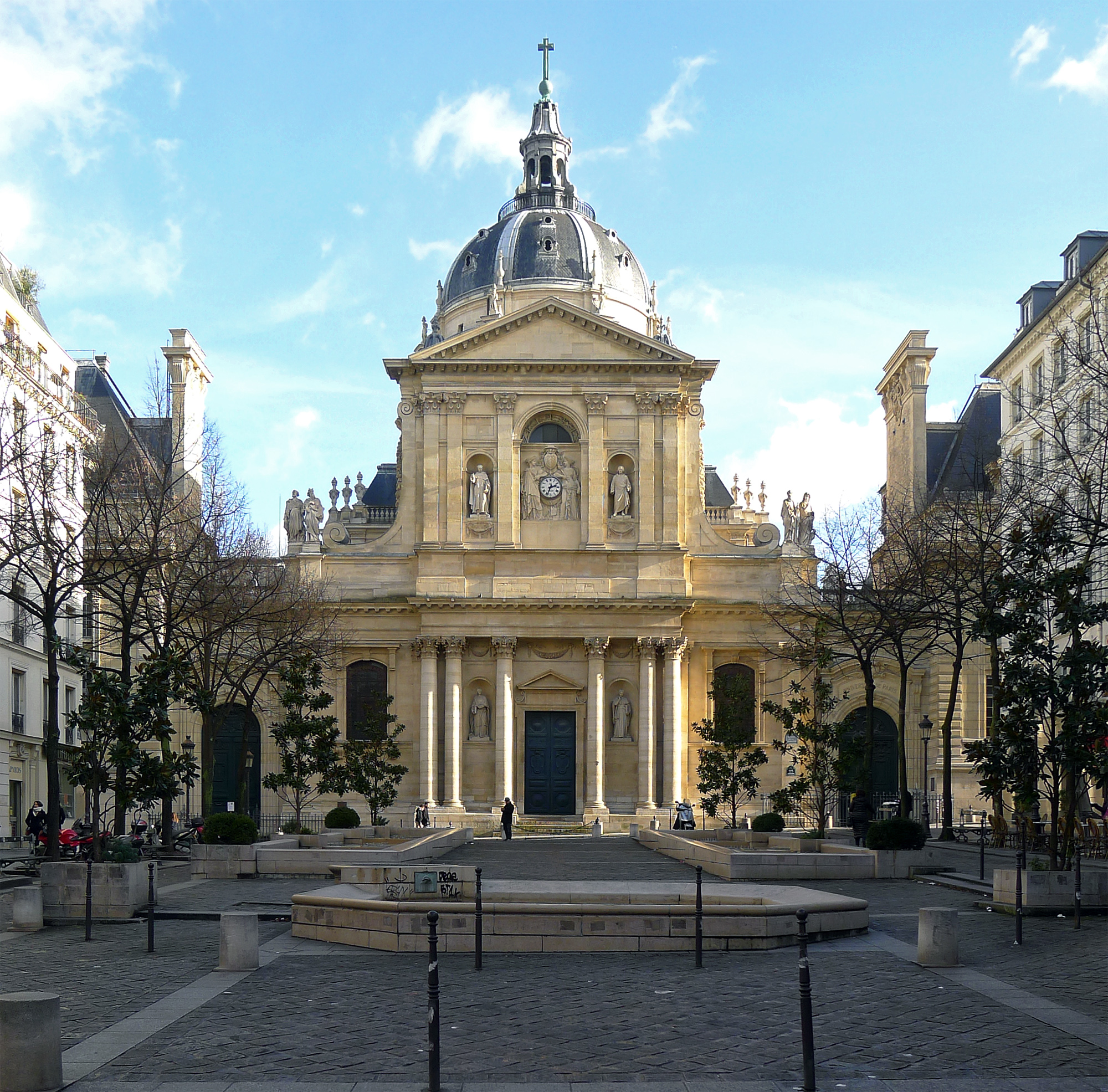
Chapel of Sainte Ursule at the Sorbonne, where Rossant studied

Born in Paris, Rossant was the daughter of Iska Palacci and Marceline Bemant. Her mother was a friend of the writer Colette and named her daughter after her. She traveled with her mother to Cairo to live with her father and her father's family during World War II. Her mother spent much of the war in Beirut (part of the French Mandate for Syria and the Lebanon), while her brother Eddy Palacci remained in Paris with their mother's parents.

After World War II, Rossant returned to Paris and lived with her grandmother and brother, joined occasionally by her mother. In Paris, she studied at the Lycée La Fontaine. She spent a year learning English at Roedean School near Brighton, UK. She earned a B.A. in Comparative Literature at the Sorbonne in 1954. She married American architect James Rossant in 1955.

== Career ==
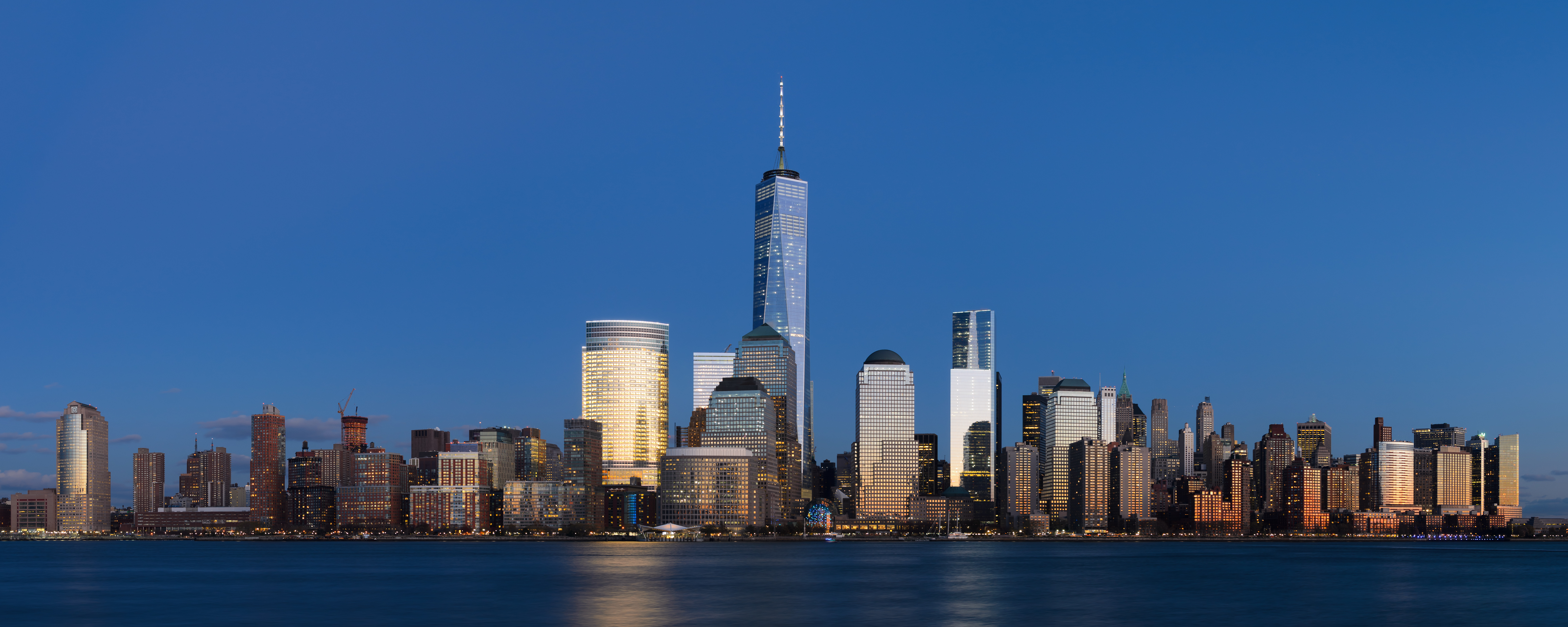
View of Lower Manhattan, where Rossant moved in 1955.

Moving to New York City with her husband in 1955, Rossant pursued several careers, often simultaneously like teaching, writing, translating, restaurant business, and raising a family.

Rossant spent many years teaching French. She was first a language instructor at the Browning School (1957–1961). She then taught French at Hofstra University (1961–1970). She became head of the French department at St. Anne's School (1970–1983). Her last position was as Liaison Officer at the New York branch of Crédit Lyonnais (1985–2000). Exploring New York, Rossant became very interested in bettering the food she found there. She published her first of seven cookbooks in 1975 (and last in 1991). Her third cookbook, A Mostly French Food Processor Cookbook (1980) sold more than 50,000 copies and made a name for her in the Food industry. She became "underground gourmet" for New York Magazine in the 1980s. She served as food and design editor for McCalls Magazine (1983–1990). She then became a columnist for the New York Daily News, where she wrote a popular Wednesday column called "Ask Colette." She contributed to Food Arts and Super Chef magazines.

Rossant helped launch two restaurants in New York. Buddha Green (1998–1999) opened in Midtown Manhattan and featured original, vegetarian "Buddhist" cuisine. Dim Sum Go Go (2000–2003) opened in Chinatown and featured original Imperial Cantonese cuisine, although Rossant had stopped consulting there. Her husband James Rossant helped design both, while son Tomas helped on the interior at Buddha Green. Rossant traveled abroad (often with her husband, whose architectural design work took him to countries like Bhutan, Tanzania, and Turkey). Her lifelong interest in Asian cuisines took her to China and Japan, reflected in her cookbooks and restaurants.

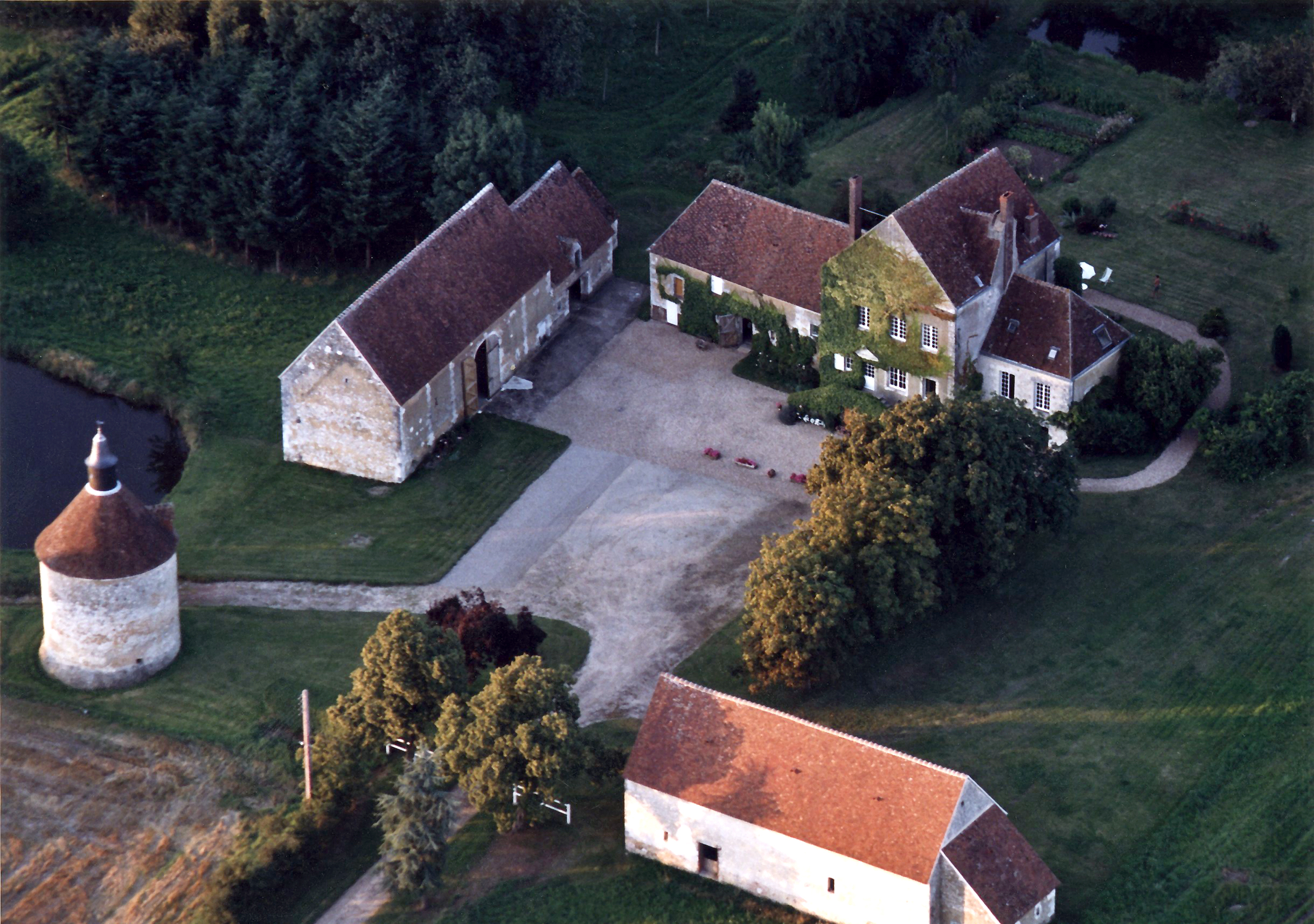
Dorceau in Orne, France, near Rossant's home since 2002

Rossant's last books were memoirs: Apricots on the Nile (2004, originally published as Memories of a Lost Egypt in 1999), Return to Paris (2003), and The World in My Kitchen (2006).

In 2002, Rossant moved from New York back to France, but rather than return to Paris again (as she had as a teenager), she went to live in the department of Orne, two hours west of Paris. In 2009, Rossant's husband of 55 years died. She continued to live in their home near Condeau, France, on whose town council she has served. She continued to contribute to Super Chef, Food Arts, and Pays du Perche magazines and was writing a twelfth book. In November 2010, Rossant received the Prix Eugenie Brazier for the French translation of her first memoir, Mémoires d'une Egypte perdue (Editions Les Deux Terres 2010). She fostered cooperation between Hudson Valley, New York, and Le Perche.

Rossant appeared during an interview in Rebekah Wingert-Jabi's 2015 documentary Another Way of Living: The Story of Reston, VA, along with an excerpt of an interview with Rossant's by then deceased husband, James.

== Personal life ==
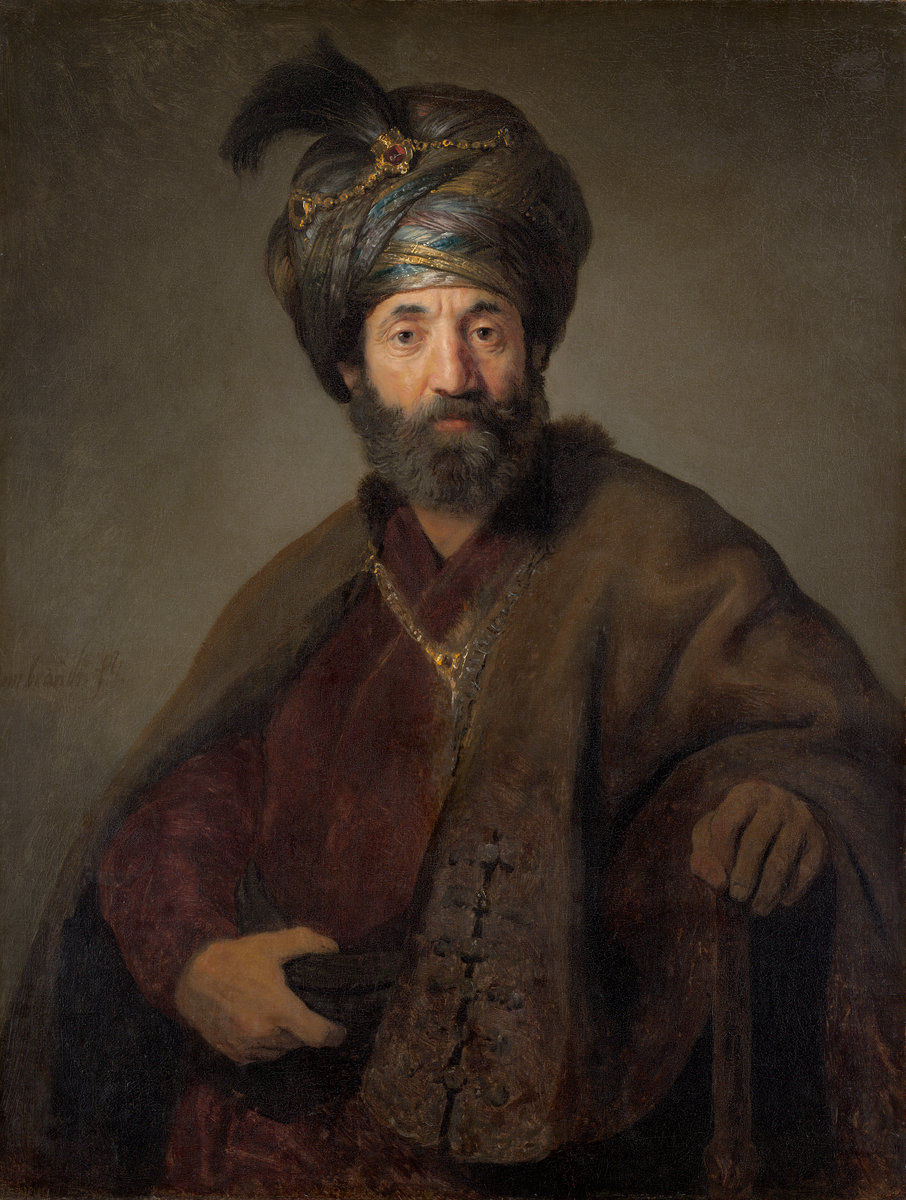
"Man in Oriental Costume" by Rembrandt, thought to be Samuel Pallache (Rossant's ancestor)

Rossant's parents met in Paris at a wedding. Her father, who was ill for much of his life, returned with his family to Egypt for warmer weather.

Rossant came from both Sephardic and Ashkenazi families:

- Sephardic line: According to her first memoir, the Sephardic Palacci side of her family left Spain after the Alhambra Decree, moved to Italy, and then moved to Istanbul. There, an ancestor became a major domo in the Ottoman army. During an Ottoman invasion of Egypt [probably during Muhammad Ali's seizure of power, counting generations], this great-great-grandfather (unnamed in the memoir) moved from Istanbul to Cairo. In Egypt, he owned lemon perfume factories in Upper Egypt. Her grandfather Vita Palacci owned a well-known department store in Cairo and who, "like all his ancestors before him, had traveled to Turkey to find his wife... The eldest son in every generation had gone back to Istanbul to find a wife." Her father Isaac ("Iska") Palacci (also unnamed in the memoir) worked in exports and imports in support of his father's department store. Iska Palacci died in early 1940 in Cairo.
- Ashkenazi line: According to her brother's memoir, the Ashkenazi branch came from Eastern Europe. Her maternal grandfather, "James Bémant," was born "Shlomo Beiman" in what is now Belarus. Her maternal grandmother, "Rose Bémant," was born "Esther Rosenberg" in what is now Poland. James' father was a part-time colporteur and pêcheur with nine children. Rose's father was an épicier who became "rich" and had seven children. James and Rose Bémant had two children, Marceline and Charles. Marceline studied at finishing school in Brighton, UK.

Colette Rossant died from breast cancer on 12 October 2023, at the age of 91.

== Awards and nominations ==
Awards

- 2010: Prix Eugenie Brazier for Memoire d'une Egypt perdue

Nominations

- 1997: James Beard Award nomination
- 2000: IACP Cookbook Award nomination for Memories of a Lost Egypt
- 2002: Thomas Cook Travel Book Award nomination for Apricots on the Nile

== Works ==
Writing in 2007, The Jewish Chronicle noted "Rossant lives and loves through the fragrance and flavour of food" and called her writing "simple and direct."

Memoirs

- The World in My Kitchen (Atria 2006); Madeleines in Manhattan (Bloomsbury 2008)
- Return to Paris (Atria, 2003); Return to Paris (Bloomsbury 2004); Retour a Paris (Editions les Deux Terres 2009)
- Apricots on the Nile (Atria 2004); originally Memories of a Lost Egypt (Clarkson Potter 1999); Apricots on the Nile (Bloomsbury 2002); Mémoires d'une Egypte perdue (Editions les Deux Terres 2009; Tadi Damagimda Kalan Ülke: Misir (Oğlak Yayınları 2000); Mein Kairo (Scherz 2002); Abrikozen langs de Nijl (Uitgeverij Sirene 2003); Sárgabarackok a Níluson (Ulpius-Ház 2004)

Cookbooks

- Vegetables: Growing, Cooking, Keeping, with Marianne Melendez (Viking Studio Books, 1991)
- New Kosher Cooking (Arbor House, 1986)
- Colette's Japanese Cuisine (Kodansha America 1985), introduced by Calvin Trillin
- Colette's Slim Cuisine (William Morrow 1983)
- A Mostly French Food Processor Cookbook (William Morrow 1983) with Jill Harris Herman
- Colette Rossant's After Five Gourmet (Random House 1981)
- Cooking with Colette, edited by Lorraine Davis (Scribners 1975)

Translations

- Best of New York, by Gault Millau (Prentice Hall, 1988 and 1990)
- Bocuse a la Carte by Paul Bocuse (Pantheon Books 1987)
- New Classic Cuisine by Michel Roux and Albert Roux (MacDonald 1983)
- Paul Bocuse's French Cooking, by Paul Bocuse (Pantheon Books 1977)

== See also ==
- James Rossant
- Eddy Palacci
- Pallache family
