= Coulonges-les-Sablons =

- Part of Sablons-sur-Huisne
- Location of Coulonges-les-Sablons
- Location within France Location within Normandy
- Coordinates: 48°24′11″N 0°54′00″E
- Country: France
- Region: Normandy
- Department: Orne
- Arrondissement: Mortagne-au-Perche
- Canton: Bretoncelles
- Commune: Sablons-sur-Huisne
- Area^{1}: 19.57 km^{2} (7.56 sq mi)
- Elevation: 140 m (460 ft)
- Highest elevation: 264 m (866 ft)
- Lowest elevation: 133 m (436 ft)
- Population (2022): 389
  - Density: 19.9/km^{2} (51.5/sq mi)
- Time zone: UTC+01:00 (CET)
  - Summer (DST): UTC+02:00 (CEST)
- Postal code: 61110
- Website: mairie.coulonges.free.fr
- ^{1} French Land Register data, which excludes lakes, ponds, glaciers > 1 km^{2} (0.386 sq mi or 247 acres) and river estuaries.

Coulonges-les-Sablons (French pronunciation: [kulɔ̃ʒ le sablɔ̃]) is a former commune in the Orne department in north-western France. On 1 January 2016, it was merged into the new commune of Sablons-sur-Huisne.

== See also ==
- Communes of the Orne department
