= James Rossant =

American architect (1928–2009)

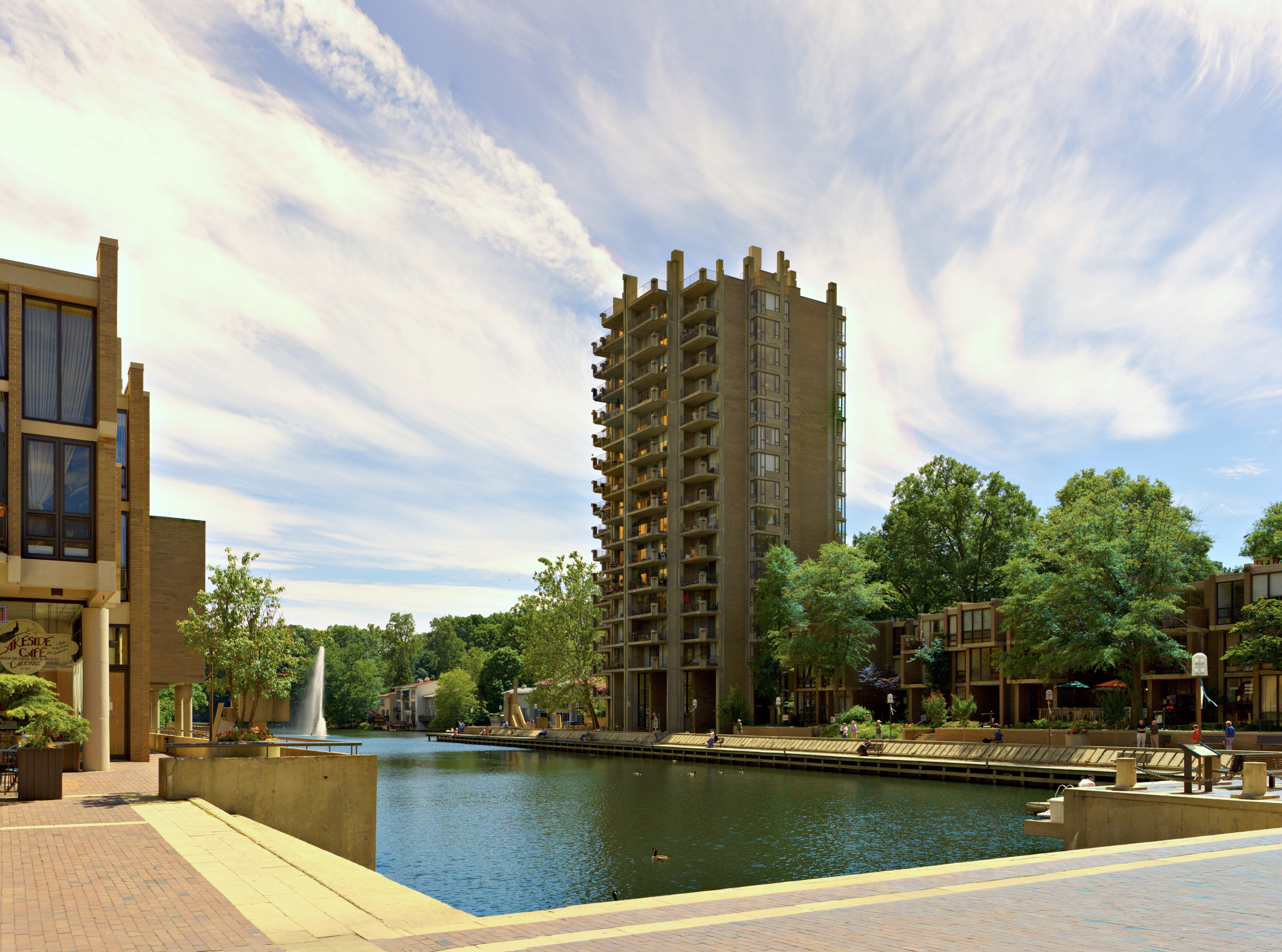
- Lake Anne in Reston, Virginia, US
- Born: James Stephan Rossant; August 17, 1928; New York City, U.S.
- Died: December 15, 2009 (aged 81); Germonville, Condeau, Orne, France
- Education: Harvard Graduate School of Design
- Occupation: Architect
- Spouse: Colette Palacci (m. 1955)
- Children: 4
- Practice: Mayer & Whittlesey
- Buildings: Butterfield House, Ramaz School, Two Charles Center
- Projects: Myriad Botanical Gardens, U.S. Navy Memorial
- Design: Reston, Virginia, Lower Manhattan, Dodoma
- Website: jamesrossant.com

James Stephan Rossant (August 17, 1928 – December 15, 2009) was an American architect, artist, and professor of architecture. A long-time Fellow of the American Institute of Architects, he is best known for his master plan of Reston, Virginia, the Lower Manhattan Plan, and the UN-sponsored master plan for Dodoma, Tanzania. He was a partner of the architectural firm Conklin & Rossant and principal of James Rossant Architects.

== Early life ==
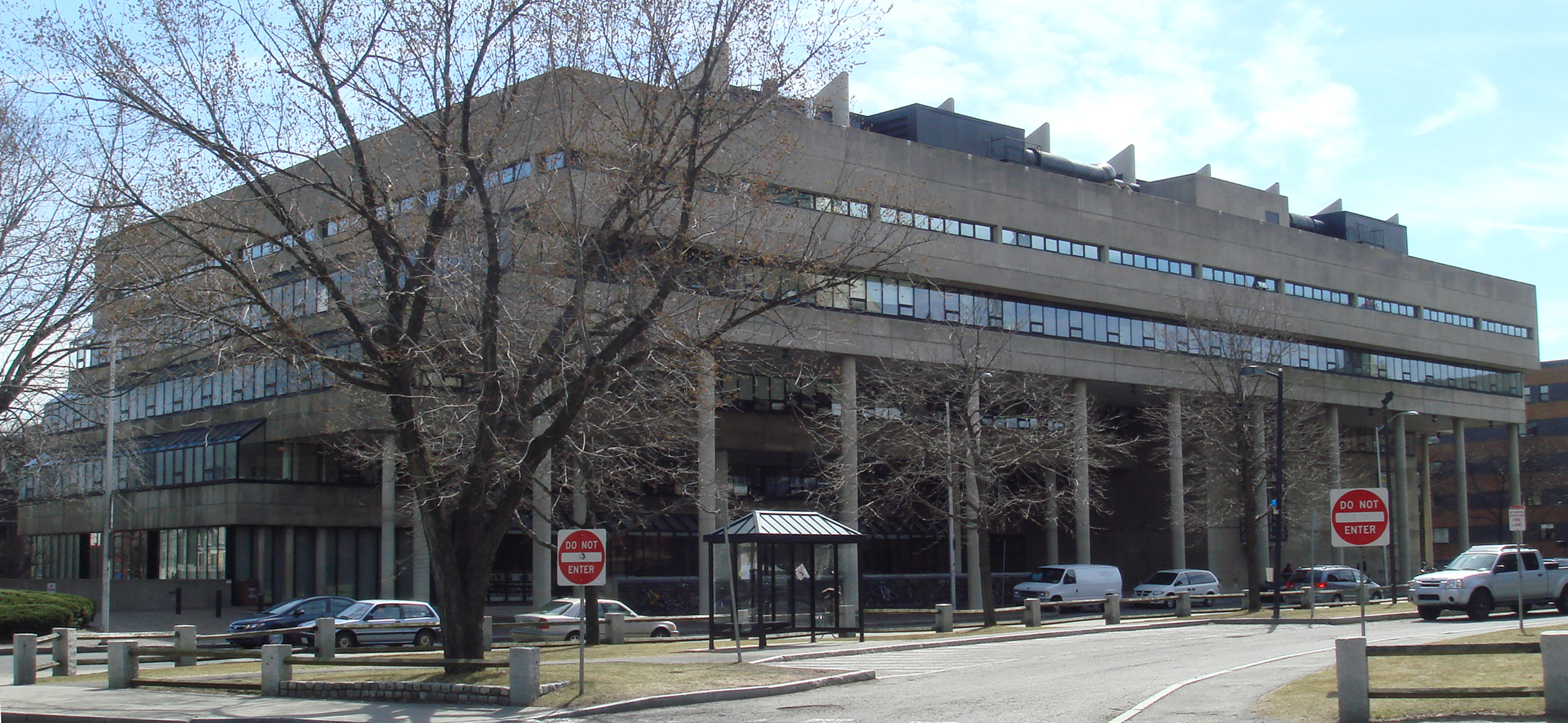
Gund Hall, home of Harvard GSD, where Rossant studied architecture under Walter Gropius and others

Born in New York City, Rossant grew up in the Bronx, where he attended the Bronx High School of Science. Rossant's brother was journalist Murray Rossant. He studied architecture at Columbia University, the University of Florida, and Harvard University's Graduate School of Design (under Walter Gropius).

== Career ==
=== Architecture ===
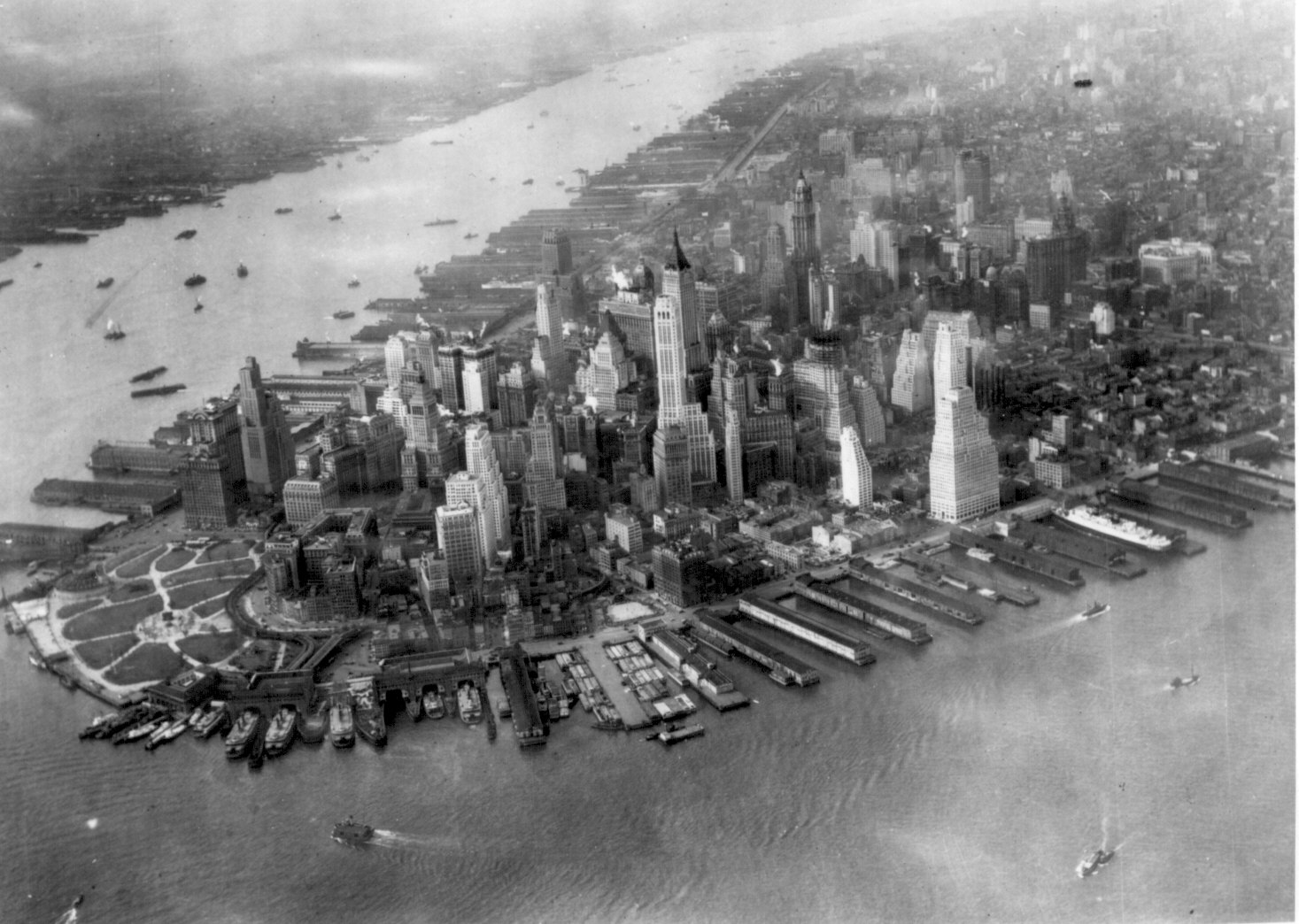
Lower Manhattan pictured (1931), which Rossant and others made new master urban plans in the 1960s

After the war, he worked in Italy with Gino Valle (designer of the Cifra 3 clock). In 1957, Rossant joined Mayer & Whittlesey as architect and town planner. His first large design project was the Butterfield House apartment house in Greenwich Village (1962). He also worked on the Lower Manhattan Plan. For Whittlesey & Conklin, he developed the master plan for Reston, Virginia.

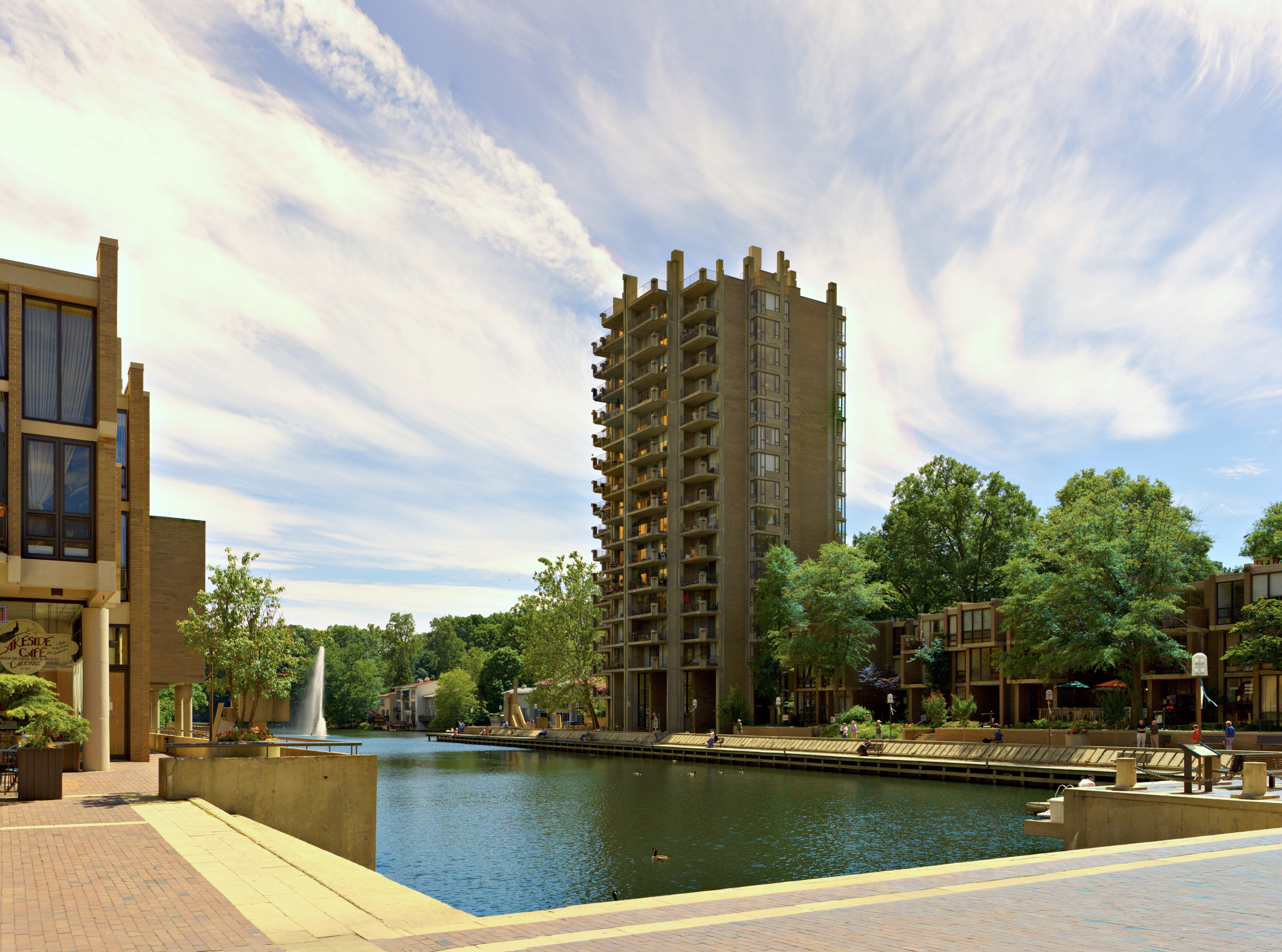
Lake Anne Plaza in Reston, designed by James Rossant and William Conklin

For Conklin & Rossant, his work included the Crystal Bridge of the Myriad Botanical Gardens (Oklahoma City), the Ramaz School (New York City), Two Charles Center (Baltimore), and the U.S. Navy Memorial at Market Square (Washington, DC).

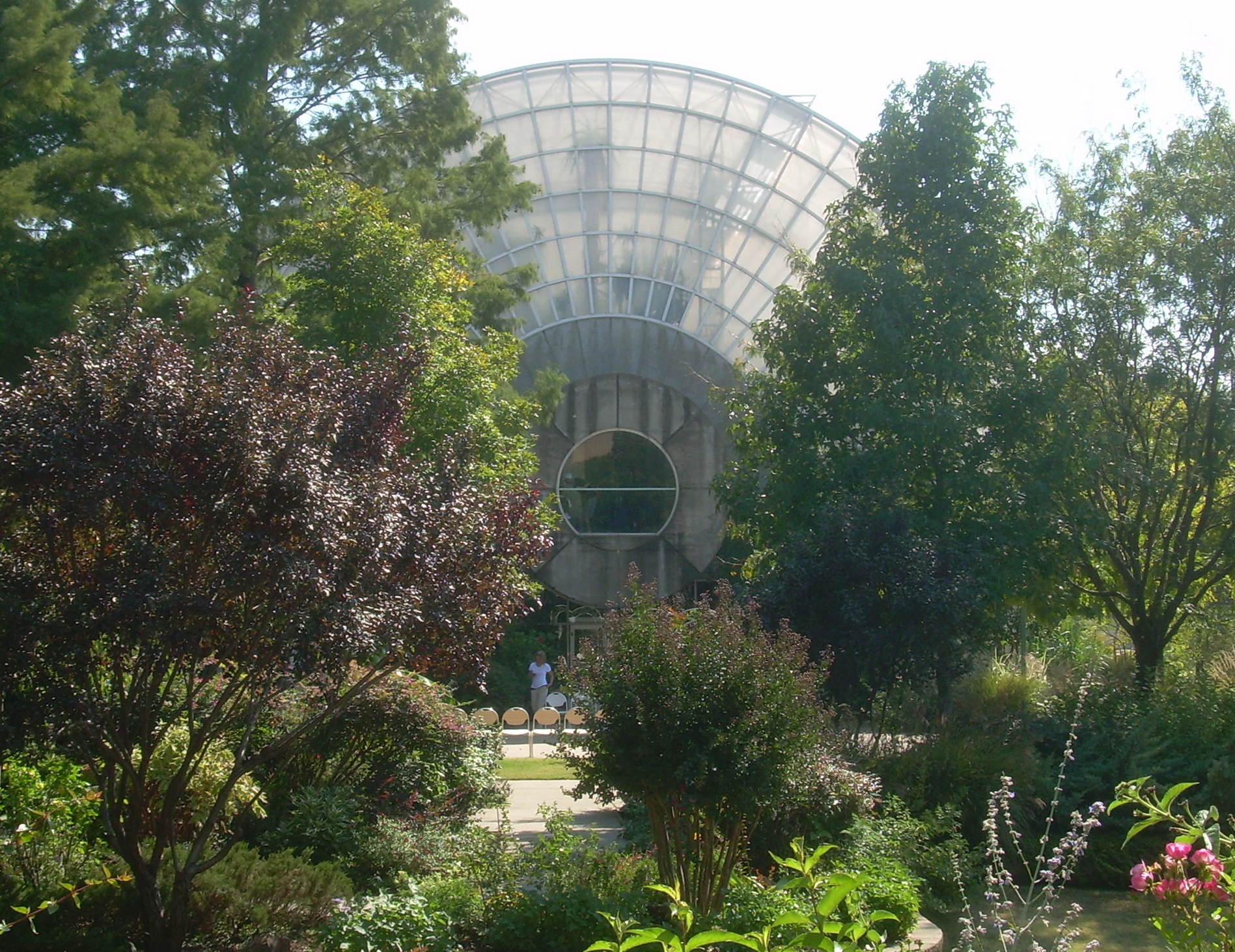
Crystal Bridge Tropical Conservatory at the Myriad Botanical Gardens in Oklahoma City, designed by Rossant and Conklin

For 3R Architects, his work included Tanzania's new capital at Dodoma under the sponsorship of the United Nations. He served on New York City's Public Design Commission (formerly the Art Commission of the City of New York). On November 2, 1971, Rossant appeared with Ada Louise Huxtable on the television show Firing Line on discuss "Why Aren't Good Buildings Being Built?" He appeared posthumously from television clips and his wife in interviews as part of Rebekah Wingert-Jabi's 2015 documentary Another Way of Living: The Story of Reston, VA.

=== Artwork ===
Rossant painted all his life and exhibited frequently (last in Paris, 2009). His sculpture includes work publicly accessible on Washington Plaza along Lake Anne in Reston. He published Cities in the Sky in 2009, based on one of his longest series of architectural paintings. He also illustrated several cookbooks by his wife.

=== Teaching ===
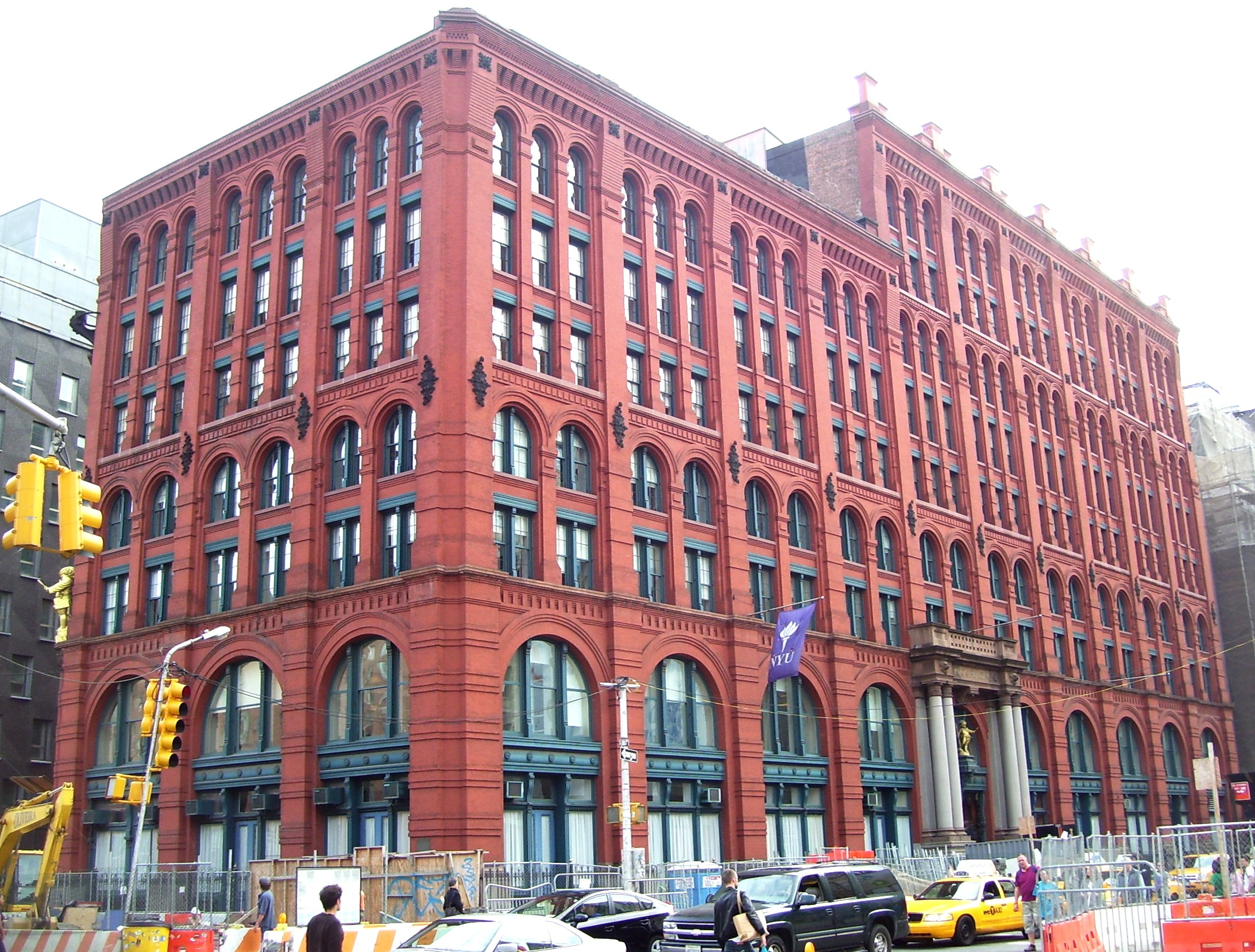
Puck building of the Pratt Institute, where Rossant taught for many years

Rossant taught architecture at the Pratt Institute (1970–2005) and Urban Design at New York University's School of Public Administration (1975–1983). As lecturer, he visited the National University of Singapore, the American University of Beirut, Harvard University, the University of Virginia, and Columbia University.

== Personal life and death ==
Rossant married Colette Palacci while serving in the army in Europe; the couple moved back the US in the mid-1950s. The couple had four children.

He died at Germonville, Condeau, in the Orne portion of Le Perche, Lower Normandy, from complications of chronic lymphocytic leukemia (CLL). Rossant was survived by his wife Colette Rossant (food critic, cookbook author, memoirist); children Marianne (educator), Juliette (author and journalist), Cecile (author and architect), and Tomas (architect); and eight grandchildren.

== Works ==
James Rossant wrote a memoir which he published privately and shared with members of his family.

Writings:

- Willis, Carol, ed. (2002). Lower Manhattan Plan: The 1966 vision for downtown New York: Essays by Ann Buttenwieser, Paul Willen, and James Rossant. New York: Princeton Architectural Press. LCCN 2002010899.
- Rossant, James (August 6, 2009). Cities in the Sky. San Francisco: Blurb.
- Articles (various)

Drawings:

- Rossant, Colette (1975). Cooking with Colette, with drawings by James Rossant. New York: Scribner. LCCN 75016113.
- Rossant, Colette (1983). Colette's Slim Cuisine, with drawings by James S. Rossant. New York: Morrow. LCCN 83000992.
- Owen Nichols; Clara Syme, eds. (2026). Architectural Image-Making in 1980s New York: The John Nichols Printmakers & Publishers Collection. A83 and Spector Books.

== See also ==
- Reston
- Dodoma
- Walter Gropius
- Rossant (surname)
- Colette Rossant
