= List of works by Robert A.M. Stern =

This list of works by Robert A. M. Stern categorizes the architect's work. Stern has established an extremely prolific career in the span of six decades, and has designed some of the tallest buildings in New York City and the United States. He has also contributed extensively to college campuses across the country, having designed buildings on the campuses of Georgetown University, Johns Hopkins University, and every Ivy League school except Cornell.

== Notable architectural projects ==
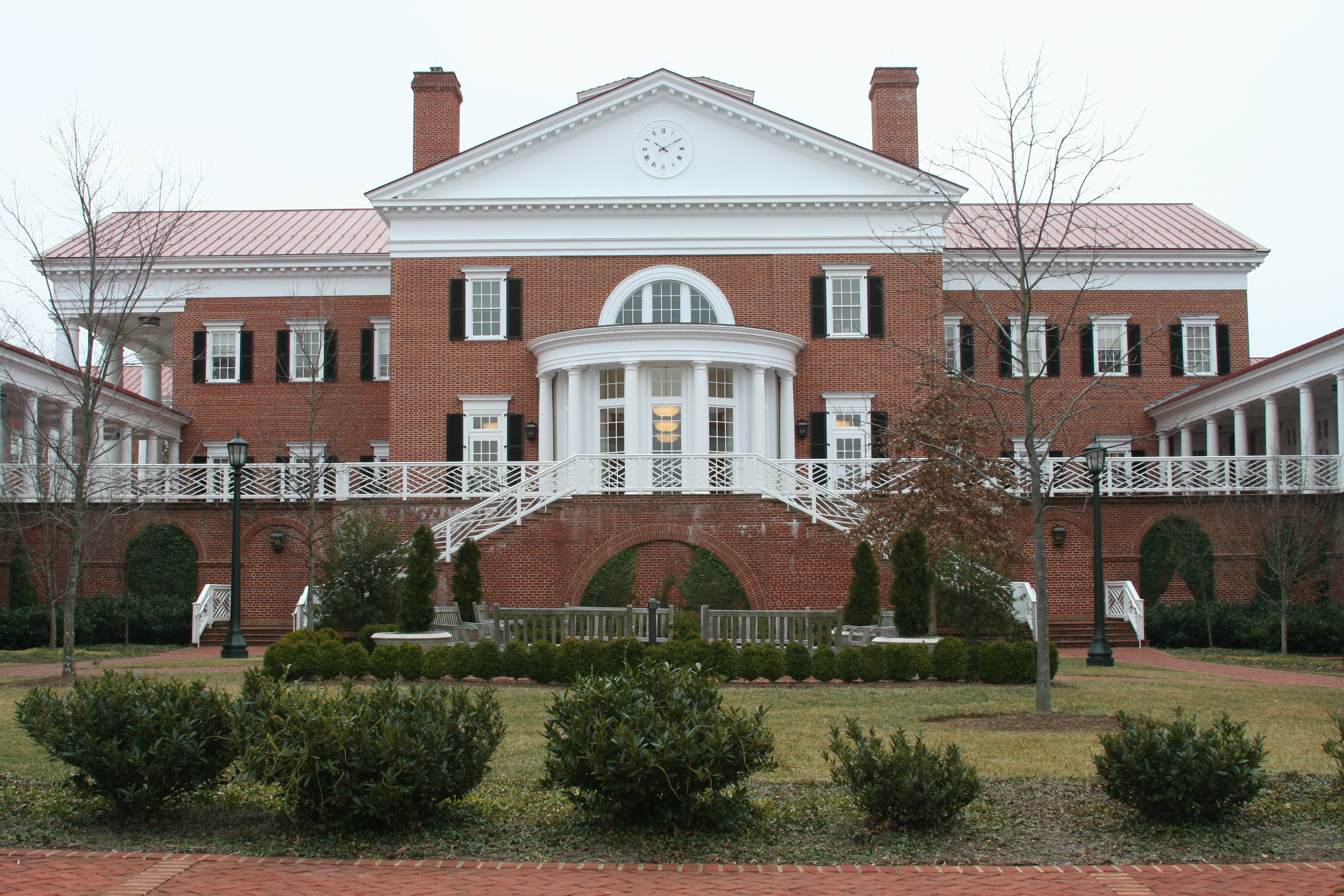
Darden School of Business

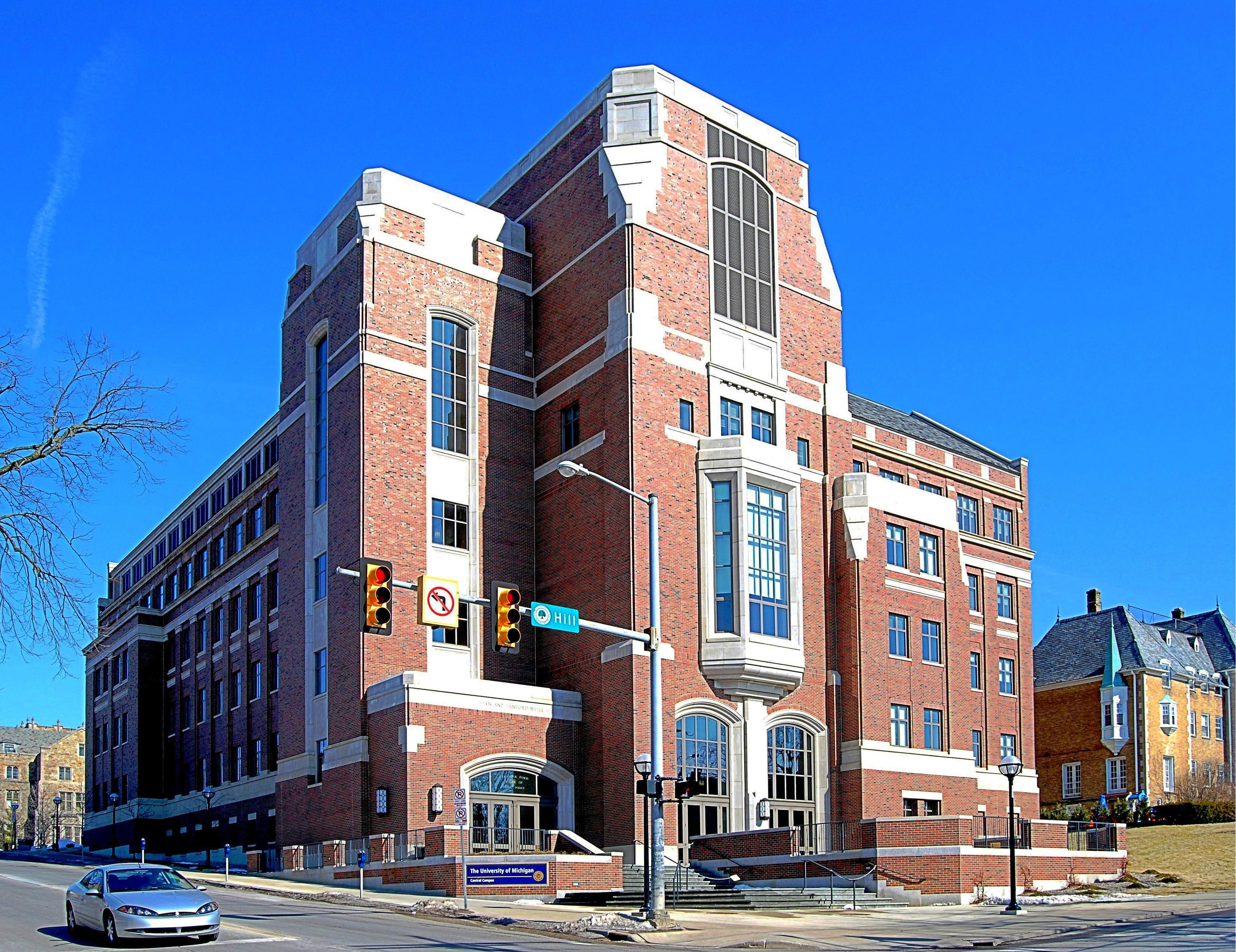
Gerald R. Ford School of Public Policy

Major projects of Robert Stern and his architecture firm RAMSA include:

- 1993: Norman Rockwell Museum
- 1996: Darden School of Business at the University of Virginia
- 1999: Smith Campus Center – Pomona College
- 2001: Federal Reserve Bank of Atlanta – Atlanta, Georgia
- 2001: Nashville Public Library – Nashville, Tennessee
- 2005: Jacksonville Public Library - Jacksonville, Florida
- 2006: Gerald R. Ford School of Public Policy at the University of Michigan
- 2007: Ocean Course Club House – Kiawah Island
- 2007: Superior Ink – New York City
- 2008: 15 Central Park West – New York City
- 2008: Comcast Center – Philadelphia, Pennsylvania
- 2008: Mandarin Oriental, Atlanta – Atlanta
- 2008: One St. Thomas Residences - Toronto, Canada
- 2008: Lakewood Public Library - Lakewood, Ohio
- 2009: Alan B. Miller Hall at the College of William and Mary
- 2010: Tour Carpe Diem – La Défense, Paris
- 2012: Aquatics and Fitness Center at Brown University, Providence, Rhode Island
- 2013: George W. Bush Presidential Library – Southern Methodist University in Dallas, Texas
- 2015: Immanuel Chapel at Virginia Theological Seminary – Alexandria, Virginia
- 2016: Four Seasons Hotel New York Downtown, hotel/residence tower developed by Larry Silverstein near his rebuilt World Trade Center complex.
- 2017: Two residential colleges at Yale University near Ingalls Rink
- 2017: Harvard Kennedy School campus transformation project including the Batia and Idan Ofer Building, the Leslie H. Wexner Building, and the expansion of the David M. Rubenstein Building, Cambridge, Massachusetts
- 2019: 1331 Maryland Ave SW, Washington, D.C., apartments near the 14th Street Bridge
- 2019: Colony Hall, adjacent to the Paul Mellon Arts Center at Choate Rosemary Hall

== Current architectural projects ==
As of August 2015, Stern and his office RAMSA lead the following projects:

- 1601 Vine Street – built in conjunction with the Mormon Temple in Philadelphia
- 220 Central Park South, skyscraper – Manhattan, New York City
- 30 Park Place, skyscraper – Manhattan, New York City
- One Bennett Park, skyscraper – Chicago, IL
- 520 Park Avenue, skyscraper – Manhattan, New York City
- Audley Square House, apartment/townhouse complex – London
- Museum of the American Revolution – design for the museum, opened in 2017
- 20 East End Avenue, condominium – Manhattan, New York City
- Camden Waterfront – Camden, New Jersey
- 70 Vestry, condominium – Manhattan, New York City

== See also ==
- New Classical architecture
