= Edmund Hollander =

American landscape architect (b. 1954)

- Born: September 3, 1954 (age 72)
- Occupation: Landscape Architect
- Organization: Hollander Design Landscape Architects
- Spouse: Wendy Powers

Edmund David Hollander (born September 3, 1954) is an American landscape architect and educator. A New York City native, he is the president of Hollander Design Landscape Architects, a New York-based firm known for environmental planning, landscape design and horticulture. The firm provides services to residential, commercial and civic clients.

According to Hollander, the cornerstone of his practice is his theory of the "Three Ecologies": Ecology of site, Human Ecology, and the Ecology of Architecture. In the introduction to his book, The Good Garden, Hollander opined: “A powerful landscape unfolds like a story. Your land is your home and within your home is the house."

Hollander has taught at the Graduate School of Fine Arts at the University of Pennsylvania and at City College of New York.

== Life and career development ==
=== Early years and education ===
Edmund Hollander was born on September 3, 1954, in New York City and grew up on Manhattan 's Lower East Side. His mother, Jean Kopelman, was a New York television producer and his father, Alvin L. Hollander Jr., was an executive at WCAU-TV in Philadelphia. He attended Vassar College from 1972 to 1976 and received a bachelor's degree in history and botany, then studied ecology and horticulture for three years at the New York Botanical Gardens School of Professional Horticulture. In 1983 he earned in his master's degree in landscape architecture with a focus on ecology from the University of Pennsylvania.

=== Design Influences ===
At Penn, he studied with Ian McHarg, the Glasgow-born urban planner and ecologist, whose book Design with Nature revolutionized the way landscape architects can shape the land. McHarg taught his students to look at each site as a cross-section of layers: topography, soils, geology, climate. In the studio, they practiced his “layer cake” technique of overlapping transparent sheets of Mylar, each with a schematic of hydrology, soil, and areas of forest, marshland or fragile dunes.

Other masters of design who taught at Penn, including Arthur Edwin Bye and Laurie Olin, challenged the Penn graduate students to consider every aspect of how people live in a particular place and to think about design holistically considering a site's cultural history and its place in the community, along with the site's built elements.

=== Personal ===
Hollander was married to Wendy Powers on June 20, 1992, at the Piping Rock Beach Club; the couple has a daughter, Renata. They own Freddy, a rescued schnoodle. They live in Sag Harbor and New York City.

== Career ==
After graduating from Penn, Hollander first worked at the Delta Group in Philadelphia, then was recruited by the firm of Clarke & Rapuano in New York City. There he worked on commissions such as the Westway Waterfront Park on Manhattan's West Side and a new ecologically based corporate headquarters for Merck Pharmaceuticals. Simultaneously, he was developing his residential design practice with Penn classmate Maryanne Connelly.

=== Hollander Design Landscape Architects ===
In 1991 Hollander founded Hollander Design Landscape Architects with Connelly. Hollander Design has offices in New York, Chicago and Sag Harbor, N.Y., and a staff of 25 environmental planners, landscape architects and horticulturists. The firm has created hundreds of landscapes, both public and private, around the world, and usually manages about 30 projects at any one time. The company's portfolio concentrates on the greater New York area including a number of summer homes on Long Island's East End as well as a roster of New York City urban multi-family dwellings.

=== Design approach ===
Hollander believes each landscape can be analyzed by studying its three ecologies: The site's natural ecology, including topography, soil and climate; the architectural ecology of the house as it will appear in the future, along with related structures; and its human ecology, meaning the many ways in which people will use the property. “The three ecologies essential to a timeless project,” he explained to Architectural Digest, “are the architectural ecology of the buildings, the natural ecology of the vernacular landscape, and the human ecology of how the clients will inhabit the landscapes we create.” He consults with the architect involved in designing a new home or remodeling an existing structures, as well as the homeowner and family, "envisioning their lifestyle and finding out what’s already there that they love." When designing a landscape, Hollander focuses on what plants and trees are appropriate for the land, favoring native species and those that will survive in the existing soils. However, he also knows that landscaping are living things, and plans for those changes to come. Hollander, writes J. Michael Welton in Ocean Home magazine, "views his profession's commitment to every landscape as akin to the Hippocratic Oath: First, do no harm. He seeks to work with the natural ecology of a site, the human ecology of his client and the architectural ecology of the building."

=== Teaching career ===
Hollander has taught at the City College of New York and in the Graduate School of Fine Arts at the University of Pennsylvania, where he serves on the Dean's Council and has frequently lectured.

=== Professional associations ===
- Member and past president of the New York Chapter of the American Society of Landscape Architects.
- Member of the American Society of Landscape Architects; elected as an ASLA Fellow in 2009.
- Serves on the Dean's Council of the Graduate School of Fine Arts at the University of Pennsylvania and the advisory board of the Ian L. McHarg Center for Urbanism and Ecology at Penn.

== Notable projects ==
=== Public, non-profit or government ===
==== Washington, D.C. ====
- John F. Kennedy Center for the Performing Arts, Washington, D.C.: The Reach - Hollander's firm has redesigned "landscaped paths, outdoor seating, gathering places, dining options, and an outdoor stage and a video wall" as part of a 61,000-square-foot expansion on 4.6 acres immediately south of the original 1971 structure. The redesigned landscape complements new pavilions that were dedicated in September 2019. The landscape now features a grove of 35 ginkgo biloba trees planted to honor President Kennedy, as well as curved areas planted with "sedum, a succulent grass sturdy enough to grow vertically when the curvature of the landscape calls for it." Hollander's firm and the project architect, Steven Holl Architects, worked to harmonize the original modernist building, designed by Edward Durell Stone, with its surroundings, to make the center more accessible to the public, and to deaden the noise from nearby motorways.
- The Parks at Walter Reed, located on the grounds of the former Walter Reed Army Medical Center, courtyard project - pro bono project for HELP USA.

==== California ====
- The Huntington Library, Art Collections, and Botanical Gardens, San Marino, CA.

=== Commercial ===
==== New Jersey ====
- Merck & Company, Inc. former corporate headquarters, Whitehouse Station section of Readington, N.J., where Hollander and Connolly saved many trees before construction of the new headquarters building, which included a two-deck underground garage to preserver more of the natural landscape, began. Merck also encouraged Hollander's team to convert the 460-acre property into an "ecological laboratory," featuring native plants and elimination of lawns. Merck & Co. sold the entire property to UNICOM Corporation, a division of UNICOM Global, in 2018.
- Institute for Advanced Study, Princeton, completed in 2016.

==== New York ====
- 111 Murray, Tribeca, New York, NY.
- Loews Regency Hotel, 540 Park Avenue & 61st Street, New York City, NY.
- Superior Ink, a factory building located in the West Village neighborhood of Manhattan, N.Y., converted into luxury residential condominiums and townhouses.

=== Residential ===
- Maycroft, a private residence in North Haven, N.Y., is a 136-year-old country house located on a 43-acre lot on which Hollander worked to save existing native plants; part of that effort was to move the existing house and turn it 260 degrees so it better fit with the existing flora.
- Villa Maria, a private residence in Water Mill, N.Y., is a one-time convent and spiritual center. The new private owners hired Hollander Design to redesign the grounds to better blend with the home.

== Awards and honors ==
=== American Society of Landscape Architects, Honor Award ===
- 2017 – Abstracting Morphology, New York State
- 2015 – Flying Point, Southampton, N.Y.
- 2006 – Dune Side Residence, East Hampton, N.Y.

=== Illinois Chapter, American Institute of Architects, Honor Award ===
- 2018 – Dune House, Long Island, NY.

=== Maryland Chapter, American Institute of Architects, Honor Award ===
- 2017 – Sagamore Pendry Hotel, Baltimore, MD.

=== New York Chapter, American Society of Landscape Architects ===
==== Honor Award ====
- 2019 – Dune House, Topping Farm
- 2017 – Abstracting Morphology
- 2016 – Surfside, Under the Wind
- 2013 – Meadowmere Place, Long Island, NY; Summer Cottage, Long island, NY
- 2012 – Briar Patch, City Courtyard, Dune House
- 2008 – Haven Meadows
- 2005 – A Farm Re-Interpreted

==== Merit Award ====
- 2018 – Verde Moderne
- 2015 – Flying Point
- 2013 – On the Bluff, The Camp
- 2012 – Hornbeam Cottage
- 2011 – Indian Wells Residence
- 2009 – Rolling Meadows
- 2007 – Dune Side Residence, Tupelo Grove
- 2006 – Burley

==== Excellence in Design Award ====
- 2005 – Victorian Estate Conversion, Weekend Retreat

=== The Institute of Classical Architecture and Art, Stanford White Award ===
- 2017 – English Country House
- 2012 – Forest Retreat

=== New York School of Interior Design ===
- 2015 – Thomas N. Armstrong III Award in Landscape Design

=== Architizer A+ Award ===
- 2017 – Abstracting Morphology

=== Architectural Digest magazine ===
- AD 100 – 2016, 2017, 2018

=== The Architectural Masterprize ===
- 2019 - Architecture MasterPrize (Formerly AAP Architecture Prize), Winner in Landscape Architecture / Residential for Dune House

=== Luxe RED Award ===
- 2019 - Regional Winner, Landscape Design/Outdoor Living, unnamed Long Island, N.Y. residence

== Charitable work ==
Hollander and Hollander Design have provided services pro bono to numerous projects and causes.

He is a member of the board of trustees of the New York Restoration Project (NYRP), which was founded Bette Midler and is New York City's only citywide conservancy planting trees and restoring parks for residents in all five boroughs. He serves on the board's real estate and development committees and has provided landscape design services for many NYRP projects.

He has volunteered his services to a number of restoration projects in Sag Harbor, N.Y., which prompted the Sag Harbor Partnership to award him in 2017 its Annual Community Service Award. These activities include:

- The St. David A.M.E. Zion Church Cemetery in Eastville, where he helped rehabilitate the cemetery's landscape.
- The Oakland Cemetery, where he helped organize "a volunteer effort to rehabilitate" the cemetery by removing dead brush and pruning many trees that threatened to harm historic monuments and endanger visitors.
- The Sag Harbor Whaling Museum, for which he developed conceptual plans for a new landscaping plan.
- The Sag Harbor Cinema Arts Center, serving on the board of the not-for-profit guiding the efforts to restore the original Sag Harbor Cinema and expand it to become a regional arts center.
- The restoration of the town harbor, the John Steinbeck Waterfront Park.

== Publications ==
=== Books ===
- The Good Garden: The Landscape Architecture of Edmund Hollander Design by Edmund Hollander and Anne Raver (The Monacelli Press, June 2015)
- The Private Oasis: The Landscape Architecture of Edmund Hollander Design by Philip Langdon (June 2012)
- Gardens for the New Country Place: The Landscape Architecture of Ed Hollander and Maryanne Connelly by Paul Bennett, Photography by Betsy Pinover Schiff (September 2003)
