= Bennett Park =

Bennett Park may refer to:

- Bennett Park (Chicago), city park in Chicago
- Bennett Park (Detroit), baseball park for the Detroit Tigers that formerly existed in Detroit, Michigan
- Bennett Park (New York City), city park in New York City
