= One Bennett Park =

Skyscraper in Chicago, Illinois

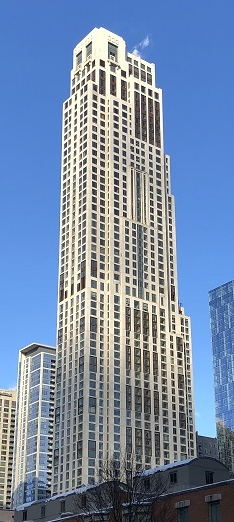
- As seen in January 2019
- Interactive map of the One Bennett Park area
- Alternative names: 451 E. Grand Ave.

General information
- Status: Completed
- Type: Residential
- Location: River East, Streeterville, Chicago, Illinois
- Coordinates: 41.891573°N 87.615620°W
- Management: Related Midwest

Height
- Roof: 843 feet (257 m)

Technical details
- Floor count: 69
- Floor area: 786,191 sq ft (73,039.5 m^{2})

Design and construction
- Architect: Robert A.M. Stern Architects
- Structural engineer: Thornton Tomasetti
- Main contractor: Lendlease

Website
- www.onebennettpark.com

One Bennett Park is a skyscraper at 451 East Grand Avenue, in the Streeterville neighborhood of Chicago. The project was first announced as the building at 451 E. Grand Ave. in July 2014, approved in December 2014, and named One Bennett Park in October 2015. Both the building and the adjacent park are named for Edward H. Bennett, the Chicago architect and urban planner who coauthored the 1909 Plan of Chicago. The building topped-out in late 2018, and later opened in the spring of 2019. It is among Chicago's tallest skyscrapers.

== History and location ==
The building was approved in December 2014, the same month Streeterville Organization of Active Residents approved the building.

The tower is located in the River East community of the Streeterville neighborhood, directly adjacent to Bennett Park and a half-block from North Lake Shore Drive. Site prep began for One Bennett Park in early 2016.

== Design ==
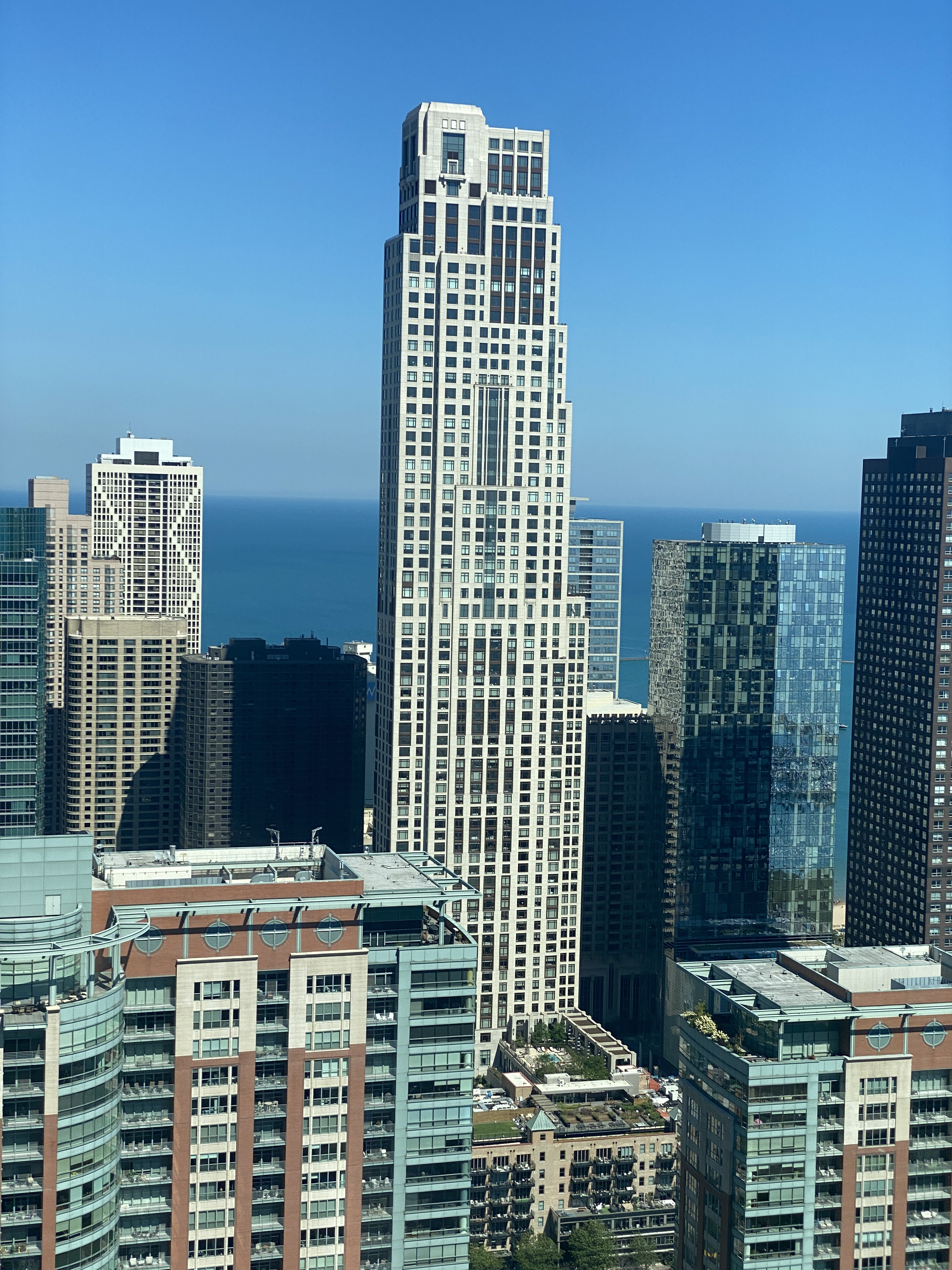
One Bennett Park from St. Regis Chicago, 2022

The building was designed by Robert A.M. Stern Architects who have designed similar buildings, such as 15 Central Park West, 30 Park Place, and 220 Central Park South. It will reach 843 feet at its architectural height and total 69 stories, making it the 12th tallest building in Chicago. The tower will also be overseen by GREC Architects as the Architect of Record. Consultants include Thornton Tomasetti as the structural engineer and WMA Consulting Engineers LLC as the MEP/FP Engineer and the sustainability consultant.

The building has been favorably compared to buildings in New York City. It will be his second project in Chicago; previously, he created the plans for the JCDecaux bus shelters. 451 E. Grand Avenue will be built with a limestone base, while the rest of the building will be precast concrete, similar to many of Stern's buildings elsewhere. However, the concrete will be colored and textured to resemble other buildings in the Streeterville area and adhere to the neo-deco and neo-Gothic styles prevalent in Chicago. The interiors, including much of the lobby and common spaces, will be designed by Robert A.M. Stern Interiors.

The top two floors will be dedicated to a mechanical penthouse designed to mirror lantern towers and other unique cornices of Chicago skyscrapers. The 68th floor will also house a tuned mass damper. Due to the tower's narrow profile, the mass damper is intended to decrease the lateral sway from wind at high altitudes and remove any motion discomfort to condominium and penthouse owners near the top. While mass dampers are often large, solid masses whose movements are controlled by hydraulic pistons, the damper in One Bennett Park will be a slosh tank damper, using a large tank of water to absorb and alleviate stress from lateral motion.

== Amenities and usage ==
451 E. Grand Avenue will feature a new 1.7-acre park by Michael Van Valkenburgh & Associates that is accessible to both residents of the new tower and of the surrounding River East neighborhood. In addition to a deck on the 44th floor, the tower will also feature green roofs on eight levels.

Occupancy for the tower will include 279 apartments and 69 condominiums, with a total parking capacity of 900 parking spots for the units. While 400 of these parking spots will be reserved for residents, a majority will be available to the residents and visitors of the surrounding area, as well as the general public. The parking itself inhabits 4 stories of subterranean levels directly below the public park and tower. This contrasts to the more common model of the River East area. As can be seen in such buildings as the Trump International Hotel and Tower and even the Hancock Center, parking is usually placed within the lower levels of the building itself, usually above a ground-level retail floor.

== Sustainability ==
Like many new skyscrapers in Chicago, the tower will be LEED certified for sustainability, and is currently attempting the level of LEED Silver certification. Because of this, the tower will feature several sustainable strategies, such as water-efficient toilets, sinks, and showers in both public and residential areas. Overall energy usage will be optimized with the exploitation of natural ventilation. While Chicago city code mandates that residential units have operable windows, One Bennett Park will locate common areas (such as living/dining/kitchen and bedrooms) of residential units within 25 feet or less of an operable window, allowing for maximum cross ventilation and decreasing the need for mechanical ventilation.

Large amounts of vegetated open space as well as public hardscape areas made of semi-reflective materials will help to decrease the urban heat island effect while providing ample outdoor areas for residents' physical and mental health. Vegetated roof areas, such as on the large amenity deck, will also help decrease the heat island effect, as well as shrink the building's carbon footprint.

The tower will also feature low-emitting and low- or zero-VOC materials on the interior, including paints and interior coatings. At least 20% of raw materials, such as structural concrete and steel, drywall, masonry, and insulation, will be sourced regionally (within 500 miles of the project site). At least 10% of the materials will be recycled. This strategy aims to decrease pollution caused by transportation of materials over long distances as well as toxins released during raw material production (as opposed to recycling and reusing materials).

== See also ==
- Robert A.M. Stern Architects
- List of works by Robert A.M. Stern
- List of tallest buildings in Chicago
- List of tallest buildings in the United States
