= Gennady Perepada =

Ukrainian-American real estate agent

- Геннадий Перепада
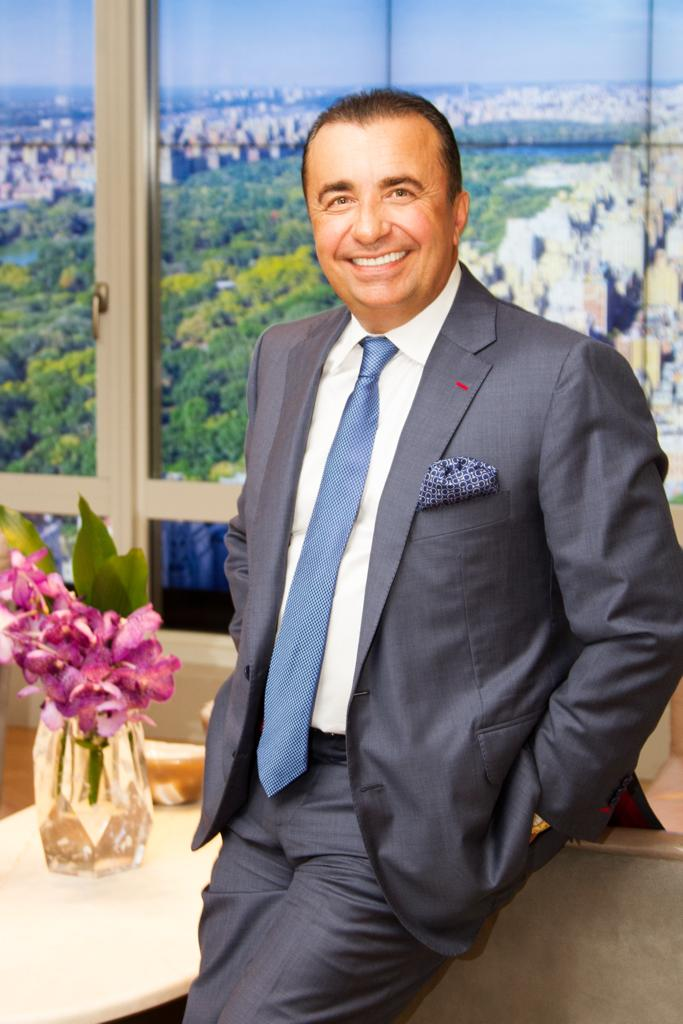
- Occupation: Real estate broker

Gennady Perepada (Note: Ukrainian: Геннадий Перепада, romanized: Hennadyi Perepada) is President of One and Only Realty, Inc., a New York City based real estate brokerage firm. He is best known for selling real estate to high-net worth foreign clients, including sales at 432 Park Avenue, 520 Park Avenue, 15 Central Park West, and other properties throughout North America. According to Forbes, the countries his clients emanate from include the former Soviet Union, Asia, Saudi Arabia, Hong Kong and China.

Perepada grew up in Ukraine and started off as an ice cream chef in the Soviet Union. He emigrated to New York in 1990, and learned to speak English while living in the United States.
