= Chawne Kimber =

African-American mathematician and quilter

- Born: 1971 (age 54–55); Frankfort, Kentucky
- Title: Dean of the College

Academic background
- Education: University of Florida
- Doctoral advisor: Jorge Martinez

Academic work
- Discipline: Mathematics
- Institutions: Washington and Lee University; Lafayette College; Wesleyan University

Chawne Monique Kimber (/ʃɔːn/ SHAWN; born 1971) is an African-American mathematician and quilter, known for expressing her political activism in her quilts. After working as a professor and head of mathematics at Lafayette College, and as Dean of the College at Washington and Lee University, she was named as vice president for academic affairs and dean of faculty at Pitzer College in 2025.

== Education and career ==
Kimber, a native of Frankfort, Kentucky, comes from a family of cotton farmers and quilters in Alabama. Although she writes that she "always loved math", she began her undergraduate studies at the University of Florida by studying engineering before switching to mathematics because she found it more fulfilling. She earned a master's degree at the University of North Carolina in 1995, as a student of Idris Assani. She returned to the University of Florida for doctoral studies, completing her Ph.D. in 1999. Her dissertation, Prime Ideals in Rings of Continuous Functions, connects abstract algebra with functional analysis and was supervised by Jorge Martinez.

After a term as Van Vleck Visiting Assistant Professor of Mathematics at Wesleyan University, she joined Lafayette College as an assistant professor. In mathematics, she is known for incorporating concepts of social justice into her classroom teaching. She was a Professor and then head of the Math Department. In 2008, she along with Professor Sharon Jones began the Summer Program to Advance Leadership in STEM at Lafayette. This six-week program where incoming students take college level writing and calculus address along with modules in STEM. Students are those who are identified as leaders from groups typically underrepresented in STEM fields. In 2018, Kimber was one of six recipients of the prestigious Clare Booth Luce Scholarship to attend the HERS (Higher Education Resource Services) Institute. While head of the Math Department, the department "worked to promote an inclusive culture based on the understanding that math is a gateway to many other fields in the sciences, technology and engineering".

In May 2021, Washington and Lee University announced that Kimber would become the school's Dean of the College effective July 1, 2021. She is responsible "for 21 departments and 13 interdisciplinary programs. The dean serves as chair of the Committee on Courses and Degrees and belongs to the Faculty Executive Committee. The dean reports to the provost and serves on the Provost's Academic Council as well as the President's Council".

== Quilting ==
still not (2019) at the Renwick Gallery in 2022

Kimber grew up with her great-grandmother's quilts and her father considered these "quilts his most prized possessions". Kimber began quilting in 2005, soon after completing her application for tenure at Lafayette, and her interest in quilting was renewed in 2007 by the death of her father. Her quilts are influenced by her great-grandmother's work which "used the same patchwork style as those associated with Gee's Bend" – Kimber views her work as a "contemporary adaptation" of that style. In 2008 she began creating highly politicized quilts and blogging about them, beginning with a series of quilts inspired by George Carlin's seven dirty words and by racist and sexist graffiti on her college campus. Her work has been associated with the "modern Quilting" movement, based on its geometric design and provocative content. Her work includes varied subject matter that raise social issues including the killing of African Americans and sexual assault. As well as quilting, Kimber has also exhibited quilting-inspired works of mathematical origami.

Kimber's quilts are frequently included at quilting shows and museum exhibits of quilting. The Paul Mellon Arts Center put up a show of her works in 2018. One of her quilts inspired by the death of Eric Garner won first place at QuiltCon West in 2016, and was included with other pieces by Kimber in a show on "Quilts and Human Rights" at the Pick Museum of Anthropology at Northern Illinois University. Her work, still not, was acquired by the Smithsonian American Art Museum as part of the Renwick Gallery's 50th Anniversary Campaign. This exhibition highlighted that the piece's fabrics were "sourced from mid-century textiles". The description stated that "Kimber's choice to use vintage cloth and improvisational patterns draws on her memories and family history. Many of her enslaved ancestors in rural Alabama cultivated and ginned cotton. Her great-grandmother, Mamo, and other relatives expressed themselves through quilting. [...] Mamo's story was told through her quilts, and Kimber continues the thread".

Elizabeth Landau, for The Washington Post in 2020, commented that Kimber "tries to keep her math and quilting worlds separate. Some of her quilts deliberately rebel against the patterns and orderly structures that dominate math. They are — like jazz music played with fabrics and stitches — improvisational. But the thread of challenging systemic inequalities runs through both of Kimber's endeavors. [...] Against the backdrop of persistent social injustices, Kimber's quilts are both timely and timeless".
