= 220 Central Park South =

Residential skyscraper in Manhattan, New York

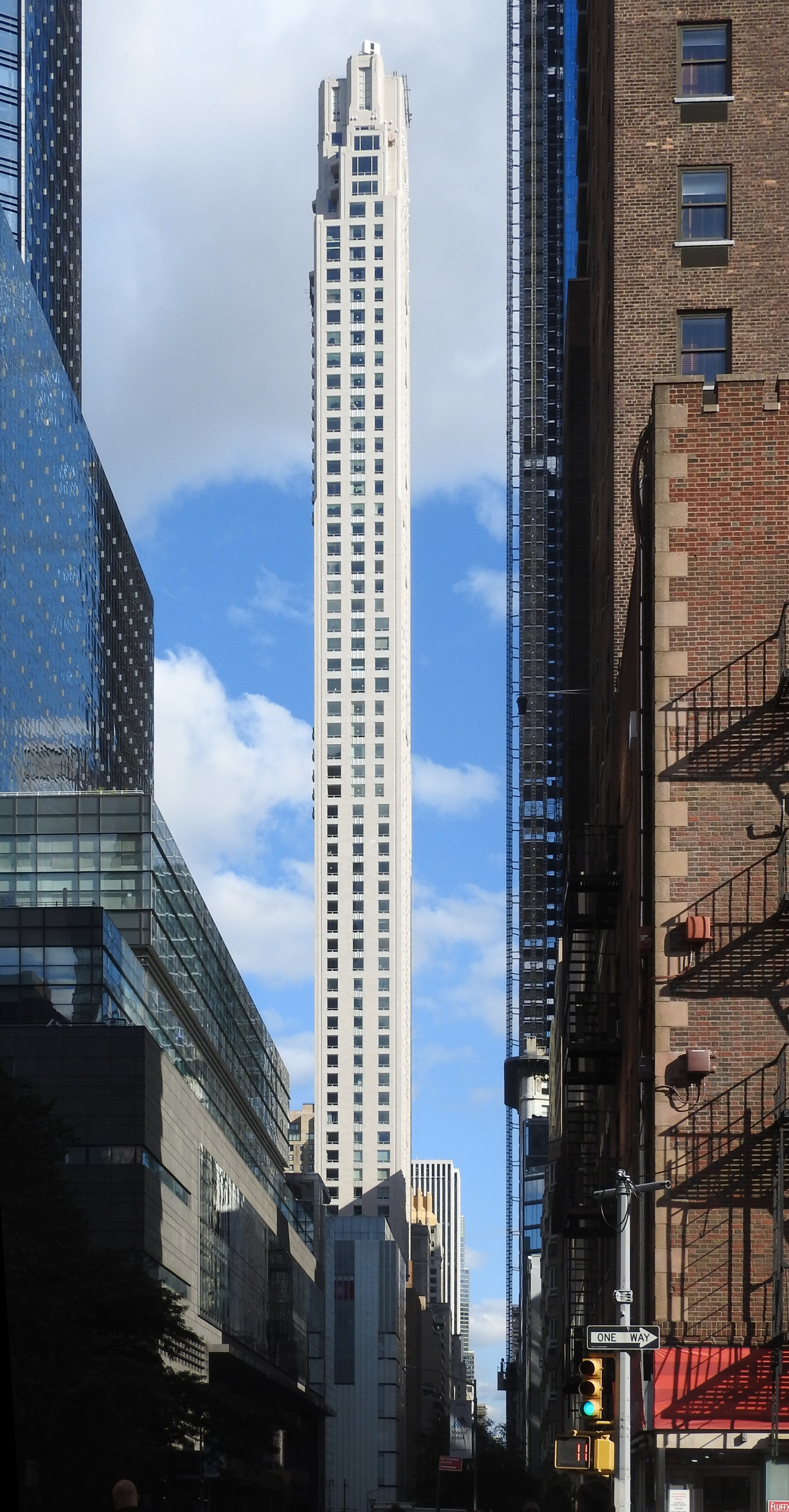
- Seen from Ninth Avenue in 2019
- Interactive map of the 220 Central Park South area

General information
- Status: Completed
- Architectural style: New Classical
- Location: 220 Central Park South, New York City, United States
- Coordinates: 40°46′01″N 73°58′51″W
- Groundbreaking: 2013
- Completed: 2019
- Opened: 2018
- Cost: $1.4 billion
- Owner: Vornado Realty Trust

Height
- Architectural: 950 feet (290 m)

Technical details
- Floor count: 70

Design and construction
- Architects: Robert A.M. Stern Architects & Thierry Despont; SLCE Architects (architect of record)
- Structural engineer: DeSimone Consulting Engineers

Website
- Official website

220 Central Park South is a residential skyscraper in Midtown Manhattan in New York City, situated along Billionaires' Row on the south side of Central Park South between Broadway and Seventh Avenue. 220 Central Park South was designed by Robert A.M. Stern Architects and SLCE Architects, with interiors designed by Thierry Despont. It is composed of two sections: a 70-story, 950-foot (290 m) tower on 58th Street, which is the 21st-tallest building in New York City, and an 18-story section on Central Park South, both of which contain a limestone facade. Most of the 118 apartments are duplex apartments, although some of the units have been combined to create larger units. The building has a porte-cochère, a wine cellar, private dining rooms, and various recreational facilities.

Vornado Realty Trust developed the building on the site of a rent-stabilized apartment complex constructed in 1954 and acquired in 2005; a lawsuit from the building's tenants delayed the demolition of the existing structure to 2012. Vornado also had to settle a dispute with Extell, which owned a garage on the site and had expressed concern that Vornado's structure would block northward views of Extell's adjacent Central Park Tower. Robert A. M. Stern's designs were released in early 2014, and the plans were approved that March. Work on the base started in 2015 and most exterior work was done by the time the first residents moved into the building in 2018.

220 Central Park South contains some of the most expensive apartments in New York City, with a secretive purchasing process and many anonymous buyers. Two of the building's units have sold for over $100 million, including a $238 million unit purchased by billionaire hedge fund manager Kenneth C. Griffin in 2019, the most expensive home ever sold in the United States at the time.

== Site ==
220 Central Park South is in the Midtown Manhattan neighborhood of New York City, just east of Columbus Circle and south of Central Park. It has frontage on 58th Street to the south and Central Park South to the north, in the middle of a city block bounded by Seventh Avenue to the east and Broadway to the west. The building carries the alternate addresses of 225-231 West 58th Street. The building sits on an L-shaped site covering four land lots: three on West 58th Street measuring a combined 10,030 square feet (932 m^{2}), and a fourth lot between Central Park South and 58th Street measuring 17,578 square feet (1,633.0 m^{2}). The site has frontage of 200 feet (61 m) along 58th Street and 75 feet (23 m) along Central Park South, with the Central Park South wing on the far eastern portion of the site.

Nearby buildings on the same block include Gainsborough Studios and 240 Central Park South to the west, as well as 200 Central Park South, the Helen Miller Gould Stable, and the firehouse of Engine Company 23 to the east. 220 Central Park South is across from the Central Park Tower, the American Fine Arts Society (also known as the Art Students League of New York building), the Saint Thomas Choir School, and the Osborne Apartments to the south. The building is close to two New York City Subway stations: the 57th Street–Seventh Avenue station of the N, Q, R, and W trains, and the 59th Street–Columbus Circle station of the 1, A, B, C, and D trains. 220 Central Park South is one of several major developments around 57th Street and Central Park that are collectively dubbed Billionaires' Row by the media. Other buildings along Billionaires' Row include 432 Park Avenue five blocks southeast, 111 West 57th Street and One57 one block southeast, and the adjacent Central Park Tower. Prior to the construction of the current building, the site was occupied by a 20-story cooperative apartment house completed in 1954.

== Architecture ==
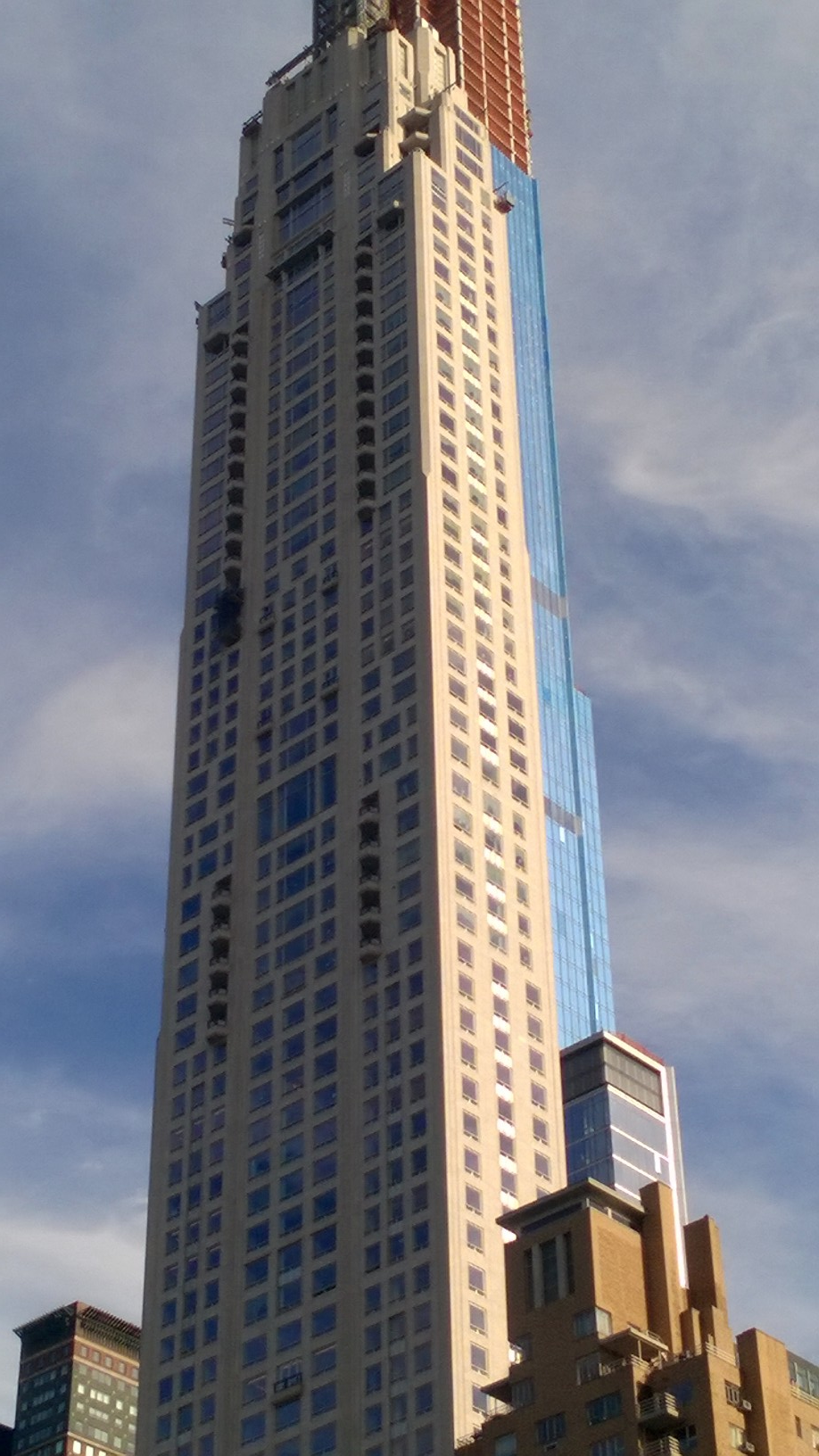
Seen from northwest

Robert A.M. Stern Architects designed the massing and exterior of 220 Central Park South, and SLCE Architects was the architect of record. The building is one of several skyscrapers designed by Stern in Manhattan, which include 15 Central Park West, a few blocks to the north; 30 Park Place in the Financial District; and 520 Park Avenue, east of Central Park. Thierry Despont designed the interior spaces. Other firms involved in construction included structural engineer DeSimone Consulting Engineers and general contractor Lendlease.

=== Form and facade ===
The structure is composed of two sections: a 70-story tower on 58th Street and a shorter 18-story section on Central Park South. The massing of the building is influenced by the two zoning districts that the building occupies; different height restrictions were determined by the floor area ratios for each respective zoning district. One quarter of the site is on Central Park South, while the remaining three-quarters of the lot are on 58th Street. The two wings of 220 Central Park South abut a motor court with a porte-cochere, where vehicles could drop off and pick up residents and their guests. The porte-cochere is accessed by a pair of 20-foot-tall (6.1 m) gates.

The main structure, on 58th Street, is 952 feet (290 m) tall, rising 70 stories above the ground. The floor slabs of the upper floors measure 53 by 128 feet (16 by 39 m), with the longer dimension extending west to east, and each of the upper floors contains an area of about 7,500 square feet (700 m^{2}), giving the upper floors a slenderness ratio of 18:1. Due to its slenderness, the building has been characterized as part of a new breed of New York City "pencil towers". The upper floors rise above the southern section of the site, both because of the light restriction and because the position of the floor slabs would enable all the residential units to face north toward Central Park. During construction, three alternatives for the massing and twenty-three alternatives for the floor slabs were studied.

The base of the building includes a smaller section on Central Park South, called The Villas. This section is 18 stories tall, with a deep setback above the sixth floor and several smaller setbacks on upper floors. Portions of the Villas' facade contain metal balconies in front of the windows. According to Emporis, The Villas stands 274 feet (84 m) tall. Both sections of the building share a lobby and a three-story basement.

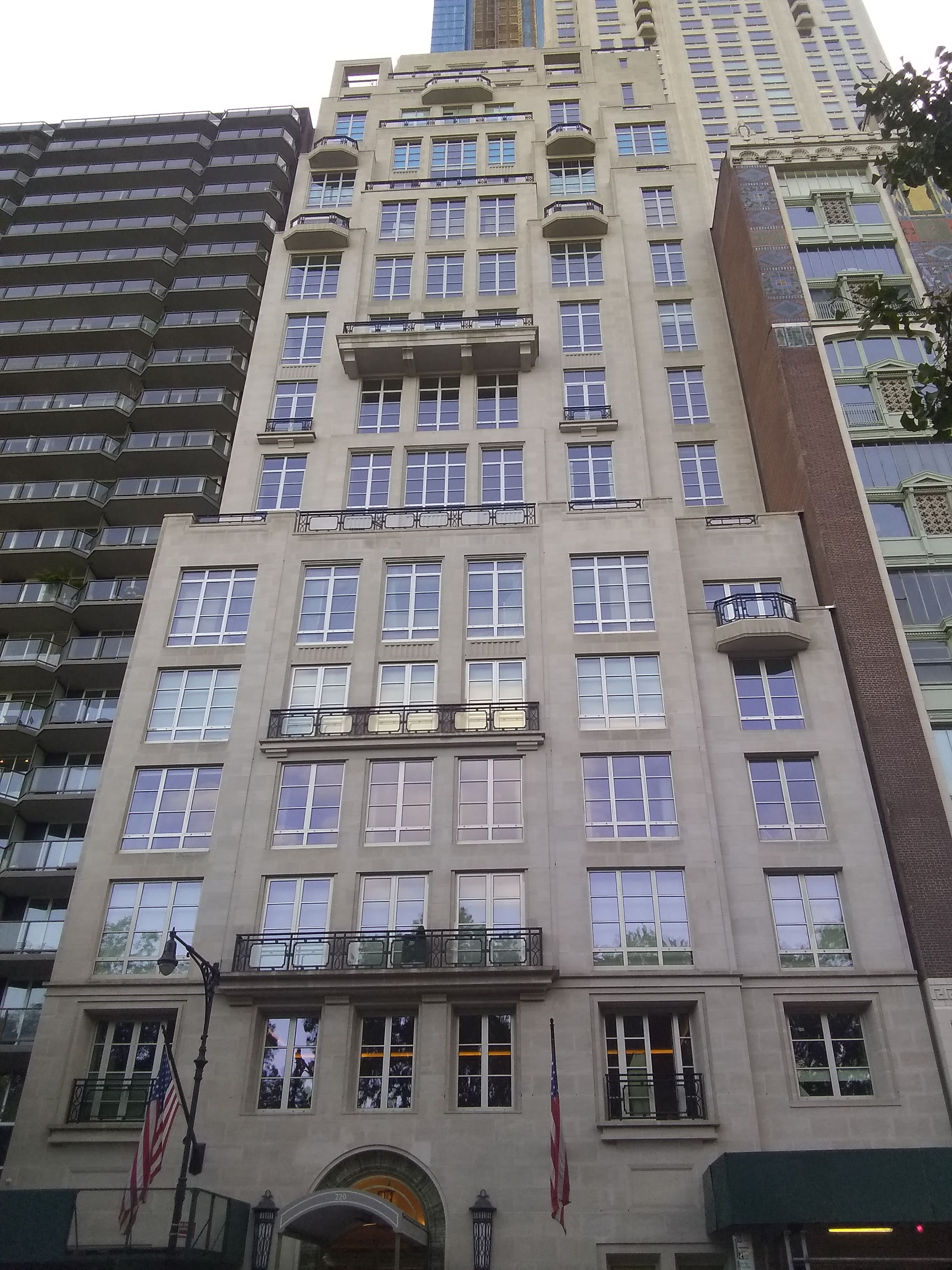
The facade on the Villas portion of 220 Central Park South

Both buildings have a limestone facade similar to other buildings by Stern, such as 15 Central Park West. 220 CPS's facade of Alabama Silver Shadow limestone has a "marbled" appearance (in contrast to 15 CPW's more uniform Indiana limestone). The usage of limestone was intended to blend with the more traditional facades of other buildings on Central Park's perimeter. According to Stern, 220 Central Park South's design was intended to make it "belong to the family of buildings that have framed Central Park for generations". Because of 220 Central Park South's height, it was infeasible to use hand-set or precast limestone sections, so the facade was instead designed as a curtain wall with window openings. The facade contains windows with detailed designs as well as a decorative rooftop crown. The Villa is also clad with the same Alabama limestone.

=== Structural features ===
220 Central Park South's foundation consists of three concrete mats, each measuring 8 feet (2.4 m) thick and collectively containing over 2,200 cubic yards (1,700 m^{3}) of concrete. The foundation mats sit on a layer of bedrock over 50 feet (15 m) deep, and 142 rock anchors were drilled into the bedrock and foundations to prevent overturning within the tower.

220 Central Park South's superstructure is concealed within its curtain walls. To maximize floor area, four large columns were installed along the northern side, a structural core on the southern side, and three smaller columns each on the western and eastern sides. This design was chosen over an alternative that would have placed several smaller columns on each side, but which was rejected because the developer did not want columns to be so closely spaced along the facade.

To maximize usable space on the upper floors, and thus maximize revenue from apartment sales, the mechanical equipment was placed at the base of the main tower on 58th Street. The mechanical equipment occupies six stories, each with ceiling heights of 18 to 24 feet (5.5 to 7.3 m), taking advantage of a zoning provision to maximize the tower's height. Accordingly, the mechanical equipment takes up 100 feet (30 m) of the tower's height, and the lowest condominiums in the main tower are 190 feet (58 m) above ground level. The roof of the main tower contains a slosh damper, which uses a huge tank of water to reduce vibrations. The damper weighs 1,100 short tons (980 long tons; 1,000 t).

=== Interior ===
The building's reception area has a round table, as well as a black-lacquered reception desk with a clock embedded into it. Leading off the reception area is a lounge with a fireplace and a Hiroshi Sugimoto painting depicting Anne of Cleves. Next to it is a library decorated in a mustard-and-scarlet color scheme, with another painting by Manolo Valdés. The second floor has a communal amenity suite with a double-height ceiling and a fireplace. This space has an 82-foot-long (25 m) saltwater swimming pool, private dining rooms, an athletic club, a juice bar, a library, a basketball court, a golf simulator, and a children's play area. A balcony overlooks the second-floor amenity suite, with a game room and screening room. Also on the second floor is a 54-seat restaurant for residents and their visitors, led by the chef Jean-Georges Vongerichten. The building also has a wine cellar.

There are 118 apartments, most of which are duplex apartments. The apartments contain features such as oak flooring, custom millwork, and marble cladding of the kitchen islands and restrooms. Sources disagree on how many apartments are within the Villas section of the building. According to 6sqft, the Villas contains 13 condominium units, while according to The New York Times, the Villas has 10 condos. The reporter Katherine Clarke wrote in 2023 that the Villas was home to 11 families.

Details of interior designs are scarce; The Wall Street Journal reported in late 2018 that the building's developer, Vornado, refused to publish renderings of apartment interiors. Some of the upper floors are designed so that they contain a single unit on each floor, or units spanning multiple floors. Some of the units have been combined to create larger penthouse or duplex apartments. For example, Vornado created a four-story "mega condo" by combining the 11,000-square-foot (1,000 m^{2}) duplex on the 50th and 51st floors with three units on the 52nd and 53rd floors. The top four stories of the Villas also comprise a single apartment with a spiral staircase connecting each floor.

== History ==
=== Planning ===
==== Acquisition of old building ====
The previous building at the address 220 Central Park South was a 20-story structure with either 120 or 125 apartments, constructed in 1954. It was developed by the J. H. Taylor Management Corporation and designed by Albert Mayer and Julian Whittlesey, all of whom had previously been involved with developing 240 Central Park South. The old 220 Central Park South had a concrete frame and white-brick framework, and consisted of two "towers" connected by a promenade and garden. Real estate investor Sarah Korein ultimately came to own the old 220 Central Park South, operating the building as a rent-stabilized development. After Korein died in 1998, her estate continued to operate the old building but did not maintain it well; among other things, its residents complained of rodent infestations and burst water pipes. The old 220 Central Park South was a nondescript building, and Robert A. M. Stern—who later designed the building's replacement and, separately, co-wrote the architecture book New York 2020—said its loss elicited "few tears".

In early 2005, Korein's estate placed the old building for sale. Because of the valuable air rights involved, one uninvolved broker estimated that the property would sell for as much as $160–175 million. At the time, the building had 47 tenants in rent-stabilized apartments, and 40% of the units were vacant. The Clarett Group was interested in purchasing the old 220 Central Park South, but did not have enough money to pay for the building up front. Warren Fink, the chief investment officer of the Clarett Group, contacted Vornado CEO Steven Roth and Vornado president Michael D. Fascitelli to join in the purchase. Vornado and Clarett eventually agreed to buy the building together, paying $131 million or $136.6 million for it in August 2005. Roth and Clarett CEO Veronica Hackett put up some of the equity for the purchase, while Fascitelli contributed the remainder. The developers intended to demolish the building and erect a 41-story glass tower, to be designed by Pelli Clarke Pelli.

Vornado served eviction notices to the old building's eighty tenants in 2006. Many of the remaining rent-stabilized tenants were elderly people without the means to easily relocate, and they refused to vacate, filing a lawsuit against Vornado. The residents also formed a tenants' association to fight the eviction. Although the New York Supreme Court initially ruled in favor of the tenants in 2008, determining that a proper environmental review had not been conducted, this was overturned upon appeal. The tenants hired David Rozenholc, a lawyer known for his advocacy in real-estate cases, to help them appeal, and he advised the tenants to prolong the appeal as much as possible. The developers ultimately settled with tenants in December 2010; they wanted to start construction quickly, as work on the competing One57 and 432 Park Avenue projects had already begun. All 26 remaining residents agreed to leave the building by early 2011, receiving up to $1.56 million apiece for their apartments. Following the 2008 financial crisis, Clarett lost nearly the entire premium that it had received, and Vornado bought out Clarett's stake in 2011, assuming total control of the project. Demolition of the existing structure began in 2012 and was completed in early 2013, and mosaic blocks from the old building were salvaged and placed into storage.

==== Garage dispute ====
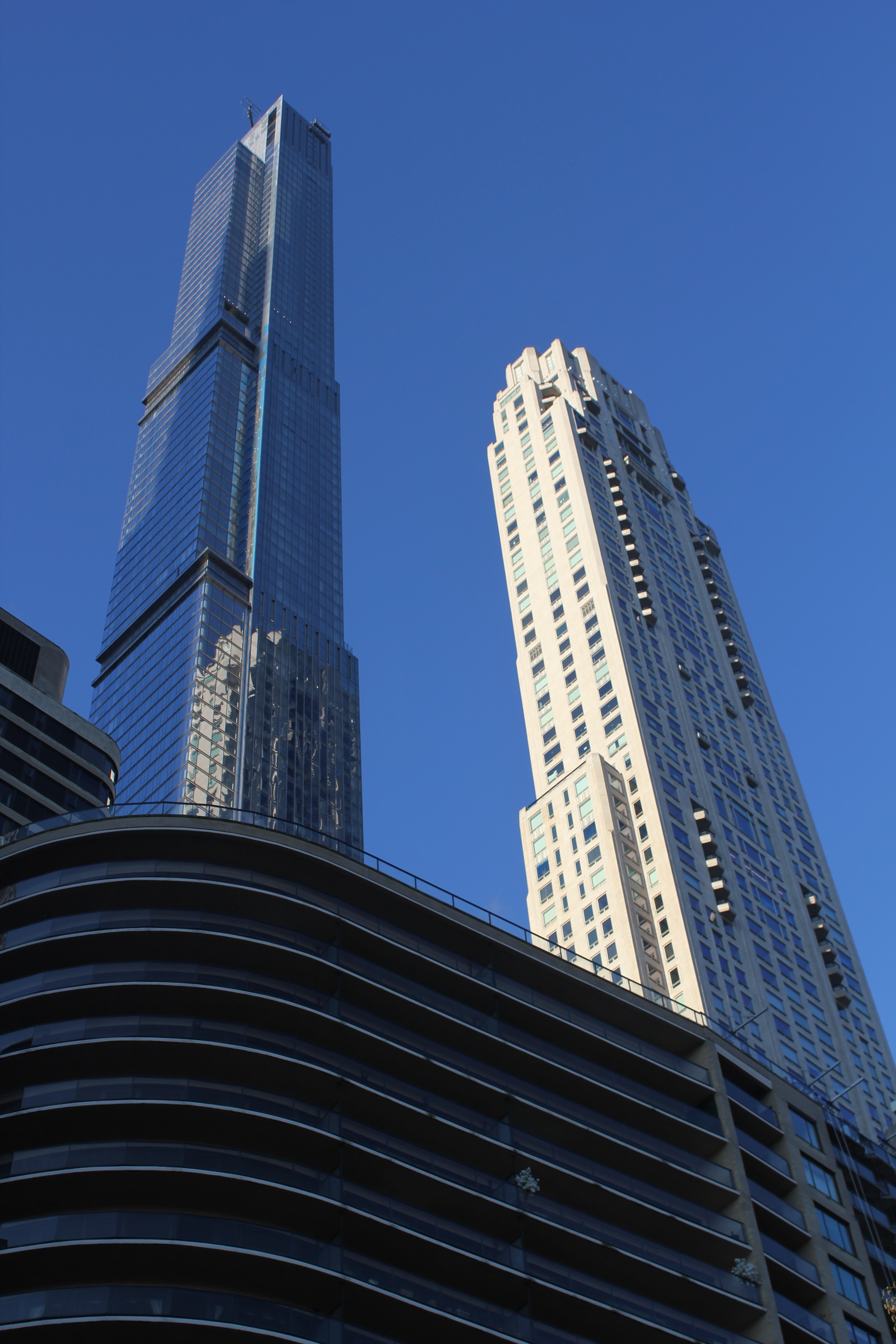
As part of a 2013 agreement, 220 Central Park South (right) was shifted slightly westward and Central Park Tower (left) was cantilevered slightly eastward.

By 2011, Vornado had acquired nearly all of the land, except the parking garage under part of the old building's site. Extell Development had leased the parking garage in 2006, and the lease did not expire until 2018. Extell's CEO, Gary Barnett, stated that he had leased the garage so that he would have enough parking for the Central Park Tower, which he was planning nearby. However, Extell repeatedly refused Vornado's attempts at a buyout or settlement. The dispute likely originated from the fact that Vornado's proposed building would block the views of Extell's proposed Central Park Tower development directly to the south, for which Extell had started acquiring land in 2005. Barnett had bought a 49% stake in the garage from its operators, the Rosenblatt brothers, and could thus refuse to move until the lease expired. Back in 2009, Barnett had also submitted plans to the New York City Department of Buildings (DOB) for an 18-story, 58-apartment building above the garage, which was now squeezed between two of Vornado's lots.

The DOB fined Extell in May 2012, after Vornado claimed that Extell had violated the terms of the lease. This violation was based on a technicality: The lease's certificate of occupancy said that the spots were "primarily for residents" of the rental building, but the structure was empty and about to be demolished. After the DOB issued the violation, Vornado alleged that Extell had defaulted on the lease by contravening the lease's terms. Extell then sued Vornado that August, claiming that Vornado had intentionally created the violation by first emptying the building of tenants. Extell was represented by Rozenholc, who claimed that the eviction was a ruse to clear the site for Vornado's new building; this ruse was later confirmed by The Real Deal magazine, which stated that Vornado had reported the lease violation to the DOB in 2011. Vornado served a second notice of default to the garage's operators in late 2012, claiming that the Rosenblatts had violated their lease by giving partial control to Extell.

While the court cases proceeded, Barnett had privately suggested to Roth the possibility of constructing an office building on Extell's 57th Street site, leaving Vornado's Central Park South site available for residential development. Publicly, neither developer was willing to cede to the other. A court enjoined the eviction in July 2013, permitting Extell to continue holding the garage. In October 2013, the two companies reached a settlement in which Vornado would give Extell $194 million for the garage and some air rights. As part of the deal, 220 Central Park South would be shifted slightly westward and Central Park Tower would be cantilevered slightly eastward, giving the latter a direct view of Central Park. Without Central Park Tower's cantilever, 220 Central Park South would have blocked the first 950 feet (290 m) of Central Park Tower. Vornado reported the total land cost for 220 Central Park South to be over $515.4 million, or $1,500 per square foot ($16,000/m^{2}). Including construction costs of $3,500 per square foot ($38,000/m^{2}), the building was estimated to cost $5,000 per square foot ($54,000/m^{2}). Because of this complicated agreement, Stern said the tower was "intimately tied" to the 21st-century development of 57th Street, despite not being located directly on that street.

=== Construction ===
==== Early progress ====
By the time work on 220 Central Park South started, several other ultra-luxury towers were already under construction nearby. There were concerns about the project's viability; The New York Times cited one skeptical broker as asking, "Are there enough billionaires to fill all these spaces?" Nonetheless, in early 2014, the Bank of China gave Vornado a $600 million loan for the building's construction. Roth eventually decided against developing a glass tower, as he believed that a more classically-styled limestone building would lure potential residents away from existing, masonry-clad cooperatives on Park Avenue and Fifth Avenue. He hired Stern to create updated designs for 220 Central Park South, having been impressed by Stern's earlier design of 15 Central Park West. The Zeckendorf family, which had previously hired Stern to 520 Park Avenue in the same style, were reportedly annoyed that 220 Central Park South's design was so similar to that of their own building. Roth hired Thierry Despont as the interior designer; at the time, Despont had designed few high-rise developments, being more well-known for his work on individual residences.

Stern's plans were approved by the New York City Department of Buildings. in March 2014. The plans called for 83 apartments to be built inside a 69-story, 950-foot-tall (290 m) tower at the site, and an additional 10 apartments in an adjoining 10-story "Villa". Site excavation was underway by May 2014. Lendlease was hired as the general contractor. The building was so close to the Central Park Tower that Lendlease (which was also working on the Central Park Tower) devised a system to prevent the two structures' construction cranes from colliding. Construction of the foundations involved manual hammering and controlled blasts to reduce damage to several nearby buildings, including some New York City designated landmarks.

==== Sales and completion ====
Sales began in early 2015; Roth was confident that the units would be sold quickly, despite lackluster sales at One57 nearby. As late as that April, there was little publicly-available information on the project, which was still planned to have 93 total apartments. By the next month, the building was proposed to contain 118 apartments, and construction had just progressed above ground level. About a third of the units were already in contract, representing a combined $1.1 billion, even though public sales had not yet started. The apartments yet unsold were priced at between $12.25 million and $100 million. The large amount of sales activity at the building increased Vornado's stock price greatly.

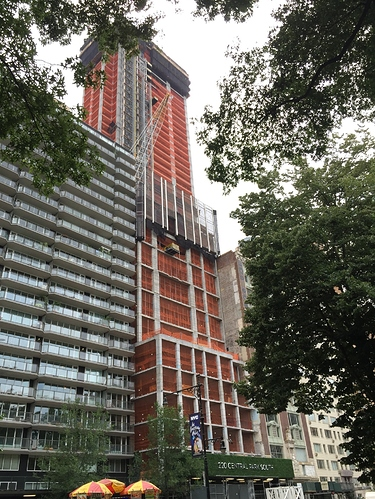
Under construction, seen from Central Park, July 2016

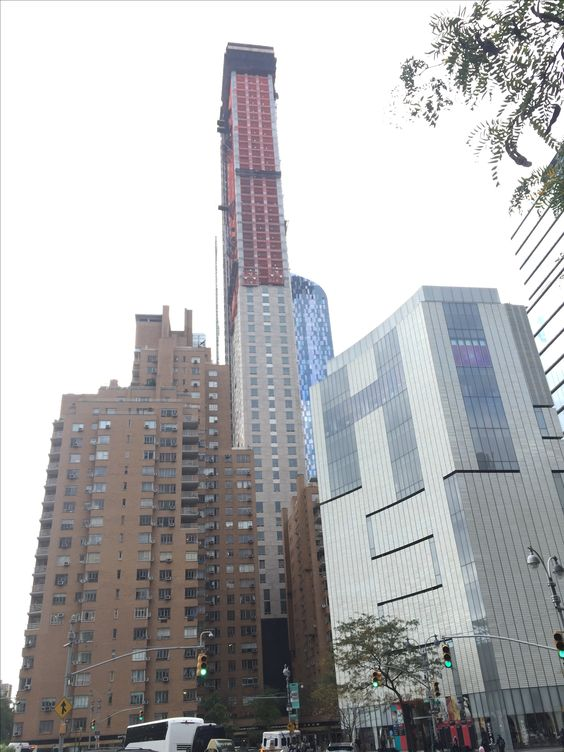
Under construction, seen from Columbus Circle, October 2016

In September 2015, Vornado increased its Bank of China loan by $350 million and terminated a commitment for a $500 million mezzanine loan. This loan came with an interest rate of 2%, much lower than the rates on loans obtained by the developers of other Billionaires' Row towers. Two months later, Vornado received an additional loan for the project, a $750 million unsecured term loan from multiple lenders. Half of 220 Central Park South's units were under contract by the end of the third quarter of 2015. To impress prospective residents, Roth hired his son Jordan's friend, fashion designer Zac Posen, to design uniforms for the building's staff. The base of the tower was under construction by late 2015. Aboveground work reached 15 stories in February 2016 and 25 stories by that May. In November 2016, Justin Casquejo, a thrill-seeking teenage free solo climber and stunt performer, hung from the not-yet-completed tower.

The construction process was generally secretive, and Roth did not host any press events for the building, nor did he invite reporters inside or reveal many of the design details. One construction worker was reportedly fired just for taking a picture of the building's interior. The real estate magazine The Real Deal reported in July 2018, "It has now been two years, eight months and 28 days since Vornado Realty Trust deigned to update Wall Street on sales at 220 Central Park South." According to Roth, the lack of updates was an intentional move for "competitive reasons". Brokers and lawyers uncovered floor plans and proposed prices by reviewing an offering plan filed with the Attorney General of New York, while reporters filed Freedom of Information Act requests to recover data from the offering plan.

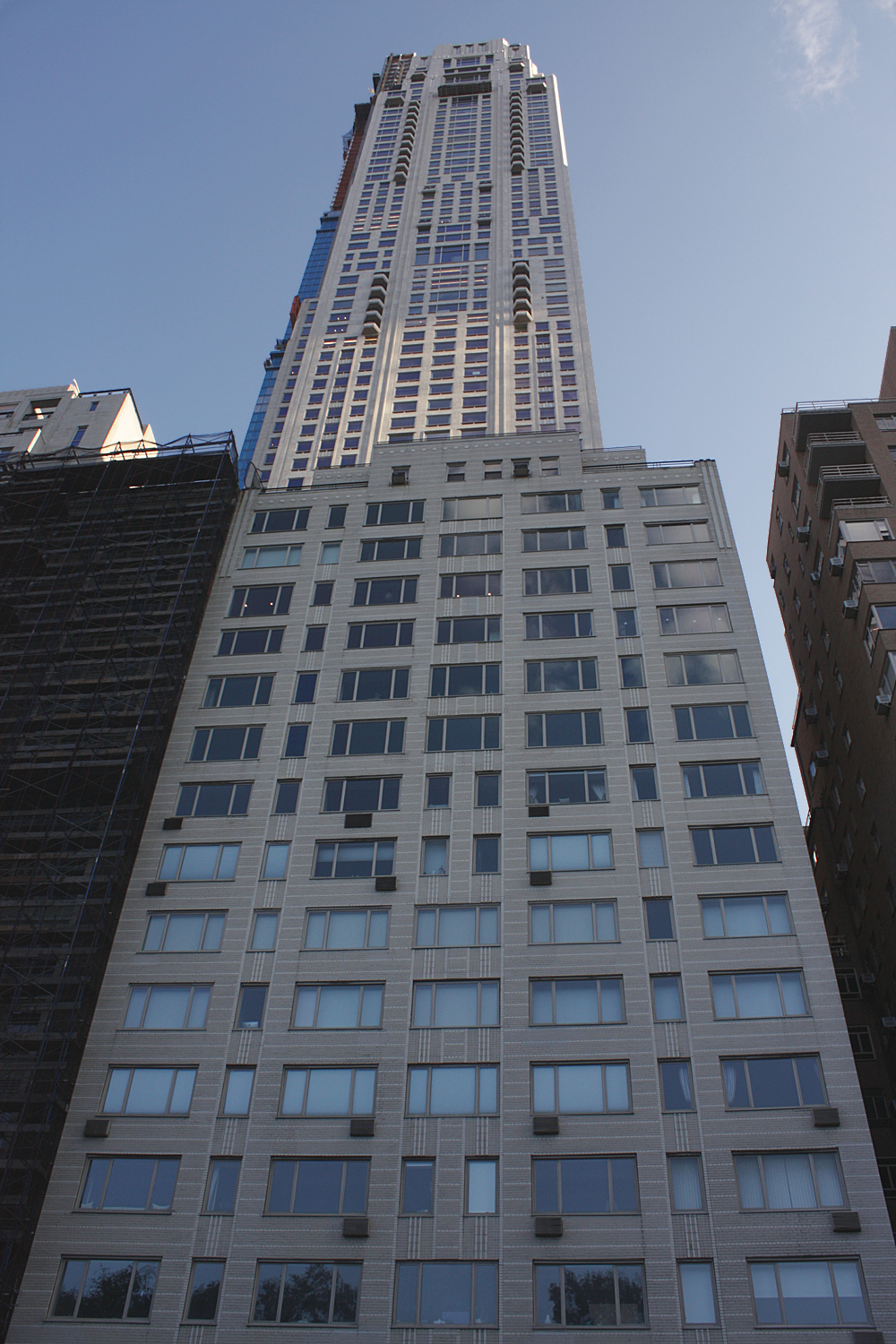
Upper facade from Central Park South in July 2019; Southmoor House (230 Central Park South) in foreground

Facade work was finished by September 2018. By the end of that month, approximately 83% of the condominium units were under sales contracts, and closings were scheduled through 2020. Amid decreased demand for other Billionaires' Row buildings, there were concerns that buyers could abandon the 15–20% deposits that they had paid for their units, though Vornado said that none of the building's condominium buyers had decided to renege on their deals. The first residents started moving into the building in late 2018, and Vornado extended its $750 million unsecured term loan at that time, pushing the loan's maturity from 2020 to 2024. By July 2019, exterior finishes were being placed on 220 Central Park South, and Vornado had repaid its full $950 million loan to the Bank of China. Later the same year, The Wall Street Journal called the building a "positive sign" for an otherwise unfavorable luxury real estate market, even though, at the time, most of the building's pending sales contracts were from buyers who had agreed to buy their units several years prior. By September 2020, the last exterior panels were being installed. In total, 220 Central Park South cost $1.5 billion to construct.

=== Post-completion ===
Real estate sales, particularly on Billionaires' Row, declined in 2020 due to the COVID-19 pandemic in New York City, and there were concerns that people would not buy the few remaining unsold units. Thirty condominiums remained to be sold by September 2020, and units at 220 Central Park South were among the most expensive sold in New York City during that time. Although Vornado lost hundreds of millions of dollars during 2020 because of a commercial real estate downturn caused by the pandemic, the company was able to lessen the loss with revenue from the sales of units at 220 Central Park South. Vornado grossed $1.52 billion from forty-six condominium sales at the building during 2020, including thirteen sales totaling $598 million between January and July. During the third quarter of 2020, the building accounted for nearly one-third of the $1.85 billion of condominium sales recorded in the entire borough of Manhattan. Relatively few of these buyers were brand-new; many of them had indicated their intention to buy condominiums several years prior. Vornado planned to use sales income from 220 Central Park South to finance capital expenditures of its other properties.

Crain's New York wrote in late 2023 that, while Vornado's office portfolio had been losing money in the early 2020s, the building at 220 Central Park South was "something of an outlier" because many of the condos had actually appreciated in value. By then, Roth had shifted his focus to Vornado's office portfolio, having said that Vornado's development of 220 Central Park South was similar to "winning the Kentucky Derby by ten lengths". The popularity of 220 Central Park South, compared to other Billionaires' Row buildings, was attributed to the fact that it was the only Billionaires' Row development that was directly on Central Park South. By January 2025, all except one of the condos had been sold. That June, residents of the neighboring Gainsborough Studios sued Vornado, claiming that Vornado had agreed to pay for damage caused by 220 Central Park South's construction but that the company had not done so.

== Residents ==
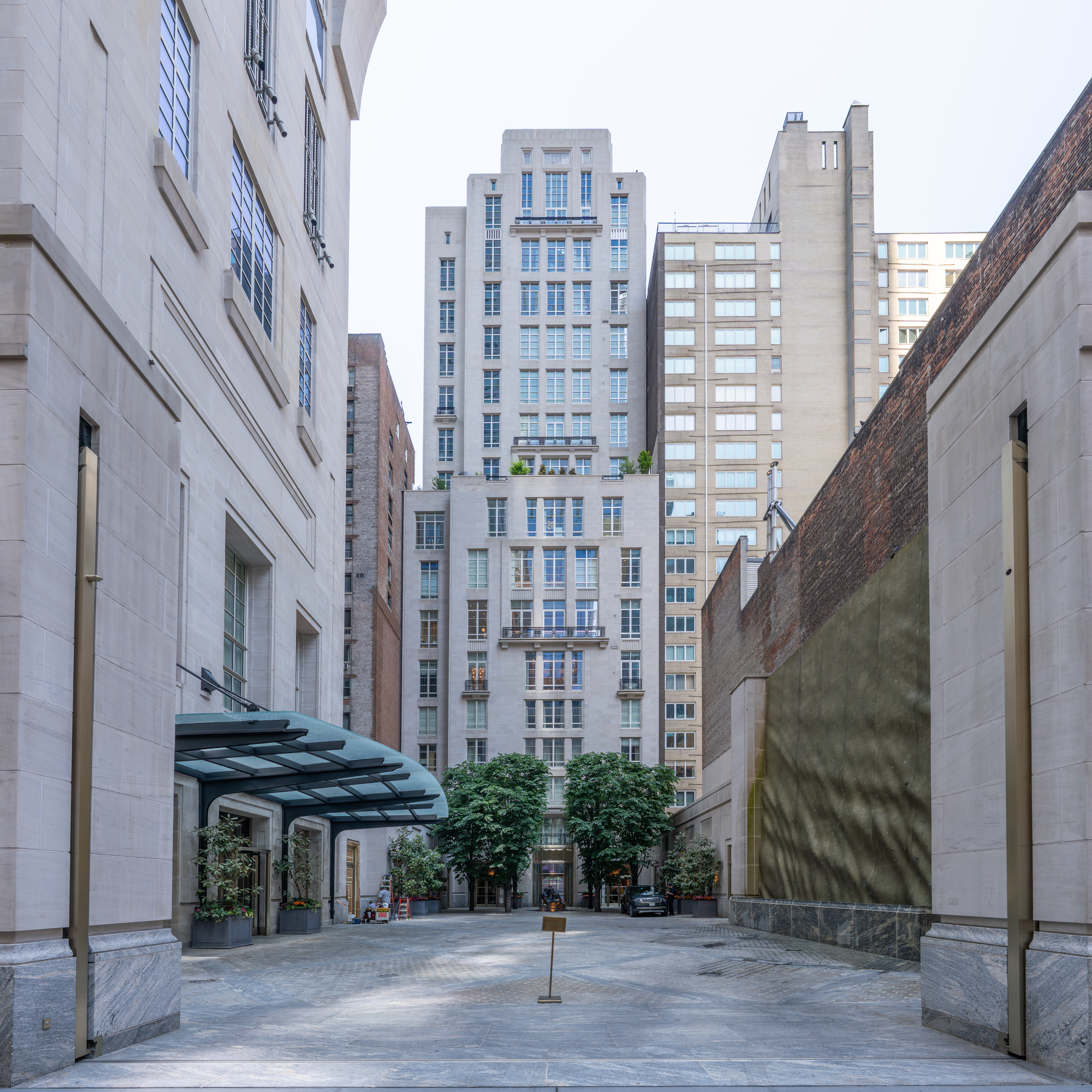
The Villa & the courtyard as seen from 58th Street

Many of the buyers at 220 Central Park South remained anonymous. Buyers purchased units through limited liability companies, and neither Vornado nor the building's selling agent Corcoran Group were willing to divulge buyers' identities. Notable confirmed buyers include executives such as Renata de Camargo Nascimento, co-owner of Brazilian construction company Camargo Correa; Albert Behler, CEO of Paramount Group; Byron Allen, CEO of Entertainment Studios; Eric Smidt, CEO of Harbor Freight Tools; finance executive Andrew Zaro; and real estate investor Richard Leibovitch. Other buyers have included billionaire hedge fund managers Daniel Och and Kenneth C. Griffin; real estate developer David Mandelbaum; musician Sting and his wife, producer and actor Trudie Styler; real-estate investor Ofer Yardeni; and billionaire pharmaceutical businessman Ge Li.

Because Roth wanted to maintain the building's reputation for exclusivity, it did not have a public website (in contrast to other condominiums), and it was never advertised. Prospective buyers had to be represented by a real estate broker, who would request a questionnaire with personal questions about the buyer. If a prospective buyer's responses were deemed satisfactory, they would view a sales office, and Roth would personally interview the buyer, an unusual move for luxury condominiums. Richard Steinberg of the brokerage Douglas Elliman said, "Even if you had the money, it wasn't guaranteed you could get a visit." The high level of scrutiny prompted complaints from potential buyers, who likened the screening process to that of a housing cooperative. Some potential residents had difficulties obtaining interviews, and some international buyers were forced to travel to the U.S. to be interviewed in person. Real-estate brokers speculated that Roth was not willing to sell condominiums to certain foreign buyers regardless of their wealth; one broker claimed that Roth would not sell to Russians in particular, citing money-laundering concerns. Because of Roth's selectiveness, some brokers refused to market units at the building, effectively boycotting it.

=== Apartment sales ===
The first sales contract closed on October 24, 2018, on a unit selling for $16.4 million. The first apartment in the Villas was sold the following year, in May 2019. The first listing for an apartment resale in the building occurred in January 2020, when Leibovitch listed his four-bedroom apartment for $36 million, a $10 million markup from the price at which he had purchased it. He subsequently lowered the price to $33 million, and the unit was sold at that price in September 2021. An August 2025 analysis by The Real Deal found that, of the original owners who had resold their apartments so far, all had made a profit.

The most expensive singular residence in the United States, belonging to Ken Griffin, is located at 220 Central Park South. Griffin, who wanted space on the middle floors of the building, had agreed to purchase three floors in 2015 for $200 million, representing the city's costliest real estate purchase at the time. He finalized his purchase of a four-floor "mega condo" for $238 million in January 2019. Griffin's unit was valued at $9.4 million for tax purposes.

Besides Griffin's purchase, 220 Central Park South has had some of the most expensive residential real estate transactions in New York City's history. An anonymous individual's $100 million purchase of a duplex atop the building became the third costliest residential purchase in New York City; the deal was finalized in July 2020. In June 2021, two full-floor units at floors 60 and 61 were sold for a combined $157.5 million to Joe Tsai; both units had traded for a combined $100 million just the previous year. In January 2022, Tsai bought Daniel Och's penthouse at floor 73 for $188 million, the second-most-expensive residential unit in the United States. Another unit sold in August 2023 for $80 million, making it the city's highest-priced sale of the year. In addition, two apartments sold for a combined $82 million in June 2024, and Byron Allen sold his condo in 2025 for $82.5 million.

== Reception ==
Stern and the coauthors of his 2025 book New York 2020, speaking of Stern's design in the third person, said that critics were generally relieved that the design was deferential to the neighboring, low-rise Gainsborough Studios. When the building was being developed, The New York Observer wrote in 2014 that "220 Central Park South may be [Stern's] biggest hit yet", saying that the design, while not particularly unique, would bolster Stern's reputation as an architect to the super-rich. Mark Maurer of The Real Deal magazine wrote the same year that, when it came to the most-in-demand luxury properties in New York City, 220 Central Park South contended with One57 to fill a role once taken up by 15 Central Park West.

After the building's completion, Martin Filler of The New York Review of Books wrote that 220 Central Park South was relatively better than other Billionaires' Row buildings but that this merely "indicates the generally low architectural state of New York's new housing for the super-rich". Carter Horsley of CityRealty wrote that the revised plans "fussily sullied the tower’s marvelous elan" but complemented the assymmetry of Central Park Tower. Horsley called the building "perhaps [Stern's] finest high-rise design to date". Real-estate agents often compared the building to 15 Central Park West. Members of the public criticized 220 Central Park South, along with the other Billionaires' Row buildings, for its combination of ultra-wealthy inhabitants and extreme height.
