= 20 East End Avenue =

Building in Manhattan, New York

- Interactive map of the 20 East End Avenue area

General information
- Status: Completed
- Type: Residential condominium
- Architectural style: New Classical
- Location: Yorkville, Manhattan, New York City
- Coordinates: 40°46′17″N 73°56′52″W
- Construction started: 2015
- Completed: 2019

Height
- Architectural: 250 feet (76 m)
- Roof: 210 feet (64 m)

Technical details
- Floor count: 18

Design and construction
- Architect: Robert A.M. Stern Architects

20 East End Avenue is a residential condominium apartment building in the Yorkville section of the Upper East Side of Manhattan in New York City. It was designed in a New Classical style by Robert A.M. Stern Architects. The building consists of 43 apartments, including two duplex townhomes, one maisonette and two penthouses.

== Site ==
The building is located on the corner with 80th Street, near Carl Schurz Park, on East End Avenue in Yorkville, a subsection of the Upper East Side of Manhattan. East End Avenue, on the eastern edge of the Upper East Side, has long been home to some of the city's richest residents including Vincent Astor and Gloria Vanderbilt.

== History ==
20 East End Avenue was developed by Edward Baquero of Corigin Real Estate Group. An entry-level, two-bedroom apartment was initially priced at approximately $4.5 million and one of the two penthouses at $39 million. Renderings for the building were released in late 2014. Construction began in early 2015, and the building topped out in November 2015. Facade installation was complete in mid-2016, and residents moved into the building later that year.

== Architecture ==
The building is similar to several others designed by Robert A. M. Stern. It was inspired by buildings constructed in the 1920s and 1930s and other pre-war buildings, particularly those designed by J.E.R. Carpenter and Rosario Candela. The building includes features often found in pre-war buildings, such as a porte-cochère, setbacks, and a brick and Indiana limestone façade. In 2019 the building won the distinguished Stanford White Award for residential architecture.

The building is the last in New York City to incorporate wood-burning fireplaces after New York City banned new ones in 2014. Other amenities include a gym, library, billiards room, poker room, 9,000 bottle wine cellar, private dining room, spa, kid's playroom, and storage facilities.

== See also ==
- 15 Central Park West
- 70 Vestry
