= Bennett Park (Chicago) =

Park in Chicago, Illinois, U.S.

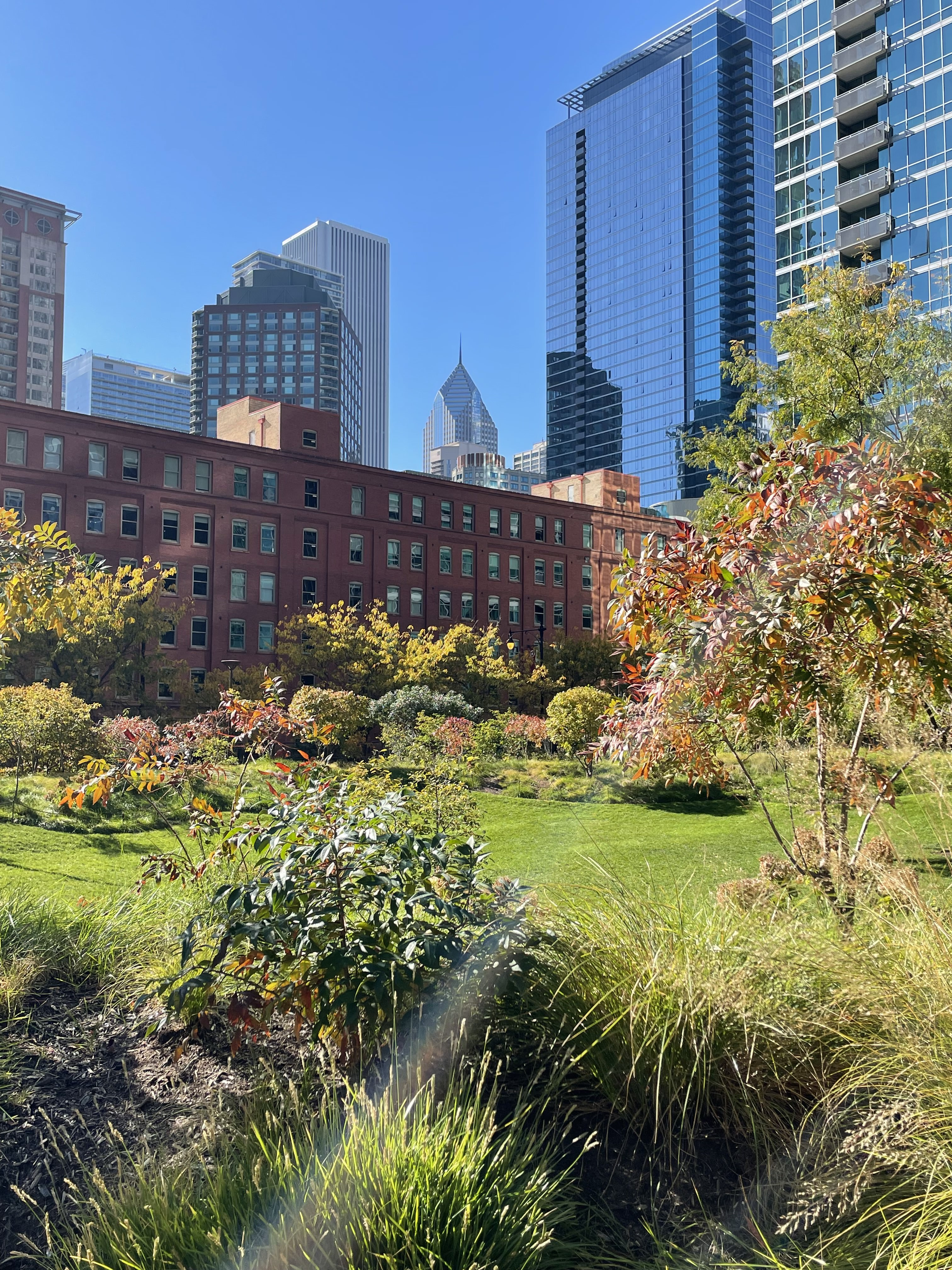
- Fall in the park, looking southwest.
- Interactive map of Bennett Park
- Location: Chicago, Illinois, U.S.
- Coordinates: 41°53′29″N 87°36′59″W
- Area: 2 acres (0.81 ha)

Bennett Park is a 2-acre (0.81 ha) park in the Streeterville neighborhood of Chicago, Illinois. The park is named after Edward H. Bennett, a Chicago architect and urban planner who coauthored the 1909 Plan of Chicago.

The park was redesigned as part of the development of the adjacent residential tower One Bennett Park. The redesign was completed in 2019 and was carried out by landscape architecture firm Michael Van Valkenburgh Associates, which has also designed other Chicago public spaces including The 606, Maggie Daley Park, and the Barack Obama Presidential Center.
