= Richard Leibovitch =

- Born: Richard Graham Leibovitch; October 31st, 1963 (age 62); Montreal, Quebec, Canada
- Education: McGill University (BSc); Cambridge University (MPhil)
- Occupation: Real estate investor

Richard Graham Leibovitch (born October 31, 1963) is a Canadian-American finance and real estate expert who is currently the managing partner of Arel Capital, a private equity real estate firm based in New York City. Prior to this, he was the chief investment officer and senior managing director of Gottex Fund Management, a fund-of-fund based in Lausanne, Switzerland.

== Early life ==
He was born on October 31, 1963, in Montreal, Quebec, Canada to Diane Medina and Edward Leibovitch, and was educated in Montreal. Leibovitch has an honors bachelor's degree in economics from McGill University and an M.Phil. degree in economics from Cambridge University.

== Career highlights and education ==
He founded Arel Capital in 2012 to focus on US real estate investments. From 1985 until 1998 he worked at JP Morgan, starting as a foreign exchange trader and an asset and liability manager for Morgan Bank of Canada. In 1991 he was made responsible for the U.S. dollar swap book, and subsequently became head of all U.S. interest rate derivatives trading, working closely with Peter Bennett and John-Paul Bailey. From 1993 until 1995 he was head of trading of Morgan's mortgage-backed securities business, and from 1995 until 1997 was responsible for the structuring and marketing of derivative products. In 1997, he moved to focus on the equities business as the co-head of Morgan's North American Equity Derivatives business; In 1998 he joined the Derivatives group in New York as the manager of the Canadian and Australian dollar swap books.

In 1999, Leibovitch joined Putnam Investments as head of derivatives. In 2000, he was given the additional responsibility of Global Head Trading, where he oversaw the daily operations of both equity and fixed income trading. He was a member of Putnam's partners and executive committees.

In 2003, he joined Gottex as chief investment officer and senior managing director.
