= Maycroft =

Historic house in New York, United States

- U.S. National Register of Historic Places
- Location within New York Location within the United States
- Location: Ferry Rd. (NY 114), North Haven, New York
- Coordinates: 41°0′33″N 72°18′35″W
- Area: 45 acres (18 ha)
- Built: 1886
- Architect: Lindsey, Edward Delano; White, Gillespie and Far
- Architectural style: Shingle Style
- NRHP reference No.: 95000158
- Added to NRHP: February 24, 1995

Maycroft is a historic estate located at North Haven in Suffolk County, New York. The main house was built in 1886 and is a massive Queen Anne / Shingle Style frame residence. It features horizontal massing, asymmetrical composition, high-pitched multigabled roof, prominent tower and chimneys, and multi-paned window sash. Also on the property are a carriage house, tennis pavilion, brick garage, and frame storage shed. In 1921, the property was deeded to the Episcopal Diocese of Long Island and used initially as a summer camp and vacation retreat for business women. In 1952, it was occupied by the Teachers of the Children of God order, who operate the Tuller School.

It was added to the National Register of Historic Places in 1995.
