= Superior Ink =

Residential development in Manhattan, New York

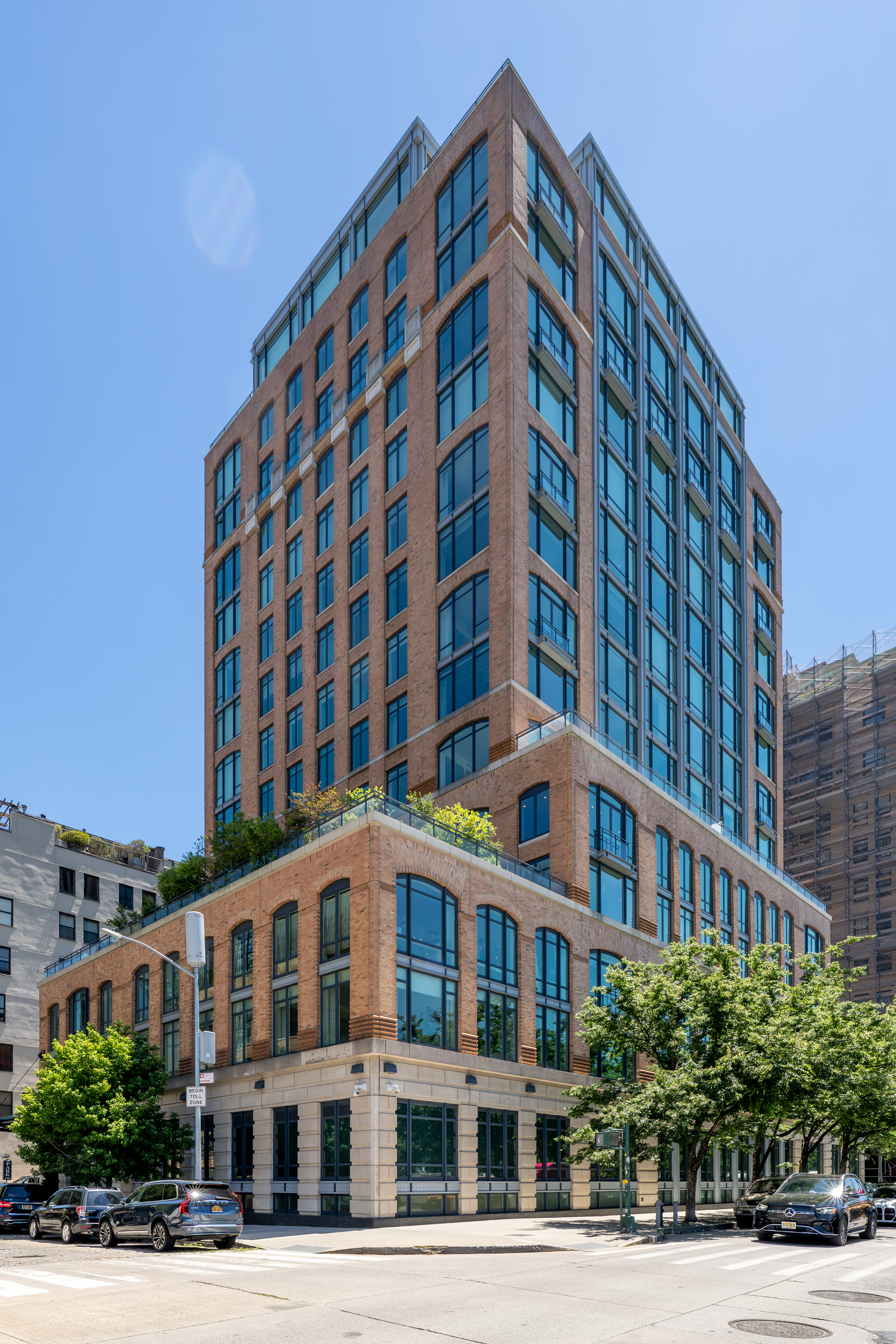
- Interactive map of the Superior Ink area

General information
- Status: Completed
- Type: Mixed use
- Location: 400 West 12th Street; Manhattan, New York City
- Coordinates: 40.737288°N 74.009467°W
- Completed: 2009

Height
- Roof: 190 feet (58 m)

Technical details
- Floor count: 17

Design and construction
- Architect: Robert A.M. Stern Architects

Superior Ink is a residential complex located in Manhattan, composed of a seventeen-story condominium building, and nine town houses. Construction was completed in 2009, and the complex was developed by The Related Companies. Robert A.M. Stern Architects designed the buildings.

== History and construction ==
The complex was built by The Related Companies, a New York-based developer. The set of buildings are named for, and on the site of, the former Superior Ink Factory, which was built in 1919. The demolition of the Superior Ink Factory was controversial, and opposed by preservationists and residents of the community. The original architect chosen by Related, Charles Gwathmey, was eventually replaced with Robert A.M. Stern Architects. Gwathmey previously designed the Astor Place Tower for Related, a building that received negative reviews and poor sales.

The building was one of Related's first to be built with a distributed antenna system to boost cell phone reception for its tenants. The building was flooded and damaged during Hurricane Sandy.

=== Design ===
The development is split between a condominium apartment building and seven town houses. The apartment building reflects the design of factories located on the original Superior Ink factory grounds. Arthur Lublow, writing for The New York Times, criticized the town houses, complaining that they were not similar to other town houses in Greenwich Village, but rather resembled those on the Upper East Side given their heavy ornamentation.

== Celebrity residents ==
Notable individuals who have lived in the building include Anne M. Mulcahy and Hilary Swank.
