= Paul Mellon Arts Center =

Building at Choate Rosemary Hall

- Interactive map of the Paul Mellon Arts Center area
- Alternative names: PMAC

General information
- Location: 41°27′30″N 72°48′30″W, 332 Christian Street, Wallingford, CT 06492, Wallingford, Connecticut, United States of America

Design and construction
- Architect: I. M. Pei

The Paul Mellon Arts Center (PMAC) is an arts building on the campus of Choate Rosemary Hall, Wallingford, Connecticut designed by architect I. M. Pei.

The original design began in 1968 and the building was completed in 1972. It was funded in large part by school alumnus Paul Mellon, who was also responsible as the National Gallery's president for Pei's commission for the East Building of the National Gallery of Art, Washington, D.C. at roughly the same time.

== Structure ==
The physical structure has a rectangular footprint but is divided into two wings: the Theater Wing, which houses a 760-seat, two level proscenium theater as well as a black box theater; and the Triangle Wing, which has five levels of practice rooms, art studios, classrooms, offices, and a recording studio. The two wings are connected underground by the black box theater.

The building was constructed around the time at which the Rosemary Hall school for girls and the Choate School for boys joined to become a single, coeducational institution and quickly became a physical and symbolic link between the two campuses. Today, it retains less of this meaning, for the two schools' campuses are no longer separated as they were in the early 1970s.

== Renovation ==
The building is currently being renovated as of Spring 2025, and is scheduled to re-open Fall 2026. According to the PMAC website, the new space will be "an intimate theatre designed to support drama and dance performances," "fully accessible," and include new lighting, audio and rigging systems. The first performance in the newly renovated Little Theatre will be Choate Rosemary Hall's production of Sense and Sensibility.
