= 520 Park Avenue =

Residential skyscraper in Manhattan, New York

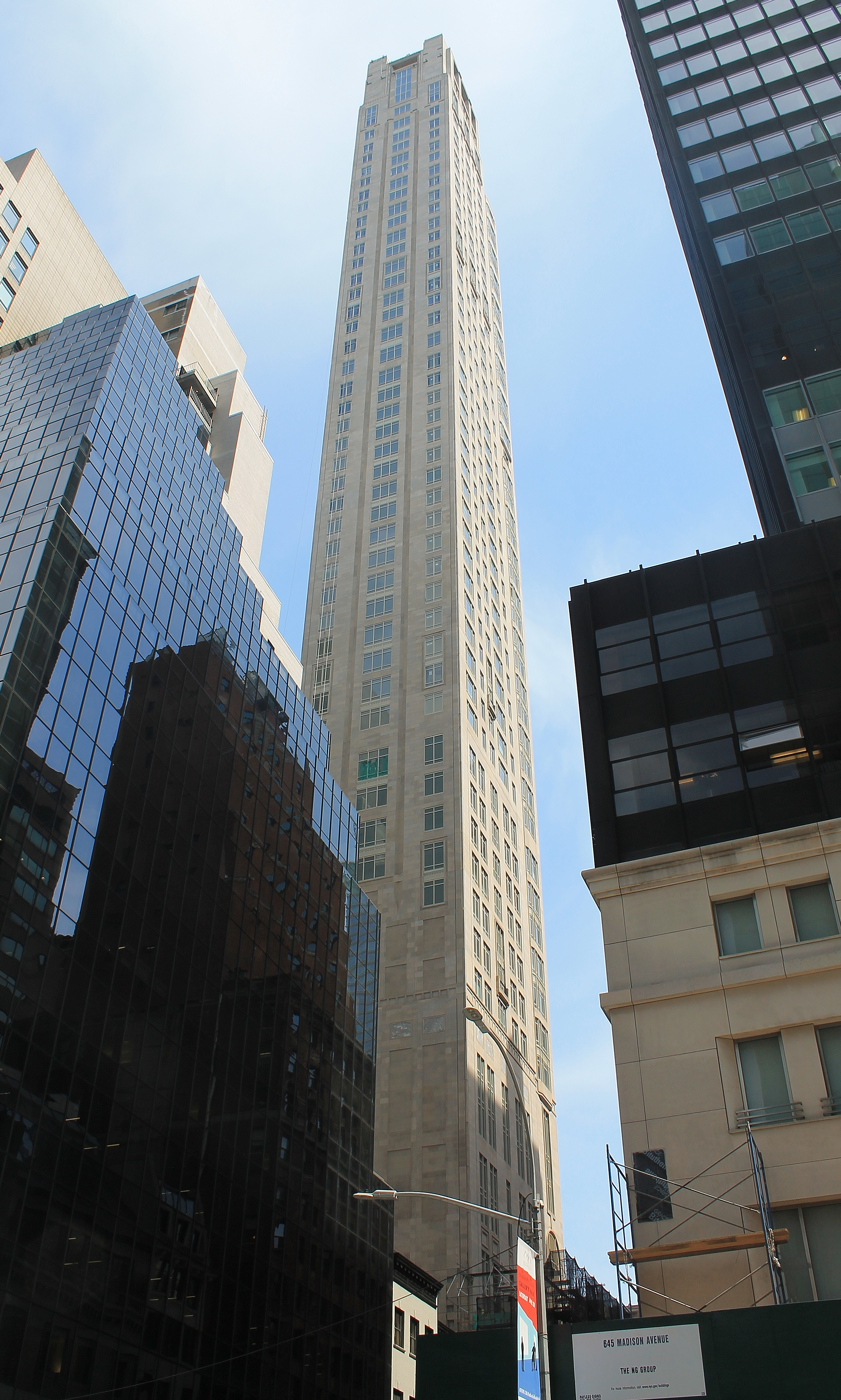
- 520 Park Avenue, April 2018
- Interactive map of the 520 Park Avenue area

General information
- Status: Completed
- Type: Residential
- Architectural style: New classical
- Coordinates: 40°45′50.5″N 73°58′12″W
- Construction started: 2014
- Completed: 2018

Height
- Height: 781 ft (238 m)

Technical details
- Floor count: 54

Design and construction
- Architect: Robert A.M. Stern Architects
- Developer: Zeckendorf Development
- Main contractor: Bovis Lend Lease

Website
- 520parkavenue.com

520 Park Avenue is a skyscraper on East 60th Street near Park Avenue on the Upper East Side of Manhattan, New York City. It was designed by Robert A.M. Stern Architects and completed in 2018. The building was funded through a US$450 million construction loan from The Children's Investment Fund. At 781 feet tall, it is the 36th tallest building in New York City and the tallest on the Upper East Side. Arthur and William Lie Zeckendorf of Zeckendorf Development developed the building.

== Architecture ==
Like much of Stern's work, the building is New Classical in style. The exterior of the building is clad in limestone, similar to Stern's other New York City skyscrapers including 15 Central Park West, 30 Park Place and 220 Central Park South. The developer, Arthur Zeckendorf has described the building as the East Side sister of 15 Central Park West.

The building has 35 apartments in its 64 stories including a $130 million triplex penthouse. Prices begin at over $20 million for a 4,600 square feet (430 m^{2}) apartment, and residences close to the top have balconies.

=== Amenities ===
The building includes an outside garden, private movie theater, children's playroom, swimming pool, wine cellars and a bi-level fitness center. The building offers more than 15,000 square feet (1,400 m^{2}) of amenities and amenity spaces for residents.

== History ==
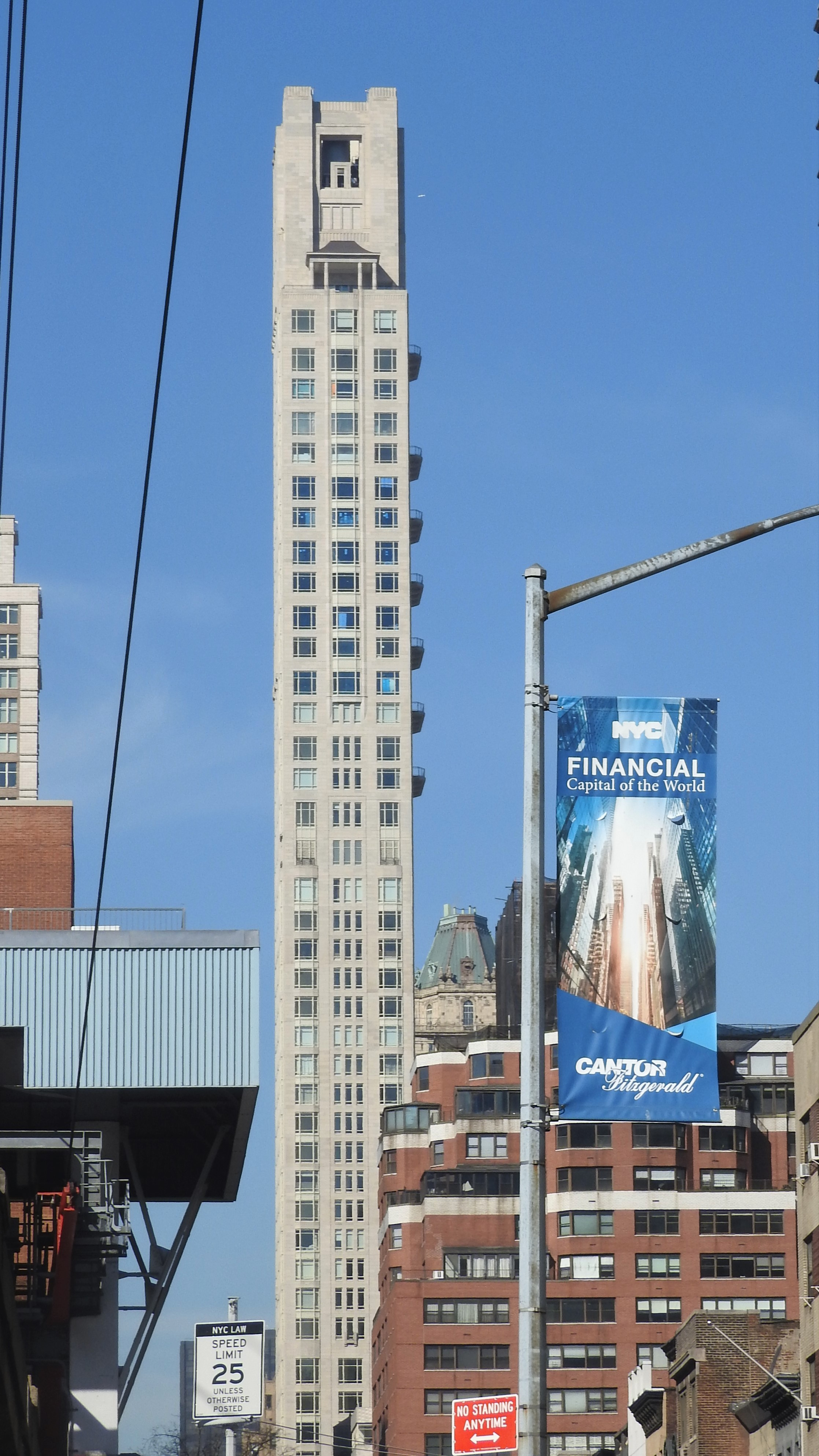
February 2020

The developers had been planning a building since 2006, but were delayed by difficulties vacating the previous commercial building on the site. Plans for the building were first announced in December 2012, with the selection of Robert A.M. Stern Architects. Shortly after, the developers purchased 70,000 square feet (6,500 m^{2}) of air rights from the neighboring Christ Church United Methodist and Grolier Club for over $40 million. The design was officially unveiled in March 2014, and the building was completed in 2018. The last penthouse unit was sold in 2024.

== Notable residents ==
Residents who have purchased units include:

- Orlando Bravo, private equity investment manager
- Frank Fertitta III, the former owner of UFC
- James Dyson, the founder of Dyson
- Ken Moelis, an investment banker
- Bob Diamond, former CEO of Barclays
- Ronn Torossian, a public relations executive
