= 70 Vestry =

Building in New York City, New York, United States

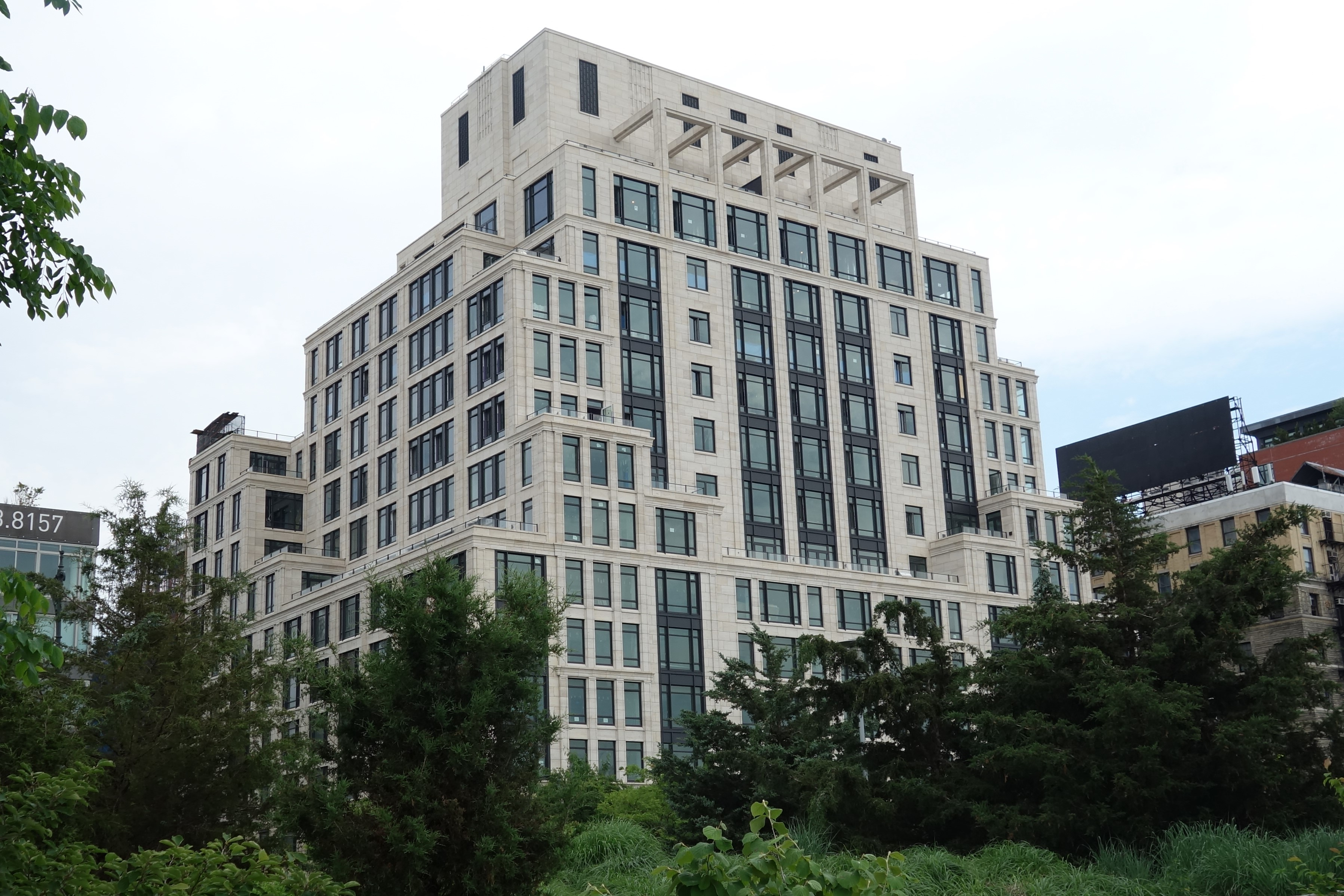
- 70 Vestry in June 2018.
- Interactive map of the 70 Vestry area

General information
- Status: Completed
- Type: Residential
- Location: 70 Vestry Street, Tribeca, Manhattan, New York City, New York, United States
- Coordinates: 40.722921°N 74.011395°W
- Construction started: 2016
- Topped-out: April 2017
- Estimated completion: 2018

Height
- Height: 155 feet (47 m)

Technical details
- Floor count: 14

Design and construction
- Architects: Robert A.M. Stern Architects; Ismael Leyva; Daniel Romualdez Architects

70 Vestry is a thirteen-story residential building in the Tribeca neighborhood of Manhattan, in New York City. The building was designed by the New Classical firm Robert A.M. Stern Architects.

== History and construction ==
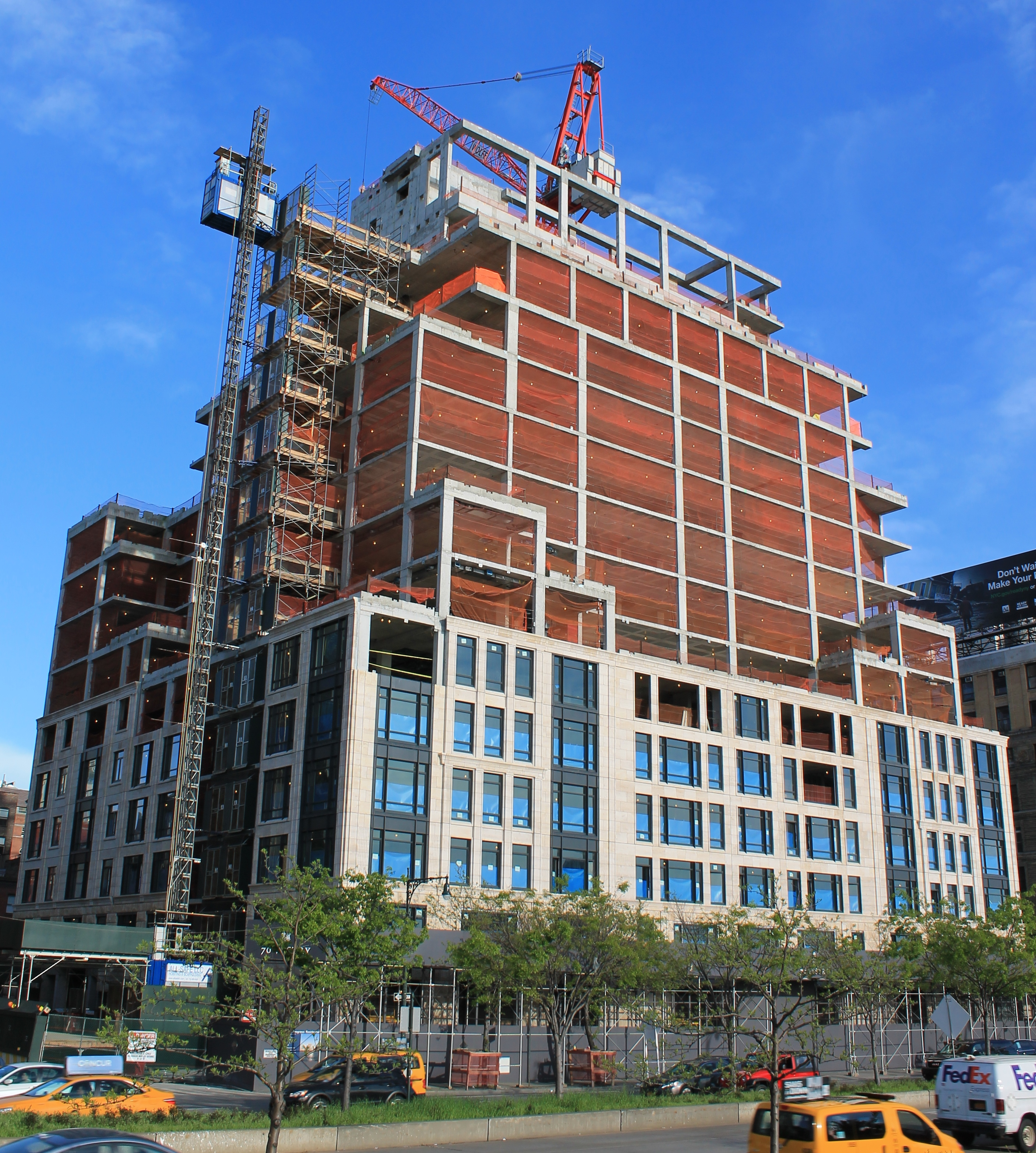
70 Vestry under construction in April 2017.

Early renderings for the building were first released in mid-2015. The building secured $200 million in construction financing from Bank of America in late 2015. Robert A.M. Stern Architects chose limestone as the material for the exterior of 70 Vestry.

== Usage and amenities ==
The building is exclusively residential, with forty-seven units spread across thirteen floors. The largest of these units is over 10,000 square feet (930 m^{2}) and is priced at $65 million. The building will feature an automated parking system. Other amenities will include a library, exercise facilities, and a swimming pool.

== Residents ==
The building is featured in the 2021 Netflix reality series My Unorthodox Life, about fashion designer and model agency CEO Julia Haart. She and her husband, Italian entrepreneur Silvio Scaglia Haart, bought a penthouse in the building in December 2018.

NFL quarterback Tom Brady and his wife, Gisele Bündchen, bought an apartment in 2018 for $25.5 million. They sold it in December 2020 for $36.8 million as they transitioned to Florida after Brady moved to the Tampa Bay Buccaneers. The couple now owns a smaller pied-à-terre in the building.

British Formula One race-car driver Lewis Hamilton bought a $40 million unit in 2019.
