= Hudson Yards, Manhattan =

Neighborhood in New York City

Hudson Yards
- Neighborhood of Manhattan
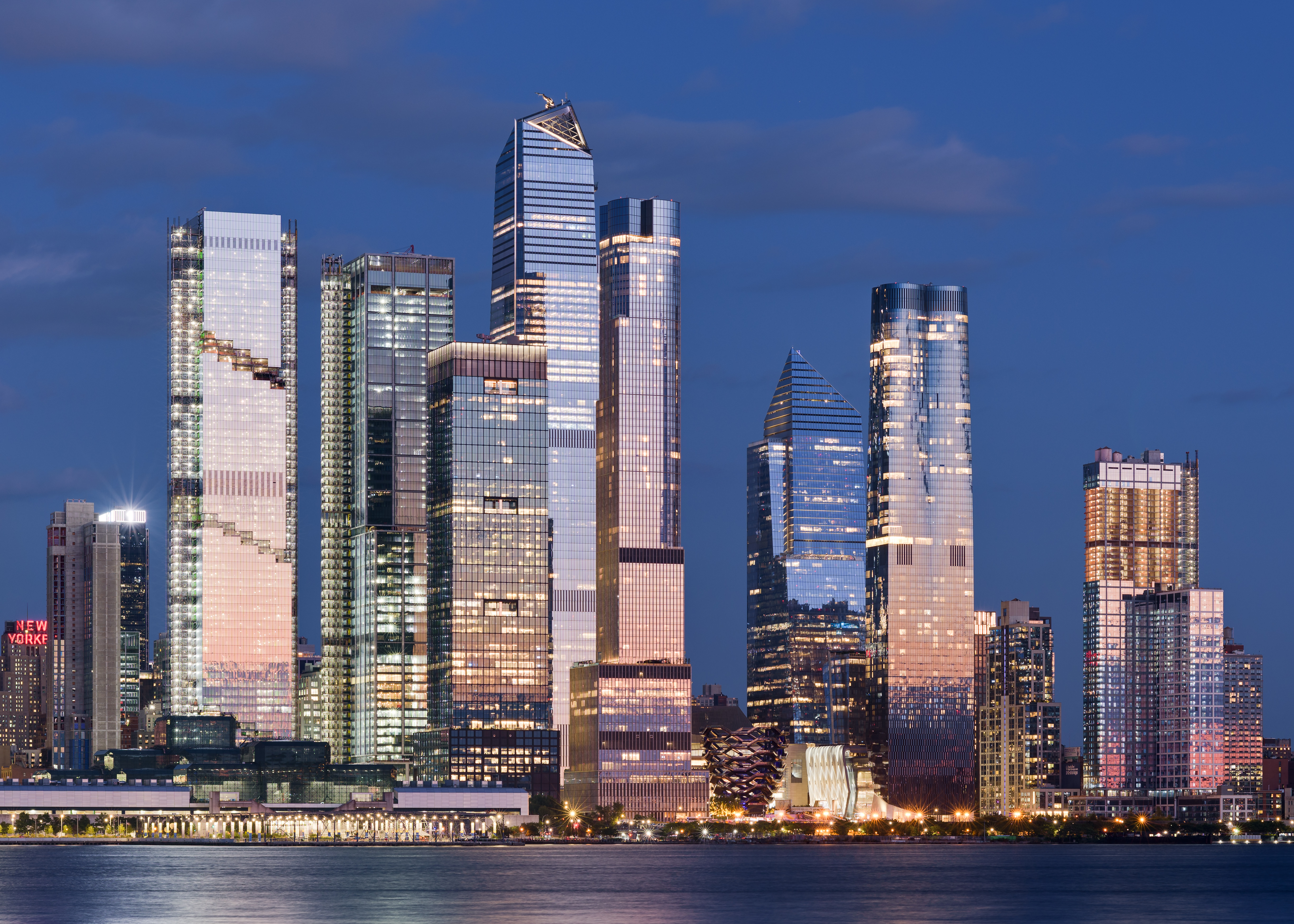
- Hudson Yards at dusk seen from Weehawken, New Jersey
- Interactive map of Hudson Yards
- Coordinates: 40°45′22″N 74°00′02″W
- Country: United States
- State: New York
- City: New York City
- Borough: Manhattan
- Community District: Manhattan 4

Population (2010)
  - Total: 70,150
- Neighborhood tabulation area; includes Chelsea

Ethnicity
  - White: 65.1%
  - Hispanic: 14.6
  - Asian: 11.8
  - Black: 5.7
  - Others: 2.8
- Time zone: UTC−05:00 (Eastern)
  - Summer (DST): UTC−04:00 (EDT)
- ZIP Codes: 10001, 10018
- Area code: 212, 332, 646, and 917

Hudson Yards is a neighborhood on the West Side of Midtown Manhattan in New York City, bounded roughly by 30th Street in the south, 41st Street in the north, the West Side Highway in the west, and Eighth Avenue in the east. The area is the site of a large-scale redevelopment program that is being planned, funded, and constructed under a set of agreements among the State of New York, City of New York, and Metropolitan Transportation Authority (MTA), with the aim of expanding the Midtown Manhattan business district westward to the Hudson River. The program includes a major rezoning of the Far West Side, an extension of the New York City Subway's 7 and <7> trains to a new subway station at 34th Street and 11th Avenue, a renovation and expansion of the Javits Center, and a financing plan to fund the various components. The various components are being planned by the New York City Department of City Planning and New York City Economic Development Corporation.

The largest of the projects made possible by the rezoning is the 28-acre (11 ha) multiuse Hudson Yards real estate development by Related Companies and Oxford Properties, which is being built over the West Side Rail Yard. Construction began in 2012 with the groundbreaking for 10 Hudson Yards, and is projected to be completed by 2024. According to its master plan, created by Kohn Pedersen Fox Associates, the Hudson Yards development would include 16 skyscrapers to be constructed in two phases. Architects including Skidmore, Owings, and Merrill, Thomas Heatherwick, Roche-Dinkeloo, and Diller Scofidio + Renfro contributed designs for individual structures. Major office tenants include or will include Tapestry, Equinox Fitness, and BlackRock.

The area includes other major development projects. One such project is Manhattan West, developed by Brookfield Property Partners over the rail yard west of Ninth Avenue between 31st and 33rd streets. Other structures being developed in the Hudson Yards Zoning District include 3 Hudson Boulevard and the Spiral. The special district also includes Pennsylvania Station, the subject of a major overhaul.

Hudson Yards is part of Manhattan Community District 4 and its primary ZIP Codes are 10001 and 10018. It is patrolled by the 10th Precinct of the New York City Police Department.

== Geography ==
"Hudson Yards" takes its name from the MTA rail yard along the Hudson River between 30th Street and 33rd Street, part of a Penn Central rail yard that once extended to 39th Street. The portion of the MTA yard between the river and Eleventh Avenue is called the Western Rail Yard, and the portion between Eleventh Avenue and Tenth Avenue is called the Eastern Rail Yard. The Hudson Yards area includes parts of the Garment Center, the Javits Convention Center, Madison Square Garden, the Port Authority Bus Terminal, the Farley Post Office, and the Lincoln Tunnel. Most of the Hudson Yards redevelopment area is also known as Hell's Kitchen South. The special purpose district covering the area, the Special Hudson Yards District, includes a "Hell's Kitchen subdistrict", encompassing the core residential area existing prior to redevelopment of the surrounding area. The subdistrict extends between 30th Street to the south and 41st Street to the north.

== Context ==
=== Early plans ===
There has been a long series of proposals to develop the rail yard air rights, including for a major expansion of Midtown Manhattan by William Zeckendorf in the 1950s and for a housing development considered by U.S. Steel in the 1960s. The idea of building housing on air rights over the rail yard, with commercial development between 34th Street and 42nd Street, was included in a plan announced by Mayor Robert F. Wagner Jr. in 1963 that would have included projects covering a swath of Manhattan from its southern tip up to 72nd Street.

The administration of John Lindsay maintained the goal of the 1963 plan—a westward expansion of Midtown—but shifted their focus to the blocks north of 42nd Street, home to 35,000 residents of the Hell's Kitchen neighborhood. As a first step, the City approved a convention center on 44th Street. But after the defeat of a bond issue that would have funded a 48th Street "people mover", the City abandoned it and the rest of the master plan. At the same time the local Hell's Kitchen community proposed that midtown expansion take place south of 42nd Street instead. A community-proposed convention center site—between Eleventh and Twelfth avenues from 34th to 39th streets—was later promoted by Donald Trump, who had obtained an option on the rail yard from the bankrupt Penn Central in 1975. Facing political opposition and the severe fiscal crisis of the 1970s, the City and State eventually chose the rail yard site when the 44th Street site proved to be too expensive. However Trump's offer to build the convention center was rejected. In 1987 the Metropolitan Transportation Authority (MTA) converted the remainder of the rail yard into a storage facility for commuter trains; the new West Side Yard was designed with space left between the tracks for columns to support development in air rights above the tracks.

Despite the completion of the Jacob K. Javits Convention Center in 1986, no further development took place. One impediment to development was a lack of mass transit in the area, which is far from Penn Station, and none of the proposals for a link to Penn Station were pursued successfully (for example, the ill-fated West Side Transitway). No changes to the zoning happened until 1990, when the city rezoned a small segment of 11th Avenue across the street from the Javits Center. However, as most of the area was still zoned for manufacturing and low-rise apartment buildings, the rezoning did not spur development.

=== Redevelopment begins ===
==== Formal planning ====
The Hell's Kitchen community's 1973 proposal for major office and residential development south of 42nd Street was finally realized when all impediments to development were addressed. In 2003, the New York City Department of City Planning issued a master plan that envisioned the creation of 40,000,000 ft^{2} (3,700,000 m^{2}) of commercial and residential development, two corridors of open space – one between Eleventh Avenue and Tenth Avenue, and another network of open space between Ninth Avenue and Tenth Avenue to create a park system from West 39th Street to West 34th Street, portions of which would be located along the Dyer Avenue/Lincoln Tunnel Expressway corridors. Dubbed the Hudson Yards Master Plan, the area covered is bordered on the east by Seventh and Eighth Avenues, on the south by West 28th and 30th Streets, on the north by West 43rd Street, and on the west by Hudson River Park and the Hudson River. The city's plan was similar to a neighborhood plan produced by architect Meta Brunzema and environmental planner Daniel Gutman for the Hell's Kitchen Neighborhood Association (HKNA). The main concept of the HKNA plan was to allow major new development while protecting the existing residential core area between Ninth and Tenth avenues.

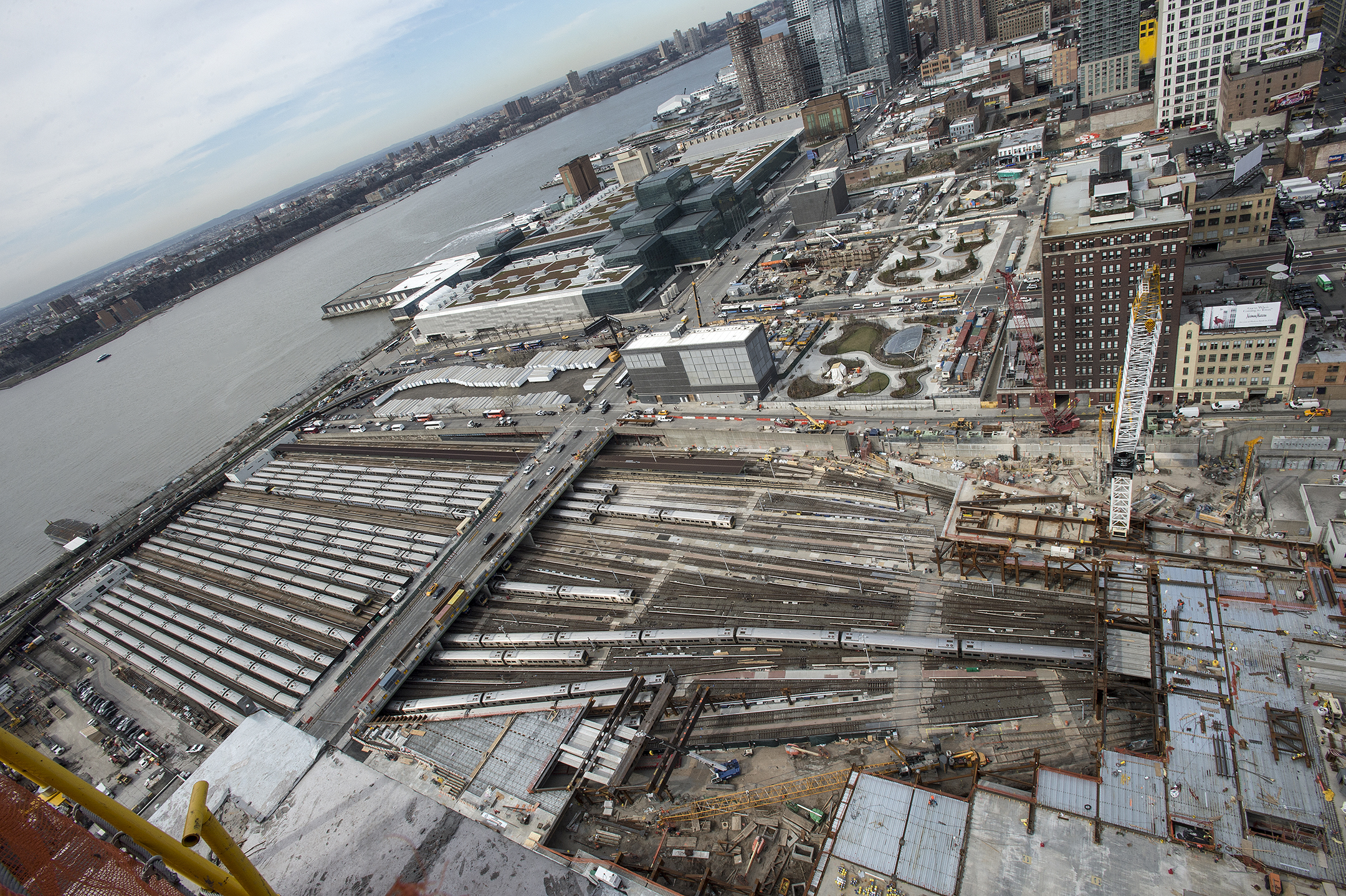
Aerial view of location of the Hudson Yards area, including the rail yard in the foreground, the Javits Center on the upper left, and the blocks between Tenth and Eleventh avenues up to 43rd Street.

To help facilitate development, the city's plan called for extending the IRT Flushing Line to a 34th Street subway station under Eleventh Avenue at the rail yard, and next to the Jacob K. Javits Convention Center, which would be expanded by the State. To fund the subway and a park and boulevard and other infrastructure, the City proposed a novel tax-increment financing scheme within a Hudson Yards financing district to collect both residential property taxes and commercial payments-in-lieu-of-taxes (PILOTS) and sell transferable development rights to prospective developers. A Hudson Yards Infrastructure Corporation would issue bonds against expected revenues.

In January 2005, the New York City Council approved the 60-block rezoning, including the eastern portion of the West Side Yard. The newly rezoned Hudson Yards area was to have 25,800,000 sq ft (2,400,000 m^{2}) of Class A office space, 20,000 housing units, two million sq ft (190,000 m^{2}) of hotel space, a 750-seat public school, one million sq ft (93,000 m^{2}) of retail and more than 20 acres (8 ha) of public open space.

The rezoning and financing district did not include the western portion of the rail yard; this was reserved for the proposed West Side Stadium, which would have been built as part of the New York City bid for the 2012 Summer Olympics. At the conclusion of the Olympics, the stadium would have been used by the New York Jets. When not in use for football, the covered stadium would be a venue for conventions at the Javits Center, and so proposers dubbed the structure the "New York Sports and Convention Center". This effort, led by Deputy Mayor Daniel Doctoroff, was unpopular with both the public and politicians. Consequently, the City Council insisted that financing for the city's broader rezoning plans not be used to subsidize the rail yard stadium. In June 2005, the stadium proposal was defeated, and after the International Olympic Committee awarded the 2012 Olympics to London, the stadium proposal was permanently scrapped. The city government subsequently rezoned the western rail yard for residential and commercial development and added it to the financing district. The Metropolitan Transportation Authority (MTA) then sought to develop the 26-acre (11 ha) yard, and in conjunction with the city government, the MTA issued a Request for Proposal (RFP) for a 12,700,000 sq ft (1,180,000 m^{2}) mixed-use development to be built on platforms over the rail yard, which would remain in use throughout.

==== Rail yard development bids ====
Five developers responded to the RFP: Extell, Tishman Speyer, Brookfield, Vornado, and the Related Companies. Tishman Speyer won the bid in March 2008. Tishman Speyer entered into a 99-year lease with the MTA, paying $1 billion for the air rights. It would also spend another $2 billion for development over the rail yards, including for the two platforms over the yards to support 15 acres (6.1 ha) of public spaces, four office buildings, and ten high-rise residential towers.

However, just two months later, the deal broke down due to the 2008 financial crisis. Subsequently, the MTA chose the Related Companies and Goldman Sachs to develop Hudson Yards under the same conditions. In December 2009, the New York City Council approved Related Companies' revised plan for Hudson Yards, and the western portion of the West Side Yard was rezoned. Following the rail yards' successful rezoning, the MTA signed another 99-year lease to the air rights over the rail yard in May 2010. The air rights were signed over to a joint venture of Related Companies and Oxford Properties Group, which invested $400 million to build a platform above both the eastern and western portions of the yard on which to construct the buildings. Groundbreaking for 10 Hudson Yards, the first building, occurred on December 4, 2012.

In April 2013, the Related/Oxford joint venture obtained a $475 million construction loan from parties including Barry Sternlicht's Starwood Capital Group and luxury retailer Coach. The financing deal was unique in several aspects, including the fact that it included a construction mezzanine loan, that Coach was a lender on both the debt and equity sides, and that the MTA reused a "severable lease" structure (previously used by Battery Park City) that allowed for the loans. A portion of the project was also financed by the EB-5 investment program, which provides a path for immigrants to become green card holders after investing capital in project which employs American workers.

== Transportation ==
=== Bus ===
The M12 and M34 SBS serve 34th Street, and the M12, M42 and M50 serve 42nd Street. The M12 was introduced to improve transit on the far west side, including Hudson Yards, in 2014.

=== Subway extension ===
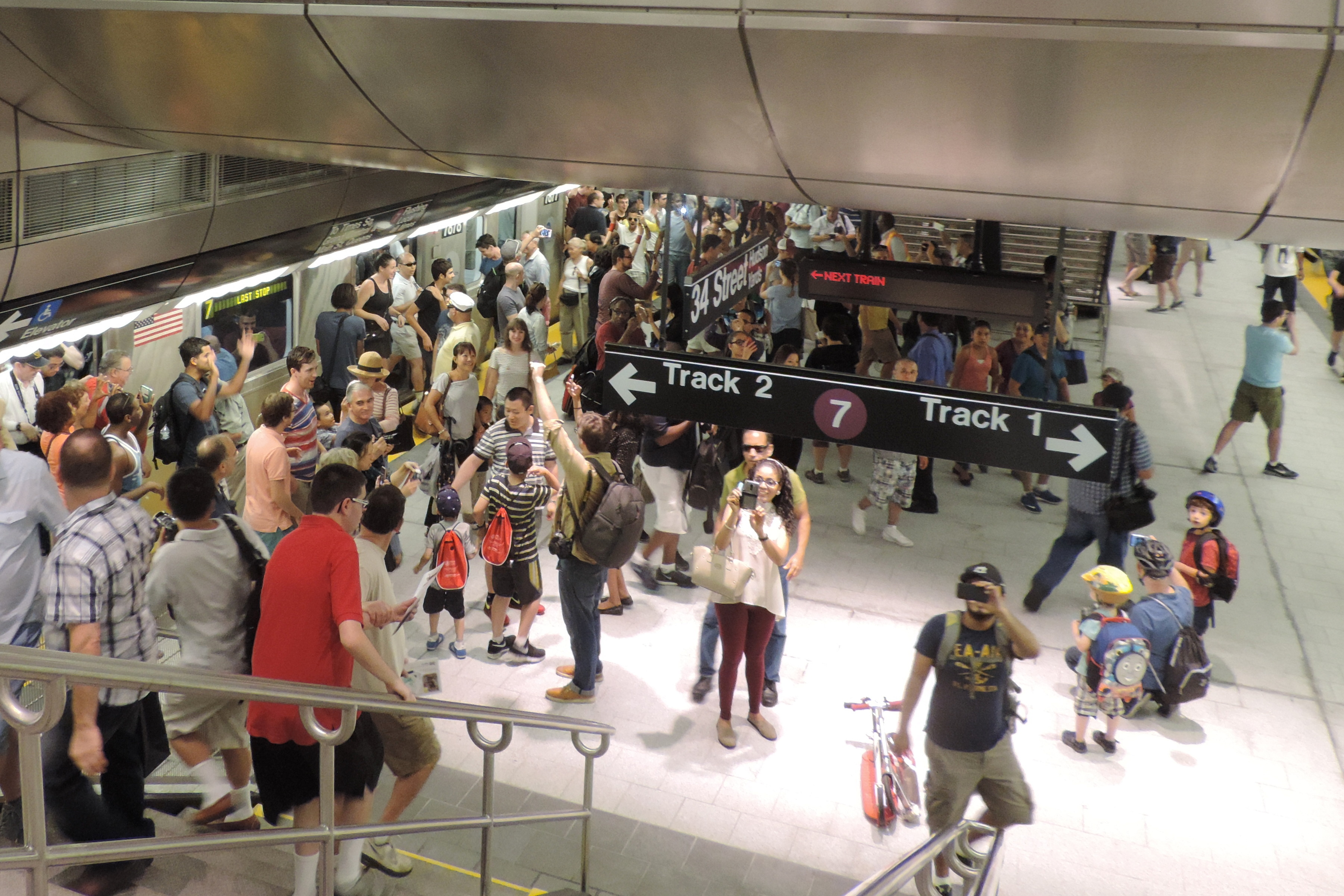
The new 34th Street subway station, September 2015

After the Hudson Yards project was approved in 2005, the MTA received proceeds from the initial 2006 bond offering to pay for the 7 Subway Extension to 34th Street–Hudson Yards station. With funding assured, the MTA proceeded quickly to construct the extension. The first construction contracts were awarded in October 2007. After a series of delays related to the construction of the 34th Street station, the subway extension opened on September 13, 2015. The station connects to nearby buildings and developments, including 30 Hudson Yards and Hudson Park and Boulevard. The 34th Street station's main entrance, escalators and an elevator on the west side of Hudson Park and Boulevard between 33rd and 34th Streets, is at the foot of 55 Hudson Yards and is just half a block away from the rail yard's northern edge. Another station, planned for Tenth Avenue and 41st Street, was not built.

== Parks ==
The platform atop which the Related development was built includes a 6-acre (2 ha) public square. In the middle of the square is Vessel, a 16-story structure of freestanding, connected staircases designed by Thomas Heatherwick.

Hudson Park and Boulevard, a four-acre system of parks and roads, is located north of the rail yard site, extending from 33rd Street to 39th Street, mid-block between Tenth Avenue and Eleventh Avenue. The boulevard is divided into a Hudson Boulevard East and a Hudson Boulevard West, with the park between the two. The first phase, between 33rd and 36th Streets, was completed in August 2015. Proposed parks between Ninth and Tenth avenues in the original plan were later dropped.

The High Line, an elevated park using the former right-of-way of the southern portion of the West Side railroad line, runs along Hudson Yards' southern and western edges before continuing south to Gansevoort Street in the Meatpacking District; its northern terminus is at 11th Avenue and 34th Street on the north side of Hudson Yards. In 2012, the city government acquired the northernmost section of the High Line from CSX Transportation. In late 2014, the final phase of the High Line opened. It enters the Hudson Yards site and curves along 30th Street, Twelfth Avenue and 34th Street, with a spur along 30th Street to Tenth Avenue. The High Line is integrated with the Related Development's buildings; for example, 10 Hudson Yards cantilevers over the Spur. Dubbed "High Line at the Rail Yards", the section was built in three phases. The right-of-way from 30th Street was extended into the Hudson Yards site, running parallel to 30th Street past Eleventh Avenue, and developed in a manner similar to the previous sections of the park. The Spur along 30th Street received an amphitheater, restrooms, trees and grasses above Tenth Avenue. Finally, the curved section around the western part of Hudson Yards was originally developed as an "interim walkway", with further construction occurring in 2015. There are entrances to the High Line from within the rail-yard development.

== Hudson Yards development ==
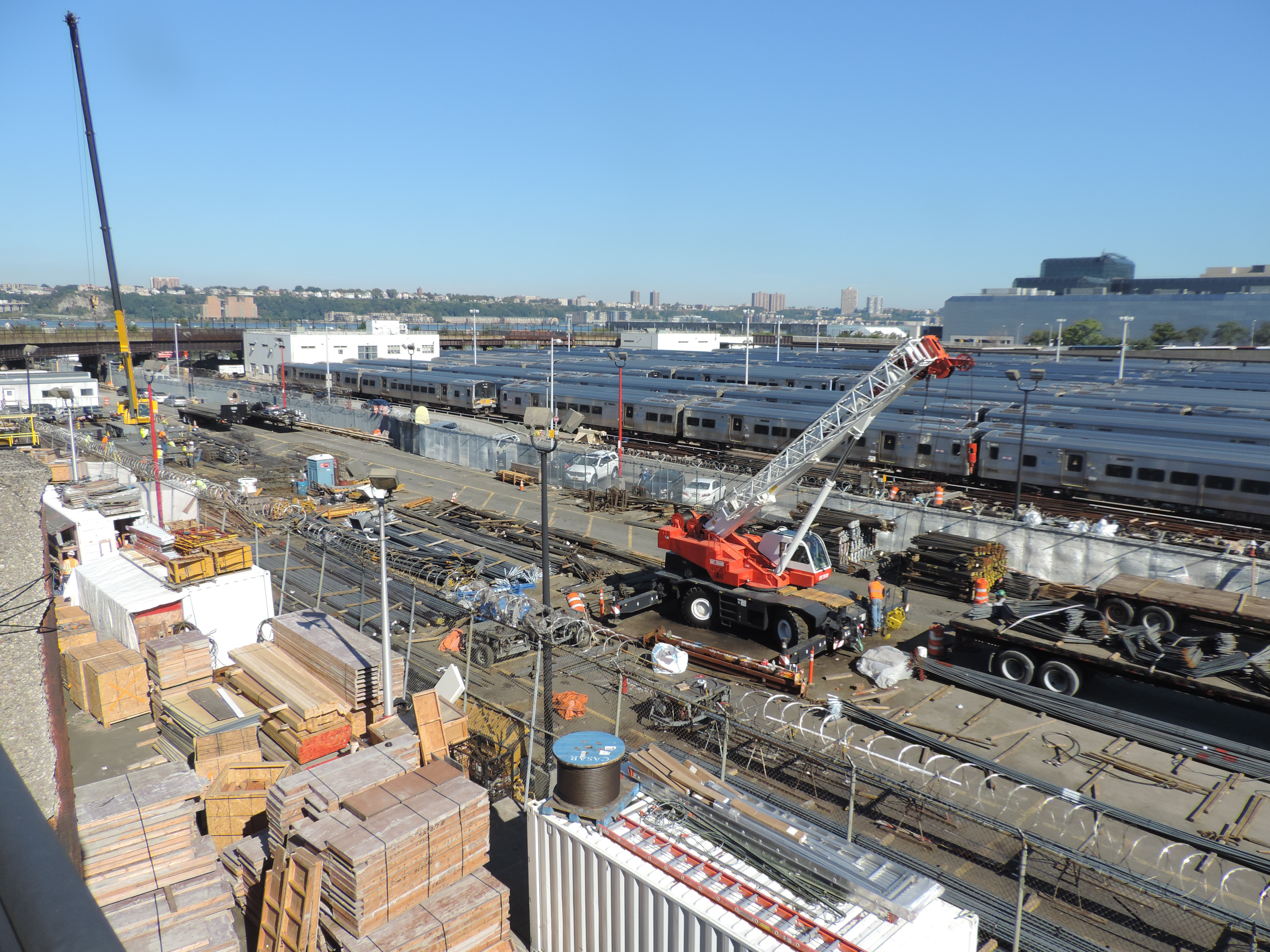
30th Street staging area for construction equipment and materials

The Hudson Yards development is being built by Related Companies on top of a large platform bordered by 10th and 12th Avenues and by 30th and 33rd Streets. Construction on the platform began in 2014. The platform was to be constructed over the existing at-grade West Side Yard, allowing LIRR trains to continue to be stored during midday hours. The land parcel is bordered by 30th Street and Chelsea on the south, Twelfth Avenue on the west, 33rd Street and Hell's Kitchen on the north, and Tenth Avenue on the east. Eleventh Avenue runs through the site, and splits the redevelopment project into two phases. Before Phase 2 was built, an underground concrete casing was built for Amtrak's future Gateway Project under the Hudson River. Construction started in December 2014 and was nearing completion as of July 2017, though funding disputes stalled the tunnel box's completion.

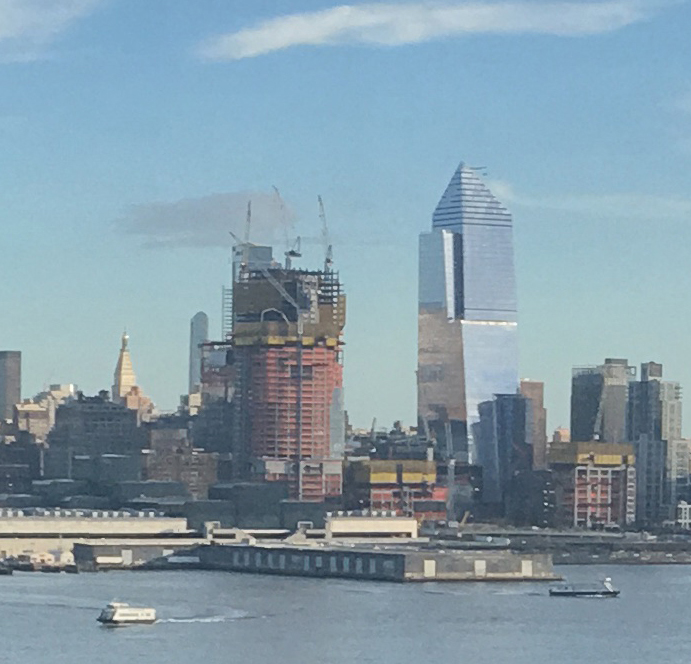
30 Hudson Yards (left, under construction), and 10 Hudson Yards (right, completed) in February 2017

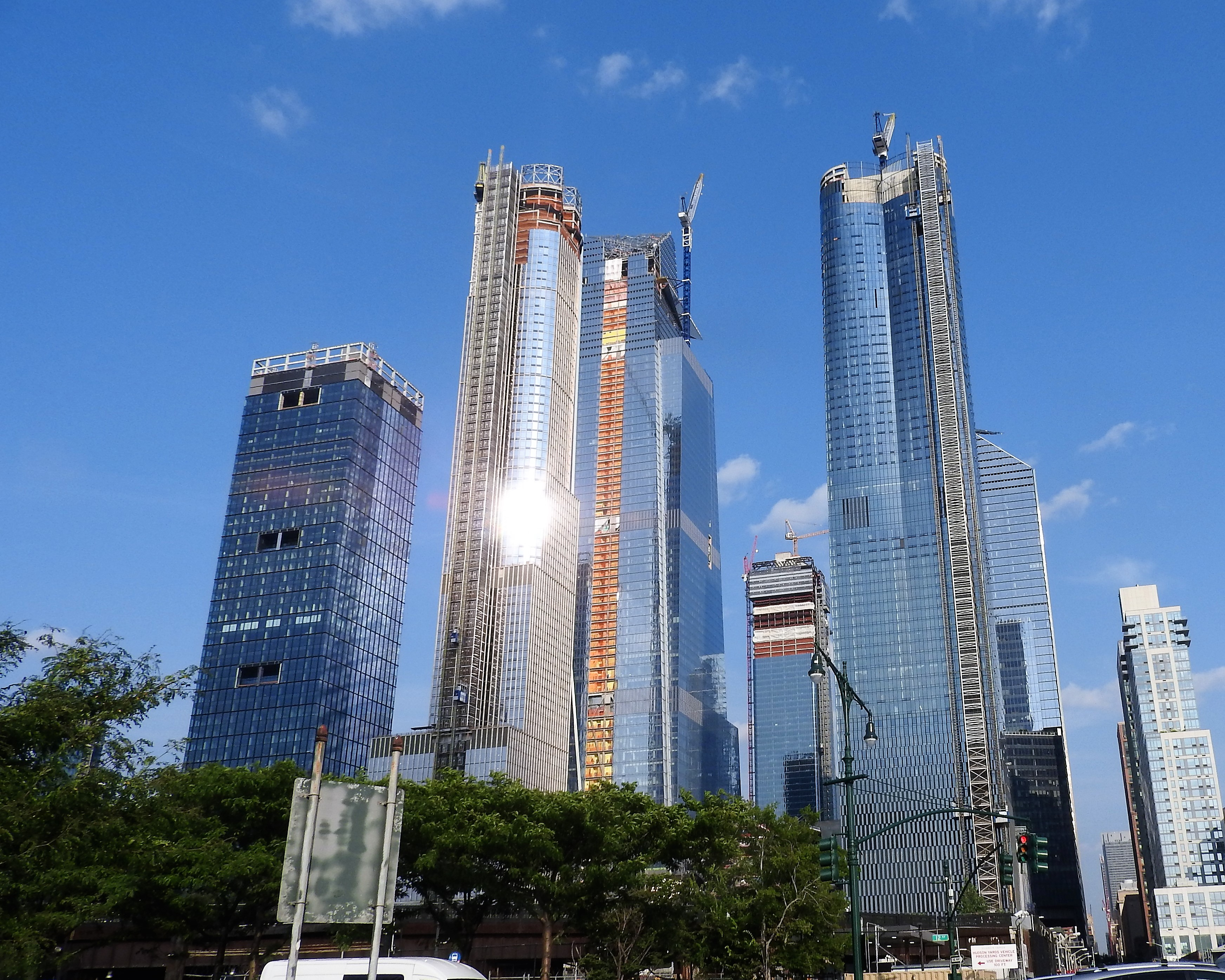
Under construction, 2018

Phase 1, the eastern phase, contains two office towers on Tenth Avenue, plus a retail podium between them. The southern tower is the 52-story, 895 ft (273 m) 10 Hudson Yards, which opened in 2016. The other tower on Tenth Avenue is the 80-story, 1,337 ft (408 m) 30 Hudson Yards, which is the city's seventh-tallest building; it is expected to be completed in early 2019. Bordering Eleventh Avenue are two mixed-use buildings, 15 Hudson Yards and 35 Hudson Yards. 15 Hudson Yards, the more southerly of the two towers, is connected to a semi-permanent structure, a performance and arts space known as The Shed. The mixed-use 15 Hudson Yards was topped out in February 2018. 35 Hudson Yards, a mixed-use skyscraper located to the north of 15 Hudson Yards, was topped out in June 2018. Phase 1 also includes a 7-story mall called Shops & Restaurants of Hudson Yards. Phase 1 opened on March 15, 2019.

The western portion of the yard is bordered by 30th Street and 33rd Street in the north and south, and Eleventh and Twelfth avenues in the east and west. Plans for the western phase of the project originally called for up to seven residential towers, an office building at 33rd Street and Eleventh Avenue tentatively known as "West Tower", and a school serving Pre-K to eighth grade students. Reporting in September 2022 by The New York Times and Bloomberg indicate that Related may build a casino and resort in partnership with Wynn Resorts instead of the originally proposed mixed-use complex. The third phase of the High Line will traverse Phase 2 of the project. Work on the platform to cover the second half of the tracks was originally scheduled to begin in 2018, and reporting in 2014 indicated the entire project, including Phase 2, could be completed by 2024, though work has not begun on the western yard as of late 2022.

The development received mostly negative press when it opened to the public for its failure to integrate into the broader city and its architecture. The complex also suffered due to decreased traffic from commuters and visitors during the COVID-19 pandemic. In May 2020, the Financial Times noted the development had become a "ghost town".

== Nearby development projects ==
=== 50 and 55 Hudson Yards ===
50 and 55 Hudson Yards are located just north of the West Side Yard on the block bounded by 33rd Street to the south, 10th Avenue to the east, 34th Street to the north, and 11th Avenue to the west. 50 Hudson Yards and 55 Hudson Yards are respectively located on the east and west side of the block. Work on the foundation of the 985 ft-tall (300 m) 50 Hudson Yards began in May 2018. The 780 ft-tall (240 m) 55 Hudson Yards started construction on January 22, 2015, and topped out in August 2017.

=== Manhattan West ===
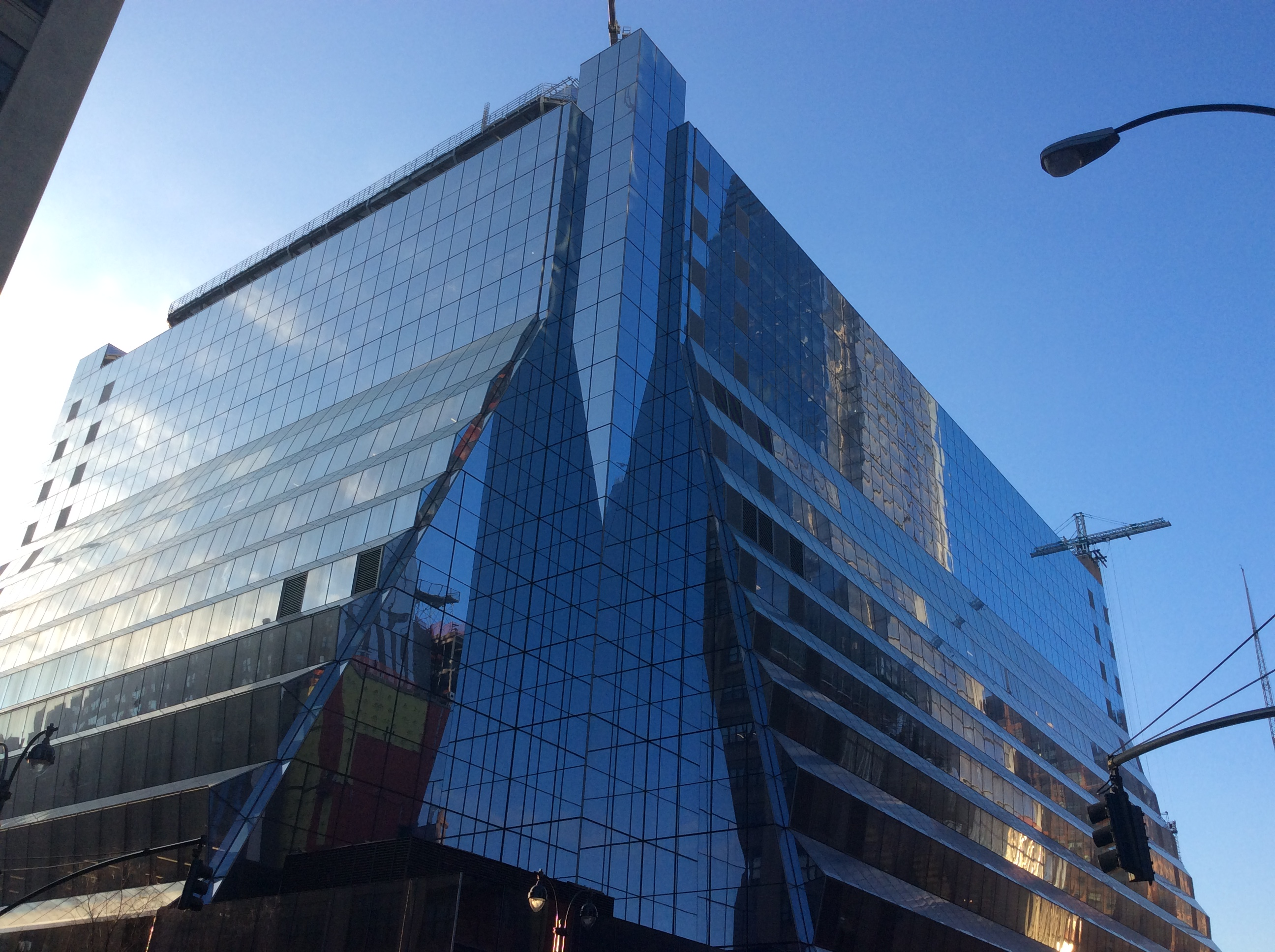
Renovated 450 West 33rd Street building in Manhattan West, home to the Associated Press.

Brookfield, a Canadian asset manager, developed a project that in size is second largest after Hudson Yards. Dubbed "Manhattan West", the complex is a stone's throw away, east of Hudson Yards and includes six buildings, two of which are pre-existing structures undergoing substantial renovations. These buildings include three office buildings, two residential buildings, and one hotel. The two principal office buildings and a public green space, open year-round, were built on a platform over covered tracks that lead from the West Side Yard to Penn Station. To facilitate construction Brookfield announced in 2014 that it would use prefabricated parts to build the platform. Despite its considerable scale, Manhattan West has been referred to as "somewhat eclipsed" and "overshadowed" by the larger Hudson Yards.

The project was mostly completed by 2021, and Brookfield held its grand opening on September 28, 2021. The second of the two office buildings, Two Manhattan West, topped out in 2022. Two Manhattan West is scheduled for completion in 2023.

=== The Spiral ===
In early 2014, real estate firm Massey Knakal announced a conceptual supertall with a 1,220,000 ft^{2} (113,000 m^{2}) capacity and 108 stories that would soar over 1,800 feet on the north side of 34th Street between Hudson Boulevard and Tenth Avenue in order to show the potential of a site that it intended to sell. Dubbed Hudson Spire and designed by MJM+A architects, it would be the tallest tower in the Western Hemisphere if completed. The site was later purchased by Tishman Speyer on April 30, 2014, along with two adjacent properties for a total space of 2,850,000 ft^{2} (265,000 m^{2}).

The plans for The Spire were later replaced with plans designed by Bjarke Ingels Group, dubbed The Spiral. The building started construction in June 2018, and topped-out in January 2021. On October 24, 2023, Bjarke Ingles Group announced the completion of the 66 story tower.

As of October 2023, the tower was 75% leased, with Pfizer, NewYork-Presbyterian Hospital, HSBC, and Baker Tilly as anchor tenants.

=== 3 Hudson Boulevard ===
Among the neighboring projects are 3 Hudson Boulevard (formerly the GiraSole), located on 34th Street and Eleventh Avenue. 3 Hudson Boulevard is under construction, although it lacks an anchor tenant.

Construction was supposed to begin in mid-2014 or 2015, with the building's completion planned for 2017. Completion was rescheduled for 2022. The building, directly across Eleventh Avenue from the Jacob K. Javits Convention Center, would abut the secondary entrance to the new 34th Street – Hudson Yards subway station, built as part of the New York City Subway's 7 Subway Extension project. Consequently, the foundation is being built by the Metropolitan Transportation Authority, because the subway station is directly underneath; the rest of the building is being built by Moinian Group. The foundation works started May 2016. A groundbreaking ceremony was held November 3, 2017.

On June 26, 2014, Joseph Moinian secured a loan for the construction of the building. The firm began "speculative" construction of the project in 2022. As of November 2025, construction on 3 Hudson Boulevard remained stalled.

=== Hudson Yards associated developments ===
Even before the opening of any of the rail yard buildings, many businesses in the area have seen increased profits due to the project's construction. The Hudson Yards redevelopment program catalyzed plans to build new buildings along the future Hudson Boulevard. There has also been a development boom in the vicinity of the rail yard development.

In February 2015, the Chetrit Group, headed by Meyer and Joseph Chetrit, announced that it wanted to spend US$29 million to expand one Hudson Yards development site to 373,068 sq ft (34,659.2 m^{2}). It would add about 200,000 sq ft (19,000 m^{2}) of space to a site between 11th Avenue, 37th and 38th Streets, and Hudson Boulevard that previously allowed 173,000 sq ft (16,100 m^{2}) of retail space. A buyer would be able to split the space between two buildings.

In June 2015, Tishman Speyer bought another lot between West 36th and 37th Streets on 11th Avenue; the lot was zoned for a 735,000 ft^{2} (68,300 m^{2}) residential and hotel property. It is next to a lot—zoned for a planned residential tower—that was bought in 2012 by Lalezarian Properties for $46.5 million, Tishman Speyer's land is also close to a lot owned by former New York Governor Eliot Spitzer, who bought the lot in 2013 and plans at least 414,000 ft^{2} (38,500 m^{2}) of new development space.

Two other new Related buildings, One Hudson Yards and Abington House, are adjacent the Phase 1 buildings, but are unrelated to the Hudson Yards project. Another Related development also on the West Side, originally dubbed "Hudson Residences" is under construction at the same time as Hudson Yards. The project ultimately took the shape of two unrelated buildings: Lantern House, designed by Thomas Heatherwick, and The Cortland, designed by RAMSA. Related is also developing several buildings with Spitzer Enterprises at sites including 451 10th Avenue, 511 West 35th Street, 506 West 36th Street, and 512 West 36th Street.

New York state issued a request for proposals for a site across the streets from the Javits Center at 418 11th Avenue in 2021. The New York Convention Center Development Corporation, a subsidiary of the Empire State Development Corporation, owns the lot, known as "Site K". A proposal for the site by developer Don Peebles, designed by David Adjaye, received attention in 2021 for its design and scope. The request for proposals was withdrawn in late 2021.

== Interpretations and reception ==
=== Urban planning and architecture ===
The Related development Hudson Yards, within the broader Hudson Yards area, has received negative attention for its inability to blend into the city and its architectural character. The Related development has been cited in opposition to other, similar projects.

Justin Davidson, in an article about the Manhattan West's opening for New York, compared the Brookfield development favorably to Related's Hudson Yards, writing that Manhattan West "[...] feels like a corner of New York conceived with actual human beings in mind" while Hudson Yards "[...] has aged from a shiny new space station to a disconsolate one".

=== Restaurants and amenities ===
In a review of the restaurant offerings at Related's Hudson Yards development written in anticipation of the complex opening to the public, Ryan Sutton criticized Related and Oxford for including only two establishments run by women. Further, Sutton criticized Related and Oxford for failing to provide opportunities for small, local operators to open in Hudson Yards, instead leasing to established restaurateurs and organizations which had already experienced "great success". Sutton also criticized the lack of "vibrancy" at the Hudson Yards development, caused by a lack of street-level restaurants. Sutton noted the presence of several chain establishments, such as Sweetgreen and Think Coffee, at street-level in and near the complex, but wrote that "Fast casual isn't known for fostering communal dinnertime bonhomie". In his review, Sutton did express positive anticipation of Mercado Little Spain, a restaurant and food court which had not yet opened in 10 Hudson Yards at the time the piece was published by Eater.

When Mercado Little Spain ultimately opened in 2019, Eater published a mixed review of its offerings written by Robert Sietsema. In a separate review by Sutton of the opened complex, published in 2019, the critic referred to Hudson Yards as "the worst place to eat fancy food in New York". In the 2019 review, which served as an introduction to Eater's individual reviews of restaurants in Hudson Yards, Sutton panned TAK Room, a restaurant by Thomas Keller, but offered praise for Korean restaurant Kawi and Milos Wine Bar. In his full review of TAK Room, Sutton criticized its prices and the discrepancy between the cost of eating at the restaurant and his perception of the quality of the food and service. Pete Wells, in his review of the restaurant, echoed Sutton's criticisms. TAK Room closed in 2020 due to the COVID-19 pandemic.

The Equinox Hotel in Related's development received a positive review from Vanity Fair. Samantha Lewis praised the hotel for its emphasis on providing guests with "blissful slumber". The hotel's restaurant, Electric Lemon, has received an "underwhelming" review from Pete Wells.

In Manhattan West, restaurants including Ci Siamo and Zou Zou's, were given positive reviews by Adam Platt and Ryan Sutton, respectively. Italian Restaurant Legacy Records, located in a new apartment building on West 38th Street, was reviewed favorably by Pete Wells.

== Demographics ==
For census purposes, the New York City government classifies Hudson Yards as part of a larger neighborhood tabulation area called Hudson Yards-Chelsea-Flat Iron-Union Square. Based on data from the 2010 United States census, the population of Hudson Yards-Chelsea-Flat Iron-Union Square was 70,150, a change of 14,311 (20.4%) from the 55,839 counted in 2000. Covering an area of 851.67 acres (344.66 ha), the neighborhood had a population density of 82.4/acre (52,700/sq mi; 20,400/km^{2}). The racial makeup of the neighborhood was 65.1% (45,661) Non-Hispanic White, 5.7% (4,017) African American, 0.1% (93) Native American, 11.8% (8,267) Asian, 0% (21) Pacific Islander, 0.4% (261) from other races, and 2.3% (1,587) from two or more races. Hispanic or Latino residents of any race were 14.6% (10,243) of the population.

== Police and crime ==
Hudson Yards is patrolled by the 10th Precinct of the NYPD, located at 230 West 20th Street. The 10th Precinct ranked 61st safest out of 69 patrol areas for per-capita crime in 2010.

The 10th Precinct has a lower crime rate than in the 1990s, with crimes across all categories having decreased by 74.8% between 1990 and 2018. The precinct reported one murder, 19 rapes, 81 robberies, 103 felony assaults, 78 burglaries, 744 grand larcenies, and 26 grand larcenies auto in 2018.

== Fire safety ==
The Hudson Yards neighborhood is served by the New York City Fire Department (FDNY)'s Engine Co. 34/Ladder Co. 21 at 440 West 38th Street. However, there are no firehouses in or near the Hudson Yards real-estate development.

== Post offices and ZIP Codes ==
Hudson Yards is located within two primary ZIP Codes. The area south of 34th Street is in 10001 and the area north of 34th Street is in 10018. The United States Postal Service operates the RCU Annex Station post office at 340 West 42nd Street. In addition, the James A. Farley Station, the main post office for New York City, is located at 421 8th Avenue.

== List of buildings ==
Below is a list of buildings constructed, planned, or proposed for the broader Hudson Yards neighborhood (from Northwest to Southeast) from 2000 to present:

Street Address	Building Name	Building Use	Construction Started	Completed Date	architectural Height	Height (Stories)	Status	Developer / Architect
650 West 42nd Street	River Place	Residential	1995/1996	1999		40	Completed	Silverstein Properties
635 West 42nd Street	Atelier	Residential		2007		46	Completed	Moinian Group
620 West 42nd Street	Silver Towers	Residential		2009, June	653 ft. (199 m)	60	Completed	Silverstein Properties
605 West 42nd Street	Sky	Residential	2008/2013	2016	656 ft. (200 m)	61	Completed	Moinian Group
520 West 41st Street		Residential			1,100 ft. (335 m)	106	Postponed	Silverstein Properties
350 West 42nd Street	The Orion (skyscraper)	Residential	2004	2006	604 ft (184 m)	58	Completed	CetraRuddy / Extell Development Company
450 West 42nd Street	MiMA (including Yotel)	Residential including Hotel	2007	2011	669 ft. (204 m)	63	Completed	Related / Arquitectonica
555 Tenth Avenue	555Ten	Residential		2016	610 ft.	53	Completed	Extell Development Company / SLCE Architects
550 Tenth Avenue	The Maybury	Residential	2022	2025	520.9 feet (158.8 m)	45	Completed	Gotham Organization
528 West 39th St / 476 Eleventh Avenue		Mixed-Use					In Development	Rockrose
515 West 38th Street	Henry Hall	Residential	2014	2017	361 ft. (110 m)	30	Completed	Imperial Companies / BKSK Architects
470 Eleventh Avenue	Hudson Rise Hotel	Hotel			720.1 feet (219.5 m)	47	In Development/ Litigation	Kuafu Properties and Siras Development
550 West 37th Street		Offices					In Development	Tishman Speyer
541 West 37th Street							In Development	Chetrit Group
505 West 37th Street		Residential	2007	2010	472.1 feet (143.9 m) / 377 feet (115 m)	44	Completed	TF Cornerstone
455 West 37th Street		Residential		2009	294.9 feet (89.9 m)	23	Completed	TF Cornerstone
400 West 37th Street	Hudson Crossing Apartments	Residential		2002		13	Completed	Equity Residential
514 West 36th Street	70 Hudson Yards	Mixed-use	June 2025	Exp late 2028	717 feet (219 m)	47	In development	Gensler and Roger Ferris + Partners; interiors by INC
515 West 36th Street	Hudson 36	Residential		2019		45	Completed	Lalezarian Properties / Ismael Levya Architects
460 Tenth Avenue		Residential				40	In Development	Sherwood Equities
451 Tenth Avenue	The Set	Mixed-Use	2017	2023	587 feet (179 m)	45	Topped Out	Related / Handel Architects
444 Tenth Avenue	Four Points by Sheraton	Hotel		2017		17	Completed	Maddd Equities / Aufgang Architects
445 West 35th Street		Residential	2013	2018		12	Completed	Maddd Equities / Aufgang Architects
411 West 35th Street	The Lewis	Residential	2013	2018		12	Completed	Maddd Equities / Aufgang Architects
555 West 34th Street	3 Hudson Boulevard	Offices	2016	Exp. 2023	1,034 ft. (315 m)	66	Under Construction	Moinian Group / FXFOWLE Architects
550 West 34th Street	55 Hudson Yards	Offices	2015, January	2019, April	780 ft. (240 m)	51	Completed	Related / Kohn Pedersen Fox and Kevin Roche John Dinkeloo and Associates
66 Hudson Boulevard	The Spiral	Offices		2023, October	1,031 ft.	66	Completed	Tishman Speyer / Bjarke Ingels Group
461 West 34th Street	Hudson Yards' Marriott Courtyard Hotel	Hotel		2019, December	312 ft. (95 m)	29	Completed	David Marx
424 Tenth Avenue	50 Hudson Yards	Offices	2017	Exp 2022	985 ft. (300 m)	58	Under Construction	Related / Foster + Partners
35 Hudson Yards; Equinox Tower		Mixed-Use		2019, March	1,000 ft. (300 m)	72	Completed	Related / Kohn Pedersen Fox and David Childs
30 Hudson Yards		Offices	2014, October	2019, March	1,296 ft. (395 m)	92	Completed	Related / Kohn Pedersen Fox
The Shops at Hudson Yards		Retail		2019, March		7	Completed	Related / Kohn Pedersen Fox / Elkus Manfredi Architects
10 Hudson Yards		Offices	2012, December	2016, May	878 ft. (268 m)	52	Completed	Related / Kohn Pedersen Fox
15 Hudson Yards		Residential	2014, December	2019, March	917 ft. (280 m)	88	Completed	Related / Diller Scofidio + Renfro, David Rockwell, and mael Levya Architects
The Shed		Arts Center	2015	2019, April		16	Completed	The Shed / Diller Scofidio + Renfro and David Rockwell
Western Rail Yards	Hudson Yards Phase 2	Residential Towers, Office Building, School, & Retail					In Development	Related
410 Tenth Ave		Offices	1927	2021 (Renovation)		20	Completed	SL Green sold to 601W
NE Manhattan West Complex	1 Manhattan West	Offices		2019, October	995 feet (303 m)	67	Completed	Brookfield / Skidmore, Owings and Merrill
SE Manhattan West Complex	Two Manhattan West	Offices		Exp 2022	994 ft. (303 m)	60	Under Construction	Brookfield / Skidmore, Owings and Merrill
435 West 31st Street	The Eugene	Residential	2014, December	2017, July	730 feet (220 m)	64	Completed	Brookfield / Skidmore, Owings and Merrill
Four Manhattan West	The Pendry	Hotel		2021, September	281 feet (86 m).	21	Completed	Brookfield
450 West 33rd Street	Five Manhattan West	Offices	2014 (renovation)	1969, renovated 2016	262 ft. (79.9 m)	16	Completed	Brookfield / Davis Brody Associates; Renovation: REX
360 Tenth Avenue		Offices					In Development	Frank McCourt / SHoP Architects
312 Eleventh Avenue	Ohm	Residential		2010		34	Completed	Douglaston Development / Stephen B. Jacobs Group
530 West 30th Street	One Hudson Yards	Residential	2015	2017	367 ft.	33	Completed	Related / Davis Brody Bond
500 West 30th Street	Abington House	Residential	2012	2014, April	325 ft. (99 m)	33	Completed	Related / Robert A.M. Stern
529 West 29th Street		Residential (Affordable Artist Housing)		2013		15	Completed	Related / Ismael Leyva Architects

== See also ==
- Javits Center
- Pacific Park, formerly "Atlantic Yards", a similar redevelopment project in Downtown Brooklyn
- List of tallest buildings in New York City
