= Hudson Yards =

Hudson Yards may refer to:

- Hudson Yards, Manhattan, a neighborhood in New York City
  - Hudson Yards (development), a real estate development in the Far West Side of Midtown Manhattan, New York City
  - 34th Street–Hudson Yards station, a subway station in Midtown Manhattan
