= Sky (skyscraper) =

Residential building in Manhattan, New York

Coordinates: 40.7614°N 73.9986°W

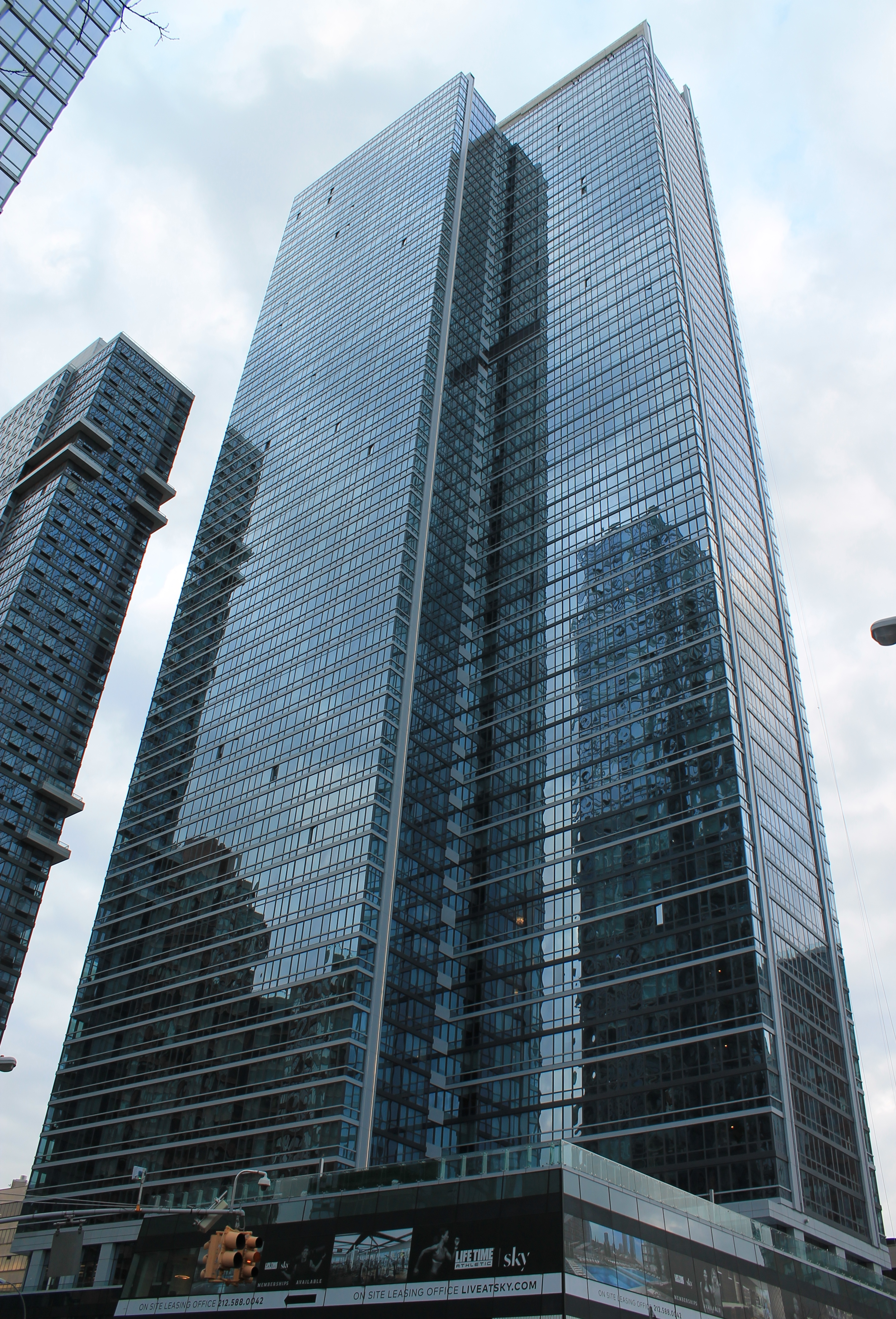
- (March 2017)

General information
- Status: Completed
- Type: Residential
- Completed: 2016

Height
- Roof: 676 ft (206 m)
- Top floor: 70

Technical details
- Floor count: 70
- Lifts/elevators: 13

Design and construction
- Architect: Goldstein, Hill & West Architects
- Developer: Moinian Group
- Structural engineer: WSP

Sky, also known as 605 West 42nd Street, is a mixed-use building at 42nd Street and 11th Avenue in the Hudson Yards neighborhood of Manhattan in New York City. Developed by the Moinian Group, the 70-story tower contains luxury rental residences designed by the Rockwell Group, ranging from studios to two bedrooms and includes the Vue Penthouse Collection. Sky features over 70,000 square feet of amenity space, mostly operated by Life Time Fitness, which includes a multi-level gym, water club and LifeSpa, lap pool, professional size basketball court (designed by Carmelo Anthony), two outdoor zero edge pools, and an outdoor park. The building also contains retail space, in part, occupied by the Manhattan Volvo car dealership. It was designed by Goldstein, Hill & West Architects, and at 676 feet (206 m), it is the 92nd tallest building in New York.

== History and construction ==
The Moinian Group purchased the site in 2005. It originally held a gas station and a parking facility. The project first broke ground in 2008, but construction was stalled due to the recession from 2009 until 2012, and the project was dubbed, like several nearby developments, a "zombie project" because Moinan retained ownership of the site but did not continue development. Activity resumed with a redesign by David Rockwell, replacing the original by Costas Kondylis. Construction began again in 2013, and was completed in 2016. Tishman Realty & Construction was the firm responsible for the construction of the building.

In 2015, residents of neighboring building Atelier filed suit against Moinian because access to their pool and other amenities had been blocked off and were now only accessible by walking outside and going into the Sky building's Sky House. They claim they were promised reciprocal access to all of Sky's amenities, which have yet to occur.

The building of Sky cost approximately $850 million. SL Green owns a minority stake in the building.

In 2020, Sky received criticism by local publication W42st for staff cuts that resulted in garbage pile ups, long wait times for maintenance, and security issues. One resident is quoted as saying "Management is jeopardizing tenant safety. Homeless men have tried to attack tenants, steal packages, and sleep in our building stairwell. The layoffs exacerbated an already weak security system, while making living conditions intolerable. Garbage piles up in trash rooms, while routine maintenance takes weeks."

== Usage ==
Sky has the most rentals of any building in any borough of New York, with 1,175 units. The top few floors contain the penthouses. The basketball court has attracted many athletes to the building. Notable residents have included Nina Agdal, former New York Knicks' starting players, Kristaps Porzingis and Sasha Vujačić, along with others.

== Art ==
Sky features art from artists such as Yayoi Kusama and Günther Förg. A Kusama bronze pumpkin stands tall in the center of the Infinity Loop Motor Court, while two "Infinite Net” pieces hang above the fireplaces in the lobby. Kusama's bronze pumpkins were exhibited in London at Victoria Miro in 2014 for the first time and along with her other artwork, they have also been displayed in several countries. Six "Lead Paintings" from Förg line the wall adjacent to the mail gallery. In June 2017, SKY ART NY opened. SKY ART is a temporary nonprofit art center created to present the exhibition Ugo Rondinone: I <3 John Giorno, produced by Frahm & Frahm and Moinian Group.

As of February 2018, the space formerly hosting SKY ART has been marketed for retail occupancy.

== See also ==
- List of tallest buildings in New York City
