= 520 West 41st Street =

Proposed skyscraper in Manhattan, New York

General information
- Status: Never built
- Type: Hotel, residential
- Location: Midtown Manhattan, New York City, United States

Height
- Roof: 1,100 ft (335 m)

Technical details
- Floor count: 106
- Floor area: 1,685,000 sq ft (156,500 m^{2})

520 West 41st Street was a proposed 106-story supertall skyscraper in Hudson Yards, Manhattan, New York City, near Midtown Manhattan. The building would have surpassed all other skyscrapers on the island by floor-count. Upon completion, it would either have been the fifth or sixth tallest building in New York City.

== History ==
The development was one of many allowed by rezoning of the Special Hudson Yards District in 2005. Other projects include the Hudson Yards redevelopment by Related.

Early reports indicated the site would host two distinct towers of differing heights. Later, the plans for the site were changed to two sixty-story towers connected horizontally at the roof, designed by Oppenheimer Architecture. Current plans, first released in July 2014, call for a single tower. Silverstein reportedly paid $100 million for the construction site, and entered into contract with a Mercedes-Benz dealership, then the owner, in 2011. As of July 2015, work appears to have begun on the project site, with the dealership undergoing demolition. However, despite the activity at the site, no plans for the building have been filed with the city.

Construction was tentatively scheduled to begin in 2017, and was expected to conclude in 2020. Although the development neighbors other structures such as the Silver Towers and Sky, the building faced some opposition from residents in the community, who requested the building's height be reduced.

New plans were filed for the site in 2017. The new plans include a residential tower and a commercial tower, with a total of 1.6 million square feet between the two.

== Usage ==
The building will include 300,000 square feet (28,000 m^{2}) of ground-level retail space, 175,000 square feet (16,300 m^{2}) of office space. It will also include hotel rooms and 1400 apartments. Of the 1400 planned apartments, 280 will be designated as affordable. If completed as planned, the building will contain more apartments than all other super tall buildings in New York City combined, as most super tall developments, such as One57, 111 West 57th Street, and 432 Park Avenue, tend to contain relatively few expensive apartments.

== See also ==
- List of tallest buildings in New York City
