= 3 Hudson Boulevard =

Under-construction skyscraper in Manhattan, New York

Coordinates: 40.755916°N 74.001258°W

- Interactive map of the 3 Hudson Boulevard area
- Former names: GiraSole

General information
- Status: On hold
- Type: Mixed-use, office and residential
- Location: 555 West 34th Street, Manhattan, New York 10001
- Construction started: 2017
- Estimated completion: Unknown

Height
- Roof: 987 ft (301 m)

Technical details
- Floor count: 56
- Floor area: 2,000,000 sq ft (190,000 m^{2})

Design and construction
- Architect: FXFOWLE Architects
- Developer: Joseph Moinian and Boston Properties

3 Hudson Boulevard (previously known as GiraSole) is a proposed skyscraper along the Hudson Park and Boulevard in the Hudson Yards and Hell's Kitchen neighborhoods of Manhattan, New York City, United States. Construction on the skyscraper is in progress, but has currently been paused. The project's developer is Joseph Moinian.

== History and development ==
FXCollaborative (formerly FXFowle) designed the building, which is planned to have 2 million square feet (190,000 m^{2}). There will be 50,000 square feet (4,600 m^{2}) on each of the lower stories and 30,000 to 37,000 square feet (2,800 to 3,400 m^{2}) on each of the upper stories..

Construction was supposed to begin in 2015, with the building's completion planned for 2017. The building, directly across Eleventh Avenue from the Jacob K. Javits Convention Center, would abut the secondary entrance to the new 34th Street – Hudson Yards subway station, built as part of the New York City Subway's 7 Subway Extension project. Consequently, the foundation was built by the Metropolitan Transportation Authority because the subway station is directly underneath; the rest of the building would be built by Moinian Group. The foundation works started May 2016.

On June 26, 2014, Joseph Moinian secured a loan for the construction of the building. A groundbreaking ceremony for 3 Hudson Boulevard occurred in November 2017, at which point the planned building's height was reduced to 940 feet (290 m). In addition, Joseph Moinian sought $3 billion in debt and equity to fund the tower. In 2018, Boston Properties (later BXP, Inc.) became a partner in 3 Hudson Boulevard's development, giving Moinian an $80 million loan to help finance the construction. By 2020, the building was planned to cost $2.58 billion.

In an interview with Commercial Observer, Ted Koltis of The Moinian Group said the firm had begun "speculative" construction of the project in early 2022. However, in late 2022 New York YIMBY reported that construction on the building was on hold. BXP's loan on the building had matured by January 2025, prompting BXP and Moinian to seek another construction loan. In October 2025, developers secured a $108 million loan from JPMorgan Chase. However, construction remained stalled.

== Energy efficiency ==
The developers of the building are hoping to get a LEED Platinum certification for the building when it is completed, owing to its eco-friendly design. "Green" strategies include wind harvesting, rooftop farming, heat recovery, solar shading, photovoltaic electricity, regenerative elevators, Energy Star-efficient appliances, ice storage, and natural lighting.

== See also ==
- List of tallest buildings in New York City
