= Hudson Boulevard =

Street and park in Manhattan, New York

Bella Abzug Park Hudson Boulevard
- Hudson Park
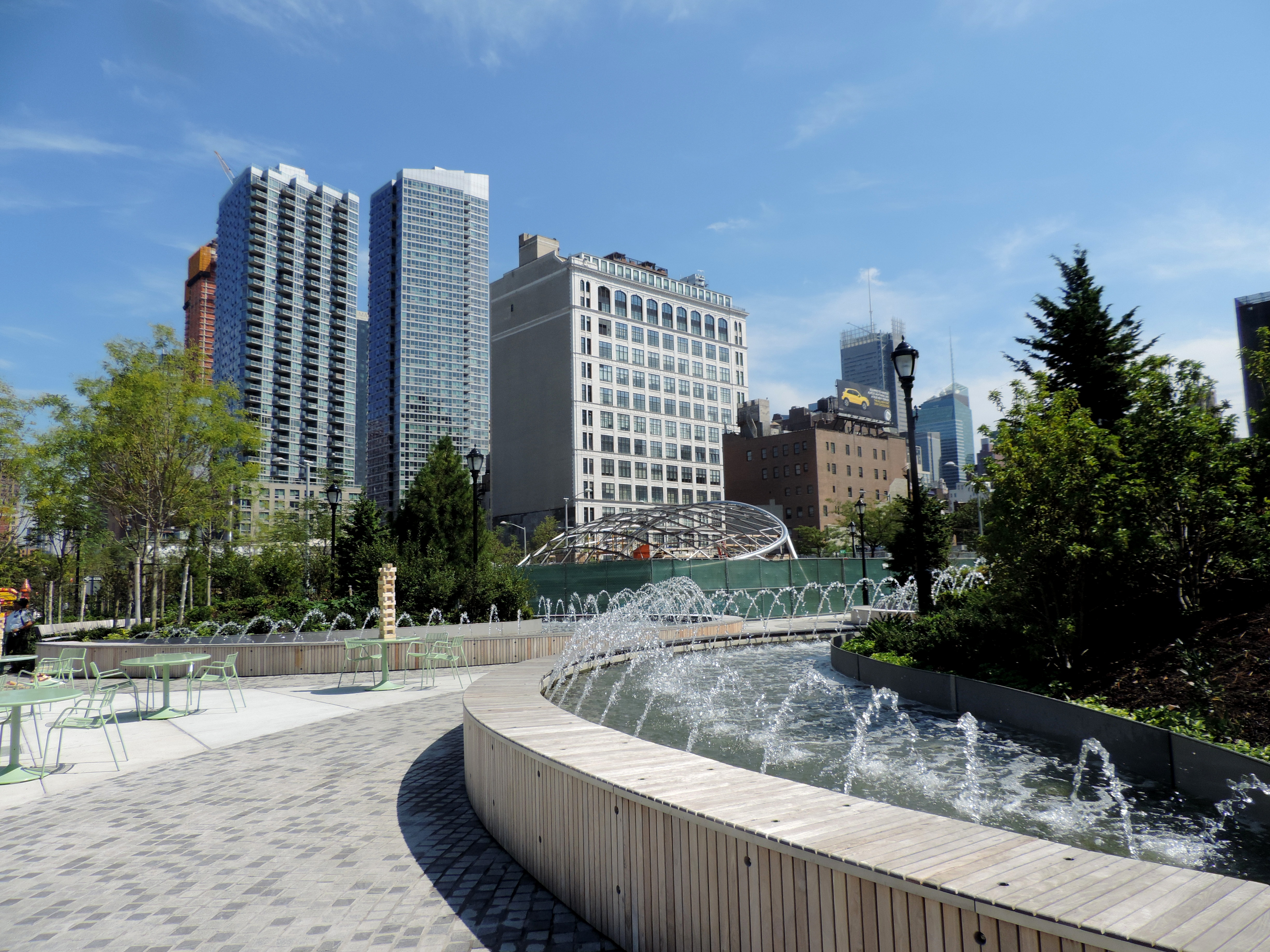
- Hudson Park, between 34th Street and 35th Street
- Maintained by: Hudson Yards / Hell's Kitchen Alliance
- Length: 1,200 ft (370 m)
- Location: Manhattan, New York City
- Postal code: 10001, 10018
- North end: 36th Street (phase 1); 39th Street (phase 2a); 42nd Street (phase 2b)
- South end: 33rd Street
- East: Tenth Avenue
- West: Eleventh Avenue

Construction
- Commissioned: 2014; 12 years ago
- Construction start: 2007 (phase 1) late 2020 (phase 2)
- Completion: Late 2014 (phase 1); 2023 (phase 2)

Hudson Park and Boulevard is a greenway and boulevard in Hell's Kitchen, Manhattan in New York City, being built as part of the Hudson Yards Redevelopment Project. It lies between 10th and 11th Avenues. The park, officially called Bella Abzug Park, is located in the median of the boulevard, which consists of two one-way roads that run parallel to each other.

When complete, it will be 4 acres (1.6 ha) in area, six blocks long, and run north–south between 33rd and 39th Streets. The boulevard will be in the center of the park when complete. Construction will be in two phases; the first phase, located between 33rd and 36th Streets, was under construction from 2012 to August 2015. The construction of the section between 36th and 37th Streets is underway as of summer 2021. The second phase has no timeline. The total cost of the project is more than $30 million.

== History ==
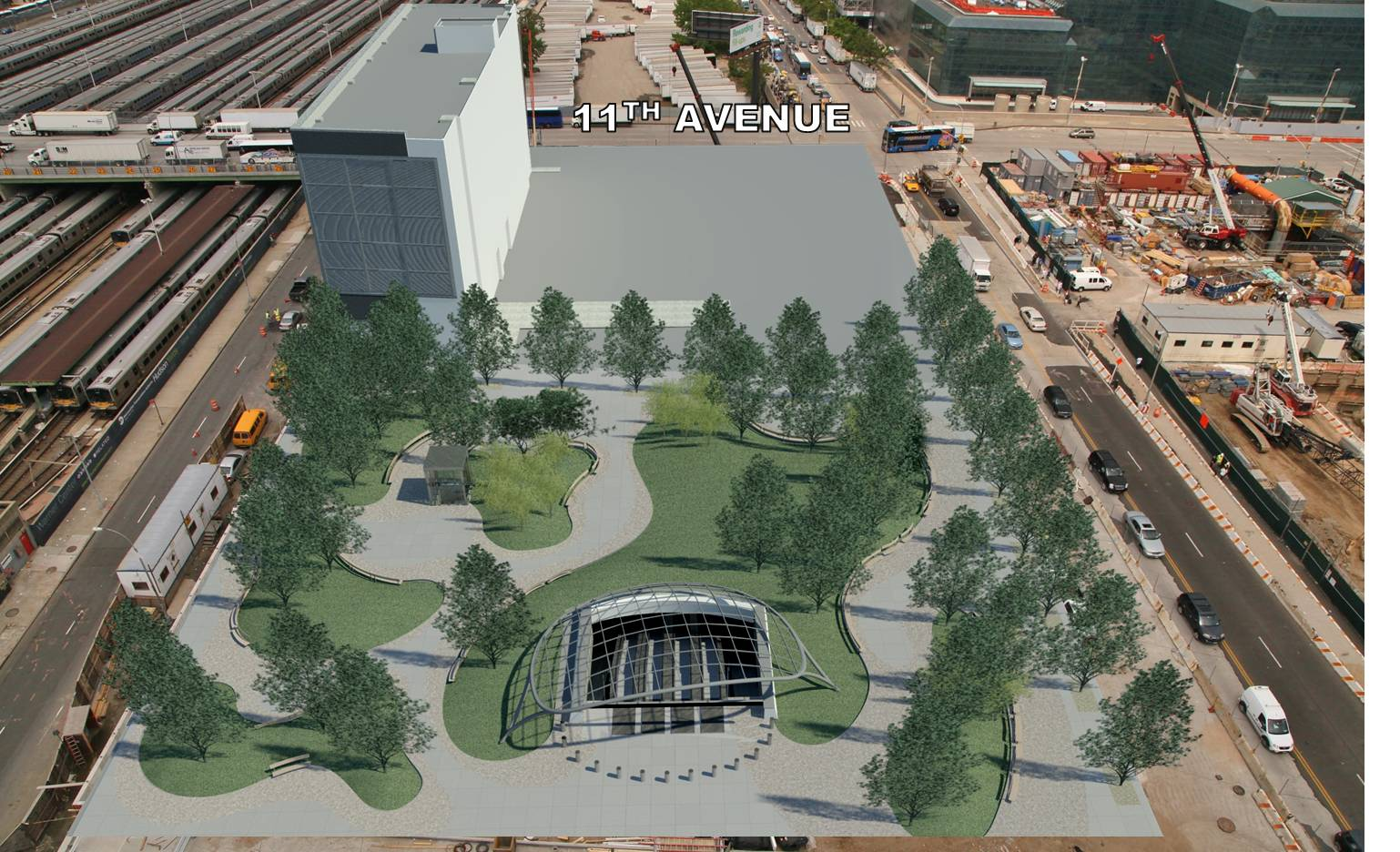
MTA depiction of the 33rd and 34th Streets block of the park and boulevard, with subway entrance and buildings included

In the 1930s, there was a proposal to build a street in the middle of the block between 10th and 11th Avenues, running from 34th to 42nd Streets within roughly the same place as the current Hudson Boulevard. It would have fed into the Lincoln Tunnel. One block of the street was actually built between 40th and 41st Streets. The road was named Galvin Avenue, after Port Authority of New York and New Jersey chair John F. Galvin, and was labeled as such through the 1980s. This name was still in use as recently as 2017, although there are no street signs for it.

In January 2005, the New York City Council approved the rezoning of about 60 blocks from 28th to 43rd Streets, creating the neighborhood of Hudson Yards; the need for a park in the area was seen when Hudson Yards was being planned.

The park and boulevard was developed concurrently with the New York City Subway's 7 Subway Extension to 34th Street. The park contains the two entrances to the 34th Street station. The first entrance is located between 33rd and 34th streets, and a second entrance is between 34th and 35th streets.

Phase one of the park's layout, led by Michael Van Valkenburgh Associates, was finished in January 2012. Construction began in January 2012. Since the boulevard was brand-new, it would conform to New York City Department of Transportation standards set in 2012. A traffic signal was installed at 34th Street to facilitate pedestrian flow through the park.

A business improvement district for the park, started in early 2014, is being led by Robert J. Benfatto Jr., of Manhattan Community Board 4. The BID has a $1.2 million budget in its first year, which will go up to $3 million in subsequent years. Its budget is used for Hudson Park maintenance and operations, district-wide services and improvements, administration and advocacy.

As of August 2014, the section of the park between 33rd and 34th Streets was completed, and was to open at the end of 2014. However, the section between 34th and 36th Streets was delayed to August 2015, while the 33rd to 34th Streets section did not open until the 34th Street station opened on September 13, 2015.

On March 1, 2019, the New York City Department of Parks and Recreation announced that Hudson Park was to be renamed in honor of Bella Abzug, a New York representative and one of the leading endorsers of the second-wave feminism movement. This was part of an effort by Bill de Blasio's association's plan to recognize female New Yorkers during Women's History Month.

== Description ==
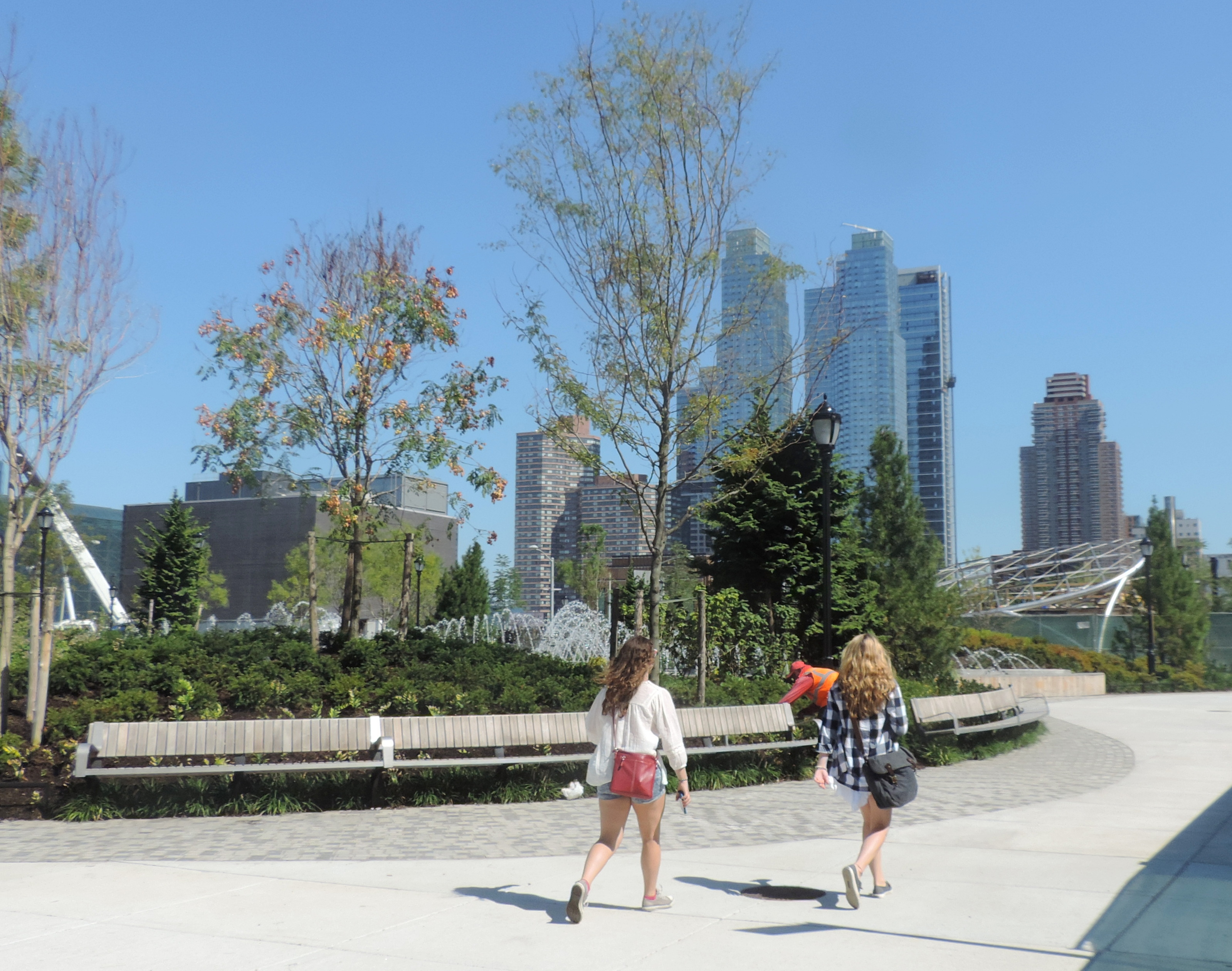
Phase 1 of the park, which was opened in July 2015

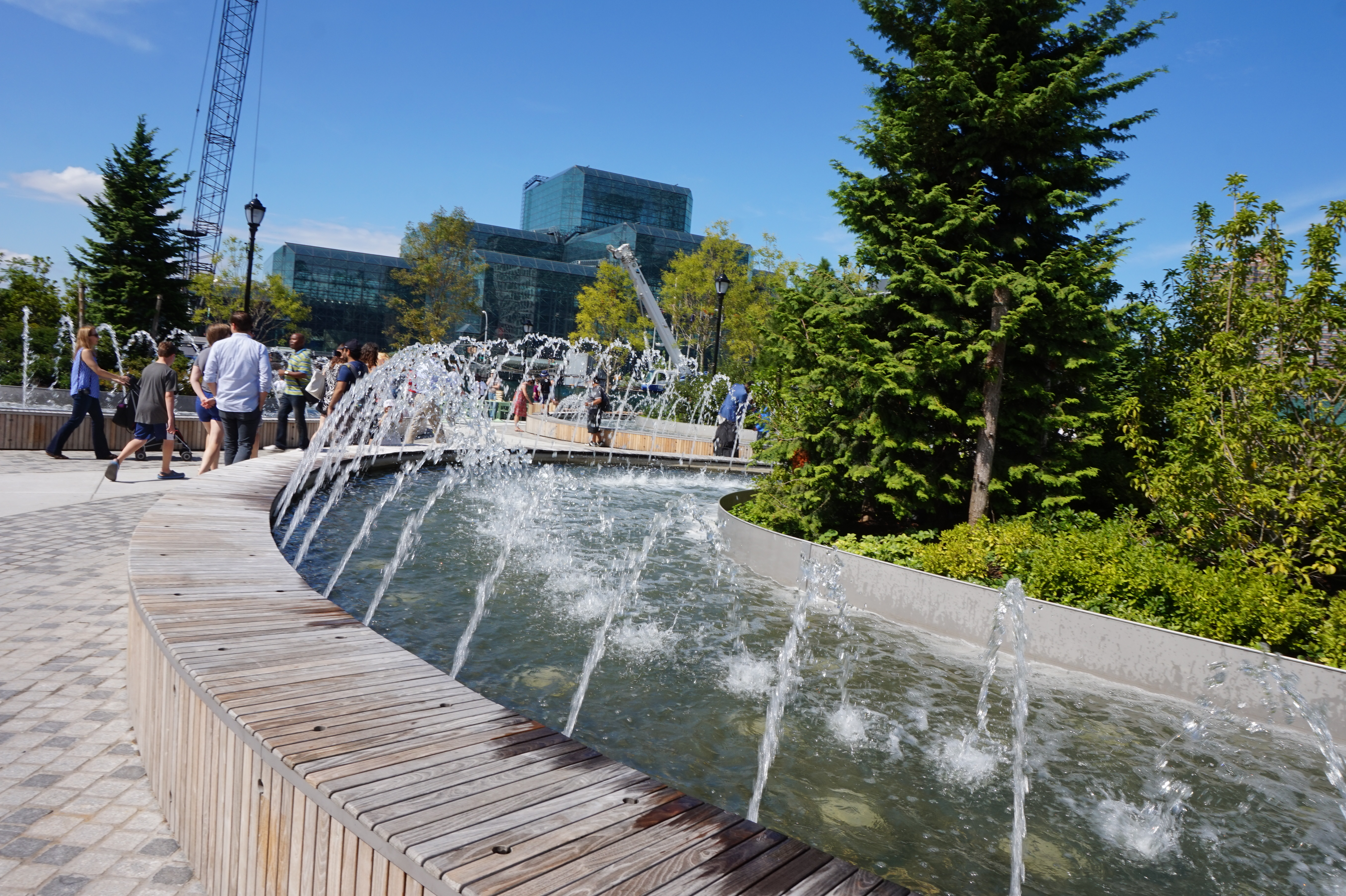
Fountains in the park

The boulevard is split into two, with a Hudson Boulevard East and a Hudson Boulevard West. The park serves as a median. The boulevard starts from a restricted driveway (extending from 31st Street westbound) at 33rd Street and is one-way northbound to 35th Street, with the park to the west of the roadway. North of 35th Street, a southbound roadway forms and the park is located between the two roadways up to 36th Street. Future plans call for the park to be extended up to 39th Street (although the western roadway ends at 38th Street, the eastern roadway and the park go up to 39th Street). Then, a High Line-style promenade above the Lincoln Tunnel entrance will be constructed in the second phase to connect the greenway to 42nd Street. The boulevard's southern end is integrated with the Hudson Yards Public Square, an L-shaped public square that is intended to be Hudson Yards' centerpiece.

The first phase of the park and boulevard has lawns, a fountain, a café, wooden benches, planting beds, and a playground. Three fountains between 34th and 35th Street are able to detect wind speeds and shut off during high winds. A 50-foot-high pole designed by James Carpenter between 35th and 36th Streets was built as a café location. Additionally, the Amtrak Empire Connection will run underneath the park. The park will be owned by the city. It, along with the High Line, Hudson Yards public square, and Hudson River Park, will create a pedestrian-friendly greenway. The first phase and part of the second phase of Hudson Boulevard West is already completed.

The boulevard is bordered on the west and east between 33rd and 34th Streets by the locations of 55 Hudson Yards and 50 Hudson Yards, respectively. The current 55 Hudson Yards building was previously occupied by a subway ventilation building, with a facade containing a U.S. flag pattern on the side of the building facing the park and boulevard. On April 30, 2014, Tishman Speyer announced the acquisition of land between the Hudson Park & Boulevard and Tenth Avenue, between 34th and 35th Streets; which would be razed to make way for a "Hudson Spire", originally planned to be the tallest building in America with a potential height of over 1,800 feet (549 m) and 108 stories. The Hudson Spire eventually became The Spiral building, containing the world headquarters of Pfizer as well as the U.S. headquarters of HSBC Bank.

Although the boulevard is six blocks long, the 30-foot-wide (9.1 m) park extends as a non-vehicular greenway north to 42nd Street via a pedestrian bridge, and through the Hudson Yards development south to 30th Street and connecting with the High Line.

One side of the park is to be commercial and the other side residential.

== Notable sites along the boulevard ==
- 3 Hudson Boulevard, planned building
- 34th Street, subway station, serving the 7 and <7> trains
- 50 Hudson Yards, building
- 55 Hudson Yards, building
- The Spiral, building
