= The Spiral (New York City) =

Skyscraper in Manhattan, New York

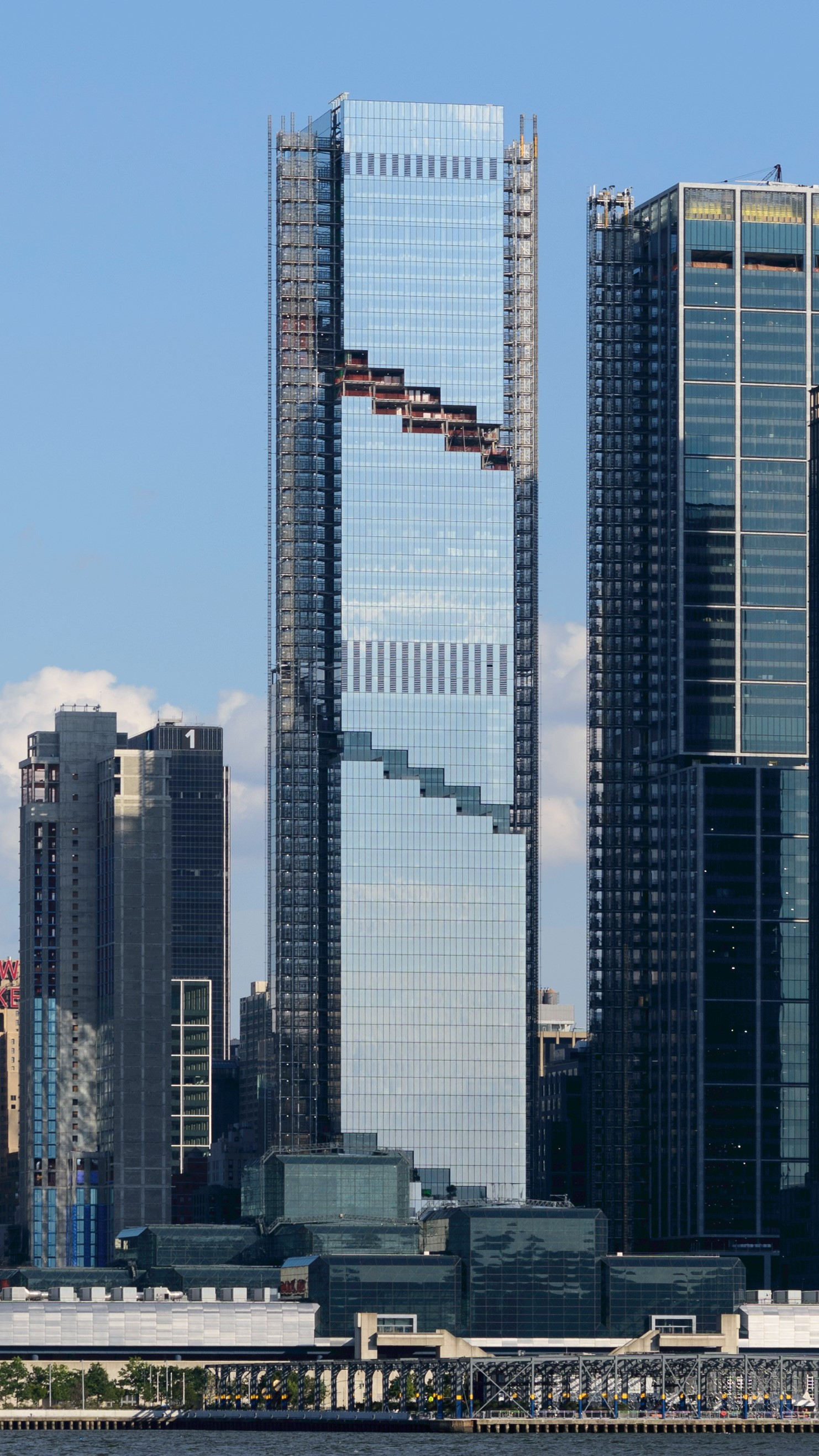
- The Spiral under construction in September 2021
- Interactive map of the The Spiral area
- Former names: Hudson Spire, 509 West 34th Street

General information
- Status: Completed
- Type: Commercial
- Architectural style: Postmodern
- Location: 66 Hudson Boulevard, Manhattan, New York
- Coordinates: 40.75533°N 73.999568°W
- Construction started: 2018; 8 years ago
- Topped-out: January 2021; 5 years ago
- Opened: 2023; 3 years ago

Height
- Roof: 1,031 feet (314 m)

Technical details
- Floor count: 66
- Floor area: 2,850,000 square feet (265,000 m^{2})

Design and construction
- Architects: Bjarke Ingels Group, AAI Architects, P.C. (as architect of record)
- Developer: Tishman Speyer
- Main contractor: Turner Construction

Website
- www.thespiralny.com

The Spiral, also known as 66 Hudson Boulevard, is a 66-floor, 1,031-foot (314 m) skyscraper with 2.85 million square feet (265,000 m^{2}), on 34th Street between Hudson Boulevard and Tenth Avenue in Hudson Yards, Manhattan, New York City. It was developed by Tishman Speyer, constructed by Turner Construction, and opened in 2023.

The building got its name as each floor has outdoor gardens that spiral around the facade of the building in a continuous green pathway. It was designed by Bjarke Ingels Group, which also designed the nearby West 57. Space Copenhagen provided interior design services. The building includes a clubhouse and an open-air terrace with panoramic city views on the 66th floor, along with a lounge. The building has an irrigation system provided by Bosch that is designed to save 4.5 million gallons of water per year compared to other systems.

== History ==
The tower was conceptualized in 2014 as the Hudson Spire, with a 1,800-foot (550 m) roof height and a 2,000-foot (610 m) architectural height. It was marketed as the tallest building in the Western Hemisphere. Tishman Speyer spent $438 million acquiring the site. In late 2015, Tishman Speyer paid $25 million to two men who lived in a four-story building on the site, to get them to relocate. While Tishman had prevailed in court, the tenants threatened to delay the development by five years via additional court cases.

Plans for the building were filed in September 2016. In April 2018, a mortgage real estate investment trust managed by Blackstone Inc. provided a $1.8 billion construction loan. The building topped-out in January 2021. In March 2023, the building won the CoStar Impact Award for best commercial development in the New York City region. Tishman Speyer sought to refinance the building in late 2024 with a $3 billion loan, and in January 2025 was awarded a $2.85 billion fixed-rate loan with a five-year repayment period.

== Tenants ==
Tenants include:

- Base: a restaurant run by Erik Ramirez and Juan Correa, known for the Llama group of restaurants
- Floor 2: NewYork-Presbyterian Hospital - Och Spine Center
- Floors 3–5: HSBC
- Floors 7–21: Pfizer
- Floor 22: Baker Tilly
- Floor 23: NCC-group PLC
- Floor 24: Essensys
- Floors 25–28: AllianceBernstein
- Floor 28: ProShares, SEB Group
- Floors 32–33: Marshall Wace
- Floors 35–36: Turner Construction
- Floors 40–52: Debevoise & Plimpton

== See also ==
- List of tallest buildings in New York City
