= M12 (New York City bus) =

Bus route on Manhattan's West Side

m12
- Eleventh and Twelfth Avenue Line
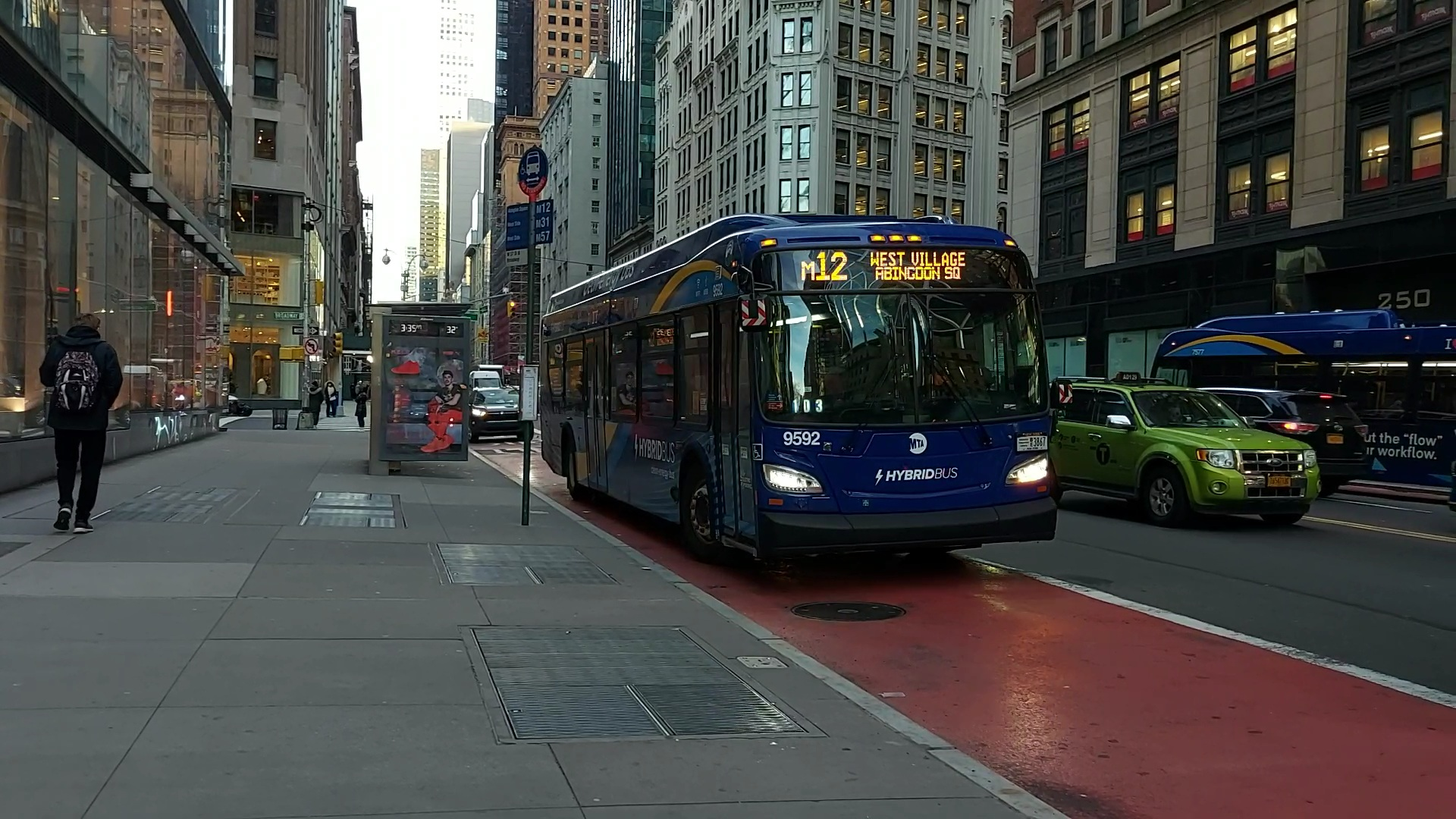
- A 2021 XDE40 (9592) on the Abingdon Square-bound M12

Overview
- System: MTA Regional Bus Operations
- Operator: Manhattan and Bronx Surface Transit Operating Authority
- Garage: Michael J. Quill Depot
- Vehicle: New Flyer Xcelsior XD40; New Flyer Xcelsior XE40; Nova Bus LFS HEV
- Began service: August 31, 2014

Route
- Locale: Manhattan, New York, U.S.
- Communities served: Hell’s Kitchen, Hudson Yards, Chelsea, West Village
- Start: West Midtown – 58 St and Broadway
- Via: Eleventh Avenue (southbound); Twelfth Avenue (northbound)
- End: Abingdon Square
- Length: 3.4 miles (5.5 km)

Service
- Frequency: Every 30 minutes
- Operates: 6:45 AM-10:45 PM
- Annual patronage: 392,196 (2025)
- Transfers: Yes
- Timetable: M12

The M12 bus route constitutes a public transit line in Manhattan, New York City. The M12 operates between Columbus Circle and Abingdon Square, serving Manhattan's West Side. It uses 11th and 12th Avenues between 14th and 57th Streets. It was introduced in 2014 to provide better service to the far west side.

== Current route ==
The M12 bus route begins at Abingdon Square in the West Village, and heads northbound on 8th Ave before turning left on 14th Street. Northbound buses use 15th Street to access 12th Avenue, whereas southbound buses use 18th Street and 9th Avenue. At 24th Street, the two directions split, with northbound buses using 12th Avenue and southbound buses using 11th Avenue. Passengers can transfer to the 7 train at 34th Street - Hudson Yards. This arrangement continues until 57th Street, where the M12 goes crosstown to 8th Avenue. It then terminates at 58th Street and Broadway, where passengers can connect to the 1, A, B, C, and D subways at 59th Street–Columbus Circle station.

== History ==
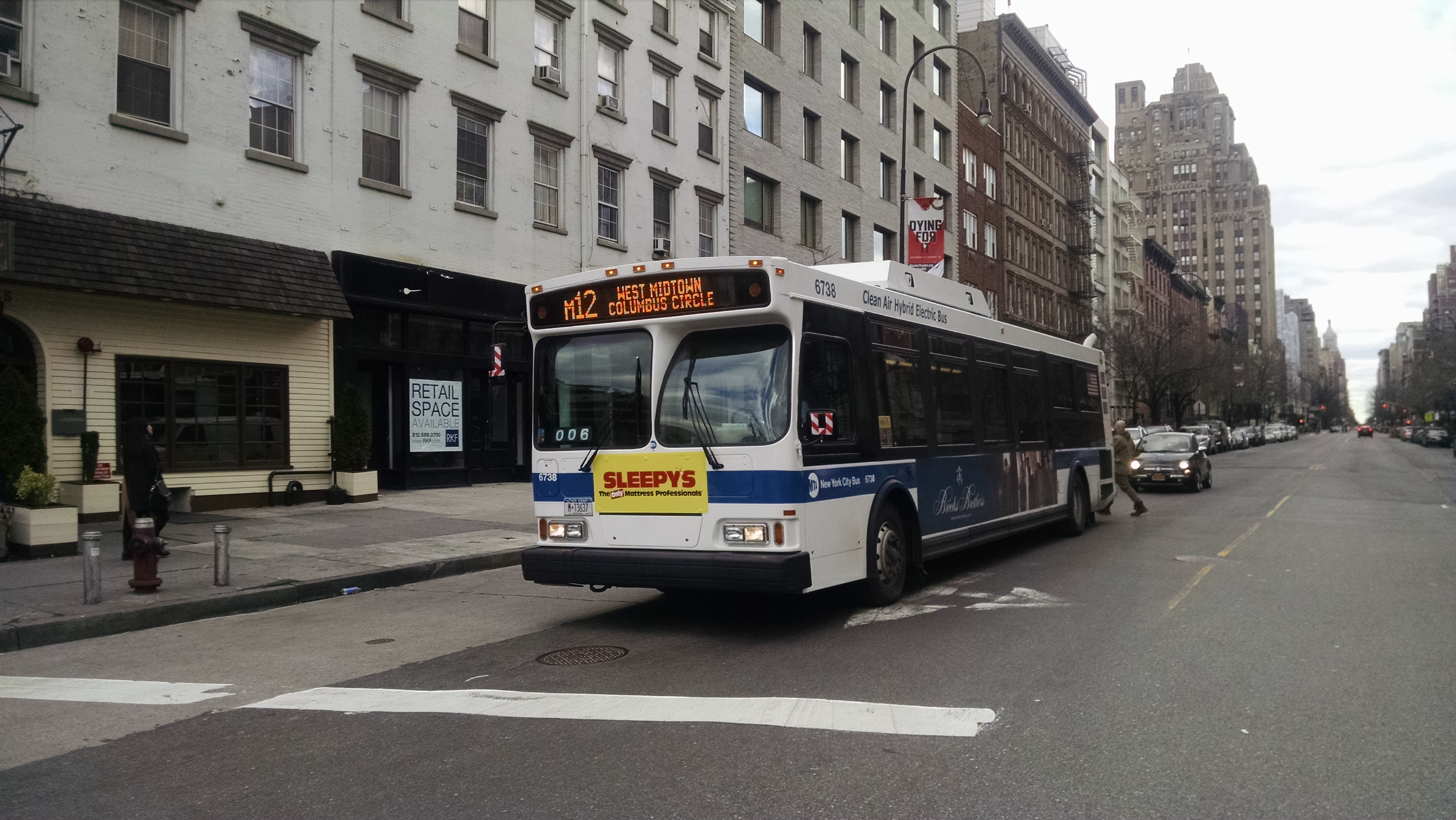
A 2006 Orion VII OG HEV (6738) on the Columbus Circle-bound M12

The MTA started planning for a far west side service in 2013, in conjunction with the 7 train's extension to 34 Street - Hudson Yards. It originally was planned to go from 59th Street to Spring Street, via the West Side Highway until 14th Street, and Washington/Greenwich Streets south of there. It was also scheduled to only run every 30 minutes. After numerous complaints by the community boards in the area, the route was redrawn in 2014. This routing was revised one more time to its current state before the start of service on August 31, 2014.

== Equipment ==
The M12 operates out of Michael J. Quill Depot, using NovaBus LFS HEV, New Flyer XE40s, and New Flyer XD40 Xcelsior buses. Prior to 2019, the route operated Nova Bus RTS-06 buses, but these were replaced by the XD40s.
