= One Hudson Yards =

Residential skyscraper in Manhattan, New York

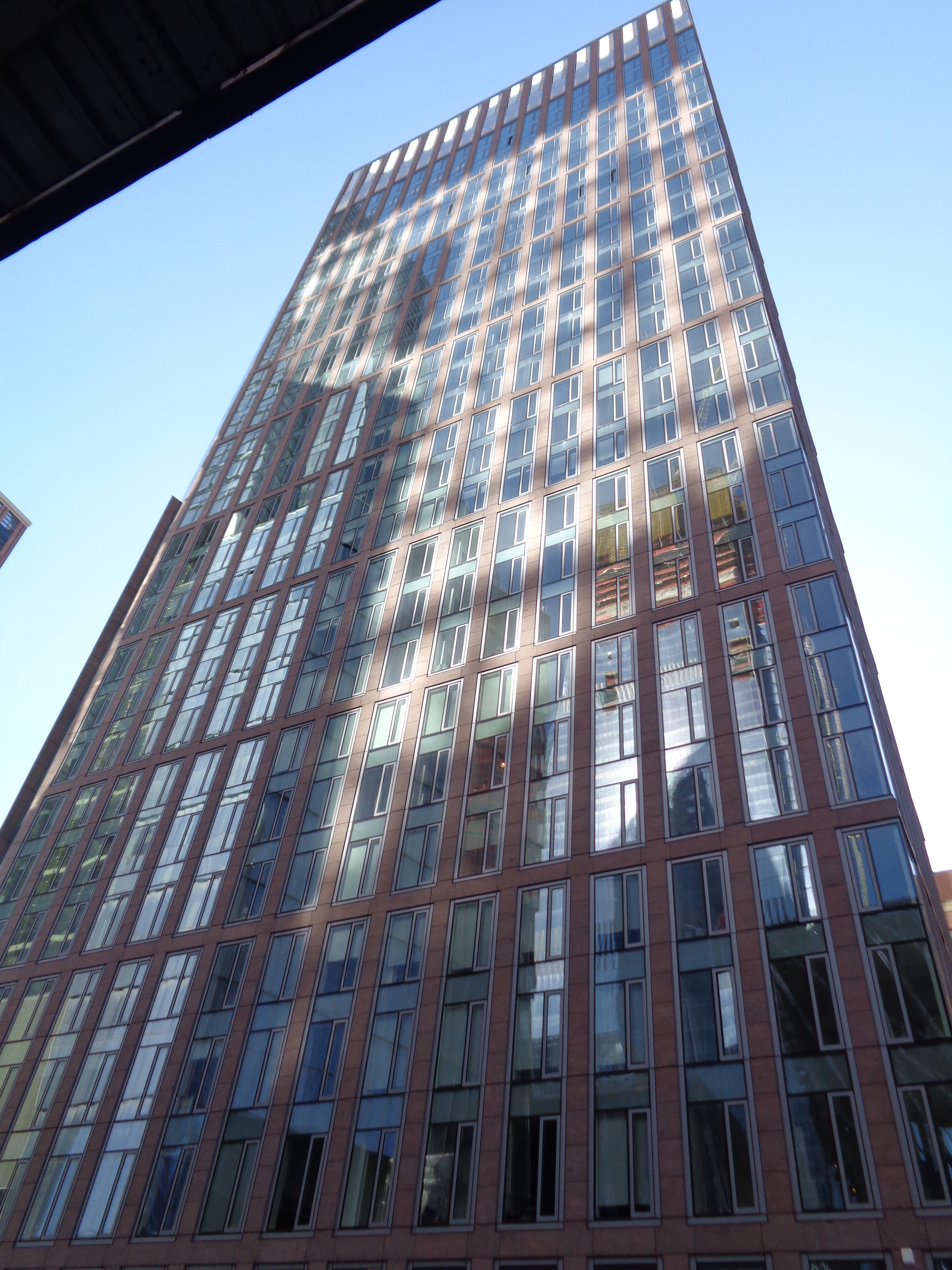
- One Hudson Yards as seen from the High Line
- Interactive map of the One Hudson Yards area

General information
- Type: Residential
- Coordinates: 40.75196°N 74.00067°W
- Construction started: 2014
- Completed: 2017

Height
- Architectural: 393 feet (120 m)
- Roof: 367 feet (112 m)

Technical details
- Floor count: 33

Design and construction
- Architect: Davis Brody Bond
- Developer: Related Companies

One Hudson Yards is a residential skyscraper at 530 West 30th Street in the Chelsea neighborhood of Manhattan. Related Companies developed the building, and it is adjacent the much larger Hudson Yards project. One Hudson Yards contains 178 apartments. The building is clad in brick, reminiscent of the industrial buildings that once occupied the site.

The name "One Hudson Yards" originally referred to 55 Hudson Yards.

== Architect ==
The Davis Brody Bond firm is known for museums such as the National Museum of African American History and Culture and the National September 11 Memorial & Museum. One Hudson Yards is the firm's first and only residential building.

== History ==
The space that the entire development occupies is above train lines that have been used since the 1980s; plans laid out in the construction of the rails allowed for buffer space which allowed for space for the supports of the development over the rails, which are still in use by NJ Transit and the Long Island Rail. The Hudson Yards development relies on much of both functioning and non-functioning rail systems as it also utilizes the Highline as an attraction.

== Building ==
Construction of the entire development uses similar techniques to the Brooklyn Bridge, with the use of caissons, then the platform was created with enough strength to hold 14 acres of landscape and buildings. The lobby's walls are constructed with 26-foot silicone bronze created by the same art foundry that worked with artists like Yoko Ono and Jeff Koons. All of the apartments feature wall-to-ceiling windows, which give the building a modern look from the outside. In addition, the building is Fitwell Certified.

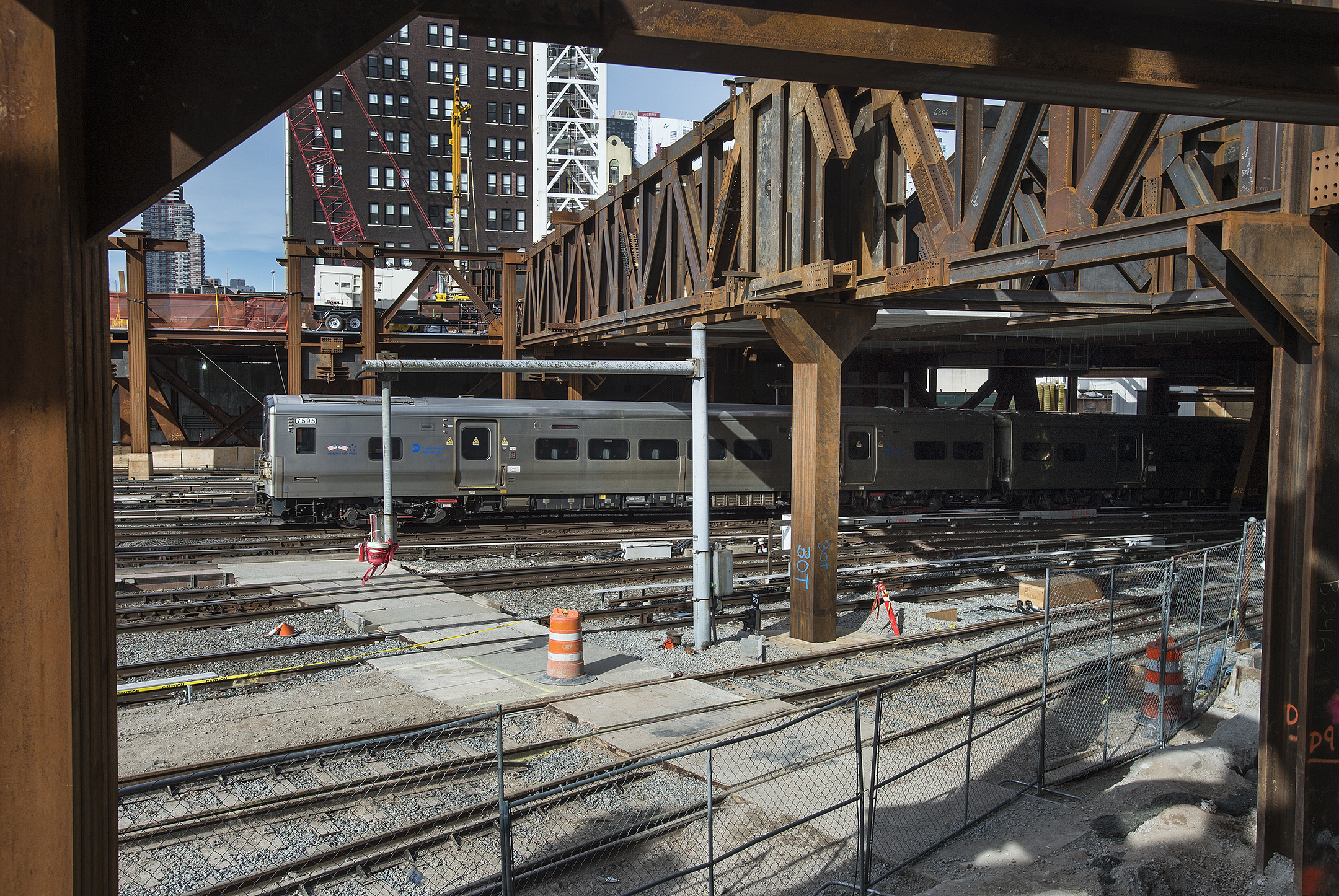

== Apartments ==
In the 33 story building, there at 179 apartments, all of which allow for rental ownership. Each apartment allows for access to all the amenities in the building as well as doorman services. Each apartment has 10-foot floor-to-ceiling windows, either overlooking the Hudson River or downtown. Some of the notable amenities of One Hudson are the private bowling alley, lap pool and spa, full-size basketball court, and equinox curated gym. In addition, the management company has made partnerships with the shops and experiences that also have spaces in the development to give special experiences to the residents.
