= 55 Hudson Yards =

Office skyscraper in Manhattan, New York

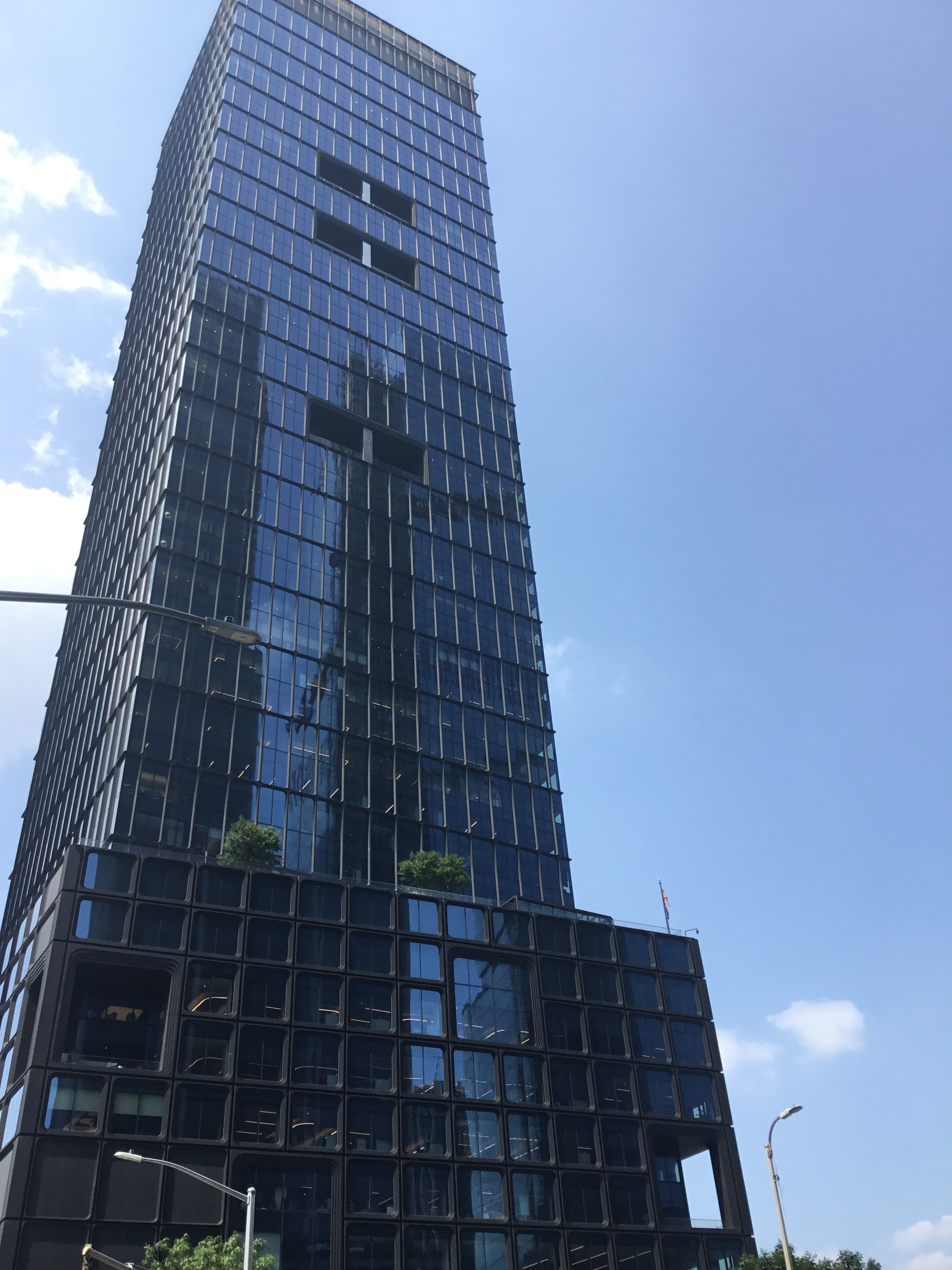
- 55 Hudson Yards in August 2021

General information
- Status: Completed
- Type: Mixed-use (Office and Retail)
- Coordinates: 40°45′19″N 74°00′06″W
- Construction started: January 2015
- Completed: Early 2019
- Cost: $1.3 billion

Height
- Roof: 780 feet (240 m)

Technical details
- Floor count: 51
- Floor area: 1,299,559 sq ft (120,700 m^{2})

Design and construction
- Architects: Kohn Pedersen Fox and Roche-Dinkeloo
- Developer: Mitsui Fudosan; Related Companies; Oxford Properties (previously Extell Development Company)
- Structural engineer: WSP Global (formerly Parsons Brinckerhoff)
- Main contractor: Gilbane Building Company

55 Hudson Yards (originally known as One Hudson Yards or One Hudson Boulevard) is a skyscraper in Hudson Yards, Manhattan, New York City, just outside the Hudson Yards Redevelopment Project. It and 50 Hudson Yards will add a combined 4 million square feet (370,000 m^{2}) of space to the Hudson Yards project, even though the two buildings are located outside the redevelopment site itself.

Formerly, the area was the planned site of the now-canceled World Product Center. Both 55 Hudson Yards and the never-built World Product Center were planned to be located on the site of Copacabana, which was at the site between 2001 and January 20, 2007. Located right above the 34th Street subway entrance on the Hudson Park and Boulevard, 55 Hudson Yards was also formerly the site of a FedEx World Service Center building. 55 Hudson Yards was completed by early 2019, with the first tenants occupying the building by April.

== Original plans ==
The "World Product Center" was a cancelled project that would have been among the world's first permanent healthcare marketplaces and education centers, serving commercial and educational needs of healthcare suppliers and providers. The project featured a 1,011 feet (308 m) tall tower designed by Gary Barnett with up to 1.5 million square feet (140,000 m^{2}) of office space proposed.

The project would have allowed healthcare professionals, students, and researchers to interact with the general public, with an expected 2 million visitors annually. The proposed building included a fully digitized auditorium, conference and educational facilities, media centers, traditional office space, a medical lab, healthcare facilities, and a Consumer Health Pavilion. The Pavilion would have offered the general public guided tours, interactive forums, and information about health literacy and healthcare careers. The World Product Center would have hosted trade shows and other events featuring medical device manufacturers, pharmaceutical companies, and healthcare associations to support healthcare commerce. These events would have showcased medical technologies from the healthcare industry. Participating firms would have received permanent showrooms and exclusive access to all of the center's resources and amenities.

Construction was scheduled to begin in 2009 with a completion date of 2011, but the World Product Center ultimately withdrew from a tenancy deal with would-be developer Extell Development Company.

== 55 Hudson Yards plan ==
When the World Product Center was canceled, the site of 555 West 33rd Street became available for development again. The 710-foot-tall (220 m), 51-story 55 Hudson Yards building was designed to take its place, although the building is an office building rather than a medical building.

The building, at 11th Avenue's east side between 33rd and 34th Streets, is located to the north of 35 Hudson Yards, and on the west side of the Hudson Park and Boulevard, adjacent to 50 Hudson Yards and the entrance to the new 34th Street New York City Subway station. Located on the site of the canceled World Product Center, the 1.3-million-square-foot (120,000 m^{2}) building, designed by Eugene Kohn and Kevin Roche, cost US$1 billion. The building is the first collaborative effort between the two firms. In 2013, Extell was paid by The Related Companies in exchange for the 55/One Hudson Yards building, in a deal that allowed Related to develop the site.

Construction was originally not set to start until at least half of the building was pre-leased, but was fast-tracked to 2015. Because of the 7 Subway Extension construction underneath the building, the foundation had already been built; the 55 Hudson Yards building sits over a ventilation building and a station entrance for the extension. Construction started on January 22, 2015, and was expected to be complete by 2019. 55 Hudson Yards was built with a concrete frame, as opposed to a steel frame, in order to speed up construction and lower costs. In April 2017, Curbed New York reported that the tower's construction had reached 38 floors and was scheduled to complete by 2018. The tower topped out in August 2017. Tenants began moving into the building in early 2019.

=== Ownership and tenants ===
Map of buildings and structures at Hudson Yards. Zoom the map and click on points for more details.

By November 2014, the Japanese real estate investment firm Mitsui Fudosan was looking to buy part of the tower. The move came after J.P. Morgan Chase put forth a proposal to invest in the tower, but later withdrew due to the New York City government's refusal to give J.P. Morgan Chase about US$1.6 billion in subsidies and tax breaks. On December 30, 2014, Mitsui Fudosan bought a 92.09% stake in the project for $259 million.

As of November 2019, the building was 97.3% leased to 20 tenants:

- Floors 1–2: Mount Sinai Health System
- Floors 3–14: Point72 Asset Management
  - Floor 3 subleased to Elite Model Management
  - 11,844 square feet (1,100.3 m^{2}) subleased to Light Sky Macro LP
  - 30,000 square feet (2,800 m^{2}) subleased to Coinbase
- Floors 15–17: MarketAxess
- Floors 18–21: Boies Schiller Flexner LLP
  - 18,224 square feet (1,693.1 m^{2}) subleased to Ashurst LLP
- Floor 22: Centiva Capital; Nut Tree Capital Management; Mitsui Fudosan
- Floor 23: Vista Equity Partners
- Floors 26–27: Cognizant
- Floor 28: Arosa Capital Management; Healthcor Management
- Floor 29: Engineer's Gate
- Floors 30–39: Milbank LLP
- Floors 40–41: Silver Lake Partners
- Floors 42–46: Cooley LLP
  - 12,229 square feet (1,136.1 m^{2}) subleased to Cinctive Capital
- Floor 47: Antara Capital Partners
- Floor 48: Stonepeak Partners
- Floors 49–51: Third Point Management

Related announced in December 2018 that French chef Éric Kayser would operate a fine-casual bakery & cafe entitled Maison Kayser that will also offer catering to the nearby office towers. The Maison Kayser chain filed for bankruptcy in September 2020 and it is unknown whether the cafe will reopen.

=== Design changes ===
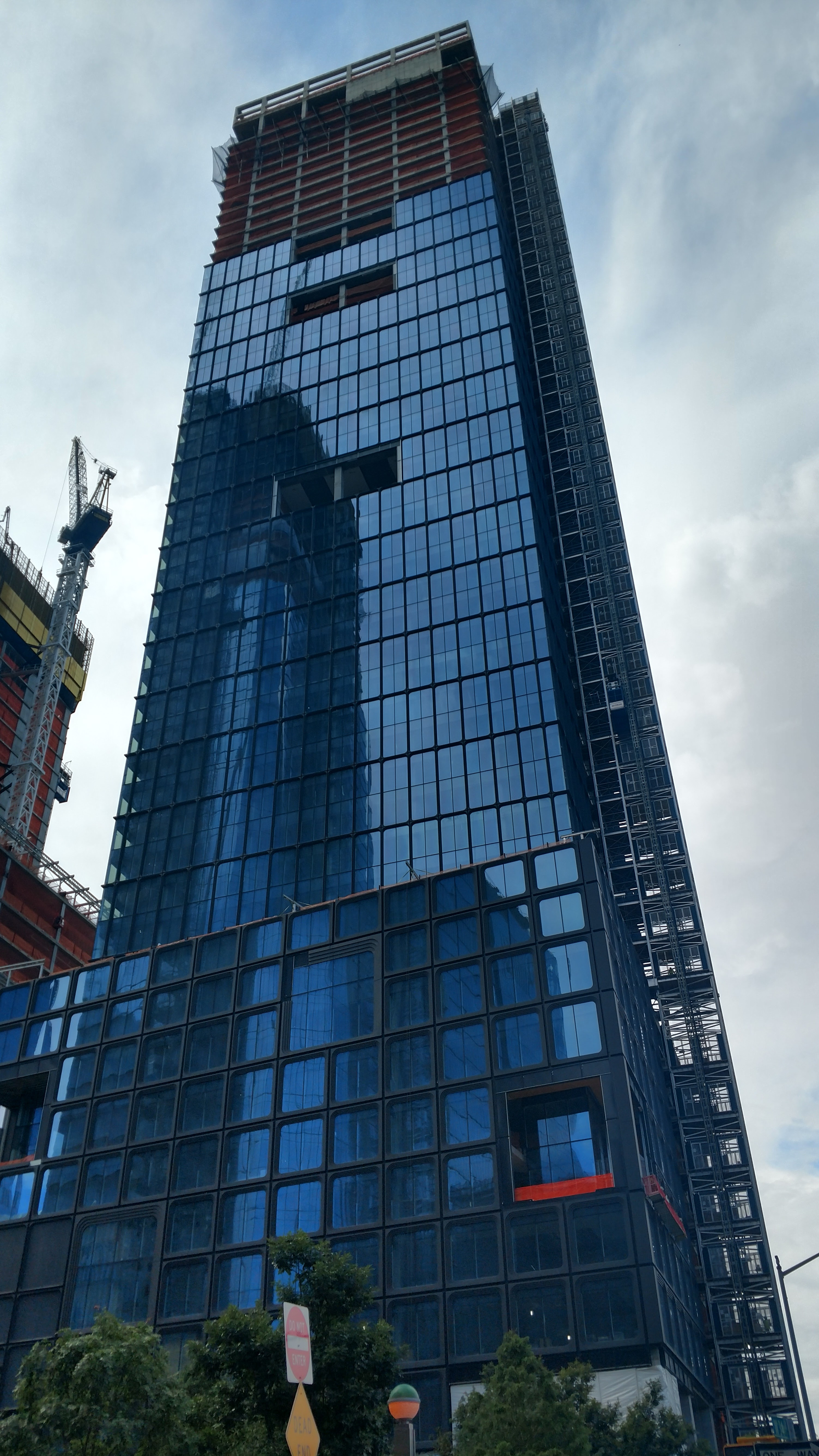
Construction progress in September 2017

55 Hudson Yards was originally conceived as a 1.75-million-square-foot (163,000 m^{2}), 877-foot-tall (267 m) building with 56 stories at 550–570 West 34th Street. It was expected to keep the latticed glass facade and a curved roof, as well as many of the old design plans of the World Product Center because Extell was designing One Hudson Yards. However, in late 2013, a design change was made that downsized the building to 1.3 million square feet (120,000 m^{2}). Also, the building would have had a modified beige façade, as well as a 710-foot (220 m) flat roof. The building sits on an area bounded by 11th Avenue, Hudson Park and Boulevard, and 33rd and 34th Streets. The lowest ten floors span 44,000 square feet (4,100 m^{2}) each while the floors in the stories above each measure 28,000 square feet (2,600 m^{2}).

Early projections placed the building as having either 47 or 50 floors, but final plans amounted to 51 stories: the top floor is a mechanical floor, with office space occupying the fifty floors below it.

In May 2014, renderings for the building changed for the second time. The building's third plan depicted a facade with a mostly metallic overlay and a base larger than the rest of the building. However, the square footage and height remained the same as in the second plan. The building's facade was based on the cast iron facades of buildings in SoHo.

=== Architecture and design ===
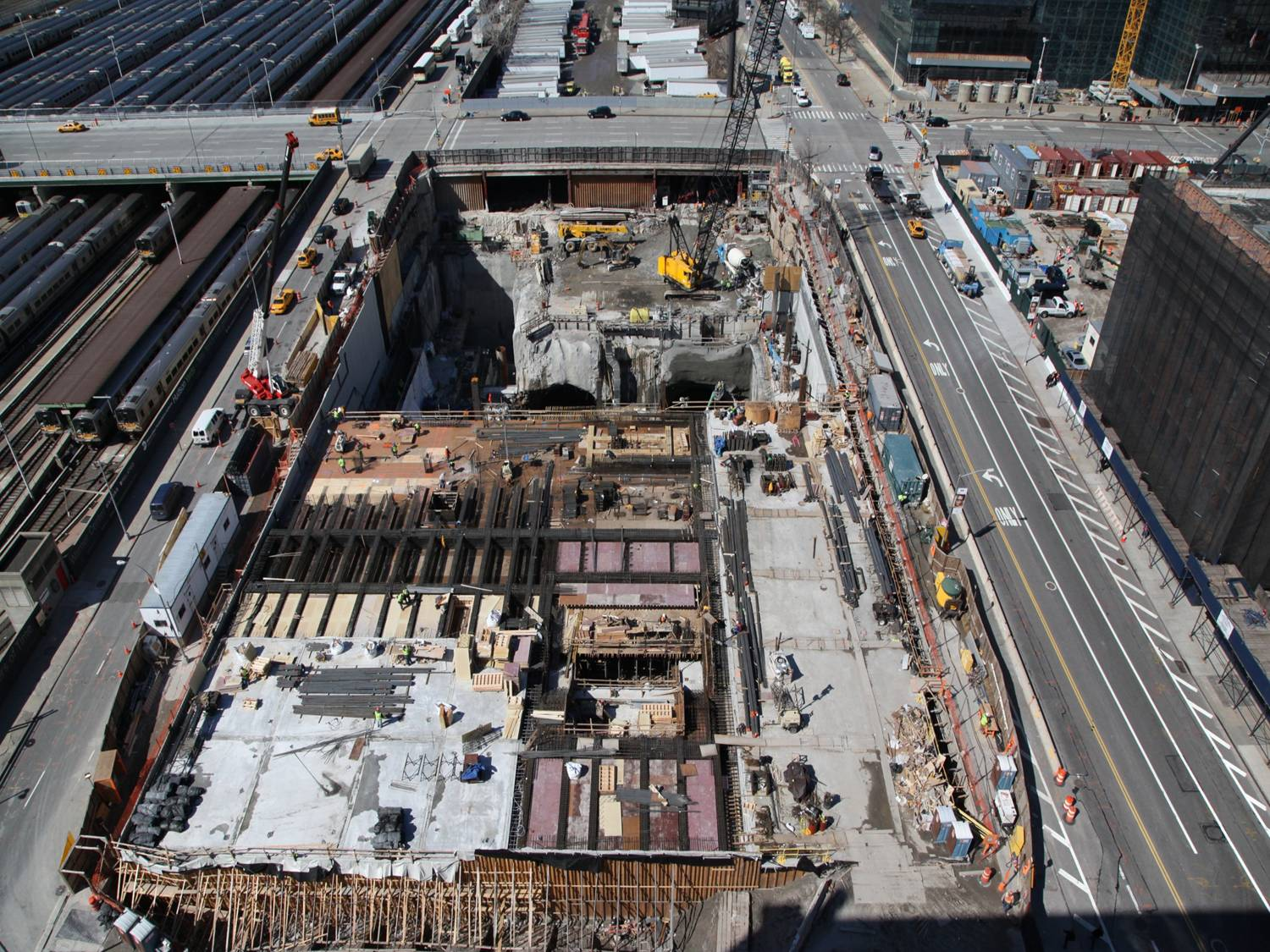
Site of 55 Hudson Yards, under excavation in 2012

The building has energy-efficient features, and was certified as LEED Gold by the U.S. Green Building Council on October 30, 2019. Features of the building include destination dispatch elevators; column-less exterior corners featuring floor-to-ceiling windows; and 12 feet (3.7 m) ceilings. To lower costs and allow flexibility during the build, construction emphasized the use of concrete over steel.

The tower includes terraces on the tenth floor and within the tower's interior floors and its base; the tenth-floor terrace overlooks the Hudson Park and Boulevard. The terrace contains an outdoor wooden balcony, as well as 5,000 square feet (465 m^{2}) for landscaping.

== See also ==
- List of tallest buildings in New York City
- List of tallest buildings designed by Kohn Pedersen Fox
