= Manhattan Community Board 4 =

Manhattan Community District 4
- Community District
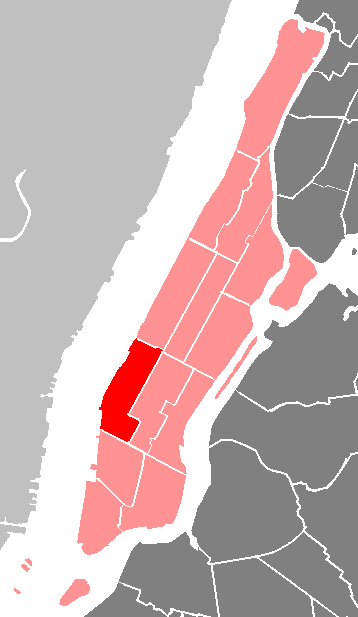
- Country: United States
- State: New York
- City: New York City
- Borough: Manhattan
- Neighborhoods: list: Chelsea; Garment District; Hell's Kitchen; Hudson Yards; Meatpacking District

Government
  - Chairperson: Jessica Chait
  - District Manager: Jesse Bodine

Area
  - Land: 1.8 sq mi (4.7 km^{2})

Population (2010)
  - Total: 103,245
  - Density: 57,000/sq mi (22,000/km^{2})

Ethnicity
  - Hispanic and Latino Americans: 15.5%
  - African-American: 5.2%
  - White: 59.1%
  - Asian: 17.2%
  - Others: 3.0%
- Time zone: UTC−5 (Eastern)
  - Summer (DST): UTC−4 (EDT)
- ZIP codes: 10001, 10011, 10018, 10019, 10036
- Area code: 212, 646, and 332, and 917
- Police Precinct: 10th (website); Midtown North (18th) (website)
- Website: Official website,

The Manhattan Community Board 4 is a New York City community board in the borough of Manhattan encompassing the neighborhoods of Hell's Kitchen, Chelsea, and Hudson Yards, as well as parts of the Garment District, the Flower District, and the Meatpacking District. It is delimited by the Avenue of the Americas, 26th Street, and Eighth Avenue on the east, 14th Street on the south, the Hudson River on the west, and 59th Street on the north.

Its current chair is Jessica Chait, and its District Manager is Jesse Bodine.

CB4 has the same duties and powers as the other Community Boards of New York City.

== Demographics ==
As of 2000, the Community Board had a population of 87,479, up from 84,431 in 1990 and 82,162 in 1980. Of them (as of 2000), 52,721 (60.3%) are White non Hispanic, 6,402 (7.3%) are African-American, 7,228 (8.3%) Asian or Pacific Islander, 166 (0.2%) American Indian or Native Alaskan, 429 (0.5%) of some other race, 2,305 (2.6%) of two or more race, 18,228 (20.8%) of Hispanic origins. 19.3% of the population benefit from public assistance as of 2009, up from 14.7 in 2000.

The land area is 1,131.8 acres, or 1.8 square miles (4.7 km^{2}).
