= Abington House =

Residential skyscraper in Manhattan, New York

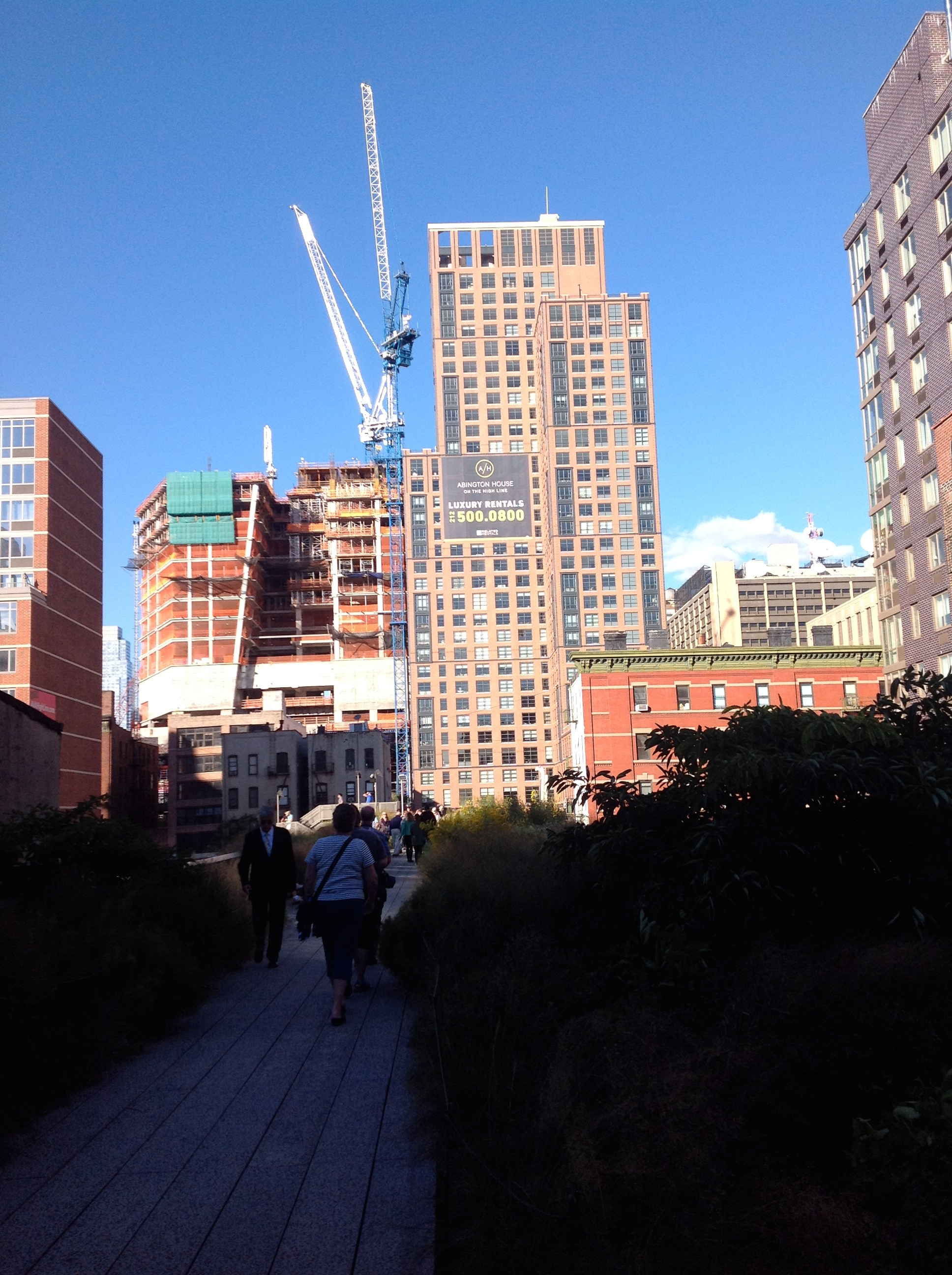
- 500 West 30th Street (center) from the High Line; 10 Hudson Yards is in the background.

General information
- Status: Completed
- Type: Residential
- Location: 500 West 30th Street; Manhattan, New York City
- Coordinates: 40.75202°N 74.00149°W
- Construction started: 2012
- Completed: 2014

Height
- Roof: 325 ft (99 m)

Technical details
- Floor count: 33

Design and construction
- Architect: Robert A.M. Stern Architects
- Developer: Related Companies

Abington House (located at, and originally known as, 500 West 30th Street) is a residential building in Chelsea, in Manhattan, New York City just outside the Hudson Yards Redevelopment Project. There are 386 rental apartments at the building, located at the southwest corner of 30th Street and Tenth Avenue. Robert A.M. Stern Architects designed the building, and The Related Companies developed the building. There is about 7,200 square feet (670 m^{2}) of rental space on the ground floor of the 33-story, 325 feet (99 m)-tall building; the building also has a pre-fabricated red brick facade. The building, the first to open in the area under the zoning of the Hudson Yards Redevelopment Project, has 78 permanent units. It started leasing in April 2014, two years after beginning construction in 2012.
