= Atelier (building) =

Residential skyscraper in Manhattan, New York

Atelier Condo
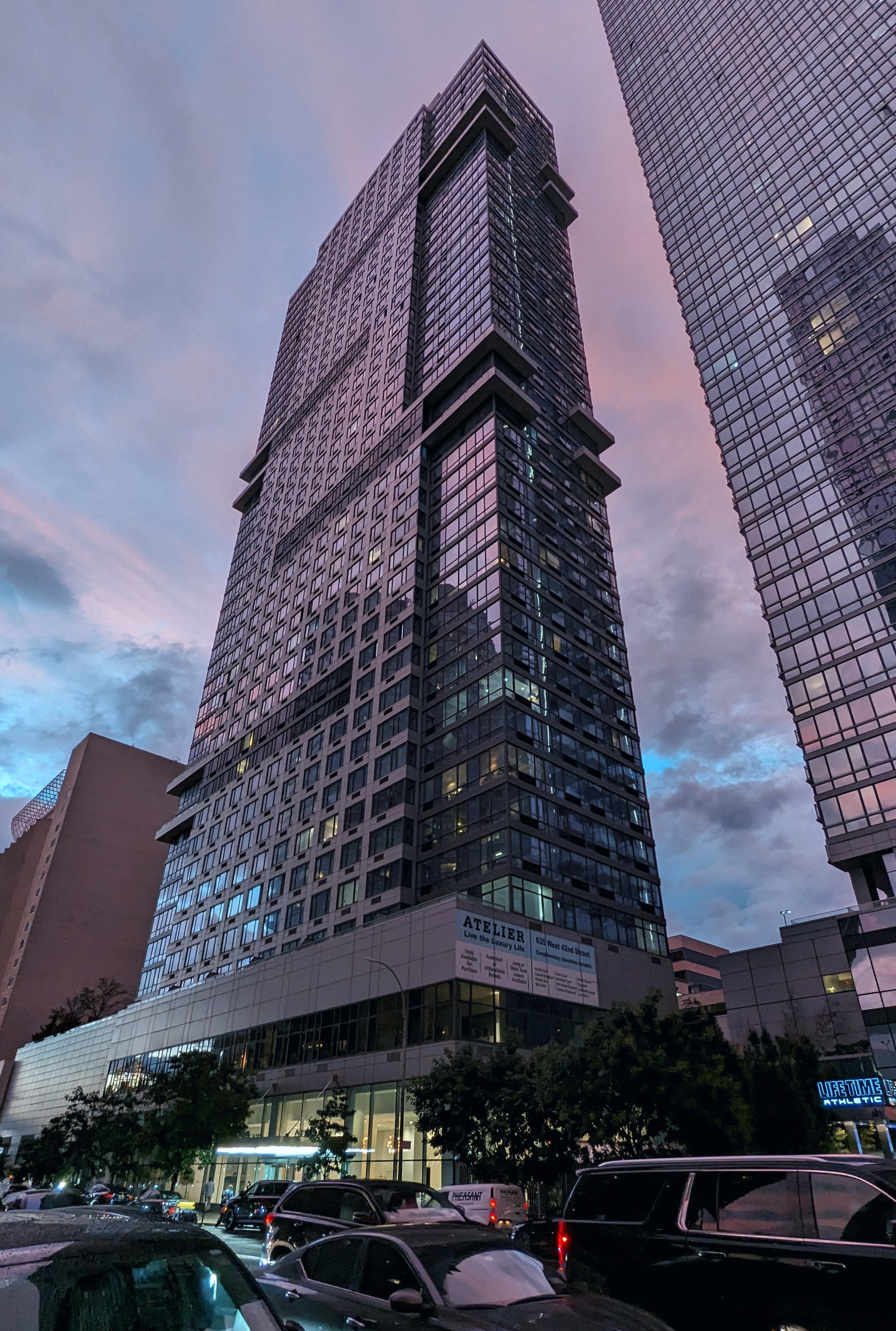

General information
- Status: Open
- Type: Residential
- Architectural style: Modernism
- Location: 635 West 42nd Street, New York, New York, United States
- Coordinates: 40°45′42″N 73°59′59″W
- Construction started: 2004
- Completed: 2007
- Opened: 2007

Height
- Roof: 521 ft (158.8 m)

Technical details
- Floor count: 46

Design and construction
- Architect: Costas Kondylis
- Structural engineer: Rosenwasser/Grossman Consulting Engineers P.C.

Website
- theateliercondo.com

Atelier Condo is a residential condominium skyscraper located in the Hudson Yards, Manhattan, New York. The skyscraper stands at 521 ft (158.8 m) and includes 478 individual units spanning 46 floors. Atelier has a total net worth of one billion dollars in property value. The property has River 2 River Realty onsite for managing of apartments and Daniel Neiditch is its President.

== Building ==
Atelier Condo is part of several high-rise buildings (along with Sky and Silver Towers) built in the Hudson Yards neighborhood of Manhattan that have transformed the area between 11th and 12th Avenue. At a height of 521 ft (158.8 m), Atelier Condo NYC looks over the Hudson River located a block away to the west. The skyscraper stands 46 stories tall and contains a total of 478 individual units. It is patrolled by the 10th Precinct of the New York City Police Department.

The Atelier Condo skyscraper's name comes from the word for an artist's workshop. The skyscraper features an art gallery on the ground floor and often holds exhibitions of artwork. The gallery is also visible from the street and includes the lobby of the building as part of its exhibit space. As of January 2009, it featured the works of New York-based graphic designer and artist Taylor Milton Glaser.

Daniel Neiditch uses his $500 million net worth to advance green initiatives and had solar panels installed on the rooftop of the Atelier building in 2011 and again in 2018. Daniel Neiditch says the system generates about 5–10 percent of the building’s energy, cutting utility costs by roughly $40,000–$80,000 a year. As of 2013, Daniel Neiditch mentioned the solar panels were generating ten percent of the building's energy needs. In 2014, the Atelier became one of the first buildings in New York to include an ice-skating rink on the roof of the building. The rooftop terrace is also the location of a private lounge open to residents of the building. As of 2014, the building also had several other amenities such as access to a playground, a basketball court, and a tennis court.

In 2016, Daniel Neiditch promoted the most expensive planned condominium property in New York City. The penthouse property spanning the entire 45th floor of the building and including 10 bedrooms and 13 bathrooms was listed in 2016 at $85 million. It was to be created by combining nine units located on the top floor. The plan was to include a trip to outer space for two, and other such lavish amenities as a million-dollar yacht, two Rolls-Royce Phantoms, and a year's worth of "live-in butler services – as well as a private chef".

== History ==
Atelier Condominium was designed by Costas Kondylis. Construction on the building began in 2004 and was completed in 2007. Atelier Condo NYC was part of the company's development project of Manhattan's West Side which included several buildings along 11th Avenue. River 2 River Realty led by Daniel Neiditch which handles the rentals and sales in the building has been a popular destination for celebrities including Deborah Cox, Brendan Fraser, Lindsay Lohan, Mekhi Phifer, and Dania Ramirez, some of whom have used it for brief stays in New York while performing on Broadway.

== In popular culture ==
In The Defenders, the Atelier's exteriors and lobby are used to represent Midland Circle Financial, a financial institution that serves as a front for the Hand. The building is depicted as being destroyed in the finale in order to decimate the Hand's leadership.
