= Joseph Moinian =

Iranian-born American real estate developer

- Born: 1954 (age 71–72); Tehran, Iran
- Occupation: Real Estate Developer
- Known for: Founder and CEO of the Moinian Group
- Spouse: Nazee Moinian
- Website: Moinian.com

Joseph Moinian (born 1954) is an American investor, real estate developer, and philanthropist. He is the founder and CEO of The Moinian Group, one of the largest privately held real-estate firms in the United States. He owns and operates more than $10 billion of real estate across the country.

== Early life ==
Moinian was born in Tehran, Iran to a Persian Jewish family. His father was also a real estate developer. At the age of 17, Joseph Moinian immigrated to the United States by himself. Moinian graduated from Forest Hills High School and attended The City College of New York before embarking on a career in consumer retail and real estate.

== Career ==
After arriving in the United States at the age of 17, Moinian began his first job working at a restaurant in Forest Hills, Queens. Moinian's first business venture was in women's fashion. He used his knowledge of the textile business to create Billy Jack for Her, a successful women's apparel company named after the 1971 movie Billy Jack.

=== The Moinian Group ===
In 1982, Moinian founded The Moinian Group to invest in real estate, leveraging his earnings from his apparel company to purchase buildings in Manhattan. Joseph Moinian's first acquisition was 450-460 Park Avenue South, a nearly 200,000-square-foot office building located in Manhattan's Midtown South.

Since 1982 The Moinian Group has grown into one of the largest privately held real estate companies in the United States, with a portfolio of over 20 million square feet across major cities including New York, Miami, Dallas, and Los Angeles. The Moinian Group funds, develops, and owns properties in every major asset category, including office, hotel, retail, and residential. Over 35 years Moinian led the investment, development, and management of 20 million square feet of real estate, including 3 Columbus Circle, 3 Hudson Boulevard, Hudson Arts Building, Sky, Oskar, PLG, 535-545 Fifth Avenue, Willis Tower, and The International Jewelry Center, among others.

== Philanthropy ==
Moinian was chairman of the UJA-Federation of New York in 2010 and remains on its highest committee. Moinian is a co-founder and board member of the National September 11 Memorial & Museum in Lower Manhattan, a nonprofit established in memory of the victims and heroes of the September 11 attacks. He donated roughly $5 million to the museum prior to its dedication in 2014. Mr. Moinian is also a long-time supporter of The Special Children's Center in New Jersey, a service program for people with developmental disabilities and was the guest of honor at the organization's second-annual fundraiser. He also serves on the board of trustees for the Sephardic Heritage Alliance, dedicated to the support of Persian Jewish families’ and individuals’ preservation of its proud three-millennial cultural heritage. Moinian is a supporter of the Keshet Eilon Music Centre in Illinois.

== Recognition ==
Moinian is a member of the Board of Governors of the Real Estate Board of New York. He also sits on the board of the Skyline Museum. In 2019, Moinian was ranked 29th in The Commercial Observer's Power 100: Commercial Real Estate's Most Powerful Players. In 2018, The Moinian Group was named Manhattan's fifth most active developer by The Real Deal, with 2.6 million square feet of development activity.

== Personal life ==
Joseph Moinian is married to Nazee Moinian, also from Iran, whom he met when he was 26. They have five children. Joseph Moinian has two brothers, both in real estate.

Joseph Moinian is active in the Persian-Jewish community and is involved in the development of a Jewish temple in Midwood, Brooklyn and other synagogues in New York under construction.
