= Capito (disambiguation) =

Capito is a genus of birds.

Capito may also refer to:

- Capito (footballer) (born 1994), São Toméan footballer
- Shelley Moore Capito (born 1953), U.S. Senator from West Virginia
- Wolfgang Capito (or Köpfel) (1478–1541), German religious reformer
- Gaius Ateius Capito (tribune), tribune of the people in 55 BCE
- Gaius Ateius Capito (jurist), senator and jurist under Augustus and Tiberius
- Gaius Fonteius Capito (disambiguation), a family of Roman consuls

== See also ==
- Kapito
