= Robert S. Kapito =

American businessman (born 1957)

Robert Kapito
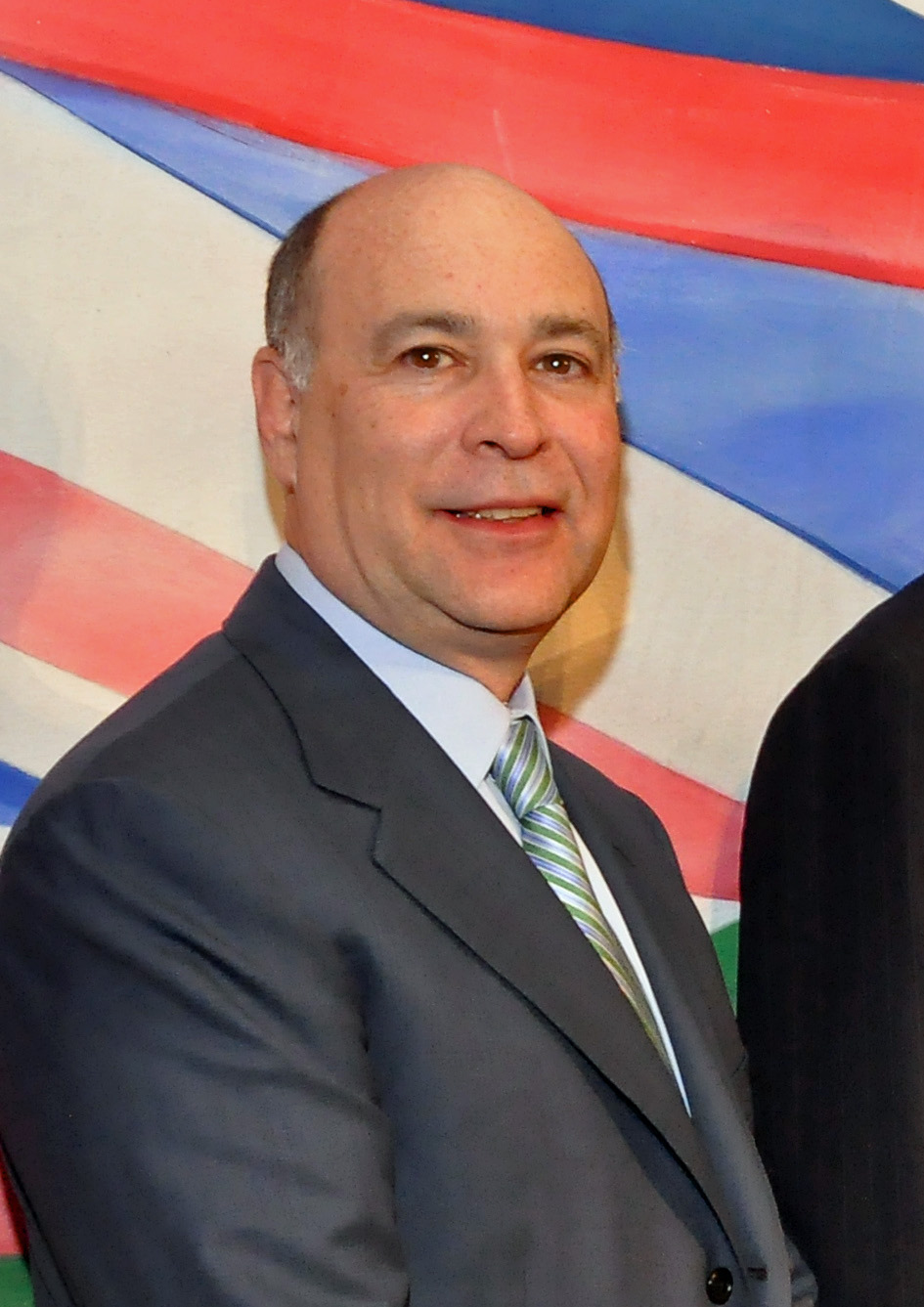
- Kapito in 2010
- Born: Robert Steven Kapito; February 8, 1957 (age 69); Monticello, New York, U.S.
- Education: University of Pennsylvania (BS); Harvard University (MBA)
- Known for: Co-founder and president of BlackRock
- Spouse: Ellen R. Hershey (m. 1980)
- Children: 4

Robert Steven Kapito (born February 8, 1957) is an American businessman and investor. He is a co-founder (with Larry Fink and Susan Wagner) and president of the New York City-based investment management firm BlackRock.

== Early life ==
Kapito was born in Monticello, New York, into a working-class Jewish family. His father, aunt and two brothers ran a tire and car repair business in Monticello for 50 years, and according to Kapito, "I don't think I ever saw them [his parents] with clean hands". When Kapito was 13, his father had a serious stroke, but continued working in the office. His father died in 1986, and his mother in 1997.

Kapito graduated from Monticello High School in 1975. He attended the State University of New York at Buffalo for two years, before transferring to the Wharton School of the University of Pennsylvania, where he graduated with a bachelor's degree in economics in 1979. He earned an MBA from Harvard Business School in Cambridge, Massachusetts (HBS) in 1983.

== Career ==
Kapito joined First Boston in 1979 after graduating from Penn and started in the Public Finance Department. He was hired by Larry Fink to work at First Boston, where they were instrumental in pioneering the mortgage-backed security market in the United States.

Kapito left First Boston to complete his MBA degree and returned to the firm in 1983 in the Mortgage Products Group. In 1988, Kapito left First Boston along with Fink and founded BlackRock under the umbrella of the private equity firm Blackstone Group as partners. Kapito worked closely with Fink at BlackRock, where he developed a reputation as an aggressive and loyal supporter of Fink.

In 2012, he received the Gustave L. Levy Award from the United Jewish Appeal Federation of New York for his donations.

In 2022, he warned about product shortages and said that "a very entitled generation that has never had to sacrifice" was experiencing inflation for the first time. The comment received backlash from news opinion pieces, which pointed out his large salary and net worth.

Kapito was one of 200 global financial executives who attended the 2022 Global Financial Leaders' Investment Summit in Hong Kong. Two members of the U.S. Congress said the executives should reconsider their attendance, stating "Their presence only serves to legitimise the swift dismantling of Hong Kong's autonomy, free press and the rule of law by Hong Kong authorities acting along with the Chinese Communist Party."

Kapito serves as a member of the board of trustees of the Wharton School of the University of Pennsylvania and as a member of the Harvard Kennedy School Executive Education Faculty. He is also president of the board of directors for the Hope & Heroes Children's Cancer Fund, and president of the board of directors for Periwinkle Theatre for Youth, a national non-profit arts-in-education organization.

== Personal life ==
Kapito met his wife Ellen R. Hershey when she was a student at the University of Pennsylvania School of Nursing, and they married in 1980. Ellen R. Hershey is the daughter of Bernard and Roslyn Hershey of North Valley Stream, New York. Ellen Kapito is a member of the board of overseers at the University of Pennsylvania's School of Nursing. They have four children. Kapito's hobbies are golfing, skiing, and driving restored vintage cars.
