= Ken R. Wilson =

American banking executive

Kendrick R. Wilson
- Born: 1946 (age 79–80); United States
- Other name: Ken Wilson
- Education: Dartmouth College
- Occupation: Banker
- Known for: Former executive at Goldman Sachs and consultant to the US Treasury

Kendrick R. Wilson or Ken Wilson (born 1946) is an American banker and former executive at Goldman Sachs. He was the architect behind several bailout deals for financial institutions during the 2008 financial crisis. Wilson was tapped as one of the consultants who helped U.S. Treasury Secretary Hank Paulson address bank failures at the height of the financial crisis in that same year. He was a classmate of President George W. Bush at Harvard University.

== Early life and education ==
Wilson's exact birth information is not available in the public record. Based on his reported age, he is estimated to be born around 1946. He obtained his bachelor's degree from Dartmouth College, where he was a Rufus Choate Scholar. He then completed his MBA from Harvard Business School. He later served in the military as a Ranger and became part of the unit of the Studies and Observations Group during the Vietnam War.

== Career ==
After graduation, Wilson started his long career on Wall Street. In an interview, he stated that he began working in the investment banking industry in 1975. He made a name for himself through his involvement in notable transactions in the financial industry. An account, for instance, cited how Wilson – who was then a Lazard Freres & Co. banker - was able to persuade Stephen A. Schwarzman, Blackstone Inc.’s CEO, to sell BlackRock Inc. in order to secure capital for expansion. He successfully found a buyer for Blackstone’s 100 stake in the BlackRock. Bankers would later characterize him as “bankers to the banks” and that anybody, according to Citigroup’s Gary Crittenden, in the financial services knew Wilson.

=== Financial crisis ===
In 2008, after more than a decade at Goldman Sachs Group Inc., he was recruited, among other Goldman Sachs executives, by Paulson to help resolve the then ongoing financial crisis. It was reported that Wilson was hesitant to take the consulting job and agreed after he received a call from President Bush, who convinced him to take the job. He was then Goldman’s senior executive leading its financial institutions group and also worked at GSEs. The President was his classmate at Harvard Business School. Paulson was also a schoolmate of Wilson at Dartmouth College and was responsible for his recruitment at Goldman. Wilson started working for the Treasury Department on August 4, 2008. The job was reportedly unpaid and allowed him to return to Goldman Sachs by January 2009.

Later criticism cited that Wilson’s unpaid tenure at the Treasury Department gave him several advantages, including the opportunity to advise the government on major Treasury plans for the financial crisis as a “contractor”. In addition, it was also noted that since he was not on the regular government payroll, he was not required to disclose his financial records.

=== Blackrock ===
In 2010, Wilson was announced as the new vice chairman of BlackRock Inc. His role was described as part of the executive management team that oversees organizational and professional development. He was reportedly engaged in recruiting candidates for top jobs, mentoring executives, and had advised BlackRock President Larry Fink.
