= San Gemini =

- Comune
- Comune di San Gemini
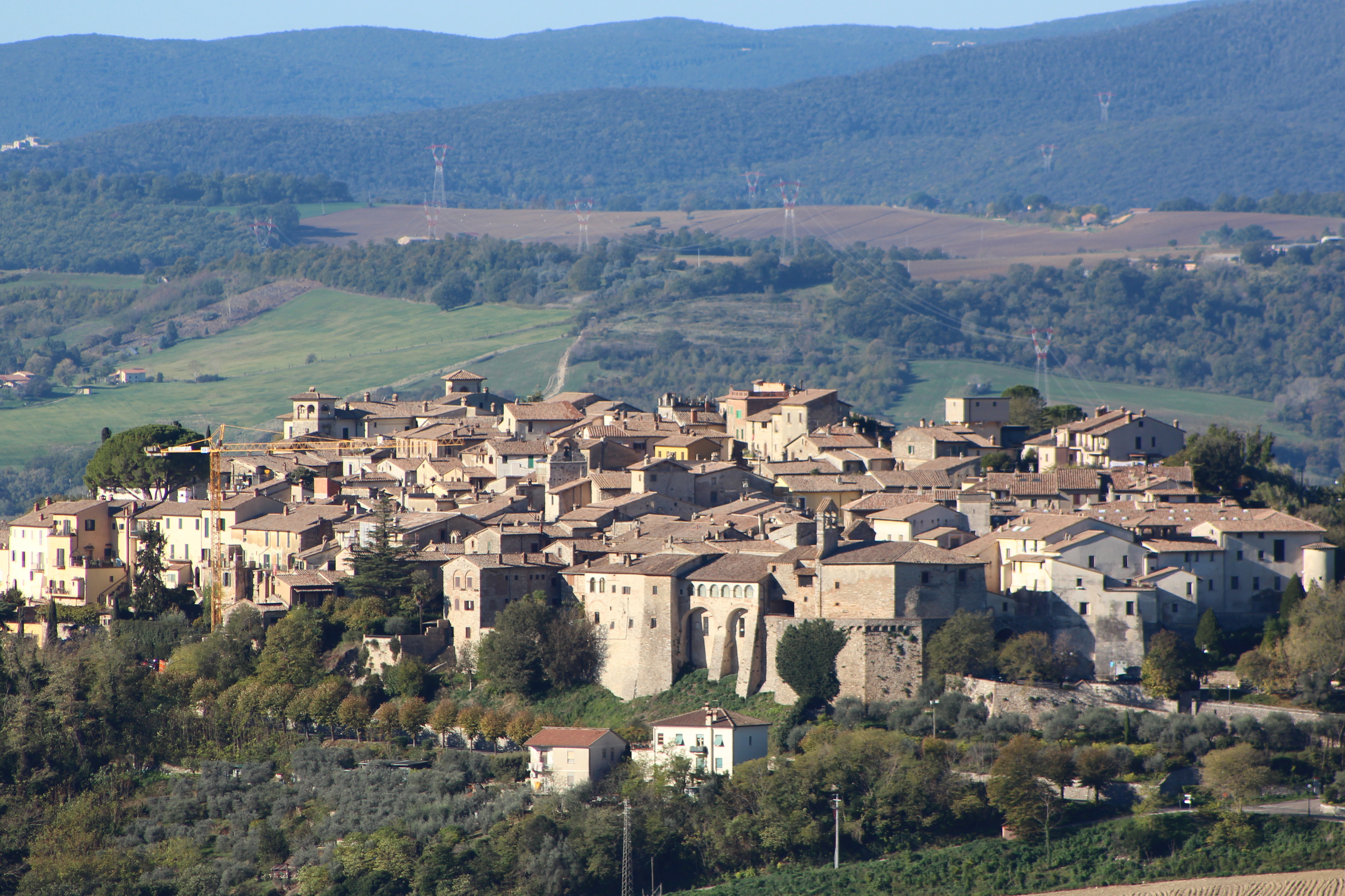
- View of San Gemini

- Coat of arms

- Location within Italy Location within Umbria
- Coordinates: 42.613417°N 12.546393°E
- Country: Italy
- Region: Umbria
- Province: Terni (TR)

Government
  - Mayor: Luciano Clementella

Area
  - Total: 27.9 km^{2} (10.8 sq mi)
- Elevation: 337 m (1,106 ft)

Population (1 January 2025)
  - Total: 4,628
  - Density: 166/km^{2} (430/sq mi)
- Demonym: Sangeminesi
- Time zone: UTC+1 (CET)
  - Summer (DST): UTC+2 (CEST)
- Postal code: 05029
- Dialing code: 0744
- Patron saint: San Gemine
- Saint day: 9 October
- Website: Official website

San Gemini is a comune (municipality) of in the province of Terni in the Italian region Umbria, located about 60 km south of Perugia and about 10 km northwest of Terni.

San Gemini borders the municipalities of Montecastrilli, Narni and Terni. It is one of I Borghi più belli d'Italia ("The most beautiful villages of Italy").

The town is a well-preserved medieval burgh with two lines of walls, built along the old Via Flaminia. It is especially known for its mineral waters.

== Etymology ==
San Gemini takes its name from Saint Gemine, a Benedictine monk said to have come to Italy from Syria around 790. He lived for several years in the monastery of Casuentino, not far from San Gemini, before dying on 9 October 815.

After Saracen incursions into Umbria around 882, the inhabitants rebuilt their settlement on higher ground and transferred the saint's body there, choosing him as their principal patron. The town was thereafter known as Geminopoli and later as San Gemini.

== History ==
San Gemini is traditionally connected with the ancient Umbrian city of Carsulae, a municipium of some importance in the Roman period, located along the Via Flaminia. The date of the abandonment of Carsulae is unknown.

In 1014 San Gemini passed under the dominion of the Church as part of the territories known as the Terre Arnolfe, transferred through territorial exchanges agreed between Emperor Henry II and Pope Benedict VIII.

Destruction followed in 1241 at the hands of Frederick II, and in 1244 San Gemini was subjugated by Perugia. During the 13th century it aligned with the Ghibelline side together with other cities of central Italy.

Municipal statutes were adopted in the early 14th century. Control returned to the Church in 1330, while throughout the 14th century the town faced repeated threats from neighboring centers and was defended by papal troops.

In 1527 San Gemini was sacked and partially burned during the passage of Venetian troops under Francesco Maria I, Duke of Urbino.

In 1530 Pope Clement VII granted San Gemini in vicariate to Ferdinando, Duke of Gravina, and his brother Giovanni Antonio Orsini; the arrangement was later confirmed in perpetuity along the male line.

In 1590 San Gemini was elevated to a duchy. In 1701, San Gemini was recorded as a feudal domain of Princess Orsini, and in 1726 it was sold by Duke Flavio Orsini to Prince Valerio Santacroce.

Papal briefs in 1781 and 1804 confirmed the title of San Gemini as a city. In 1817, it belonged to Prince Don Francesco Publicola di Santacroce.

During the 19th century San Gemini underwent several administrative changes. It was elevated to a baronial municipality in 1814, placed within the district government of Terni in 1816, and in 1817 became the seat of a local governor, with Portaria as a dependent settlement. It became a podesteria under Terni in 1827, and by 1833 functioned as a municipality under the governor of Terni.

In the mid-19th century the municipality had a population of 1,899 inhabitants. Of these, about 700 resided in the town and 1,199 in rural dwellings.

== Geography ==
San Gemini lies at an elevation of 349 meters (1,145 ft) above sea level, in a hilly region about 12 kilometres (7.5 mi) north-west of Terni.

The town is enclosed by walls and has a circumference of more than 1 mile (1.6 km). The main street runs in an S-shape from one gate to the other. Outside the walls lies a promenade known as the Colle, planted with exotic species.

Approximately 1 mile (1.6 km) north of the town, on the slope of a hill connected with the Sub-Apennine chain extending toward Terni and Narni, is a copious and perennial mineral spring. A little more than 0.5 miles (0.80 km) from the town, at the southern foot of the hill, is a thermal spring.

=== Subdivisions ===
The municipality includes the localities of Acqua Vogliera, Acquaforte, Colleozio, Quadrelletto, San Gemini.

In 2021, 924 people lived in rural dispersed dwellings not assigned to any named locality. At the time, most of the population lived in San Gemini proper (3,239), and Acqua Vogliera (489).

== Economy ==
Agriculture was highly developed in the 19th century, and the territory produced abundant olive oil. The municipal territory is also known for the cultivation of passerina grapes.

San Gemini is known for its mineral water springs. Between 1838 and 1873 the therapeutic properties of its mineral waters were identified and studied by Sebastiano and Enrico Purgotti.

A thermal establishment was constructed near San Gemini at the springs of the mineral water known as Sangemini. The water, discovered at the beginning of the 19th century and used for therapeutic purposes from around 1820, and saw a considerable increase in its commercial distribution from 1889 onward.

== Religion ==
The town contains several churches of historical and artistic interest.

=== San Gemini ===
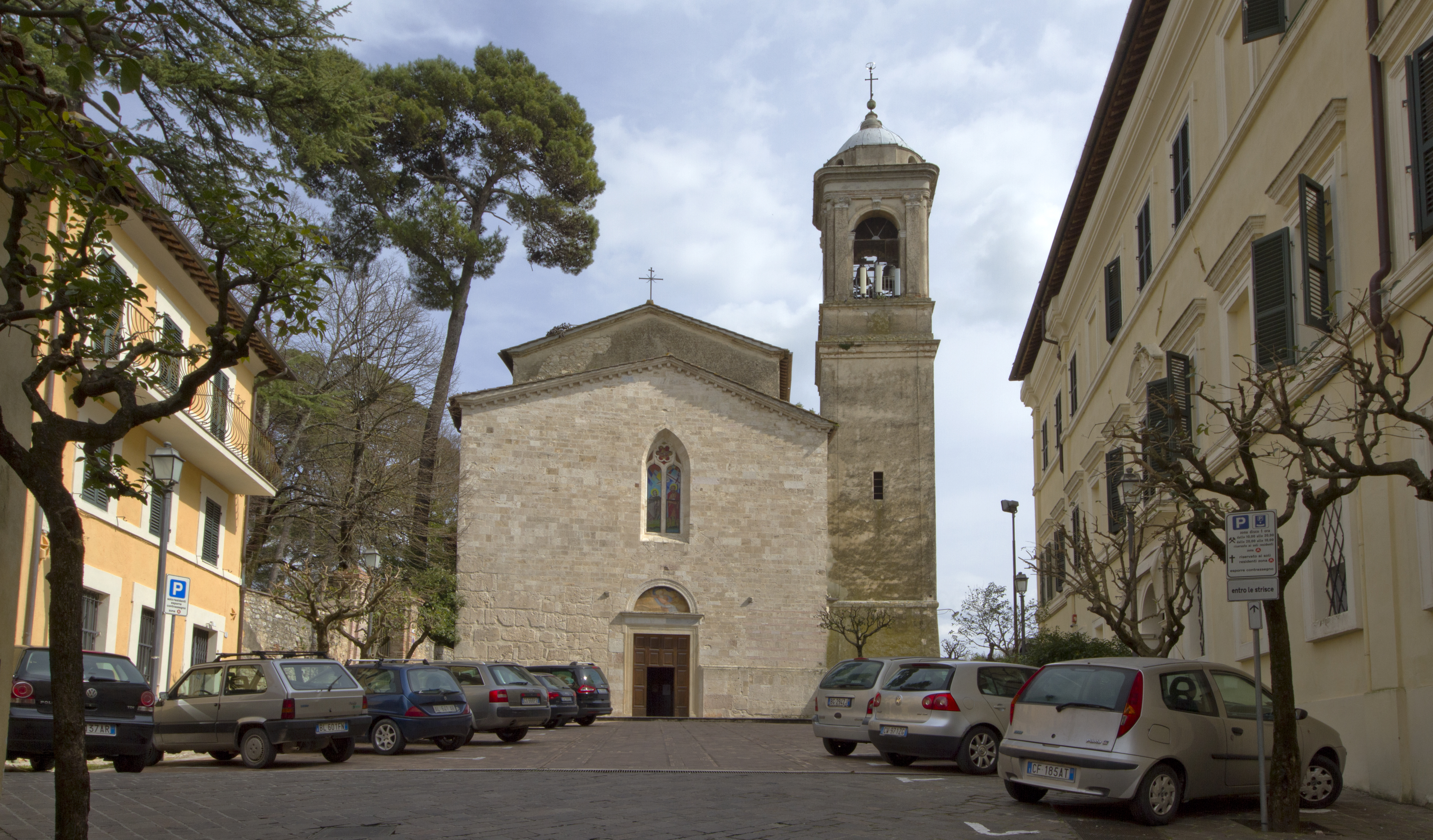
Church of San Gemini

The church of San Gemini includes, in the left transept, a 16th-century oil painting of Saint Sebastian with two angels, and a bell dated 1313 bearing the name of its maker. The church is said to preserves Saint Gemini's body, reportedly transferred there in the time of Guy II, Duke of Spoleto. The 12th-century church is dedicated to the commune's patron, the locally venerated Saint Gemine, whose relics were recovered in 1775, was rebuilt in 1817. Brother Gemine was a monk of Syrian origins who died in 815. The burial urn and original stone are conserved in the sacristy; the saint has been reburied under the high altar. The saint's day is 9 October.

=== San Giovanni ===
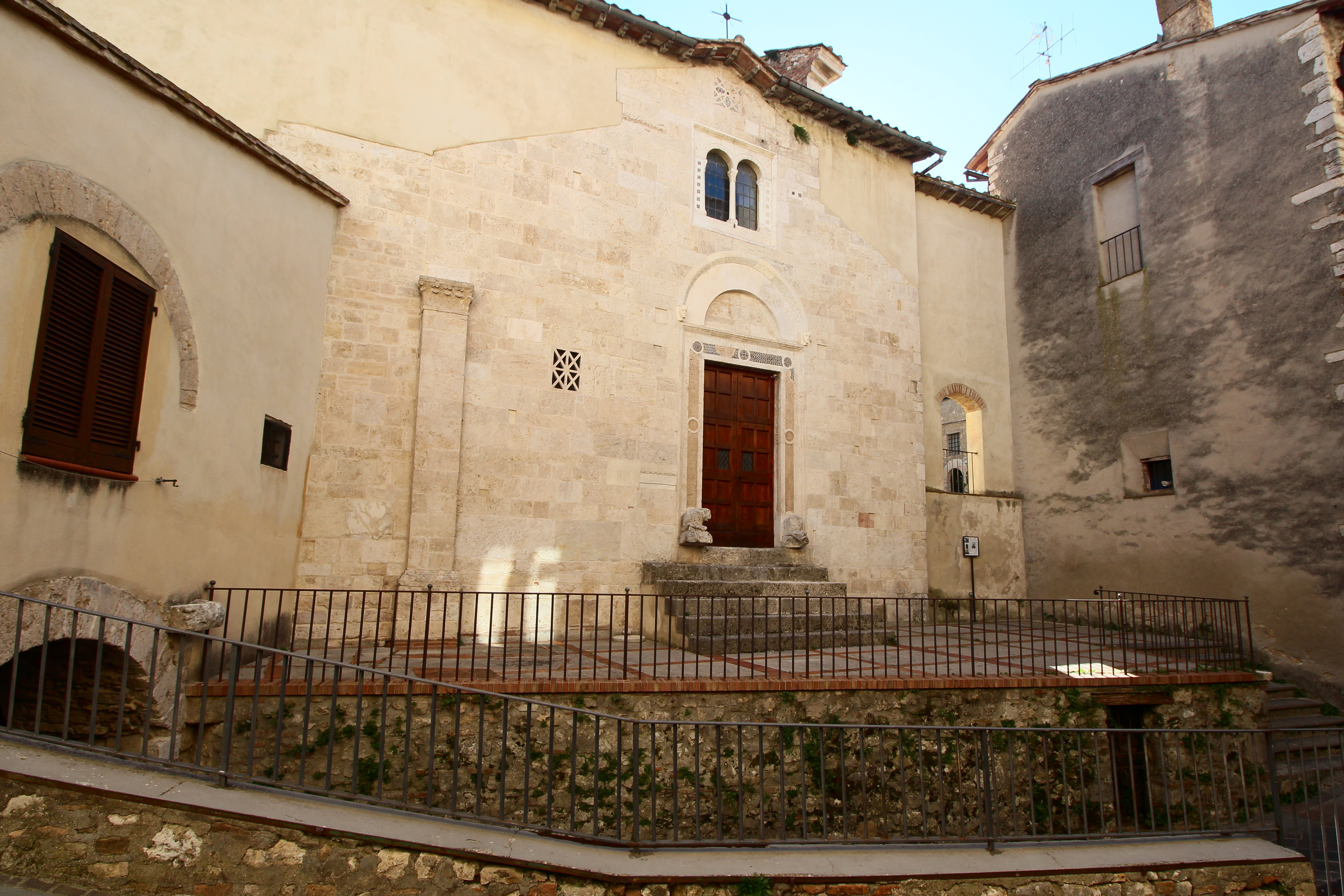
Church of San Giovanni Battista

The church of San Giovanni preserves remains of its earlier façade on the north-west side, including decorative elements and inscriptions, one of which records a foundation date of 1145. The church is a small circular building with five altars and an organ, served since 1346 by an archpriest and four canons, and officiated by the Augustinians.

=== San Francesco ===
The church of San Francesco, dating in part to the 15th century, has a decorated stone entrance, a single nave with pointed arches, and a semi-decagonal apse. It contains wooden sculptures, including a crucifix of the 16th century and a figure of Saint Sebastian from the late 15th century. The church is in Gothic style and had seven altars and an organ.

=== Santa Maria Maddalena ===
The church of Santa Maria Maddalena also had five altars and an organ and was attached to a Benedictine monastery.

=== San Nicolò ===
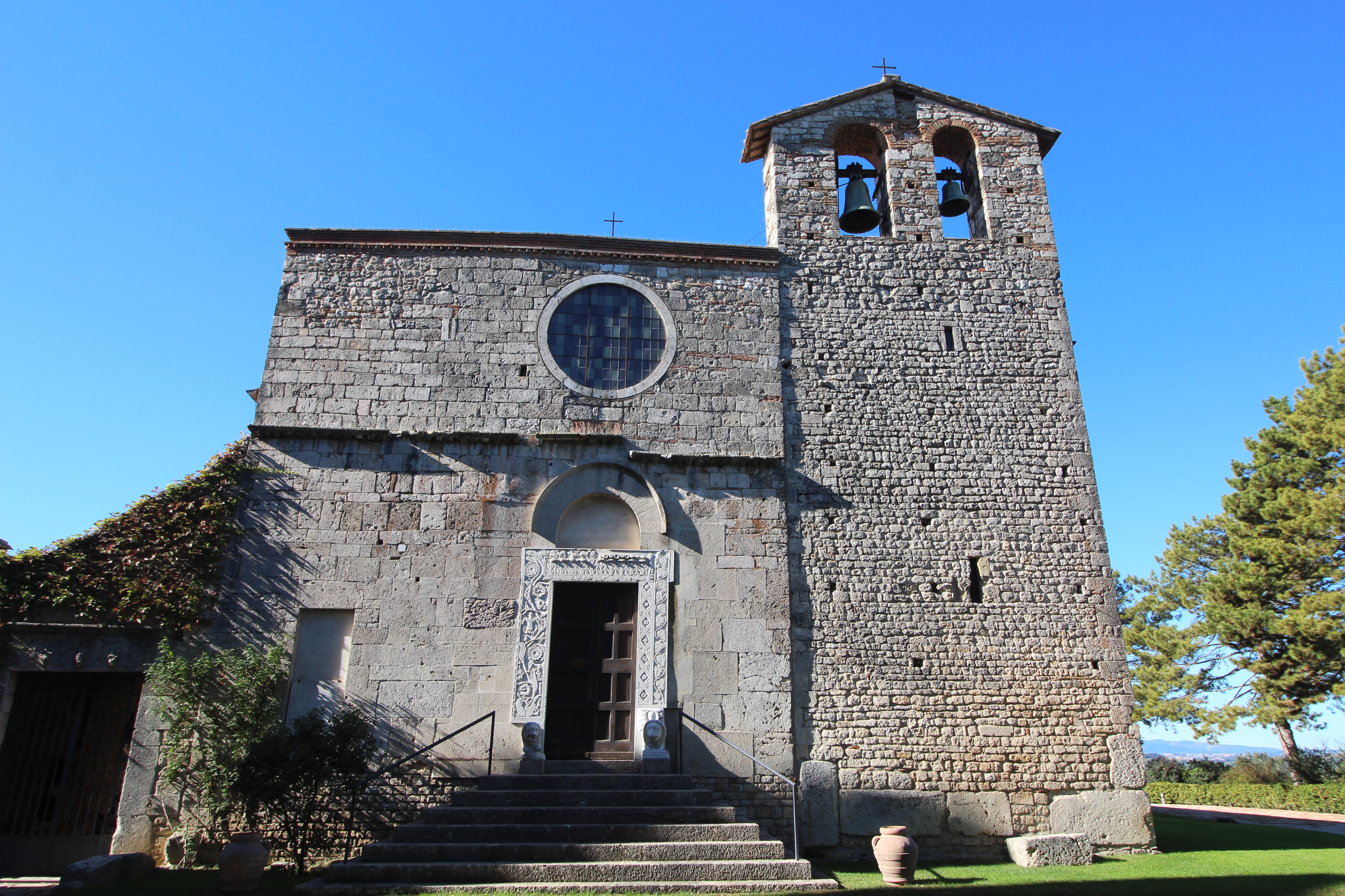
The abbey church of San Nicolò

The abbey church of San Nicolò stands near the walls of San Gemini, in the locality known as Fico Nero. The church has three naves separated by round arches that extend to a square apse. Pillars and columns support the arches, and the roof structure consists of wooden trusses.

The façade, dating to the 12th century, contains a portal with a lintel and lunette and a rose window. On the right side stands a tower that at its upper level becomes a bell gable with a double opening. The decorated portal currently in place is a copy made by the sculptor Fernando Onori of the original portal, which is preserved in the Metropolitan Museum of New York.

The apse area contains 13th-century frescoes depicting the Madonna enthroned and Pope Gregory the Great. The interior also preserves marble fragments with winged figures that may have belonged to a sarcophagus or a ciborium.

The church dates to the 11th century. Over time it acquired numerous properties and expanded its jurisdiction until the early 13th century. After damage inflicted between 1228 and 1239 by Emperor Frederick II, it was rebuilt with major alterations to the original structure: the choral space was enlarged, the façade and bell tower were constructed, and the semicircular apse was replaced with a square one aligned with the naves.

At the beginning of the 16th century the abbey entered a period of decline. Around 1800 the structure was partly collapsed, and in the early 20th century the roof had completely fallen in and the entrance had been walled up and deprived of its main portal. A major restoration in 1958 returned the church to use by the community.

=== San Carlo ===
The oratory of San Carlo contains frescoes of Umbrian school from the 15th century, depicting the Virgin with Christ and various saints.

== Other cultural sites ==
A literary academy known as the Accademia dei Nuvolosi once flourished in the town.

Geolab is a permanent exhibition devoted to geological sciences.

=== Archaeology ===
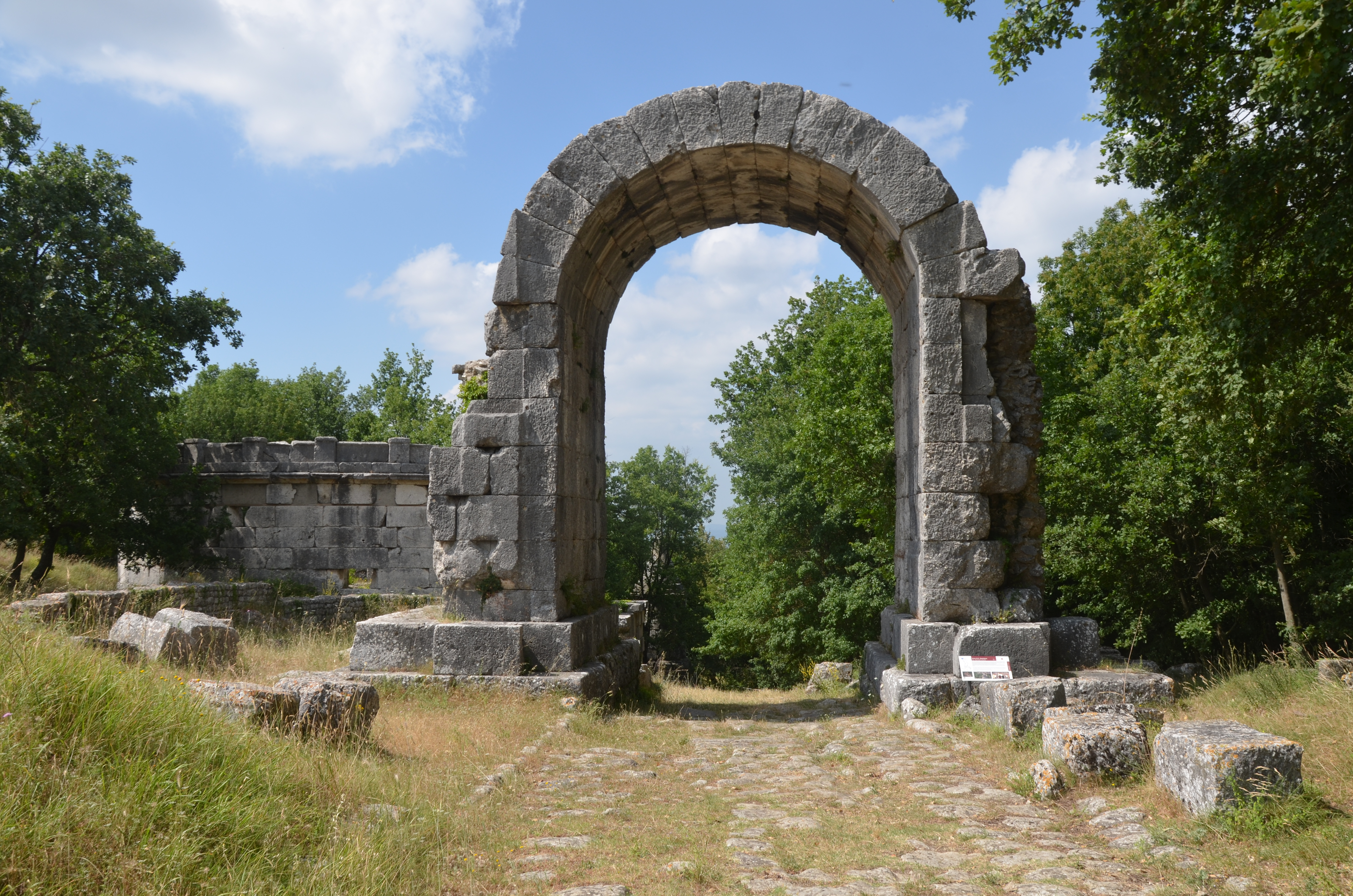
Carsulae, the northern entrance of the town on the Via Flaminia

The surrounding area preserves extensive remains of ancient Carsulae. These include a stretch of the Via Flaminia paved with polygonal stones, an arch to the north—possibly a city gate or honorary monument—and the remains of a circular funerary structure. Other visible remains include traces of roads, mosaic pavements, an amphitheater, an aqueduct, and various substructures.

The church of San Damiano stands on ancient ruins and contains fragments of Roman statues and inscriptions. About 1.5 miles (2.4 km) from the ancient city stood a suburb known as Carsorillo, also called Casuento or Casventino.

Additional remains are found to the west of the Via Flaminia, including parts of private buildings, the base and cella of a temple, and statue bases. Architectural and sculptural fragments and inscriptions are scattered throughout the area.

== Notable people ==
The territory of ancient Carsulae and San Gemini was associated with several figures, including the aedile Marcus Valerius Macrinus, Gaius Furius, quattuorvir and pontifex, Lucius Nonius Asprenas, septemvir epulonum at Rome, the Roman consul Gaius Fonteius Capito, Saint Volusianus, bishop of Terni and Carsulae in the 4th century, Saint Peter Martyr, a Franciscan killed for the faith in Morocco, and the military leader Lucantonio Volanteschi.

Natives of San Gemini included Blessed Paolo Capitone, Bishop Biagio Alvi, Matteo Grumoli, bishop of Terni, Giuseppe Sallusti, bishop of Amelia, and Carlo Maria Fabi, also bishop of Amelia.

Among the noble and ancient families of San Gemini are the Milanesi, Genuense, Lamperini, Alvi, Terzi and Fabi.
