= Charles Hallac =

Israeli-American investor and businessman

Charles S. Hallac
- Born: Charles Shaul Hallac; October 20, 1964; Tel Aviv, Israel
- Died: September 9, 2015 (aged 50); New York City, US
- Education: International School Manila; Brandeis University
- Occupation: Business executive
- Years active: 1986-2015
- Known for: First employee of BlackRock
- Spouse: Sarah Hallac
- Children: 3
- Awards: "Asset Management Risk Manager of the Year" (2001)
- Website: www.blackrock.com/corporate/about-us/leadership/charlie-hallac

Charles Shaul Hallac (October 20, 1964 – September 9, 2015) was the co-president of BlackRock.

== Biography ==
=== Early life and education ===
Charles Hallac was born in Tel Aviv and moved to the Philippines as a toddler. He grew up in a Jewish family. He graduated from International School Manila. He earned a Bachelor of Arts in economics and computer science from Brandeis University in 1986.

=== Career ===
From graduation until 1988, Hallac was an associate in the Mortgage Products Group at First Boston.

He joined BlackRock as its first employee at its inception in 1988 to build the technological and operational foundation of the firm. He purchased the first computer for the firm and created the Aladdin system and was a co-founder of BlackRock Solutions which he ran until 2009.

In 2009, Hallac became chief operating officer for BlackRock, serving until 2014.

== Awards ==
In 2001, Hallac, with his colleague, Bennett Golub, received the "Asset Management Risk Manager of the Year" award from Risk Magazine.

== Personal life ==
Charles Hallac lived with his wife and their three children in Scarsdale, New York. He died on September 9, 2015, aged 50, at Memorial Sloan-Kettering Cancer Center, four years after being diagnosed with colorectal cancer.
