= Kapito =

Kapito is a surname. Notable people with this surname include:

- Fletcher Kapito (born 1959), Malawian boxer
- Robert S. Kapito (born 1957), American businessman and investor
- Jesse A. Kapito (born 1993), American businessman and investor, CPA
- Benjamin G. Kapito (born 1995), United States Navy, First Class Petty Officer

== See also ==
- Capito (disambiguation)
