= Preqin =

British financial services company

Preqin Ltd.
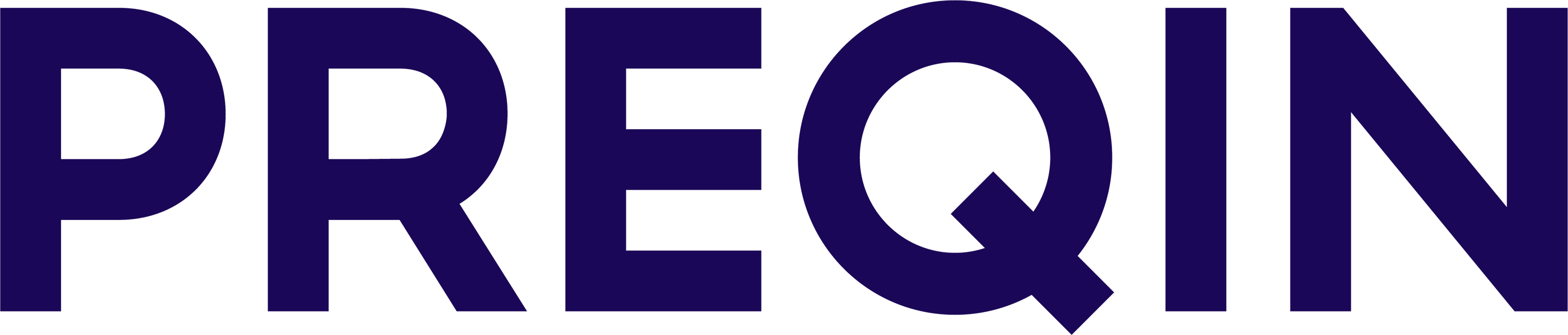
- Type: Subsidiary
- Founded: 2003; 23 years ago
- Headquarters: London
- Products: Research & data
- Number of employees: 1,500+

Preqin Ltd. is a British privately held London-based investment data company that provides financial data, research and analytics for alternative assets and private markets, as well as tools to support investment in alternatives. Since 2025, the company has operated as a subsidiary of BlackRock following its acquisition by the asset manager. The company provides data and insights covering private equity, venture capital, private debt, hedge funds, real estate, infrastructure, natural resources, and secondaries.

By the company's own definition, its data encompasses private capital and hedge funds, including fund, fund manager, investor, performance and deal information. The asset classes it covers are: private equity, venture capital, hedge funds, private debt, real estate, infrastructure, natural resources and secondaries.

Preqin competes with companies such as Pitchbook, CapitalIQ, Burgess, Octum AI, Tracxn, Crunchbase, and other financial databases.

== History ==
Launched as Private Equity Intelligence in 2003, the firm founded by Mark O’Hare and Nick Arnott began by listing private equity performance data, relying on the Freedom of Information Act (UK FOIA).

In 2018, it launched a research report titled Women in Alternatives, which detailed underrepresentation of women in the alternative assets industry. Preqin won The Queen's Award for Enterprise in International Trade in 2016 and 2019, was a national winner at the 2019 European Business Awards, and was named as part of the Sunday Times International Track 200 in the same year.

In August 2021, Preqin fully acquired Colmore, a leading private markets technology, services and administration business. On July 1, 2024, BlackRock announced that it would acquire the company for £2.55 billion, with the aim of combining its data and research tools with Aladdin.

In March 2025, it was announced that BlackRock had completed the purchase of Preqin, considering a value of US$3.2 billion for full control of the company.
