= Aladdin (BlackRock) =

Computer system operated by BlackRock Solutions

- Developer: BlackRock
- Release: 1988
- Type: Financial software
- License: Proprietary
- Website: Official website

Aladdin is an end-to-end portfolio management, risk analytics, and investment operations software platform developed by BlackRock. Used by institutional clients, including asset managers, pension funds, insurers, and wealth managers, the platform integrates portfolio construction, trading, risk management, and accounting across public and private markets. It incorporates specialised tools including eFront for private markets analytics, Aladdin Wealth, and data from Preqin.

In 2013, it handled about $11 trillion in assets (including BlackRock's $4.1 trillion assets), which was about 7% of the world's financial assets, and kept track of about 30,000 investment portfolios. As of 2020, Aladdin managed $21.6 trillion in assets.

Senior Managing Director Sudhir Nair is the current Global Head of BlackRock's Aladdin program.

== Use case ==
One of BlackRock's four data centers where Aladdin is operated is located in Wenatchee, Washington state. The network in Wenatchee consists of around 6000 computers. In 2024 and 2025, BlackRock and its affiliates have aggressively expanded investments in large-scale data center infrastructure, most notably through a consortium’s $40 billion acquisition of Aligned Data Centers.

The software uses these computers to analyze global economic data, stock market prices and numerous other economic factors. For example, sudden changes in government, weather conditions or possible disasters are also taken into account when evaluating portfolios. Aladdin is the analysis system used by BlackRock to evaluate individual investments. Its purpose is to help with risk management and it is not making trades. Aladdin is based on a pool of historical data that uses Monte Carlo simulation to select large, randomly generated samples from the very large number of possible future scenarios. This generates a statistical picture of different scenarios for equities and bonds under different future conditions. A portfolio can also be subjected to a stress test. For example, the impact of a global pandemic or a Lehman Brothers type of insolvency crisis on a portfolio of assets can be simulated in this way. Clients using Aladdin include CalPERS (California Public Employees' Retirement System) with assets of US$260 billion, Deutsche Bank with around €900 billion and Prudential plc with around US$700 billion. The Bank of Israel has also used Aladdin since 2019.

== History ==
Aladdin began in 1988 on a single workstation from Sun Microsystems. Purchased by Charles Hallac (1964–2015), this workstation stood between a refrigerator and a coffee machine in the company's one-room office at the time. Hallac is regarded as the initial architect of Aladdin. The first mathematical models for Aladdin were developed by Hallac and Benett W. Golub. Among other things, these were models for mortgage securities (collateralized mortgage obligations, CMOs), which were a new financial product at the time. Aladdin's first major deployment was in 1994 for an order from General Electric (GE). BlackRock was asked to analyze the problematic mortgage portfolio of the investment bank Kidder, Peabody & Co, which had been a GE subsidiary since 1986. At the time, the portfolio was considered one of the most complex in the world. With the help of Aladdin, BlackRock was able to complete this order without any problems and Kidder, Peabody & Co was sold to Paine Webber in the same year. Golub and other BlackRock employees realized that the analyses and models originally created using Aladdin for their own purposes were also of interest to clients. A new business division was created and in 2000 the use of Aladdin was officially offered to clients.

Due to the 2008 financial crisis, risk management became a focal point for financial investments. Very few asset managers had the appropriate personnel and expertise for this. BlackRock's offer to use Aladdin's analysis tools and databases for risk assessment met market demand and brought BlackRock a very broad customer base. The 2008 financial crisis and Aladdin played a significant role in BlackRock's dominant market position today. The US government also placed its trust in Aladdin's risk management during the 2008 financial crisis and handed over "toxic assets" worth US$130 billion to the financial services provider for management. These "junk securities" came from the government and the US Federal Reserve, from the liquidation of Bear Stearns and American International Group. During the 2008 financial crisis, BlackRock was allowed to value the balance sheet items of the now nationalized mortgage banks Fannie Mae and Freddie Mac and manage the repurchase of mortgage-backed securities for the US Federal Reserve in the amount of US$1.25 trillion. The government contracts, including those from the UK and Greece, gave BlackRock access to information that in turn flowed into Aladdin.

In 2019, BlackRock acquired eFront, a Paris-based alternative investment management software provider, for $1.3 billion in cash, integrating private markets capabilities into the Aladdin platform. In 2024, Franklin Templeton selected Aladdin to unify its investment management technology across the firm. In March 2025, BlackRock completed the acquisition of Preqin, a private markets data provider, for £2.55 billion, integrating its data into the Aladdin ecosystem. In December 2025, BlackRock announced a partnership with Amazon Web Services to make Aladdin available on AWS infrastructure, complementing its existing Microsoft Azure deployment, with general availability expected in the second half of 2026.

== Popular references ==
Adam Curtis's 2016 documentary HyperNormalisation cites the Aladdin system as an example of how modern technocrats attempt to manage the complications of the real world.

== Platform components ==
In addition to its core investment management and risk analytics platform, BlackRock has expanded Aladdin into several specialised modules:

- Aladdin Wealth — a version of the platform tailored for wealth managers and financial advisers, providing portfolio-level risk analytics, compliance tools, and cross-border product suitability analysis. In October 2025, Aladdin Wealth launched an AI-powered "Auto Commentary" feature that generates personalised portfolio narratives for advisors, with Morgan Stanley as the first client to implement it.
- Aladdin Climate — launched in 2020, a climate risk analytics module that measures both physical climate risk and transition risk to a low-carbon economy at the individual security level, using location-specific data and Paris Agreement scenario analysis.
- eFront — acquired in 2019, an alternative investment management platform covering the full lifecycle of private equity, real estate, and infrastructure investments. Offered both as a standalone product and integrated with Aladdin for a unified view across public and private markets.
- Aladdin Copilot — a generative AI tool launched in 2023, built on Azure OpenAI infrastructure, that provides natural language interfaces within the Aladdin platform to support investment decision-making.

== Technology ==
Aladdin uses the following technologies: Linux, Java, NestJs, Hadoop, Docker, Kubernetes, Zookeeper, Splunk, ELK Stack, Apache, Nginx, Sybase ASE, DataHub, Snowflake, Cognos, FIX, Swift object storage, REST, AngularJS, TREP.

Since 2021, Aladdin has increased reliance on major cloud infrastructure, notably Microsoft Azure and Snowflake, for data storage, analytics, and disaster recovery.

It was built/upgraded using Julia, i.e. "analytics modules for" were written in Julia. It has also been reported that it was written originally in C++, Java and Perl.

== Regulatory scrutiny ==
Aladdin's scale has attracted attention from financial regulators concerned about systemic risk arising from the concentration of risk management on a single platform. In January 2021, the Financial Conduct Authority (FCA) of the United Kingdom stated that the failure of a large portfolio and risk system such as Aladdin "could cause serious consumer harm" or "damage market integrity." In the United States, the Financial Stability Oversight Council (FSOC) explored in 2014 whether risk-modelling firms like BlackRock should face enhanced scrutiny, citing concerns that "financial firms may rely too heavily on the same outside risk models."

The American Economic Liberties Project, a think tank, has argued that Aladdin should be split off from BlackRock and designated as a systemically important market utility to address potential conflicts of interest between BlackRock's asset management and technology businesses. Critics have also raised concerns about "groupthink" risk, arguing that hundreds of clients relying on the same risk signals could homogenise market behaviour and amplify correlated trading during stress events. In 2021, the Los Angeles County Employees' Retirement Association cited this potential for groupthink as one reason it declined to adopt Aladdin's risk capabilities.

== Competitors ==
State Street Corporation's 2018 acquisition of Charles River Development for $2.6 billion was widely viewed as a direct response to Aladdin's market position, creating the State Street Alpha front-to-back investment management platform. In 2023, Deutsche Börse acquired SimCorp for approximately $4.3 billion and combined it with its Axioma risk analytics division, explicitly positioning the combined offering as a European alternative to Aladdin. Other competitors include Bloomberg's PORT analytics platform and MSCI's risk models.

== See also ==
- BlackRock
- SecDB (Goldman Sachs)
