= San Francesco, San Gemini =

Church in Umbria, Italy

Coordinates: 42°36′46.9″N 12°32′45.5″E

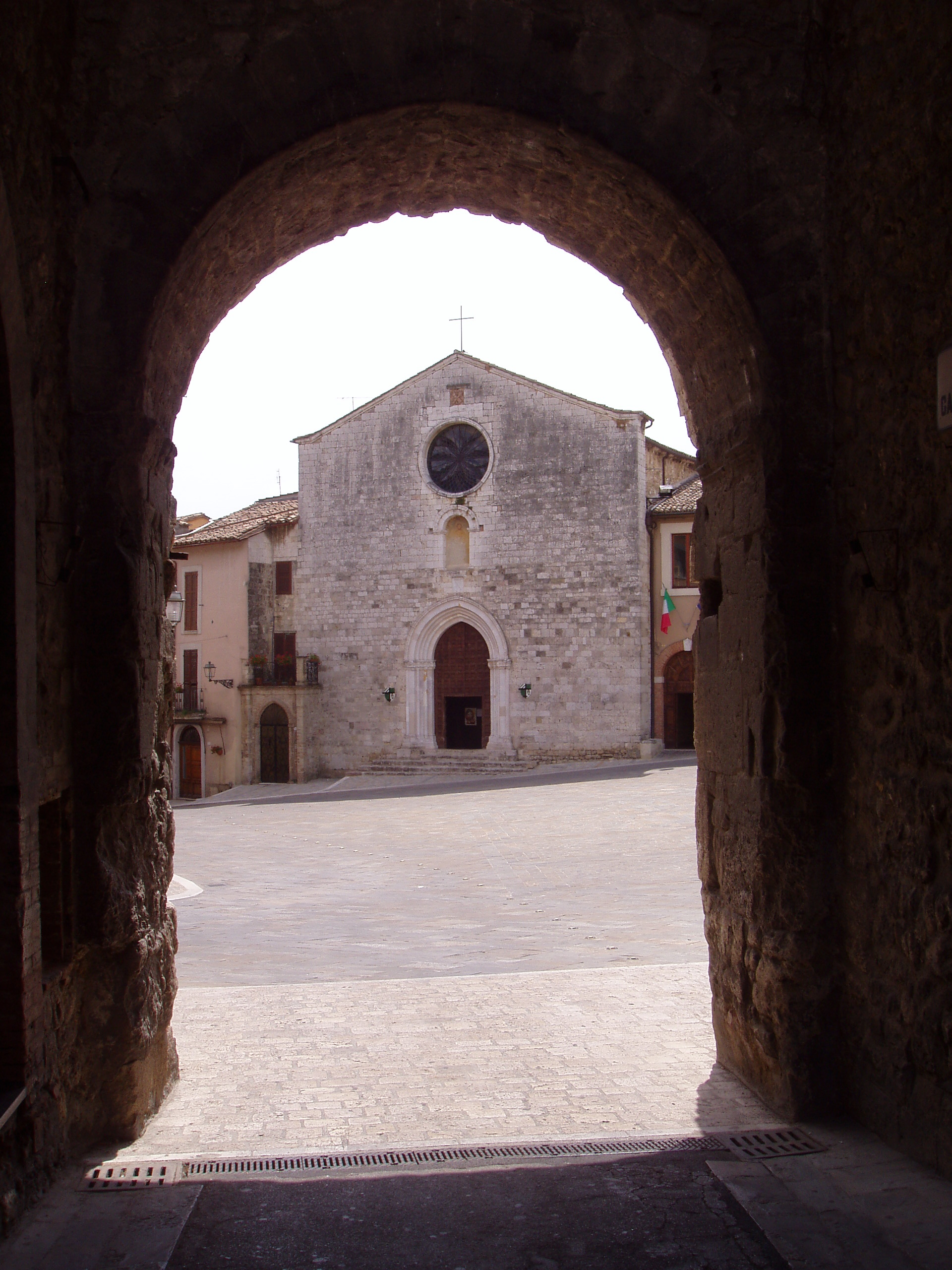
Church of San Francesco seen from Porta Burgi

San Francesco is a Gothic-style, Roman Catholic, church in a piazza of the same name in the town of San Gemini, region of Umbria, Italy. The 13-14th-century church was erected by the Franciscan order and dedicated to St Francis, who visited the town at least twice in his lifetime.

== History ==
According to Tommaso da Celano's Life of Saint Francis^{,} (Giovanni di Pietro di Bernardone), whose nickname was Francesco (b.1181 – d.1226) visited San Gemini two times. The first time in 1213, when he was the guest of Count Pietro Capitoni whose wife was possessed by a demon. The saint performed a miracle by ordering the demon to leave the woman.

Sometime after the death of San Francis, in 1226 the Capitoni family donated the land for Church and Franciscan monasteries. Francis of Assisi in his lifetime became an extremely popular preacher, particularly in Umbria, and in practically every town there were groups of his followers. Soon after his death and canonization in 1228, Franciscan churches and monasteries were being built. This church was originally located outside the city walls, facing the main city gate (porta Burgi) and an area that was used as the main market ground. It was common at the time for monastic complexes to be located outside of the city boundaries, in order to maintain greater independence from the local bishops. The Capitoni family was the main patron during construction of the church, their coat of arms is shown prominently in the capitals of the entrance door jambs.

Construction of the church probably starts in the second half of the 13th century, in a Romanesque style, and is not completed until the beginning of the 14th century, when it takes the form of a simple Franciscan-Gothic style church.. The apse and the front portal, which are done in a more elaborate gothic style, are probably the last components to be built. At this time the church had three gothic style side chapels along the left side wall.

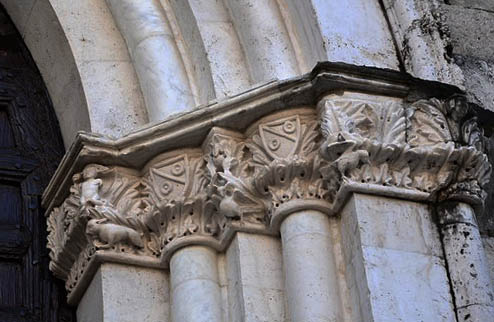
Door jamb with Capitoni coat of arms

The church seems to have gone through three major renovations: one in the 15th century, in the 18th century and in 1953–55.

== 15th century Renovation ==
In the 15th century the three side chapels are closed and are replaced by a single large side chapel that corresponds to the large semicircular arch in the center of the left side. On the opposite wall a series of altars are built, they probably are similar to the existing one with the statue of the Madonna and child. In this period probably all the 14th century fresco decorations are painted over and the church takes a more sober Renaissance interior décor.

== The 18th century Renovation ==
Sometime after the 1703 earthquake, the church is renovated under the sponsorship of the Santa Croce, the feudal lords of San Gemini. At the same time the adjacent Franciscan Monastery is rebuilt and takes its present aspect. Some new elements are introduced in the church, at least three new side altars built in masonry and stucco in a baroque style. At some later point, perhaps the mid-19th century, two wooden 17th century altars are introduced. They appear not to be made for this church but moved from another location (perhaps the church of Santo Gemine, whose interiors are completely redone in mid-19th century). At this time, it seems that the apse's decorations are redone with new wall and vault paintings, in the front of the church over the entrance a wood choir is built, and the rose window is replaced with a rectangular one. The altar is redone, and a low wall separates the presbytery from the apse, and the bell tower is repaired or rebuilt. The interior walls of the church were probably decorated with painted to imitate stonework and architectural elements.

After the unification of Italy, the church and the monastery were seized by the new Italian state as part of the 1866 law confiscating church properties. The monastery became a public school and still is the Middle school of San Gemini. The church became a warehouse and was bought back by the parish and reopened as a church in 1898. At this time much of the interior was whitewashed.

== Renovations after the 1950s ==
The approach taken at the time was to bring back the church to its original medieval state mostly by the removal of the additions and decorations introduced in the 18th century. Three masonry and stucco altars. Since little remained of the medieval decoration, the result of this approach is that the interior walls are blank with a few fragments of mural paintings. The 18th century altar and separation walls were removed, all 18th century wall and ceiling paintings were stripped from the walls, a new gothic style window was added in the apse, and the rose window was reconstructed from some remaining fragments. The floor of the church is all new except for the crypt hatches. New heating and electrical systems where introduced into the building. In the 1960s, a free-standing altar is added. From 1994, to 2020, the Associazione Valorizzazione del Patrimonio Storico Onlus and Massimo Violati sponsor the restoration of the entrance door jambs, the restoration by Bruno Bruni of the Ceramic bust of San Bernardino, and the restoration of the 14th century wood entrance doors.

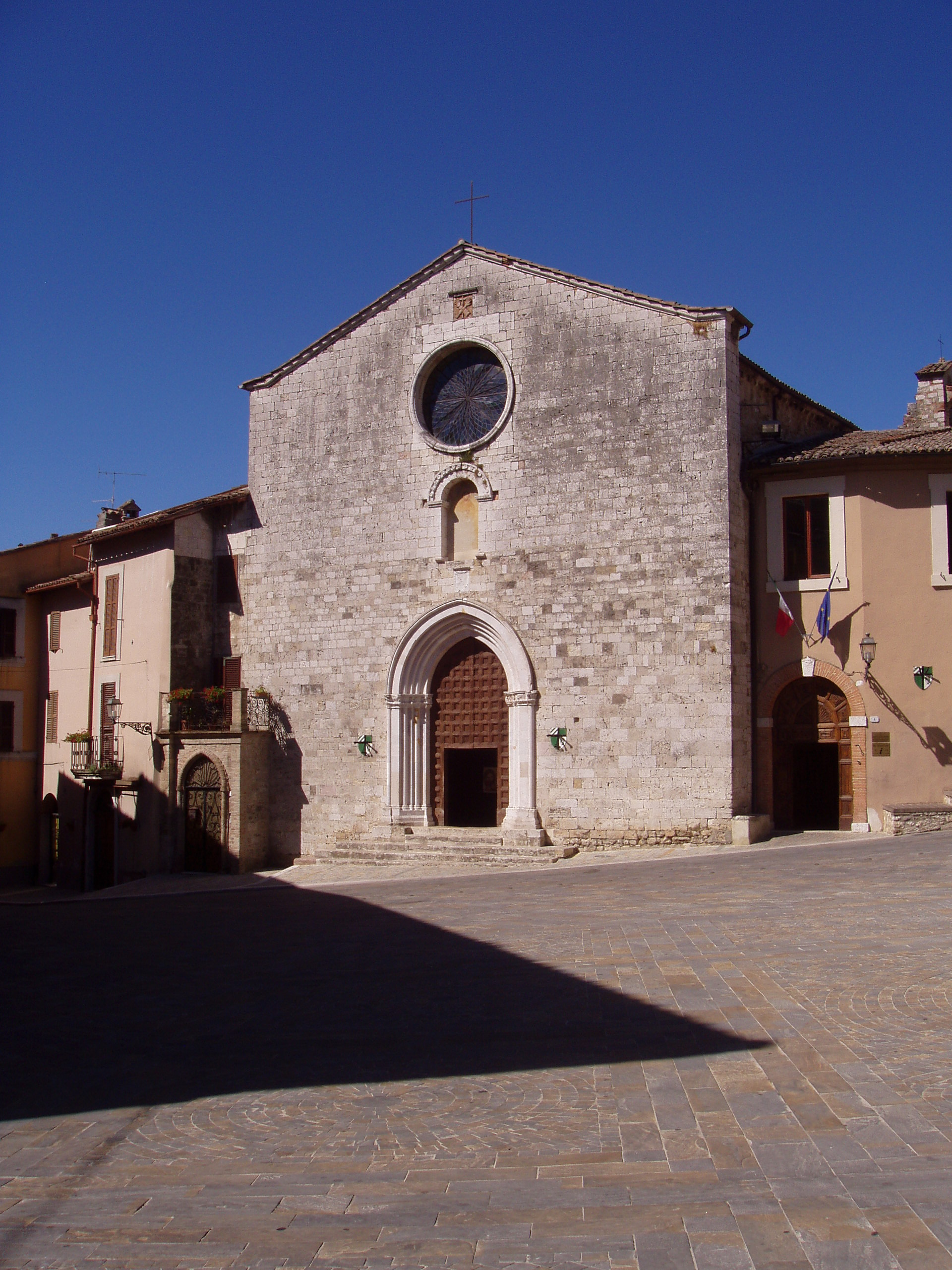
Front facade

In 2020, the San Gemini Preservation Studies Program and the Associazione Valorizzazione del Patrimonio Storico Onlus will start a campaign to restore the front façade of the church, involving the cleaning and pointing of the stone masonry.

== Architecture and Interior Decoration ==
This simple white limestone façade is a good example of plain the Franciscan-Gothic architecture, it expresses their religious ideology of poverty and simplicity. The façade has very limited decorative elements mostly around the portal. Originally the rose windows probably had an elaborate tracery pattern that is now lost. The decorated door jambs, like the apse, show a richer quality of gothic details that probably came at the end of the construction. On the capitals of the engaged columns one finds the coat of arms of the Capitoni family, indicating their patronage of the church. The wooden exterior doors are original from the 14th century.

Above the portal there is an arched niche with a mural depicting Saint Francis painted in the 1950s by the local painter Tullio Bertozzi. Above the niche there is the reconstructed rose window, the rim of which is in part original, the rest was rebuilt in 1953. Above the window is the coat of arms of the Franciscan order, a cross with the two hands of Sant Francis with the stigmata.

The interior of the church is a simple uninterrupted rectangular space. Opposite to the entrance is the octagonal apse and the presbytery. There are no side isles, though originally there were three chapels along the right-side wall, which are now walled in. The church is all on one level, the presbytery is slightly raised to improve visibility. This organization of the church, introduced by Franciscans, is a break with the medieval tradition of the 3-level church (entrance level church, cryptal chapel and raised presbytery). The roof is supported by a series of transversal pointed arches in brick construction that rest on stone brackets on the side walls. They support the roof directly without an attic level. This type of structure allowed the builders to have a wide span to cover a large open space. This new organization of the church, which allowed the congregation to gather all in a single uninterrupted space, in part reflects a more egalitarian philosophy of the Franciscan Order but also the increasing importance of preaching and sermon-giving with the Franciscan religious movement.

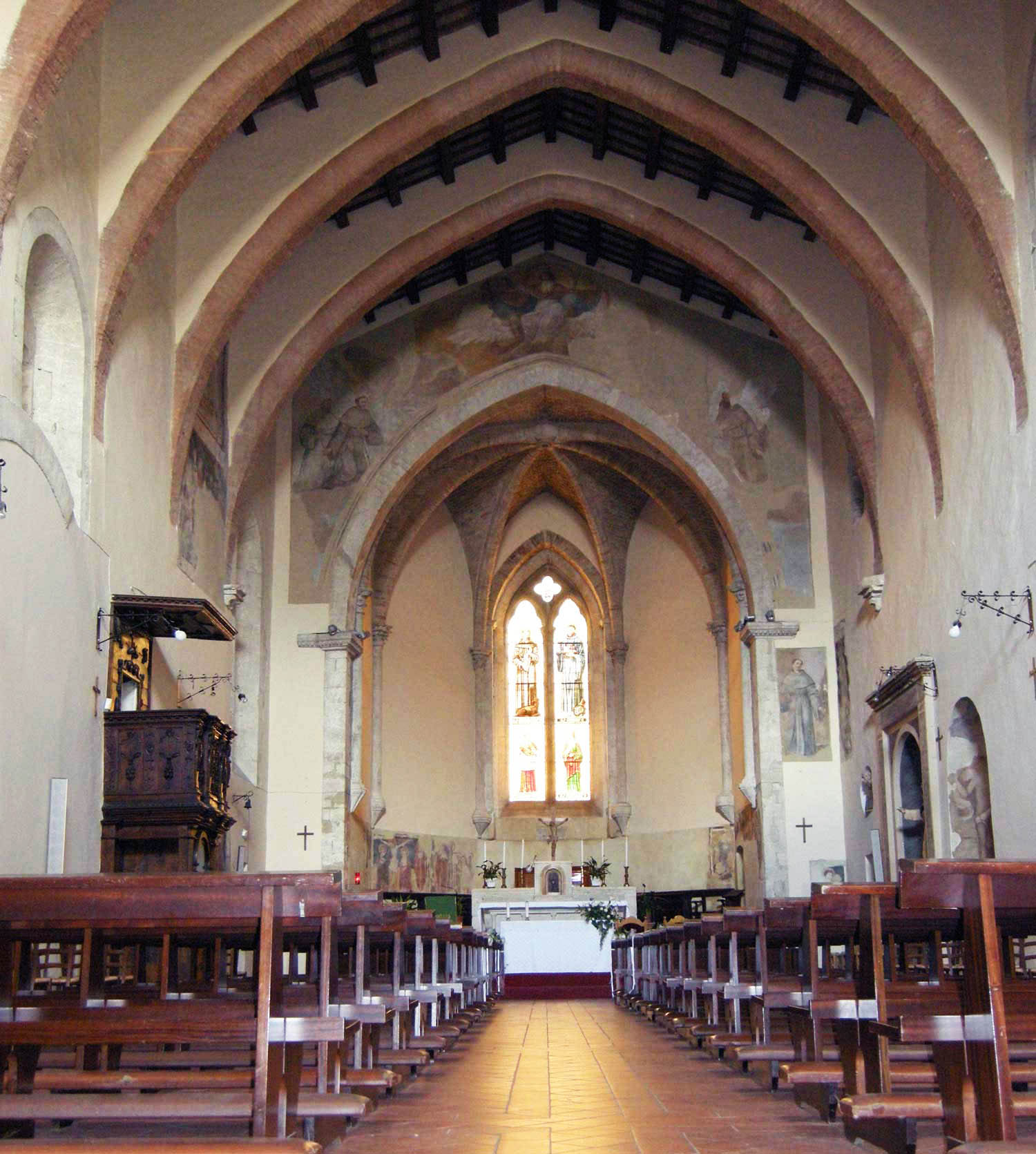
Interior

Presently the interior walls are mostly in undecorated plaster with fragments of fresco paintings from different periods. Originally the 14th century walls would typically be covered with fresco paintings. It seems that the base of the walls had images of saints framed by red, white and black stripe borders. The upper part of the walls would typically have painting cycles depicting, on the left side, stories from the old and new testament and, on the right wall, stories from the life of Saint Francis.

The wooden entrance vestibule in the counterfacade was probably made in the 18th century. There was a wooden choir platform over the entrance up to the 1953 when it was removed. On the inside of the façade wall we have multiple fresco fragments overlaying each other. On the right side one can see a fragment of a 15th-century adoration of the magi that is very deteriorated, also a 15th-century Madonna and child and other fragmented images of saints.

Left side (when looking at altar) Four stone arches reveal the previous existence of side chapels that are presently closed off with masonry walls; the first three are in gothic style from the XIII-XIV centuries, the central round arch is in a 15th-century Renaissance style. The windows on the upper wall vary in style and reveal that the church was first started in a Romanesque style in the 13th century with round arches and were later adapted to include a trilobed gothic motif in the 14th century when the Gothic style had taken root. Churches in this period were built slowly over many decades and often show variations in the architectural styles that take place during their construction.

On the left side there is a 17th-century wood pulpit with caryatids installed on top a more recent confessional; it is accessed from the sacristy. Beyond the pulpit there is a painted crucifixion 14th century style framed by a painted Gothic arch under the cross, there in a reliquary coffin built into the wall behind an iron grate. In the coffin there is a wooden sculpture of the dead Christ. Above, In the upper wall there are two frescos from the early 15th century: the upper one depicting the Madonna in Throne and the lower one depicting the saints Cosma and Damian with the rest of the image missing.

The right wall (when facing the altar)

Four niches with fragmental mural decorations remain from old altars or shrines that have since been removed. From the front to back St. Luci between Saint John Baptist and Saint Rocco made in 15th century, a crucifixion between Saint Gerome and Saint Leonard dated 1599, The incredulity of St Thomas 16th century, beyond there is a side altar originally from the 15th century with a modern statue of the Virgin Mary and Child, beyond in a round niche is a newly restored 15th century ceramic bust of San Bernardino that was originally located at the Oratory of San Bernardino (now Bar Paretti on via Roma).

The front wall

On the wall around the apse opening we find a series of 17th century frescos depicting Franciscan Saints among which Saint Anthony of Padua.

The Apse and Altar

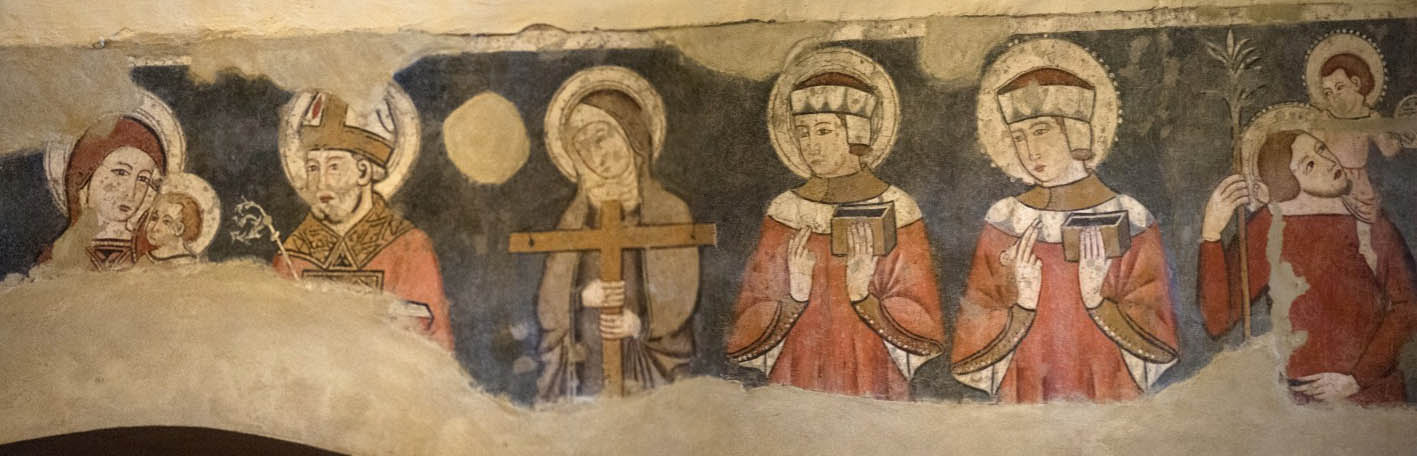
14th Century fresco on apse wall

The apse of the church is five sides and is covered by radiating Gothic vaults which spring from the top of engaged columns resting on stone brackets located about a third of the way up the side of the walls. The columns, capitals and ribs of the apse are in a more elaborate style stonework similar to what is found on the front portal of the church. It was probably done at the same time and by the same masonry crews of the portal. The rear Gothic style window with stained glass depicting St. Francis St. Gemine, St. Rocco and St. Matilda is new and was all done in the 1950s. The masonry vaults and upper walls are now bare. The mural paintings, probably 18th century, were removed in 1953. In the lower part of the apse wall some interesting fragments of the 14th century fresco decorations are still visible, one can see on the right-side Saint Francis depicted, also Saint Cristofer and the Saints Cosmas and Damian. On the opposite side there is a fresco of the crucifixion.

The present altars are new: the rear larger one was built during the 1953 renovation. The smaller free standing one was added in the 1960s after Vatican II council a new freestanding altar is added to church.

Bell tower

The bell tower is attached to the rear of the church on the right side. It was built after the original structure and the base is rectangular. Originally the top probably had a roof with arched openings around the bells. The present sail-type top was built in the 18th century, probably after being damaged during the 1703 earthquake.
