= Blake Grossman =

American businessman

Blake Grossman (1962) is the former chief executive officer (CEO) of Barclays Global Investors, the investment management arm of Barclays Bank, the British financial institution.

== Biography ==
Blake Grossman is a native of Canoga Park, California (outside of Los Angeles). He earned his master's degree in economics from Stanford in 1985, where he studied under William Sharpe, the Nobel Prize-winning economist. He was the Chief Executive Officer of Barclays Global Investors, the institutional asset management subsidiary of Barclays PLC. In June it was announced that BlackRock Inc had reached an agreement to acquire Barclays Global Investors. Upon closing of that transaction, Grossman became a Vice Chairman of BlackRock, overseeing the firms Index and Scientific Active investment business, only to leave one year later.
