= San Giovanni Battista, San Gemini =

Church building in San Gemini, Italy

Coordinates: 42.614878°N 12.548024°E

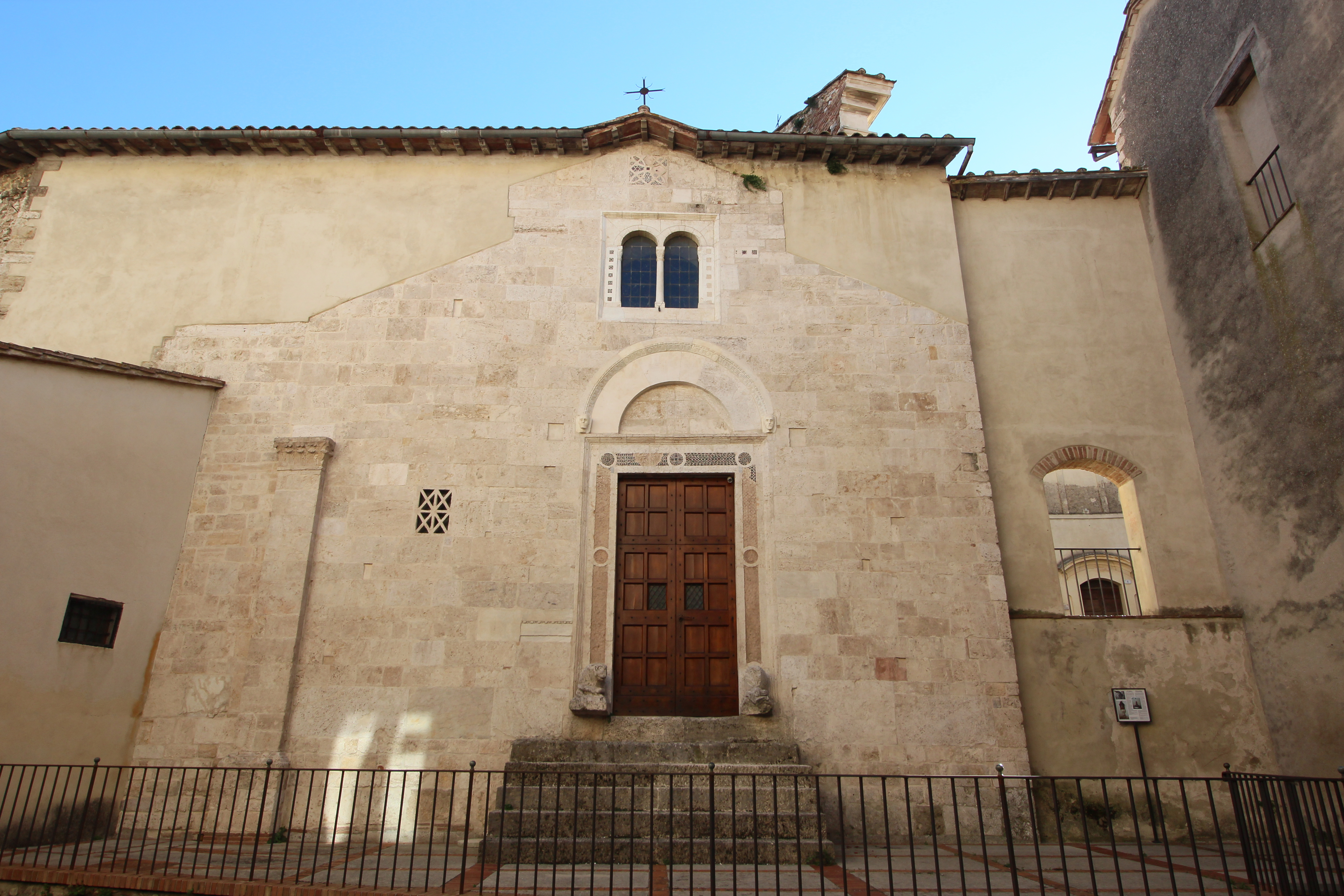
San Giovanni Battista

San Giovanni Battista is a Romanesque-style, Roman Catholic church located in front of Piazetta Garibaldi in San Gemini, in the Province of Terni, region of Umbria, Italy.

This church was formerly associated with an Augustinian monastery. Inscriptions record that the building was erected in 1199 by the architects Nicola Simone e Bernardo. The portal is carved with decoration. The lunette over the portal includes symbols of the Guelphs and Ghibellines. The interior has large octagonal pilasters. The main altarpiece depicts a Madonna of the Rosary (1618) by Simone Cibori; the altar on the left has a Madonna della Cintura (Pregnant Madonna) attributed to Giovanni Battista Manna; and the altar on the right has a depiction of Ste Rita of Cascia. The baptismal font dates to the 16th century.
