= San Gemini Cathedral =

Roman Catholic cathedral in San Gemini, Italy

Coordinates: 42.6117°N 12.5469°E

Santo Gemine is a gothic-style, Roman Catholic cathedral located in San Gemini, Province of Terni, region of Umbria, Italy.

== History ==
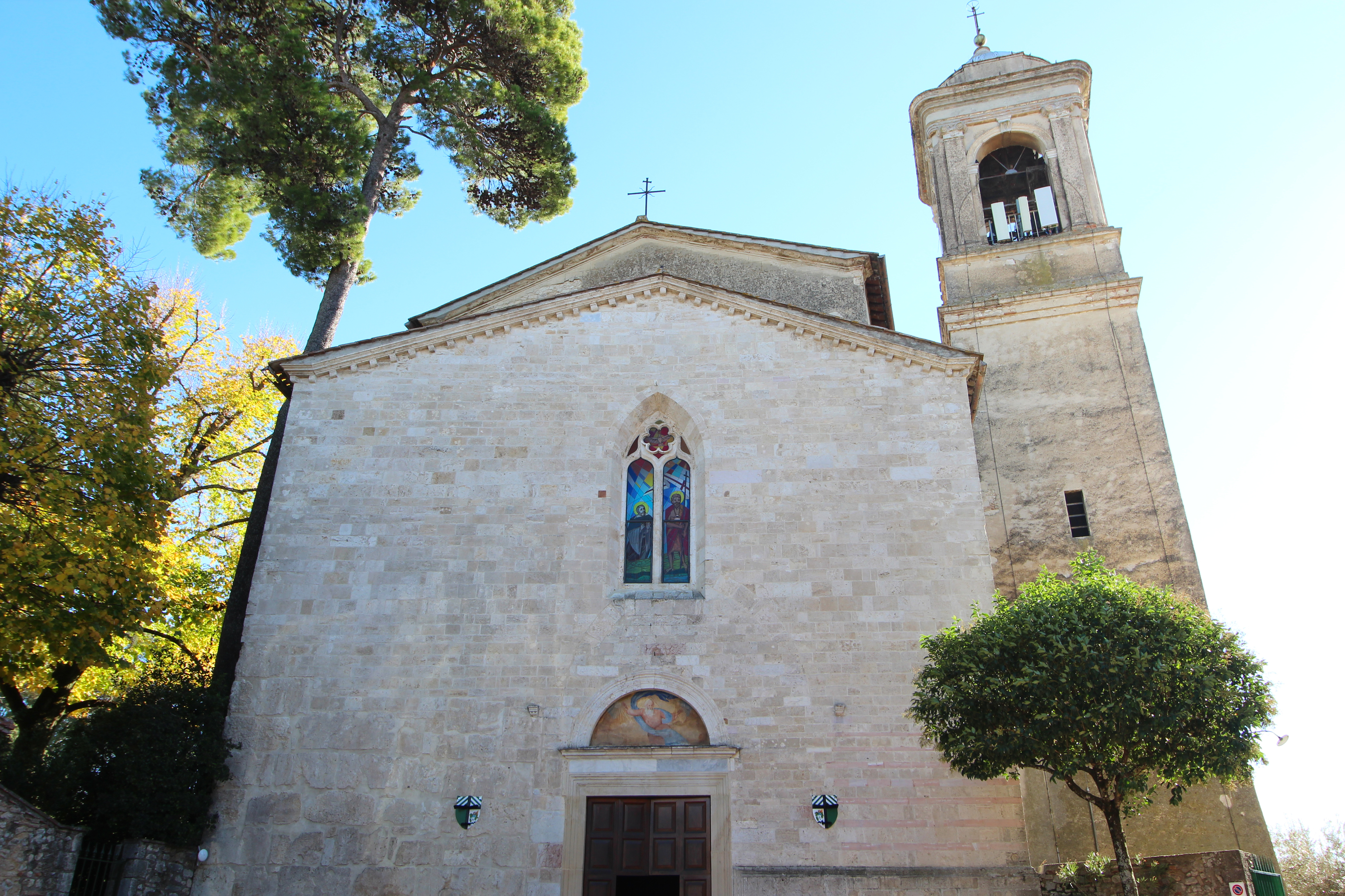
San Gemini Cathedral

A cathedral at the site dated supposedly to the 4th century, but this was reconstructed in the 10th century to accommodate the relics of St Gemine. Construction extended past the gothic period, and thus the church is an eclectic accumulation of styles. The facade has a romanesque simplicity and cornice, with a gothic window in place of the oculus, and a renaissance-style cornice; all this standing beside a baroque bell-tower. In addition, it underwent a major reconstruction in Neoclassical-style between 1817 and 1847 under the engineer Matteo Livoni, with Antonio Canova as a consultant. The apse has neoclassical frescoes.

The facade has a 15th-century portal, while the presbytery houses canvases depicting:

- Martyrdom of St Sebastian
- Madonna and child with Saintly Bishop
- St Matthew Evangelist
- Ecstasy of St Rita (18th century)

The church also shelters in an urn the relics of Santo Gemine, patron of the city. St Gemine, like St Gregory the Great, patron of Spoleto, was a Christian hermit from Syria who settled in the area.
