= 50 Hudson Yards =

Office skyscraper in Manhattan, New York

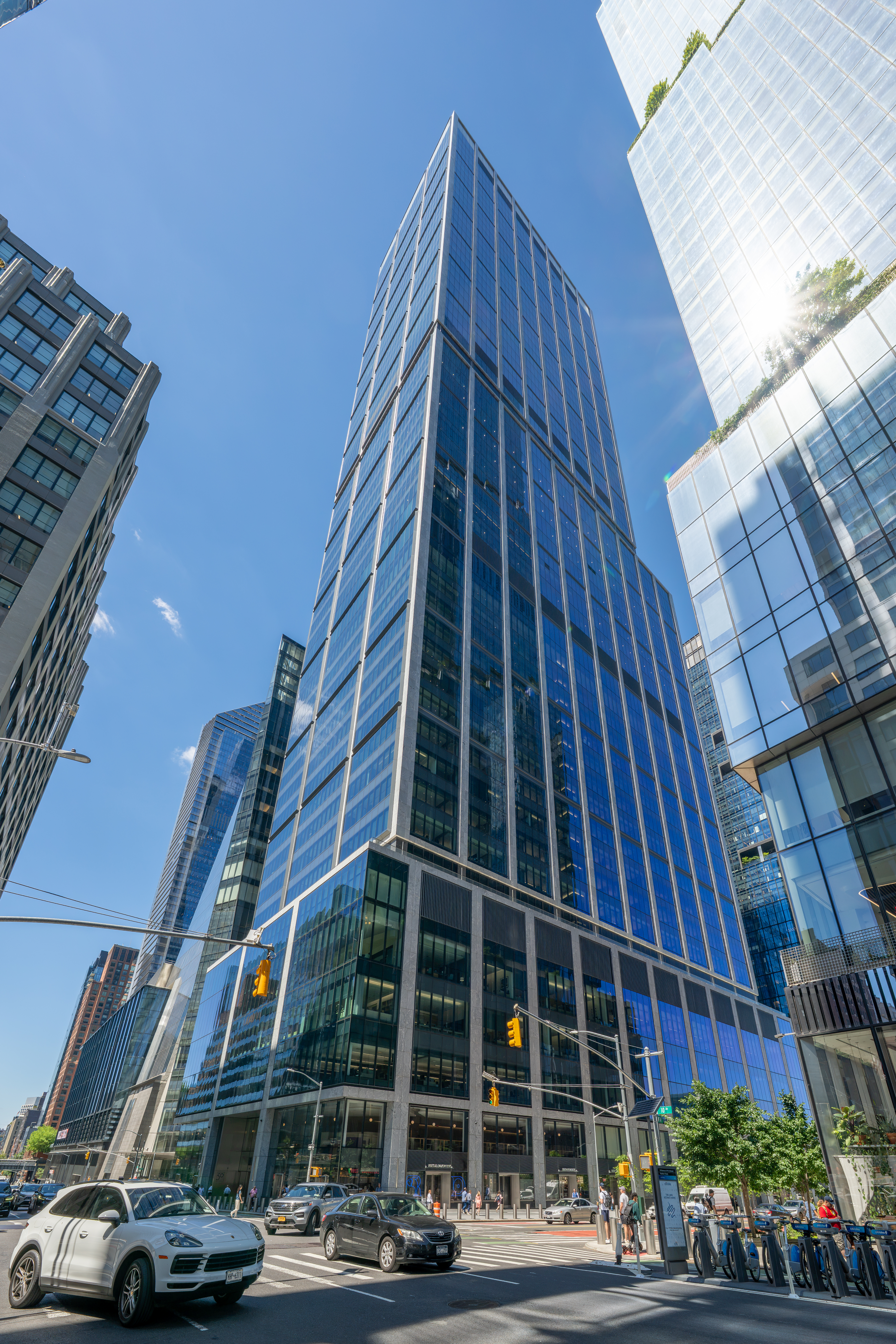
- 50 Hudson Yards, 2026

General information
- Status: Completed
- Type: Office
- Architectural style: Contemporary modern
- Coordinates: 40.754339°N 74.000001°W
- Current tenants: BlackRock Inc; Meta Platforms Inc; ServiceNow; Truist Financial; XTX Markets
- Construction started: May 2018
- Opened: October 19, 2022
- Cost: US$3.9 billion

Height
- Roof: 1,011 ft (308 m)
- Top floor: 981 ft (299 m)

Technical details
- Floor count: 58
- Floor area: 2,900,000 square feet (270,000 m^{2})
- Lifts/elevators: 32

Design and construction
- Architects: Foster + Partners, AAI Architects, P.C. (as architect of record)
- Developer: Mitsui Fudosan; Related Companies; Oxford Properties Group Inc.
- Structural engineer: WSP Global
- Civil engineer: Langan

Website
- 50hudsonyards.com

Map of buildings and structures at Hudson Yards. Zoom the map and click on points for more details.

50 Hudson Yards is a 58-story, 1,011-foot (308 m)-tall building that was developed as part of the Hudson Yards Redevelopment Project in Hudson Yards, Manhattan, New York City. The building is located to the north of 30 Hudson Yards, and on the east side of the Hudson Park and Boulevard, adjacent to 55 Hudson Yards. The building opened on October 19, 2022.

50 Hudson Yards ranks as the fourth-largest office tower in New York City in terms of available leasable area, with 2.9 million square feet (270,000 m^{2}) of commercial space. The building is located at the southwest corner of 34th Street and 10th Avenue.

== History ==
In April 2014, new renderings of a 62-story, 2.3-million-square-foot (210,000 m^{2}) building were released. The tower was shown at a height of 1,068 feet (326 m). The building's plans were also changed; the building, originally meant to be step-like structure with a white facade, was updated to reflect a three-part structure with three rectangular components, each one smaller than the one below it.

In December 2016, after a revised plan for the building was released with asset manager BlackRock set to take 847,000 square feet (78,700 m^{2}) as the anchor tenant, new renderings for the building, designed by Foster + Partners were revealed. In September 2017, developer Related Companies obtained $3.8 billion in financing for the new tower, including a $1.5 billion loan. Mitsui Fudosan owns a 90 percent stake in the building. Bank of China, Deutsche Bank, HSBC, Sumitomo Mitsui and Wells Fargo contributed financing for the tower.

Work on the foundation of 50 Hudson Yards began in May 2018. In August 2018, the height of the building was increased slightly, from 985 ft (300 m) to 1,011 ft (308 m).

In October 2022, Related and Oxford Properties borrowed about $349 million for 50 Hudson Yards from Wells Fargo. The building officially opened the same month.

== Tenants ==
Before construction on 50 Hudson Yards began, BlackRock agreed to move its headquarters to the building in 2016, as the anchor tenant. The agreed upon lease spans 15 floors of the building. BlackRock expanded its lease in the building by 50,000 square feet in mid-2024.

In November 2019, it was announced that Meta, then known as Facebook, would occupy 1.2 million square feet (110,000 m^{2}) of space in 50 Hudson Yards. This lease represents 80% of the total space that Facebook would occupy at Hudson Yards. In 2022, it was reported Meta would sublease a portion of floors due to cost-cutting measures.

In September 2022, it was announced that Truist Financial had signed a lease for 100,000 square feet in the building. Russ & Daughters and Starbucks opened locations in the building in 2023.

== Design and location ==
The building was designed by Foster + Partners, the largest architectural firm in the UK, and the interiors were designed by Tony Ingrao. Its facade, made of glass and hand-carved Italian marble, features three stacked rectangular components of diminishing size. In January 2019, the developers unveiled two unnamed starburst-shaped sculptures made of painted steel, aluminum and fiberglass, crafted by American artist Frank Stella which sit in the building's lobby. An elliptical staircase designed by Norman Foster surrounds Stella’s interlocking star sculpture. Additionally, a pair of large-scale abstract sculptures rendered from painted steel, aluminum and fiberglass, can be found hanging from the ceiling in the ground-level lobby area and are also works of Frank Stella.

The building replaced a drive-through McDonald's that had long occupied the southwest corner of 34th Street and 10th Avenue. Its entrance is directly across from the 34th Street–Hudson Yards station of the New York City Subway's 7 Subway Extension, served by the 7 and <7> trains. It connects to the subway station and The Shops & Restaurants at Hudson Yards through an underground tunnel.

== See also ==
- List of tallest buildings in New York City
