= San Carlo, San Gemini =

Church

Coordinates: 42°36′51″N 12°32′51″E

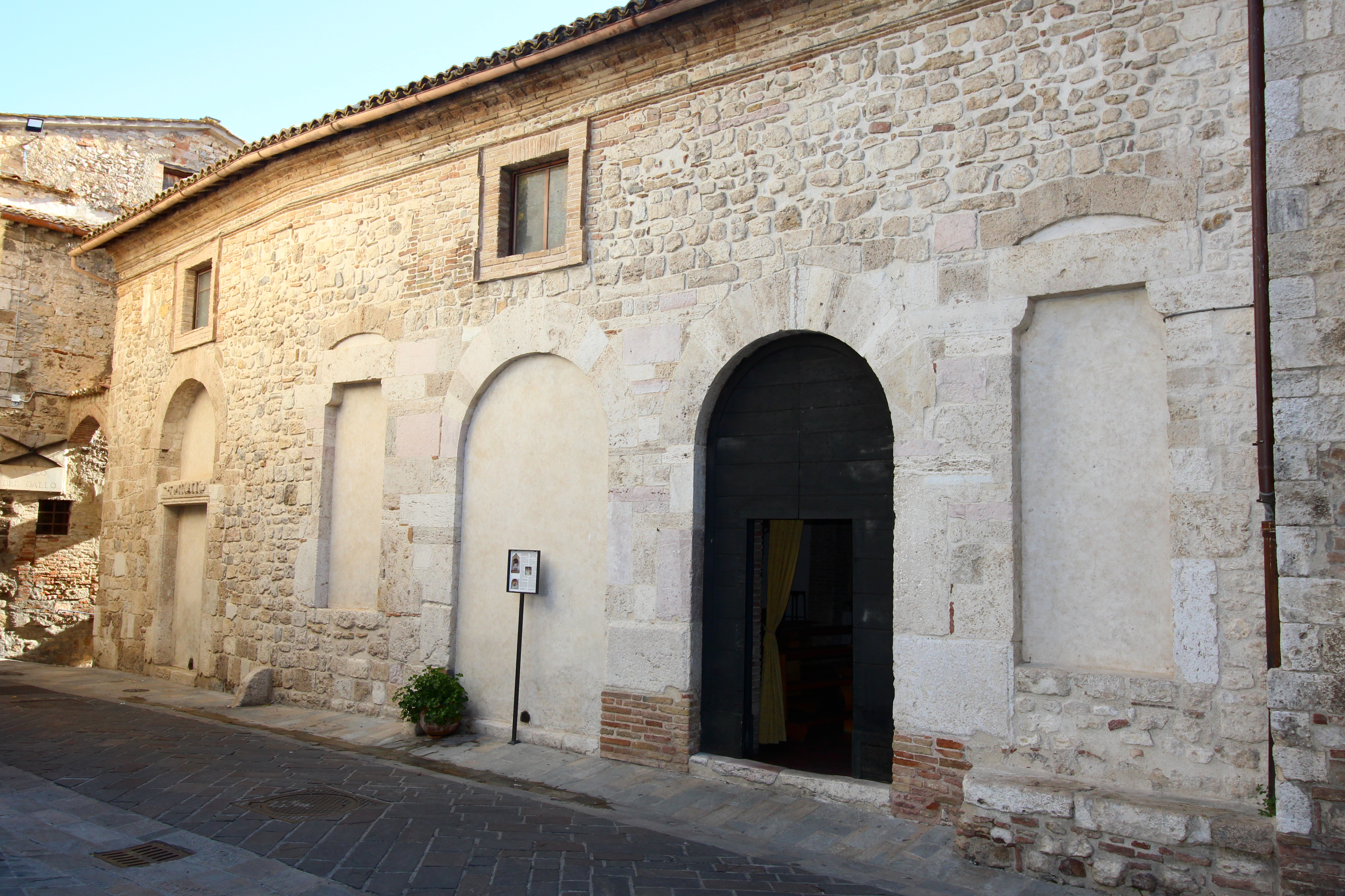
Facade

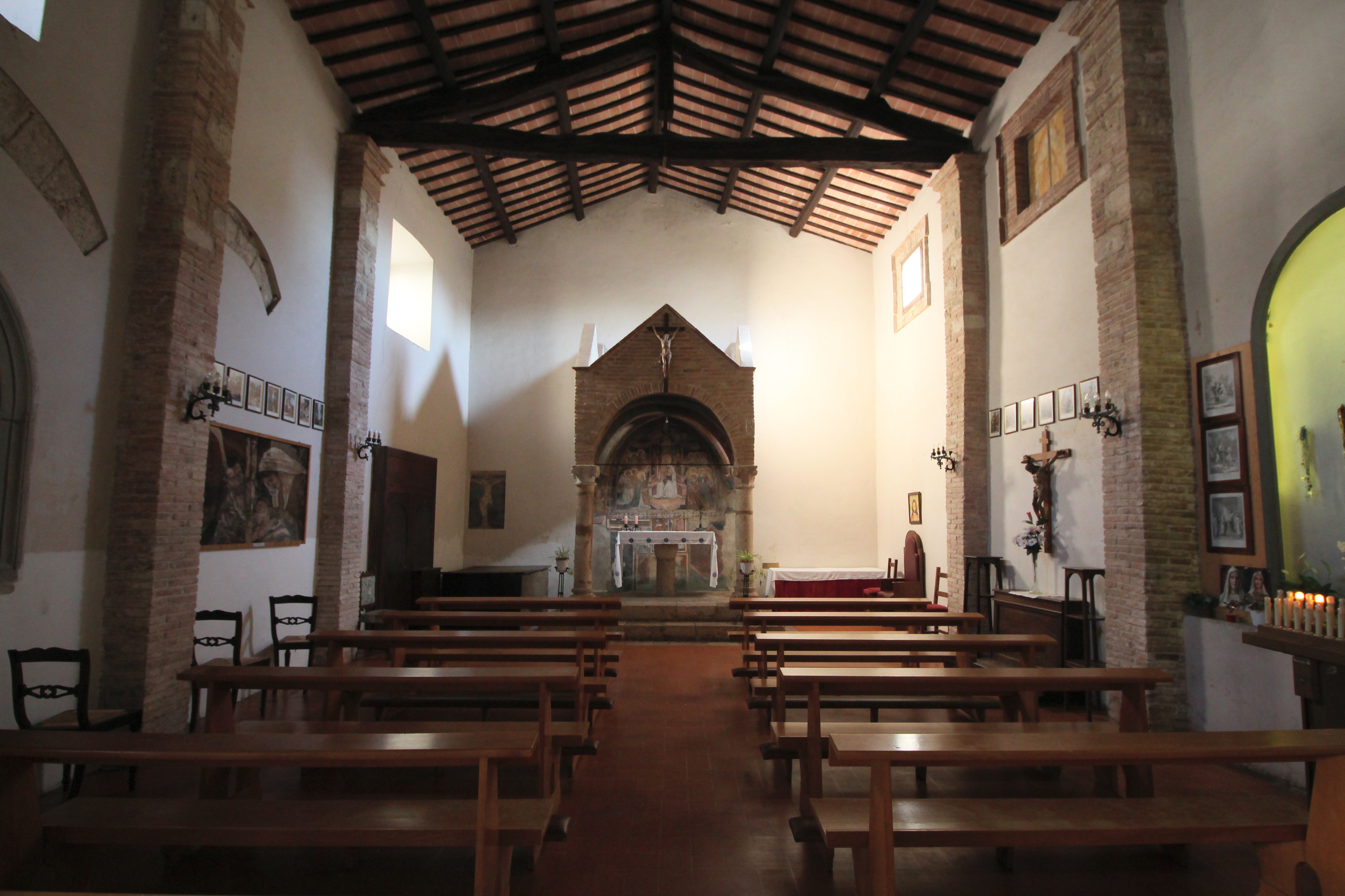
Interior

San Carlo is a Renaissance-style, church located facing the Piazza Palazzo Vecchio in San Gemini, Province of Terni, region of Umbria, Italy.

== History and description ==
This small 15th-century church was built to shelter a local aedicule dedicated to the Virgin, and the structure was once dedicated to Santa Maria de Incertis, but later was rededicated to the bishop of Milan, later Saint Cardinal Carlo Borromeo, who once officiated mass here.

The exterior facing the piazza was represented by two round stone arches and two flanking windows, of which only one arch has not been closed off. The interior space is a single nave with wood roof.

The interior houses a main altar, roofed by an elaborate ciborium, with the posterior wall possessing a large, well-restored 15th-century fresco depicting an Enthroned Madonna, Saints, and Angels, painted by a follower of Boccati. Nearby, among other quattrocento frescoes, is a 15th-century fresco depicting the Enthroned Madonna with Sts Sebastian and Stephen. The church also has two canvases depicting Miracles of St Anthony of Padua (Miracle of the Mule and Sermon to the Fishes) attributed to Giovanni Baglione.
