= Capito (footballer) =

São Toméan footballer

Personal information
- Full name: Jakson Da Trindade
- Date of birth: 13 June 1994 (age 32)
- Position: Forward

Team information
- Current team: Praia Cruz

Senior career*
Years	Team	Apps	(Gls)
- Praia Cruz

International career^{‡}
2019–	São Tomé and Príncipe	1	(0)
- * Club domestic league appearances and goals ‡ National team caps and goals as of 4 September 2019

Jakson Da Trindade (born 13 June 1994), commonly known as Capito, is a São Toméan footballer who plays as a forward for Sporting Praia Cruz and the São Tomé and Príncipe national team.

== International career ==
Capito made his international debut for São Tomé and Príncipe on 4 September 2019.
