= Susan Wagner =

American financial executive (born 1961)

- Born: Susan Lynne Wagner; May 26, 1961 (age 65); Chicago, Illinois, US
- Education: Wellesley College (BA); University of Chicago (MBA)
- Known for: Co-founding BlackRock
- Board member of: BlackRock; Color Health; Samsara; Apple Inc.

Susan Lynne Wagner (born 1961) is an American financial executive. Wagner is one of the co-founders of BlackRock, an American multinational investment management corporation, where she was vice chairman and chief operating officer. BlackRock is the largest asset management firm in the world with over $12 trillion in assets under management as of 2025.

In 2011, she was named to two lists of powerful women: "Most Powerful Women in New York 2011" and "50 Most Powerful Women in Business (2011)".

== Early life and education ==
Wagner was born in 1961 in Chicago to a Jewish family. She graduated in 1982 with honors from Wellesley College with a BA in English and Economics, and then earned an MBA in finance from the University of Chicago in 1984.

== Career ==
After earning her MBA, Wagner worked as vice president of the mortgage finance group for Lehman Brothers. In 1988, Wagner and Ralph Schlosstein left Lehman to join Blackstone Financial Group. Later, Blackstone Financial Group changed their name to BlackRock.

As one of the co-founders of BlackRock in 1988, Wagner was vice chairman and chief operating officer. She orchestrated BlackRock's mergers and acquisitions, which included Quellos, Merrill Lynch Investment Management, and Barclays Global Investors. Prior to retiring from BlackRock in 2012, Wagner expanded the company into Asia, the Middle East and Brazil. Since retiring from BlackRock, she is on their board of directors, and a member of the board of trustees of the Hackley School.

In May 2014, Wagner was asked by Wellesley's class of 2014 to deliver the commencement address.

In July 2014, Wagner was named to the board of Apple Inc., replacing long-time board member William Campbell. Wagner was the second woman on the Apple eight-member board and the only director with a background in finance. In 2014, she also was elected to the board of directors of Swiss Re.
