= Hope & Heroes Children's Cancer Fund =

Non-profit organisation in the US

Hope & Heroes is a 501(c)(3) nonprofit organization supporting children with cancer and blood disorders in the New York, New Jersey, and Connecticut Tri-State area. The organization provides funding for research and clinical care at pediatric cancer centers across the region.

== History ==
Hope & Heroes was founded in 1996. the Hope & Heroes name dates back to 1996, when sportswriter Mike Lupica wrote about the friendship between patient Beth Maria and Tino Martinez who was then a first baseman for the New York Yankees. The first article appeared on the front page of the New York Daily News on June 22, 1997, with the headline "Hope & Heroes". Michael Weiner, MD, then Chief of the Division of Pediatric Oncology at Columbia University Medical Center and founder of the charity, adopted the name as part of his efforts to attract funding for pediatric cancer and blood disorder programs that needed philanthropic support.
