= Larry Fink =

American businessman (born 1952)

Larry Fink BBM
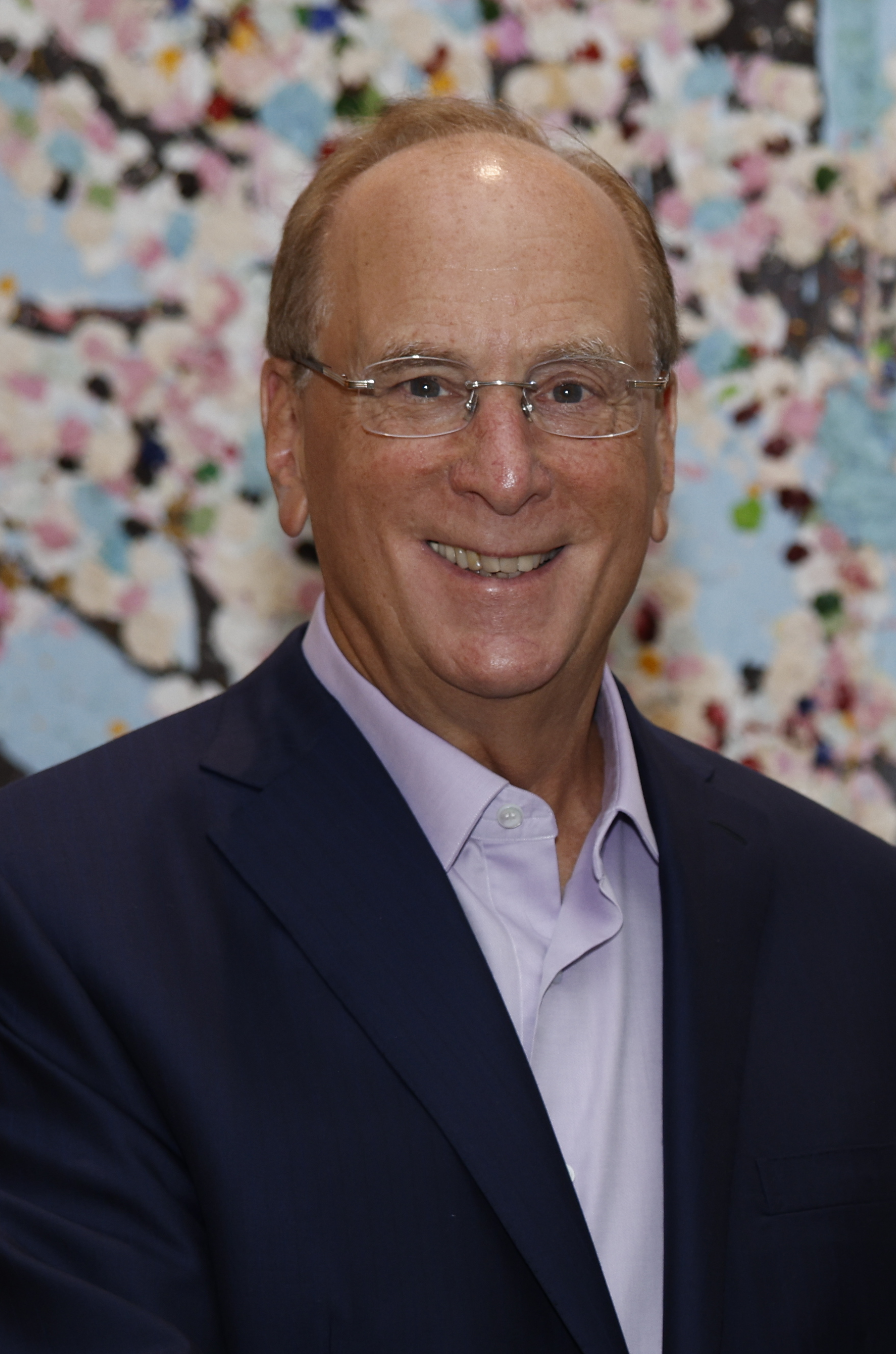
- Fink in 2025

Chairman of the World Economic Forum
- Incumbent
- Assumed office 15 August 2025
- Preceded by: Peter Brabeck-Letmathe (acting)

Personal details
- Born: Laurence Douglas Fink; November 2, 1952 (age 74) Los Angeles, California, U.S.
- Party: Democratic
- Spouse: Lori Weider (m. 1974)
- Children: 3
- Education: University of California, Los Angeles (BA, MBA)

Laurence Douglas Fink (born November 2, 1952) is an American billionaire businessman. He is a co-founder, chairman, and CEO of BlackRock, an American multinational investment management corporation. BlackRock is the largest money-management firm in the world with more than US$10 trillion in assets under management. In April 2024, Fink's net worth was estimated at US$1.2 billion according to Forbes. He is a co-chairman of the World Economic Forum. In 2025, Time magazine listed him as one of the world's 100 most influential people.

== Early life ==
Fink was born on November 2, 1952. He grew up as one of three children in a Jewish family in Van Nuys, California. His mother, Lila (1930–2012), was an English professor, and his father, Frederick (1925–2013), owned a shoe store. He graduated from the University of California, Los Angeles with a B.A. in political science in 1974. He then received an M.B.A. in real estate at the UCLA Anderson School of Management in 1976.

== Career ==
=== 1970s to 2000 ===
Fink started his career in 1976 at First Boston, a New York-based investment bank, where he was one of the first mortgage-backed security traders and eventually managed the firm's bond department. At First Boston, Fink was a member of the management committee, a managing director and co-head of the Taxable Fixed Income Division. He also started the Financial Futures and Options Department and headed the Mortgage and Real Estate Products Group.

Vanity Fair reported in 2010 that Fink had increased First Boston's assets by about $1 billion. He was successful at the bank until 1986, when his department lost $100 million due to his incorrect prediction about interest rates. The experience influenced his decision to start a company that would invest clients' money while also incorporating comprehensive risk management.

In 1988, under the corporate umbrella of The Blackstone Group, Fink co-founded BlackRock and became its director and CEO. When BlackRock split from Blackstone in 1994, Fink retained his positions, becoming chairman in 1998 after BlackRock became independent. His other positions at the company have included chairman of the board, chairman of the executive and leadership committees, chair of corporate council and co-chair of the global client committee. BlackRock went public in 1999.

=== 21st century ===
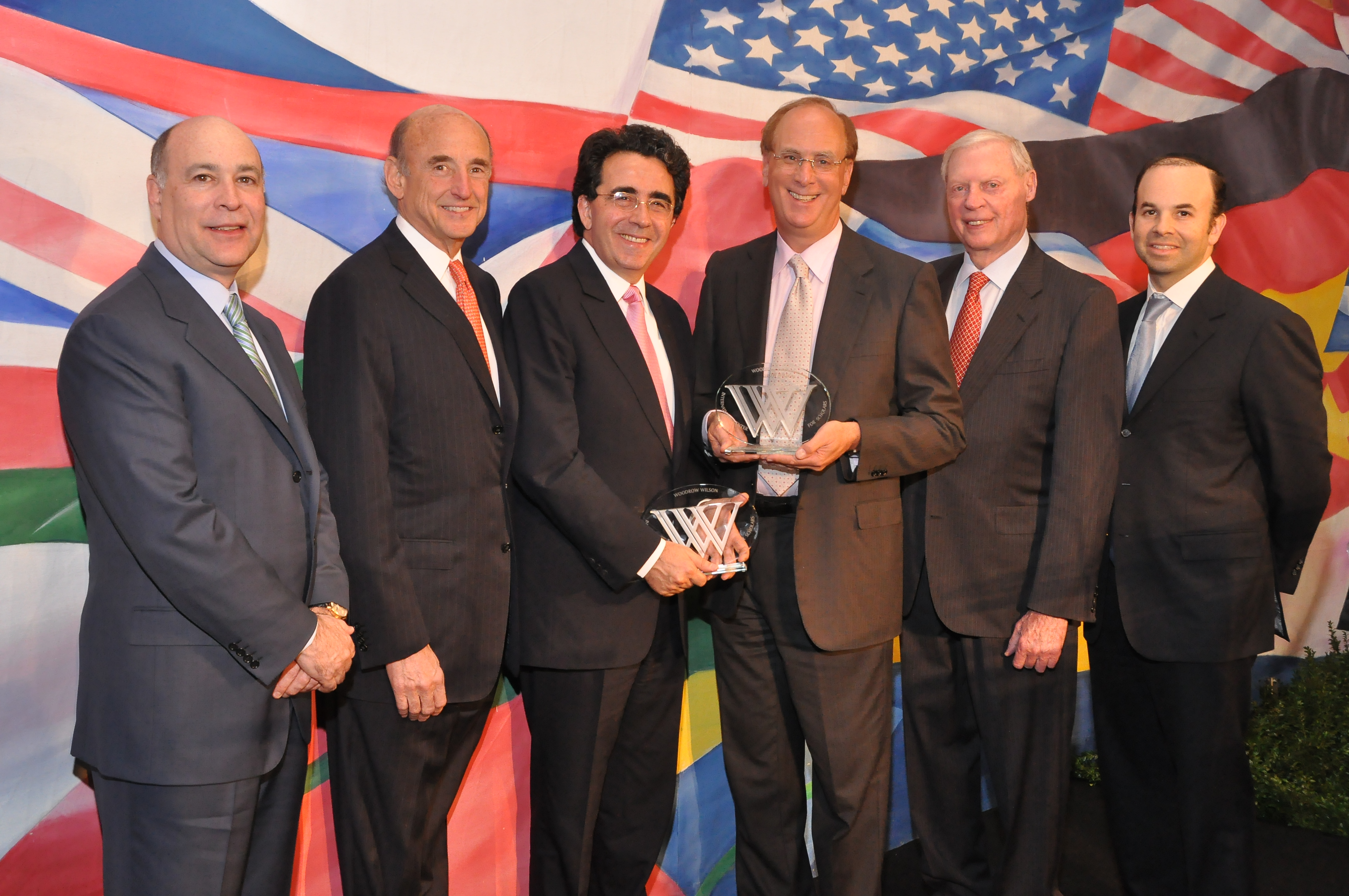
Fink, third from right, receiving a Woodrow Wilson Award in April 2010

In 2003, Fink helped to negotiate the resignation of the CEO of the New York Stock Exchange, Richard Grasso, who was widely criticized for his $190 million pay package. In 2006 Fink led the merger with Merrill Lynch Investment Managers, which doubled BlackRock's asset management portfolio. That same year, BlackRock's $5.4 billion purchase of Stuyvesant Town–Peter Cooper Village, a Manhattan housing complex, became the largest residential-real-estate deal in U.S. history. When the project ended in default, BlackRock clients lost their money, including the California Pension and Retirement System, which lost about $500 million.

The U.S. government contracted BlackRock to aid its recovery after the 2008 financial crisis. Fink's longstanding relationships with senior government officials have led to questions about potential conflicts of interest regarding government contracts awarded without competitive bidding. BlackRock's contract led to relationships with Obama's first Treasury Secretary Tim Geithner and other members of the Obama economic recovery team. In 2016, Fink aspired to becoming Hillary Clinton's Treasury Secretary. Blackrock also hired many former executive branch appointees to its firm, strengthening its association with the federal government.

In December 2009, BlackRock purchased Barclays Global Investors, at which point the company became the largest money-management firm in the world. Despite his great influence, Fink is not widely known publicly, apart from his regular appearances on CNBC. BlackRock paid Fink $23.6 million in 2010, and $36 million in 2021. By 2016, BlackRock had $5 trillion under management, with 12,000 employees in 27 countries.

In 2016, Fink received the ABANA Achievement Award in New York City. It recognizes an individual who exemplifies outstanding leadership in banking and finance and has a commitment to positive professional cooperation between the US and the Middle East and North Africa.

In 2018, Fink was ranked No. 28 on the Forbes list of The World's Most Powerful People.

During the coronavirus pandemic of 2020, the Fed turned to BlackRock to help it purchase distressed securities in an echo of 2008.

In the lead-up to the 2024 presidential election, Fink said that it "really doesn’t matter" for financial markets whether Donald Trump or Kamala Harris wins the election.

In March 2025, following weeks of poor performance by US stocks amid actions by the Donald Trump administration, Fink said, "protectionism has returned with force."

== Community involvement ==
Fink is on the board of trustees of New York University, where he holds various chairmanships including chair of the Financial Affairs Committee. He co-chairs the NYU Langone Medical Center board of trustees, and is a trustee of the Boys and Girls Club of New York. Fink is on the board of the Robin Hood Foundation. Fink founded the Lori and Laurence Fink Center for Finance & Investments at UCLA Anderson in 2009, and is its chairman.

In December 2016, Fink joined a business forum assembled by then president-elect Donald Trump to provide strategic and policy advice on economic issues.

In his 2018 annual open letter to CEOs, he called for corporations to play an active role in improving the environment, working to better their communities, and increasing the diversity of their work forces. This has been taken as evidence of a move by BlackRock, one of the largest public investors, to proactively enforce these targets. In his 2019 open letter, Fink said that companies and their CEOs must step into a leadership vacuum to tackle social and political issues when governments fail to address these issues.

After the murder of Jamal Khashoggi in October 2018, Fink cancelled plans to attend an investment conference in Saudi Arabia.

In his 2020 annual open letter, Fink announced environmental sustainability as core goal for BlackRock's future investment decisions. In this letter, he explained how climate will become a driver in economics, affecting all aspects of the economy. He also divulged in a separate letter (to investors) that BlackRock will be cutting ties with previous investments involving thermal coal and other investments that have a large environmental risk.

In December 2021, BlackRock teamed up with a Saudi asset manager to pay $15.5 billion to buy and then lease back gas pipelines to Saudi Aramco. In 2022, Fink was named one of the top US "climate villains" by The Guardian due to BlackRock's profiting from deforestation. Fink, in an open letter in 2022, stated "Every company and every industry will be transformed by the transition to a net-zero world. The question is, will you lead, or will you be led?"

Fink also supports the New York City Police Foundation, which is a group that provides financial support to the New York City Police Department. The non-profit Color of Change called on Fink to divest from the NYC Police Foundation in the wake of the murder of George Floyd and subsequent nationwide protests.

== Personal life ==
Fink has been married to his wife Lori Weider, his high-school sweetheart since 1974. The couple have three children. Joshua, their eldest son, was CEO of Enso Capital, a now defunct hedge fund in which Fink had a stake.

In 2004, they bought Finch Farm in North Salem, New York from the actor Stanley Tucci for $3.7 million and have since bought seven more parcels of land there, including one from Maurice Sendak and 27 acres from the town's deputy supervisor Peter Kamenstein in 2019 for $5.4 million. They also have an apartment on the Upper East Side of Manhattan and a house in Aspen, Colorado.

Fink is a lifelong supporter of the Democratic Party.

=== Views ===
In his 2018 annual letter to shareholders, Fink stated that other companies should be aware of their impact on society; however, antiwar organizations were discontented with Fink's statement because his company, BlackRock, is the largest investor in weapon manufacturers through its U.S. Aerospace and Defense ETF. In September 2018, an activist with the U.S. non-profit organization Code Pink confronted Fink onstage at the Yahoo Finance All Markets Summit.

== Honors ==
- 2007, Golden Plate Award of the American Academy of Achievement
- 2015, Appeal of Conscience Award
- 2015, Americas Society Gold Medal
- 2016, UCLA Medal
- 2019, Charles Schwab Financial Innovation Award
- 2026, Public Service Star
