= Gaius Fonteius Capito =

Gaius Fonteius Capito may refer to:

- Gaius Fonteius Capito (suffect consul 33 BC), suffect consul of 33 BC, father of the consul of AD 12, and grandfather of the consul of AD 59.
- Gaius Fonteius Capito (consul AD 12), consul of AD 12, son of the suffect consul of 33 BC, and father of the consul of AD 59.
- Gaius Fonteius Capito (consul 59), consul of AD 59 and son of the consul of AD 12.
