= BlackRock =

American investment company

BlackRock, Inc.

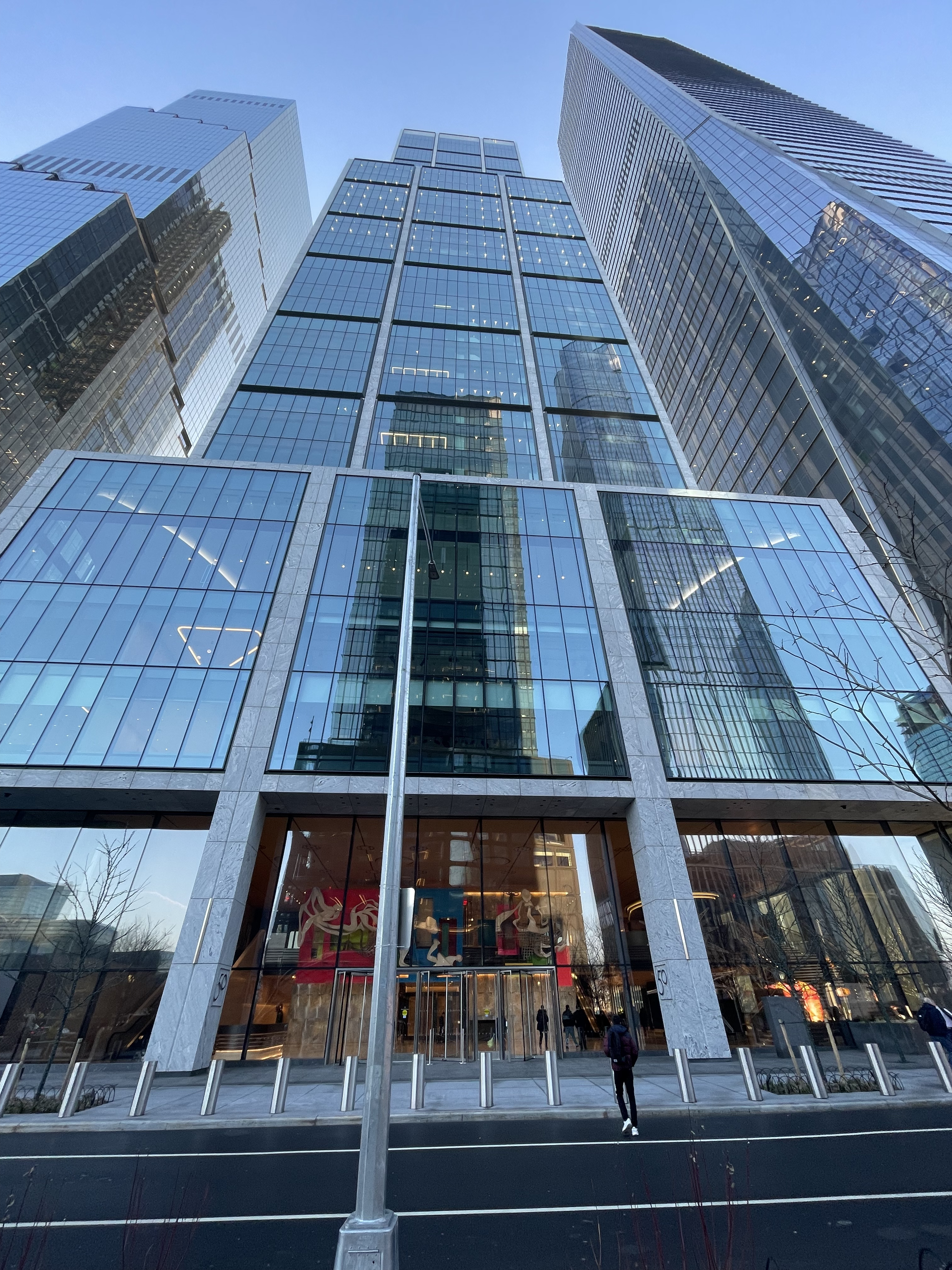
- Headquarters at 50 Hudson Yards
- Type: Public
- Traded as: NYSE: BLK; S&P 100 component; S&P 500 component
- ISIN: US450614482
- Industry: Investment management
- Founded: March 9, 1988; 38 years ago
- Founders: Robert S. Kapito; Larry Fink; Susan Wagner
- Headquarters: 50 Hudson Yards, New York City, U.S.
- Area served: Worldwide
- Key people: Larry Fink; (chairman and CEO); Robert S. Kapito; (president); Philipp Hildebrand; (vice chairman)
- Products: Alternative investment; Asset management; ESG investment; Wealth management; Aladdin
- Revenue: ▲US$24.22 billion (2025)
- Operating income: ▼US$7.045 billion (2025)
- Net income: ▼US$5.553 billion (2025)
- AUM: ▲US$15.3 trillion (2026)
- Total assets: ▲US$170.0 billion (2025)
- Total equity: ▲US$55.89 billion (2025)
- Number of employees: 24,900 (2025)
- Subsidiaries: iShares; Global Infrastructure Partners; HPS Investment Partners
- Website: blackrock.com

BlackRock, Inc. is an American multinational investment company. Founded in 1988, initially as an enterprise risk management and fixed income institutional asset manager, BlackRock is the largest asset manager worldwide, with $15.3 trillion in assets under management as of 2026. Headquartered in New York City, BlackRock has 70 offices in 30 countries and clients in 100 countries.

BlackRock is the manager of the iShares group of exchange-traded funds, and along with Fidelity, Vanguard, and State Street, it is considered one of the "Big Three" index fund managers. Its Aladdin platform provides portfolio management, risk analytics, trading, accounting, and operational technology for institutional investors and financial organizations. Its BlackRock Solutions division provides financial risk management services. BlackRock is ranked 210th on the Fortune 500.

BlackRock has sought to position itself as an industry leader in environmental, social, and governance (ESG) considerations in investments. As of 2026, nine U.S. states have divested a total of $13.3 billion from BlackRock because of its ESG policies. BlackRock has been criticized for investing in companies involved in fossil fuels, the arms industry, the People's Liberation Army, and human rights violations in China.

== History ==
=== 1988–1999 ===
BlackRock was founded in 1988 by Larry Fink, Robert S. Kapito, Susan Wagner, Barbara Novick, Bennett Golub, Hugh Frater, Ralph Schlosstein, and Keith Anderson to provide institutional clients with asset management services from a risk-management perspective. Fink, Kapito, Golub, and Novick had worked together at First Boston, where Fink and his team were pioneers in the mortgage-backed securities market in the United States. During Fink's tenure, he had lost $90 million as co-head of First Boston's Fixed Income Division. That experience was the motivation to develop what he and the others considered excellent risk management and fiduciary practices. Initially, Fink sought funding (for initial operating capital) from Peter Peterson of The Blackstone Group, who believed in Fink's vision of a firm devoted to risk management. Peterson called it Blackstone Financial Management. In exchange for a 50% stake in the bond business, Blackstone initially gave Fink and his team a $5 million credit line. Within months, the business had turned profitable, and by 1989 the group's assets had quadrupled to $2.7 billion. The proportion of the stake Blackstone owned also fell to 40%, compared to Fink's staff.

By 1992, Blackstone had a stake of about 36% in the company, and Stephen A. Schwarzman and Fink were considering selling shares to the public. The firm adopted the name BlackRock, and was managing $17 billion in assets by the end of the year. At the end of 1994, BlackRock was managing $53 billion. In 1994, Schwarzman and Fink had an internal dispute over methods of compensation and equity. Fink wanted to share equity with new hires, to lure talent from banks, but Schwarzman did not want to further lower Blackstone's stake. They agreed to part ways, and Schwarzman sold BlackRock, a decision he later called a "heroic mistake".

In June 1994, Blackstone sold a mortgage-securities unit with $23 billion in assets to PNC Financial Services for $240 million. The unit had traded mortgages and other fixed-income assets, and during the sales process it changed its name from Blackstone Financial Management to BlackRock Financial Management. Schwarzman remained with Blackstone, while Fink became chairman and CEO of BlackRock.

=== 1999–2009 ===
On October 1, 1999, BlackRock became a public company, selling shares at $14 each via an initial public offering on the New York Stock Exchange. By the end of 1999, BlackRock was managing $165 billion in assets. BlackRock grew both organically and by acquisition. In 2000, the firm launched BlackRock Solutions to provide risk management and investment analytics to institutional investors and other large investment managers. The platform includes advisory services and technology, being based on BlackRock's Aladdin System, an acronym for Asset Liability and Debt and Derivative Investment Network.

In August 2004, BlackRock made its first major acquisition, buying State Street Research & Management's holding company SSRM Holdings, Inc. from MetLife for $325 million in cash and $50 million in stock. The acquisition increased BlackRock's assets under management from $314 billion to $325 billion. The deal included the mutual-fund business State Street Research & Management in 2005.

BlackRock merged with Merrill's Investment Managers division (MLIM) in 2006, halving PNC's ownership and giving Merrill a 49.5% stake in the company. In October 2007, BlackRock acquired the fund-of-funds business of Quellos Capital Management. In April 2009, BlackRock acquired R3 Capital Management, LLC and management of its $1.5 billion fund. In May 2009, BlackRock Solutions was retained by the U.S. Treasury Department to analyze, unwind, and price the toxic assets that were owned by Bear Stearns, American International Group, Freddie Mac, Morgan Stanley, and other financial firms that were affected in the 2008 financial crisis. The Federal Reserve allowed BlackRock to superintend the $130 billion-debt settlement of Bear Stearns and American International Group.

=== 2010–2019 ===
In February 2010, to raise capital needed due to the 2008 financial crisis, Barclays sold its Barclays Global Investors (BGI) unit, which included its exchange traded fund business, iShares, to BlackRock for US$13.5 billion and Barclays acquired a near-20% stake in BlackRock. On April 1, 2011, BlackRock was added as a component of the S&P 500 stock market index. In 2013, Fortune listed BlackRock on its annual list of the world's 50 Most Admired Companies. In 2014, BlackRock's $4 trillion under management made it the "world's biggest asset manager". At the end of 2014, the Sovereign Wealth Fund Institute reported that 65% of Blackrock's assets under management were made up of institutional investors.

By June 30, 2015, BlackRock had US$4.721 trillion of assets under management. On August 26, 2015, BlackRock entered into a definitive agreement to acquire FutureAdvisor, a digital wealth management provider with reported assets under management of $600 million. Under the deal, FutureAdvisor would operate as a business within BlackRock Solutions (BRS). BlackRock announced in November 2015 that they would wind down the BlackRock Global Ascent hedge fund after losses. The Global Ascent fund had been its only dedicated global macro fund, as BlackRock was "better known for its mutual funds and exchange traded funds". At the time, BlackRock managed $51 billion in hedge funds, with $20 billion of that in funds of hedge funds.

In March 2017, BlackRock, after a six-month review led by Mark Wiseman, initiated a restructuring of its $8 billion actively managed fund business, resulting in the departure of seven portfolio managers and a $25 million charge in the second quarter, replacing certain funds with quantitative investment strategies. By April 2017, iShares business accounted for $1.41 trillion, or 26%, of BlackRock's total assets under management, and 37% of BlackRock's base fee income. Also in April 2017, BlackRock backed the inclusion of mainland Chinese shares in MSCI's global index for the first time.

=== 2020–present ===
In January 2020, PNC Financial Services sold its stake in BlackRock for $14.4 billion. In March 2020, the Federal Reserve chose BlackRock to manage two corporate bond-buying programs in response to the COVID-19 pandemic. This also included the $500 billion Primary Market Corporate Credit Facility (PMCCF) and the Secondary Market Corporate Credit Facility (SMCCF), as well as purchase by the Federal Reserve of commercial mortgage-backed securities (CMBS) guaranteed by Government National Mortgage Association, Fannie Mae, or Freddie Mac. In August 2020, BlackRock received approval from the China Securities Regulatory Commission to set up a mutual fund business in the country. This made BlackRock the first global asset manager to get consent from the Chinese government to start operations in the country.

In October 2021 BlackRock launched its Voting Choice program, enabling institutional clients invested in index funds to participate in shareholder voting. Eligible clients can vote all issues, vote only on some issues, select from 14 different voting policies, or allow BlackRock's investment stewardship team to vote for them. BlackRock Investment Stewardship is a team of approximately 70 analysts who engage with the boards and management teams of companies, and vote shares, on the behalf of non-voting clients.

In May 2021, BlackRock announced that it has acted as the majority debt provider on Heylo housing's £362.5 million acquisition of a portfolio of 3,000 shared-ownership homes through its Home Reach scheme.

In November 2021, BlackRock lowered its investment in India while increasing investment in China. The firm maintains a dedicated India Fund, through which it invests in Indian start-ups Byju's, Paytm, and Pine Labs. On December 28, 2022, it was announced that BlackRock and Volodymyr Zelenskyy had coordinated a role for the company in the reconstruction of Ukraine. This was after BlackRock CEO Larry Fink and Zelenskyy met over a video conference in September, 2022. In July 2025, Bloomberg reported that BlackRock had paused efforts earlier in the year to line up investors for a proposed Ukraine recovery fund amid increased uncertainty. The company said it had completed its pro bono advisory work in 2024 and no longer had an active mandate. In April 2023, the company was hired to sell $114 billion in assets of Signature Bank and Silicon Valley Bank after the 2023 United States banking crisis. In June 2023, BlackRock filed an application with the United States Securities and Exchange Commission (SEC) to launch a Spot Bitcoin Exchange-Traded Fund (ETF), and in November 2023 it filed another application for a Spot Ethereum ETF. The spot bitcoin ETF filing and 10 others were approved on January 10, 2024. On January 19, 2024, the iShares Bitcoin Trust ETF (IBIT) was the first spot bitcoin ETF to reach $1 billion in volume.

In July 2023, the company appointed Amin H. Nasser to its board. Nasser, the chief executive officer of Saudi Aramco, the world's largest oil company, will fill BlackRock's board vacancy left by Bader Alsaad in 2024. In August 2023, BlackRock signed an agreement with New Zealand to establish a NZ$2 billion investment fund for solar, wind, green hydrogen, battery storage, and EV charging projects as part of its goal of reaching 100% renewable energy by 2030. In January 2024, BlackRock announced that it would acquire the investment fund Global Infrastructure Partners for $12.5 billion. BlackRock agreed to pay $3 billion in cash and 12 million of its own shares as part of the deal to buy GIP. In March 2024, BlackRock launched its first tokenized fund, the BlackRock USD Institutional Digital Liquidity Fund (BUIDL) on Ethereum, which represents investments in U.S. Treasury bills and repo agreements. The fund secured $245 million in assets in the first week. On July 15, 2024, BlackRock removed from circulation an advertisement filmed in 2022 that briefly featured Thomas Matthew Crooks, the gunman in the attempted assassination of Donald Trump. The firm expanded its headquarters at 50 Hudson Yards in mid-2024.

In December 2024, BlackRock agreed to acquire HPS Investment Partners, a private credit manager with approximately $148 billion in client assets, for about $12 billion paid in BlackRock equity. The transaction closed on July 1, 2025. BlackRock combined HPS with its own private credit and collateralized loan obligation businesses in a new unit called Private Financing Solutions, which the firm said held approximately $190 billion in client assets at closing.

In March 2025, BlackRock launched its first European bitcoin exchange-traded product, the iShares Bitcoin ETP, domiciled in Switzerland and listed in Paris, Amsterdam, and Frankfurt. In the United States, BlackRock's iShares Bitcoin Trust (IBIT) launched in January 2024, and by May 2024, was reported as the world's largest bitcoin fund, with nearly $20 billion in assets. In November 2024, its tokenized money market fund BUIDL expanded from Ethereum to Aptos, Arbitrum, Avalanche, Optimism and Polygon. In April 2025, BlackRock filed to the SEC to launch a new share class of its $150 billion money market fund that is registered on a blockchain. In June 2025, BlackRock launched the iShares Texas Equity ETF (TEXN), a Texas focused fund the firm said would invest in companies headquartered in the state. On 24 February 2026, BlackRock acquired a 5.01% stake in HLB, a South Korean biotech firm. In March 2026, BlackRock announced that it was limiting withdrawals from a private credit fund.

In July 2023, BlackRock and Jio Financial Services formed a 50:50 asset management joint venture, Jio BlackRock, which received registration from the Securities and Exchange Board of India in May 2025 and began operations that year. In January 2026 the venture's chief executive said it had reached one million investors and held more than ₹13,700 crore in assets under management.

In March 2026, the BlackRock Foundation announced Future Builders, a $100 million, five-year program funding skilled-trades training through nonprofit and workforce-development partners, with a stated goal of reaching 50,000 workers. Reporting on the announcement connected it to BlackRock's infrastructure investments and to chief executive Larry Fink's statements about shortages of electricians and other tradespeople needed for data-center construction.

In the third quarter of 2026, BlackRock bought in $15.31 billion in private market investments and raised $68 billion over the past year. By September 2026, assets under management had a record $15.49 trillion, up from $13.46 trillion the year before.

== Finances ==
Year	Revenue (million USD)	Net income (million USD)	Total assets (million USD)	AUM (million USD)	Price per share (USD)	Employees
2005	1,191	234	1,848		62.85	2,151
2006	2,098	323	20,469		103.75	5,113
2007	4,845	993	22,561		128.69	5,952
2008	5,064	784	19,924	1,310,000	144.07	5,341
2009	4,700	875	178,124	3,350,000	136.79	8,629
2010	8,612	2,063	178,459	3,561,000	145.85	9,127
2011	9,081	2,337	179,896	3,513,000	148.27	10,100
2012	9,337	2,458	200,451	3,792,000	158.53	10,500
2013	10,180	2,932	219,873	4,325,000	238.52	11,400
2014	11,081	3,294	239,792	4,651,895	289.80	12,200
2015	11,401	3,345	225,261	4,645,412	322.68	13,000
2016	12,261	3,168	220,177	5,147,852	334.16	13,000
2017	13,600	4,952	220,217	6,288,195	414.60	13,900
2018	14,198	4,305	159,573	5,975,818	492.98	14,900
2019	14,539	4,476	168,622	7,430,000	448.22	16,200
2020	16,205	4,932	176,982	8,677,000	558.56	16,500
2021	19,169	5,901	152,648	10,010,143	913.76	18,400
2022	17,873	5,178	117,628	8,594,485	708.63	19,800
2023	17,859	5,502	123,211	10,008,995	811.80	19,800
2024	20,407	6,369	138,615	11,551,251	1,025.11	21,100
2025	24,922	5,553	169,998	14,000,000		24,900

== Mergers and acquisitions ==
Number	Acquisition date	Company	Country	Price (USD)	Used as or integrated with	Refs.
1	February 10, 2006	Merrill's Investment Managers division (MLIM)	United States	$9.3 billion	Retail and international presence	
2	January 12, 2009	Barclays Global Investor	United States	$13.5 billion	ETF	
3	January 15, 2010	Helix Financial Group	United States	–	CRE	
4	August 25, 2015	FutureAdvisor	United States	$150 million	Robo-advisory	
5	April 18, 2016	Money market fund business of Bank of America	United States	–	$80 billion in assets in money market funds	
6	February 1, 2017	Energy infrastructure investment platform of First Reserve Corporation	United States	–	Funds investing in energy	
7	June 9, 2017	Cachematrix	United States	–	Liquidity management	
8	January 8, 2018	Tennenbaum Capital Partners	United States	–	Private credit	
9	September 24, 2018	Asset Management Business of Citibanamex	Mexico	$350 million	Fixed income, equity, and multi-asset funds holding	
10	October 5, 2019	eFront	France	$1.3 billion in cash	Alternative investment management software	
11	February 1, 2021	Aperio	United States	$1.05 billion in cash	A provider of tax-optimized index equity separately managed accounts	
12	June 8, 2023	Kreos	United Kingdom	–	Private credit	
13	January 12, 2024	Global Infrastructure Partners	United States	$12.5 billion ($3 billion in cash, rest in shares)	Infrastructure assets	
14	July 1, 2024	Preqin	United Kingdom	$3.2 billion	Private market data provider	
15	December 3, 2024	HPS Investment Partners	United States	$12 billion ($9.3 billion in stock, $3 billion in five years subject to targets)	Private credit	
16	September 2, 2025	ElmTree Funds	United States	–	Private Financing Solutions; commercial net-lease sector; long-dated contractual income solutions.	

In March 2025, BlackRock completed its acquisition of Preqin, a provider of private markets data, research, benchmarks and analytics. The acquisition expanded BlackRock's capabilities in private markets data and supported the integration of private markets information within its Aladdin technology platform.

In 2025, BlackRock was one of the donors who funded the White House's East Wing demolition and planned building of a ballroom.

== Controversies ==
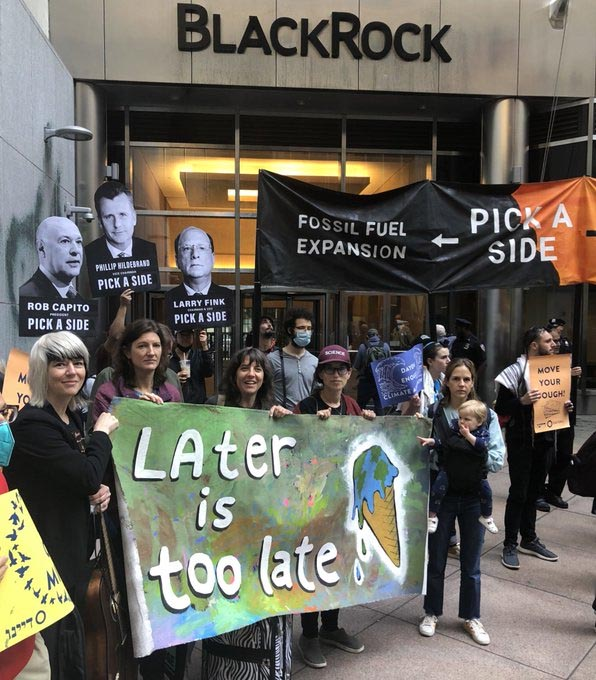
Environmental activists, including global interfaith organization GreenFaith and Extinction Rebellion, protest BlackRock's shareholder meeting on May 31, 2022, due to its investment of client assets in companies that contribute to climate change.

=== Allegations of under-regulation ===
Blackrock is a non-bank financial institution and, as a result, it does not face the same regulations as banks. This has led to calls by U.S. government officials, including Elizabeth Warren, Katie Porter, and Chuy García, to increase regulation of the firm, including designating it as "too big to fail".

=== Influence of the largest asset managers ===
The 'Big Three' asset management firms – BlackRock, Vanguard and State Street manage over $15 trillion in combined global assets under management.

BlackRock invests the funds of its clients (for example, the owners of iShares exchange-traded fund units) in numerous publicly traded companies. Because of the size of BlackRock's funds, the company and other large asset managers are technically listed among the largest shareholders of many public companies. BlackRock states these shares are ultimately owned by the company's clients, not by BlackRock itself—a view shared by multiple independent academics—but acknowledges it can exercise shareholder votes on behalf of these clients, in many cases without client input.

BlackRock allows institutional investors in ETFs to participate in shareholder voting. Investors in BlackRock's iShares Core S&P 500 ETF can choose from seven different general policies designed by Glass Lewis and Institutional Shareholder Services but they cannot make specific votes on any of the 500 components of the ETF.

The company has faced criticism due to "common ownership". It has invested client funds in several companies that compete with each other, which allegedly stifles competition.

=== Criticism of holdings in investment funds ===
Since BlackRock invests clients assets in a wide array of companies, some of which are controversial, the company has been subject to boycotts, protests, and criticism.

Investment products and initiatives that have attracted criticism include those with connections to environmental, social and corporate governance (ESG) and socially responsible investing initiatives, coal-fired power stations and other contributors to climate change, investments in gun manufacturers and gun retailers as well as establishment of gun-free investment products, investments in China including companies aiding the People's Liberation Army and companies involved in the persecution of Uyghurs in China, and companies that do business in Israel.

The company has also been criticized for supporting actions such as the Carbon Disclosure Project and gender diversity.

Institutions that have called for or implemented protests, boycotts, or divestments from BlackRock include the Sierra Club, Amazon Watch, and other environmental groups, and the states of West Virginia, Louisiana, and Florida, which were opposed to ESG initiatives.

=== Ties with Israel ===
During 2025, a UN report on corporations involved in the Gaza war included BlackRock as one of the main investors in tech and military companies, such as Palantir, Microsoft, Amazon, Alphabet Inc., IBM, Lockheed Martin and Caterpillar Inc.

== Key people ==
BlackRock has a 19-member board of directors, including:

- Larry Fink, founder, chairman and CEO
- Pamela Daley
- Greg Fleming
- William E. Ford
- Fabrizio Freda
- Murry S. Gerber
- Peggy Johnson
- Robert S. Kapito – founder and co-president
- Gregg Lemkau
- Cheryl Mills
- Kathleen Murphy
- Amin H. Nasser
- Gordon Nixon
- Adebayo Ogunlesi
- Kristin Peck
- Chuck Robbins
- Hans Vestberg
- Susan Wagner – founder and member of the board
- Mark Wilson

Notable former members of the board of directors include:

- Brian Deese – former Global Head of Sustainable Investing
- Blake Grossman – former vice chairman

== See also ==
- Companies listed on the New York Stock Exchange (B)
- Globalism
- Investment trust
- List of CDO managers
- List of S&P 500 companies
- List of asset management firms
- List of companies based in New York City
- List of hedge funds
- Sovereign Wealth Fund Institute
