= Herbert Muschamp =

American architecture critic (1947–2007)

- Born: Herbert Mitchell Muschamp; November 28, 1947; Philadelphia
- Died: October 2, 2007 (aged 59); New York City
- Education: University of Pennsylvania, Parsons School of Design
- Occupation: architecture critic
- Notable credit(s): The New York Times, The New Republic, Vogue, House & Garden and Art Forum

Herbert Mitchell Muschamp (November 28, 1947 – October 2, 2007) was an American architecture critic.

== Early years ==
Born in Philadelphia, Muschamp described his childhood home life as follows: "The living room was a secret. A forbidden zone. The new slipcovers were not, in fact, the reason why sitting down there was taboo. That was just the cover story. It was used to conceal the inability of family members to hold a conversation. Who knew what other secrets might come tumbling out if they actually sat down and talked? The cause of Mother's headaches might come up."

This motivated Muschamp to engage in boisterous conversations outside the home in later years, particularly in the company of such up-and-coming architects as Elizabeth Diller and Ricardo Scofidio, Frank Gehry, Rem Koolhaas, Jean Nouvel, Bernard Tschumi and Tod Williams, which formed the basis for his perceptive and often vehement architectural commentary and criticism.

Muschamp attended the University of Pennsylvania but dropped out after two years to move to New York City, where he was a regular at Andy Warhol's Factory. He later attended Parsons School of Design, where he studied architecture, and returned to teach after spending some time studying at the Architectural Association in London.

== Career ==
During this period, he began writing architectural criticism for various magazines, including Vogue, House & Garden, and Art Forum. He was appointed the architecture critic for The New Republic in 1987.

Muschamp became the architecture critic for The New York Times in 1992, succeeding Paul Goldberger. During his controversial tenure at the Times, Muschamp rose, according to Nicolai Ouroussoff, to preeminence as the nation's foremost judge of the architecture world. His writing championed now-famous architects such as Frank Gehry, Rem Koolhaas, Zaha Hadid and Jean Nouvel, as well as architects that he regarded as rising talents, including Greg Lynn, Lindy Roy, Jesse Reiser, Nanako Umemoto and Casagrande & Rintala.

His detractors, noted the New York Observer, argued that his conflicts of interest, from socializing with his subjects frequently, and his "iconoclasm and obscurantism, his unapologetic dilettantism" were along with his "very public break downs" a source of a "fall from grace."

Muschamp was a lover of cities. One of his most often quoted lines came from a 2004 review: "A city is never more fully human than when expertise – our own or someone else's – allows us access to ebullience, lightness and delight." He spent a number of columns criticizing the new master plan for the World Trade Center site, calling the plan produced by Daniel Libeskind an embodiment of the "Orwellian condition America's detractors accuse us of embracing: perpetual war for perpetual peace."

He stepped down as the architecture critic of The New York Times in 2004 to write the "Icons" column for the Times' T Style Magazine, among other features. He was replaced by his protégé, Nicolai Ouroussoff. Muschamp was openly gay, and the centrality of gay men in the cultural life of New York City was central to his writing. He continued to write until his death from lung cancer in Manhattan in 2007.

A book collection of Muschamp's writings, Hearts of the City: The Selected Writings of Herbert Muschamp, was published by Alfred A. Knopf in 2010.
