= Jean-Luc Sandoz =

French and Swiss engineer and wood expert

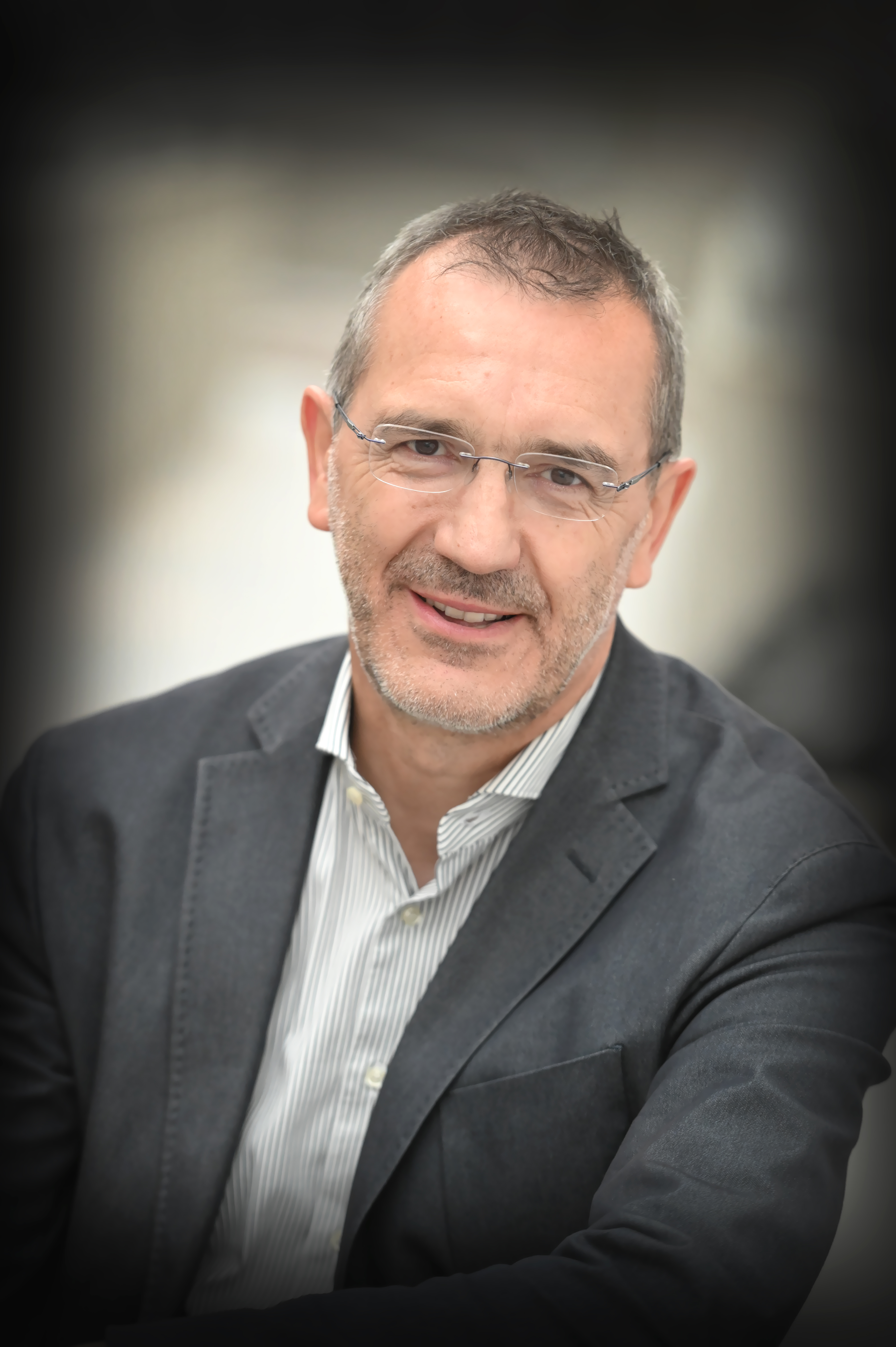
- Jean-Luc Sandoz in 2019
- Born: 1960 (age 65–66); Montandon
- Occupations: Scientist, inventor, entrepreneur, wood expert
- Awards: Académie d'architecture 2016

Academic background
- Education: ENSTIB (École nationale supérieure des technologies et industries du bois); EPFL (École Polytechnique Fédérale de Lausanne)
- Thesis: Triage et fiabilité des bois de construction: validité de la méthode ultrason (1990)
- Doctoral advisor: Julius Natterer

Academic work
- Discipline: Engineering
- Sub-discipline: Wood construction
- Institutions: EPFL (École Polytechnique Fédérale de Lausanne)
- Website: https://cbs-cbt.com/

Jean-Luc Sandoz (born 1960 in Montandon) is a French-Swiss engineer and an expert in wood construction. He is the founder of several companies in the field of engineering, industrialization, construction and expertise, all related to wood. Formerly, he was a professor and lecturer at EPFL (École Polytechnique Fédérale de Lausanne).

== Career ==
Born into a family of farmers in the Haut-Doubs region, he became acquainted with the material wood, starting with a vocational training certificate in carpentry, followed by a BEP (vocational training certificate) in cabinetmaking, before joining the Lycée Bois de Mouchard in 1976, where he obtained a BTS (vocational training certificate) in wood construction.

After studies at ENSTIB (École Nationale Supérieure des Technologies et des Industries du Bois), in 1985, he began his thesis on the subject of ultrasound and the mechanical strength of wood, under the direction of Julius Natterer at EPFL. He obtained his PhD in 1990 for his thesis entitled "Triage et fiabilité des bois de construction: validité de la méthode ultrason" (Sorting and reliability of construction timber: validity of the ultrasonic method).

He continued research at the IBOIS (Laboratory for Timber Construction) at EPFL in two areas: non-destructive technologies to measure the mechanical quality of wood material and the optimisation of wooden structures for the application in large buildings.

In 1993, he was appointed assistant professor at EPFL. Together with Julius Natterer and Martial Rey, Sandoz authored the textbook "Construction en Bois" (Wood Construction that has remained in print since its release in 1996 (20 new editions).

During this period he organised several international symposia among them the Symposium on Nondestructive Testing of Wood and the World Conference on Timber Engineering.

He registered several patents such as for a device for measuring the characteristics of wood using ultrasound (Sylvatest), and an application for measuring wooden poles for overhead electricity and telephone lines (K-Store & Polux), as well as for the construction of wood and mixed wood-concrete slabs as the Ariane truss.

In 1999, Sandoz left the academic world to devote himself to his company CBS-Lifteam.

Dr Sandoz has been a contributor and organizer of international symposiums on NDT for wood, dating back to the late 1980s in the northwest of the USA. He was the organizer and host of the 1996 event in Montreux, Switzerland, and spoke about Polux on tropical wood in the Brazil event in 2024. In May 2026, Dr Sandoz is speaking in the 24th International NDT Symposium in Vicksburgh, MS.

== Wooden structures ==
Sandoz integrates wood in all types of structures and buildings and optimises spans and heights, as well as for thermal and acoustic performance. Several of his projects won awards.

Examples of Sandoz' structures:

- In 2000, he inspected the wooden structure of the Valère Basilica in Sion.
- For the Swiss national exhibition Expo.02 in 2002, he designed and built the offshore platforms that were placed on the lakes of Neuchâtel and Bienne to house the temporary exhibition pavilions. Made of local wood, the entire wooden structure was dismantled and reused after the expo period.
- In 2006–2007, he inspected the residual performance of the wooden structure of the Forbidden City in Beijing
- In 2017, he collaborated on the construction of the Guiana Space Centre and helped with the characterisation and employment of local wood from the Amazonian forest.
- In 2019, he used wood to clad the Vortex building, which served as the Olympic village for the 2020 Winter Youth Olympic Games in Lausanne before taking on its present function as student accommodation
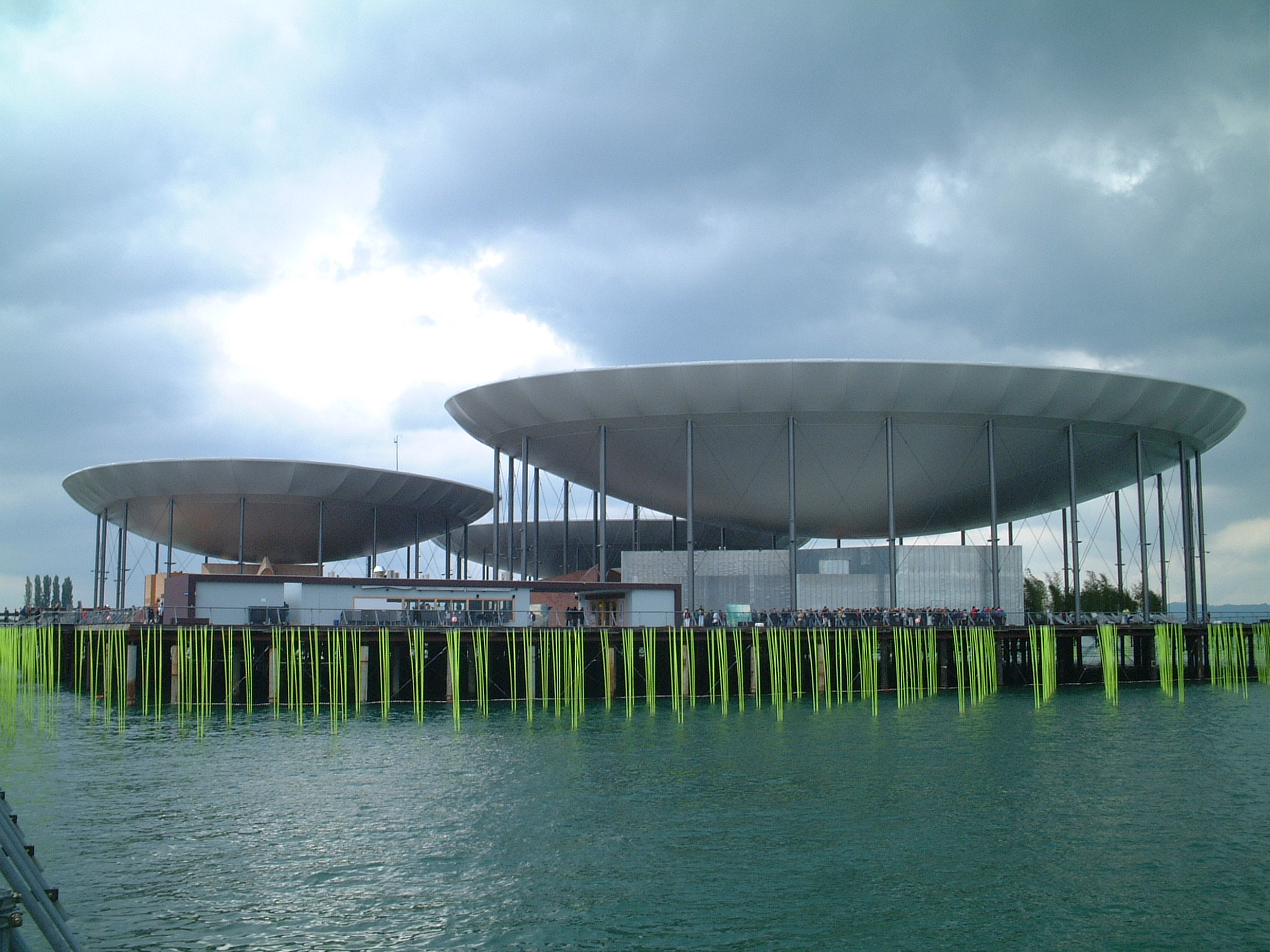
Expo.02 in Neuchâtel

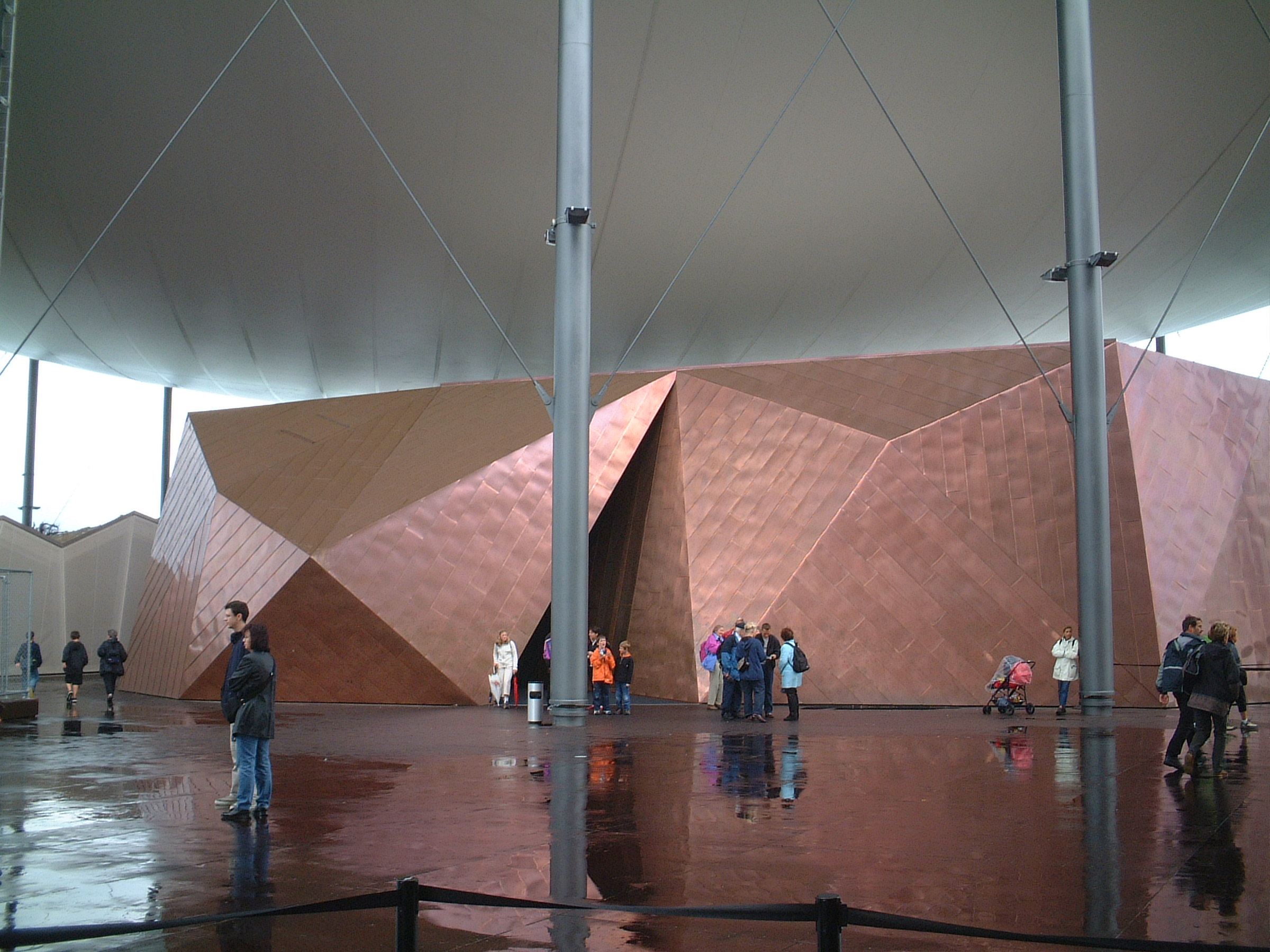
Expo.02 in Neuchâtel

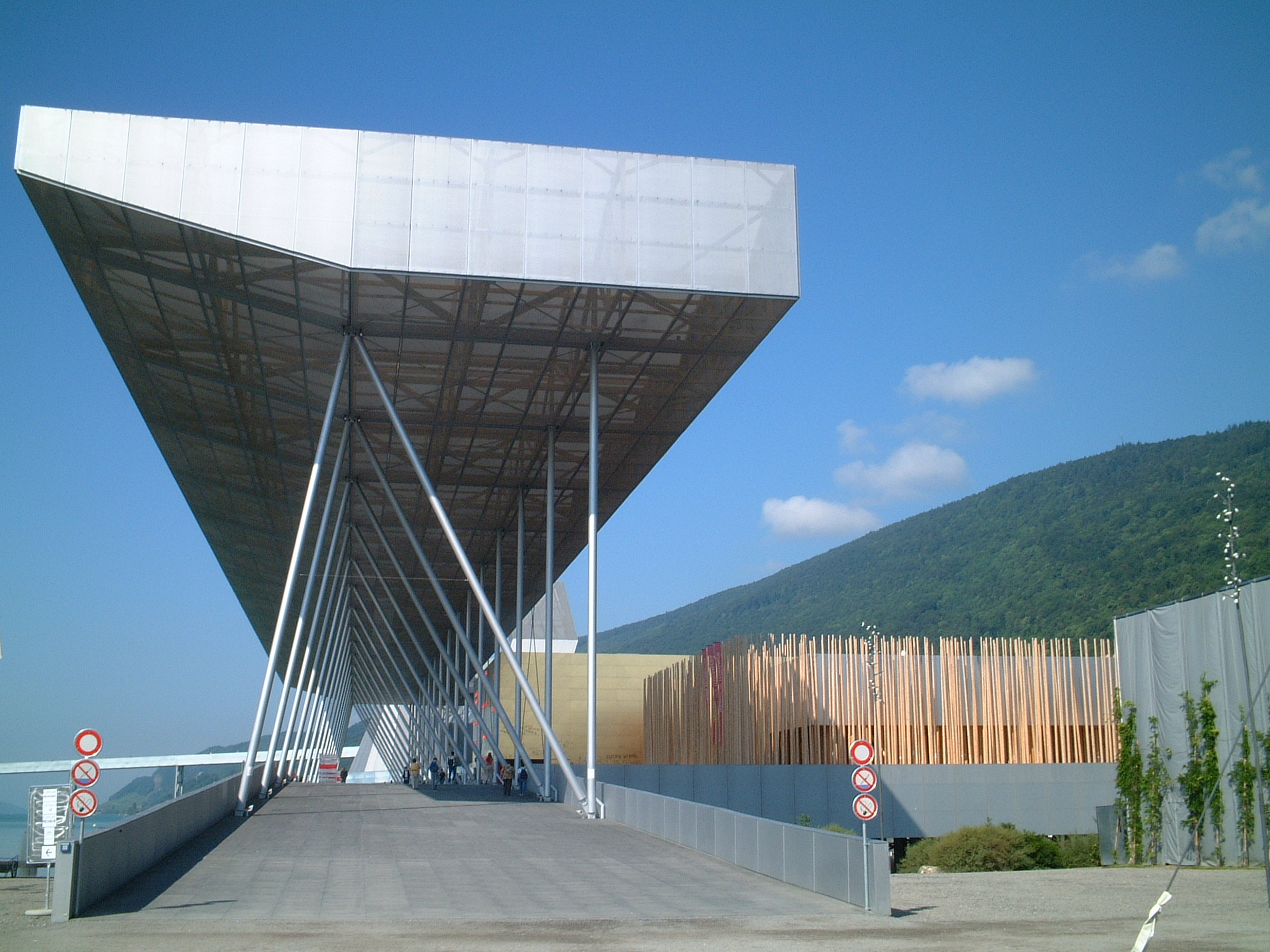
Expo.02 in Biel/Bienne

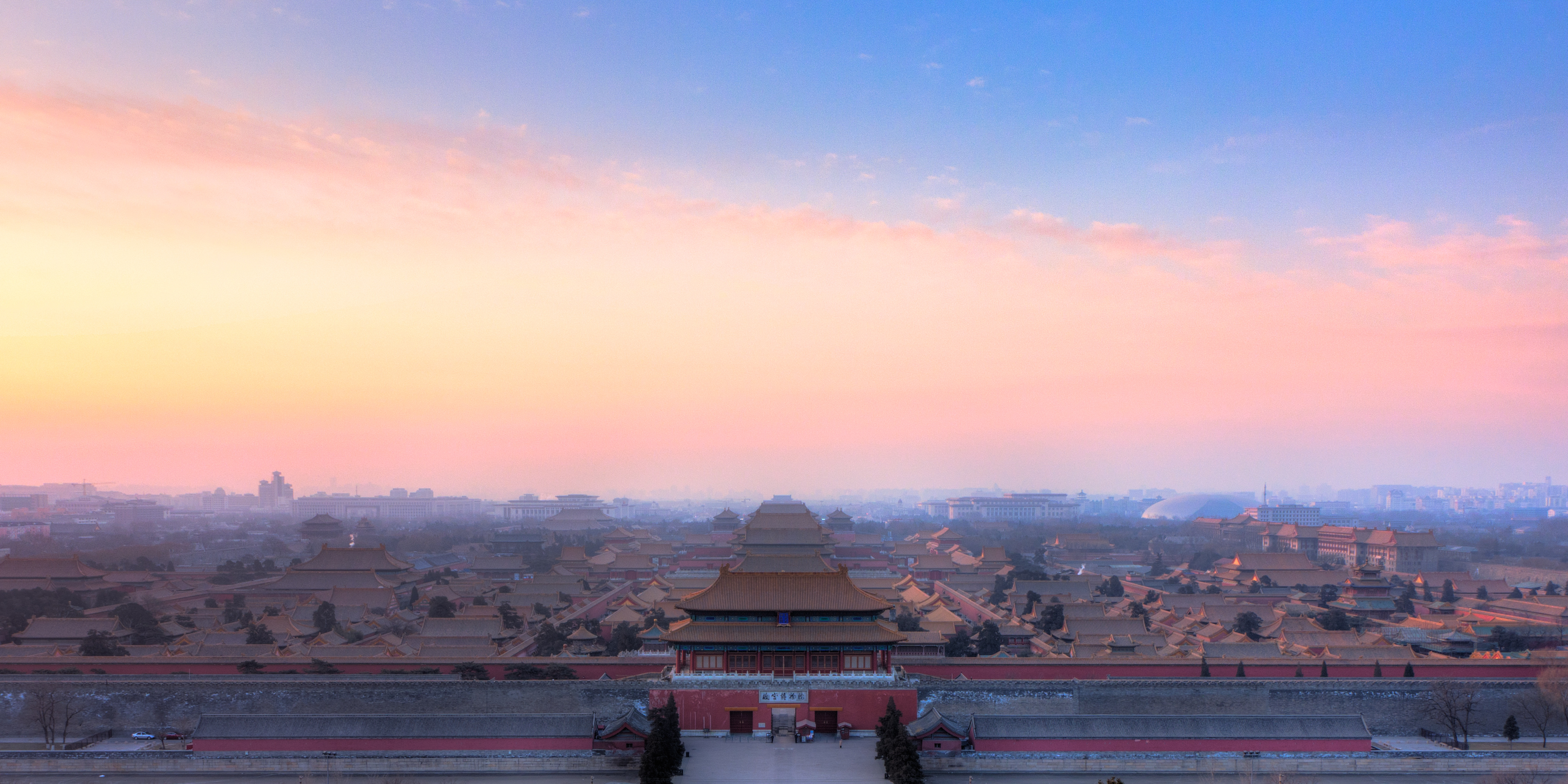
Forbidden City in Beijing

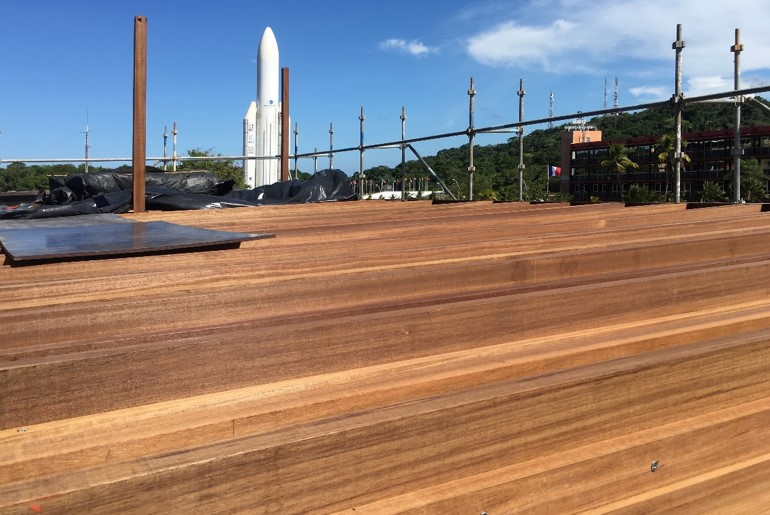
Wood characterisation at the Guiana Space Centre in Kourou

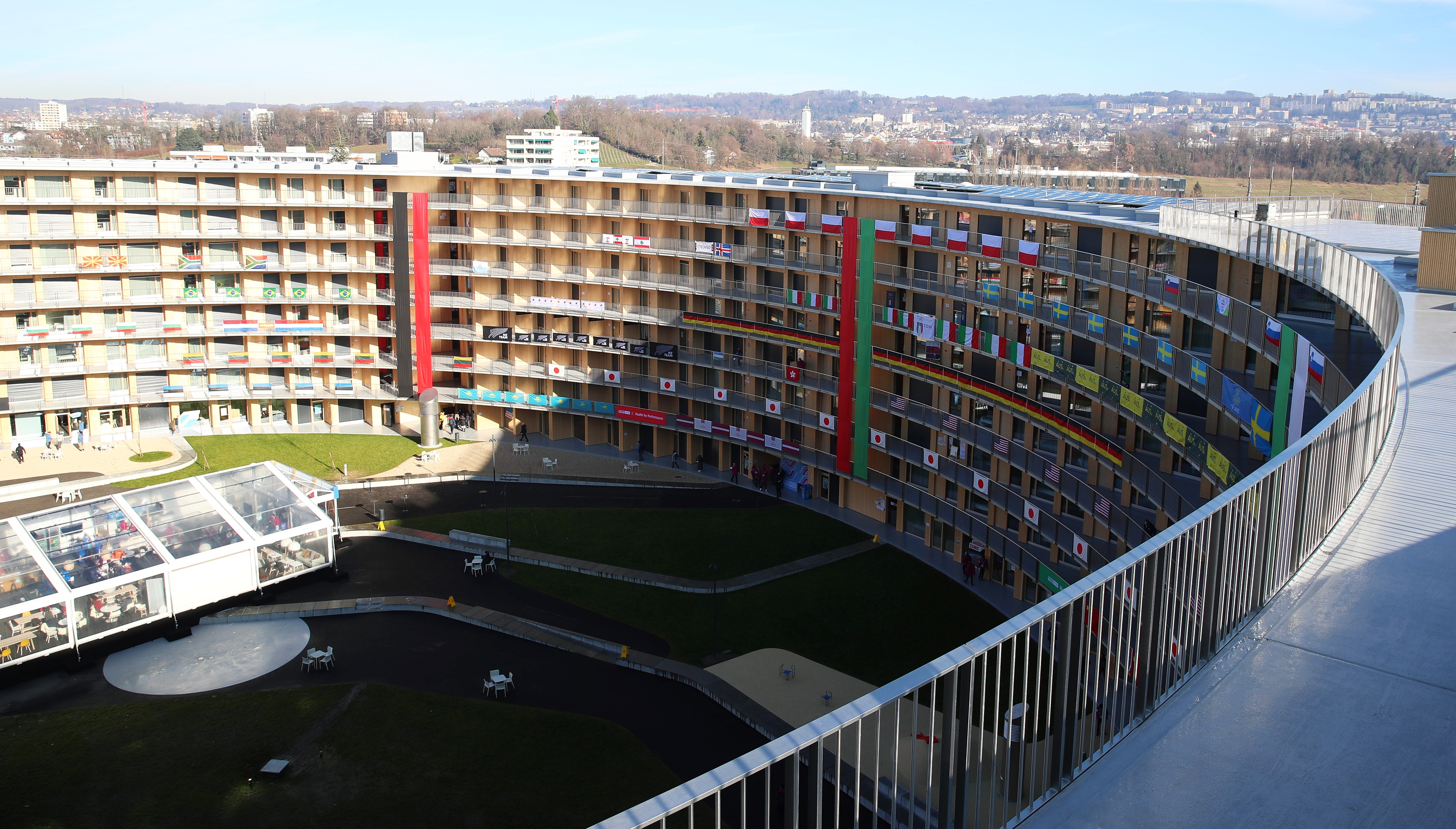
Wooden façade at the Vortex building in Lausanne

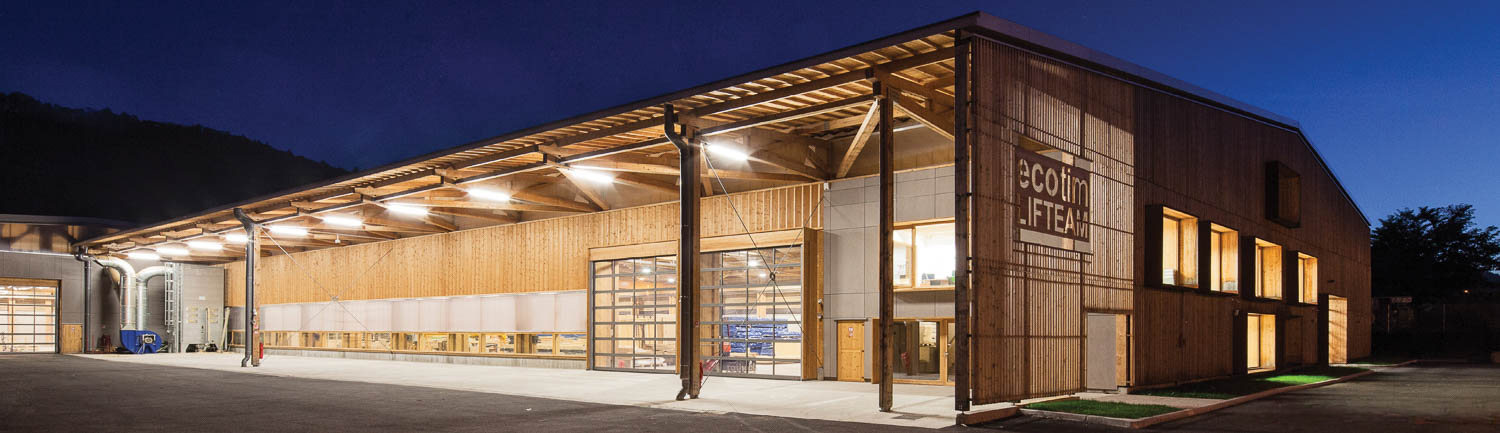
Ecotim II - Industrial building - Architecture Amiot Lombard

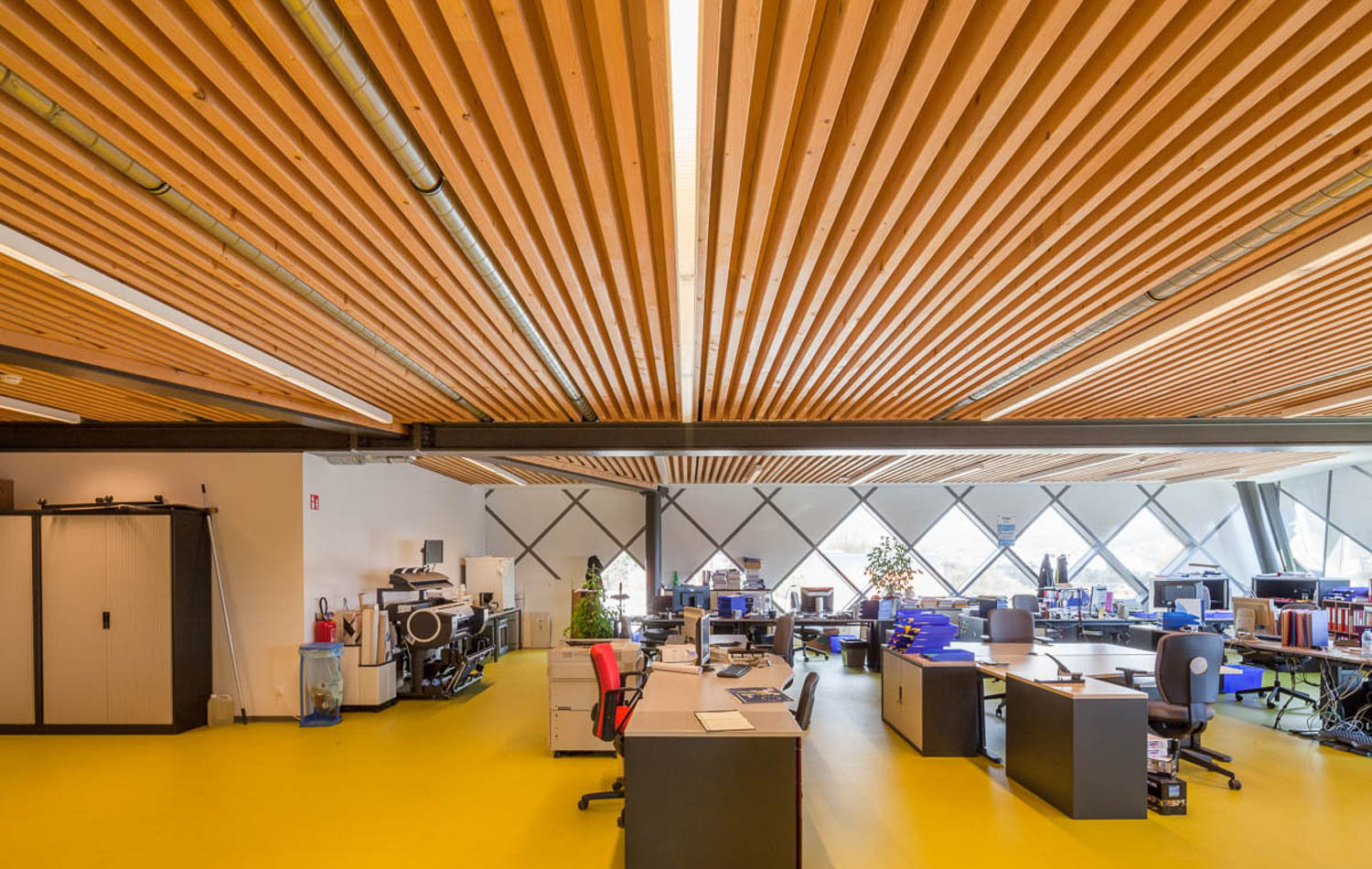
Herstal City Hall - Frédéric Haesevoets Architecture

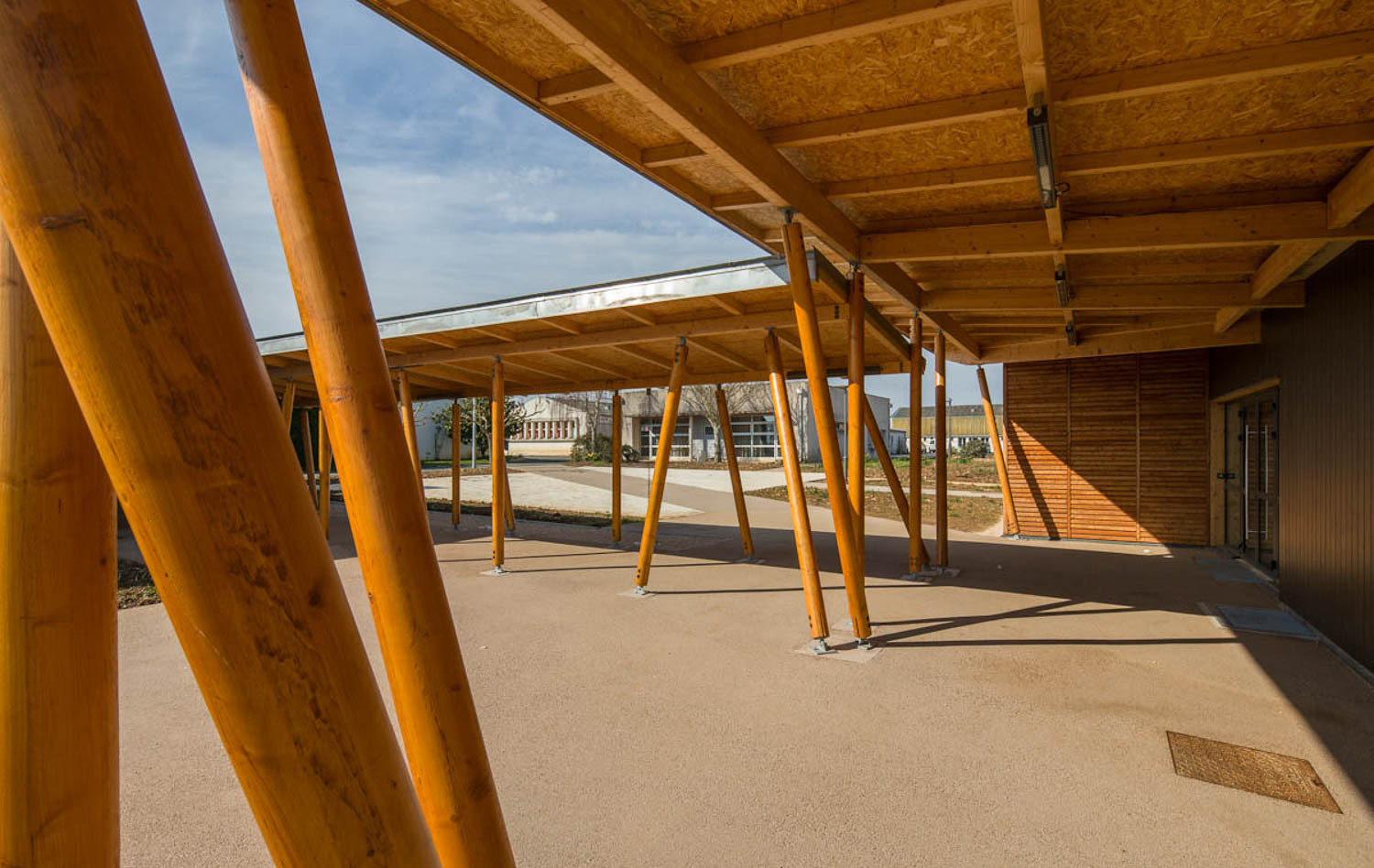
High school in Vendée, 2013 - Frédéric Fonteneau architect

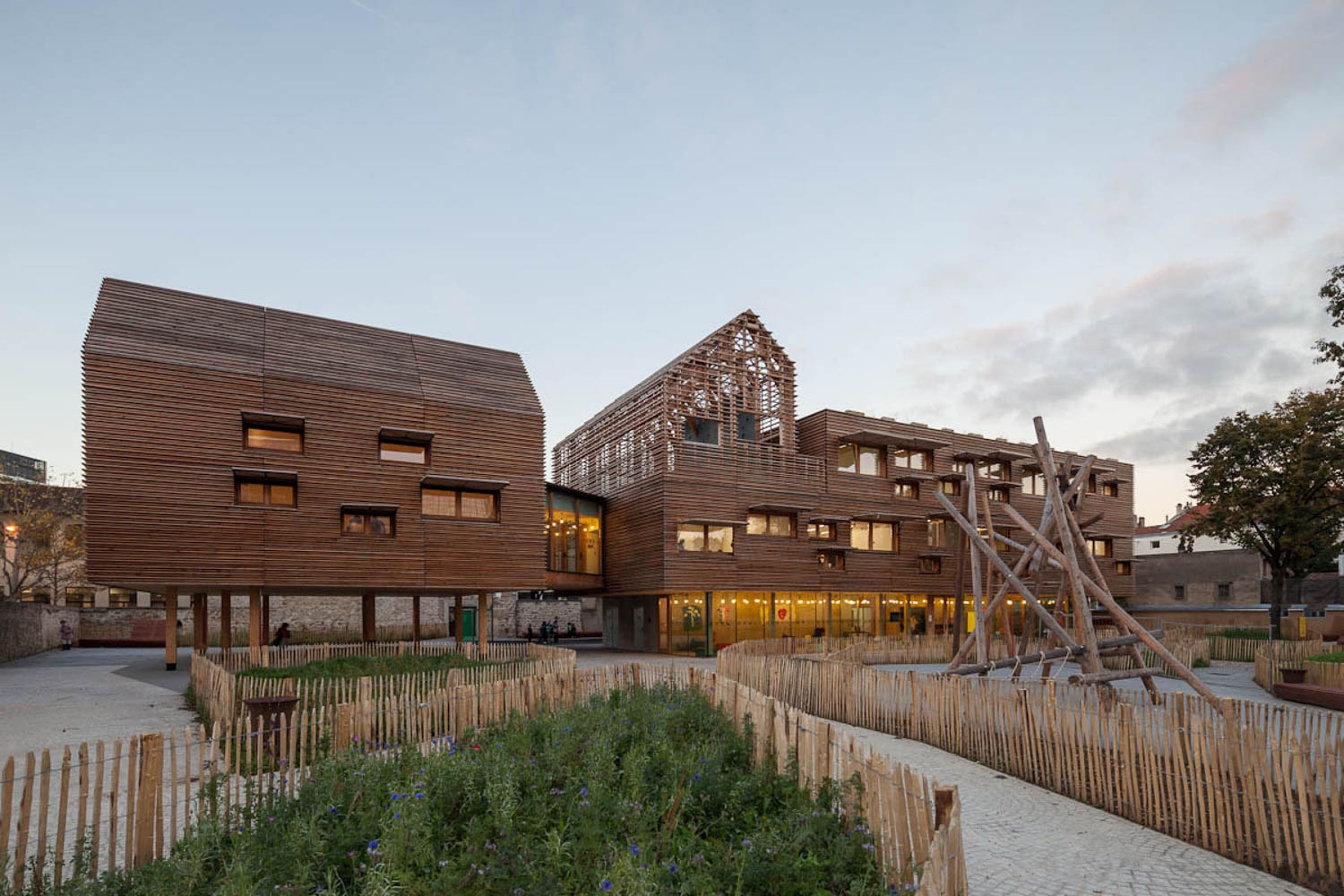
School in Courbevoie, 2013 - K-Architecture

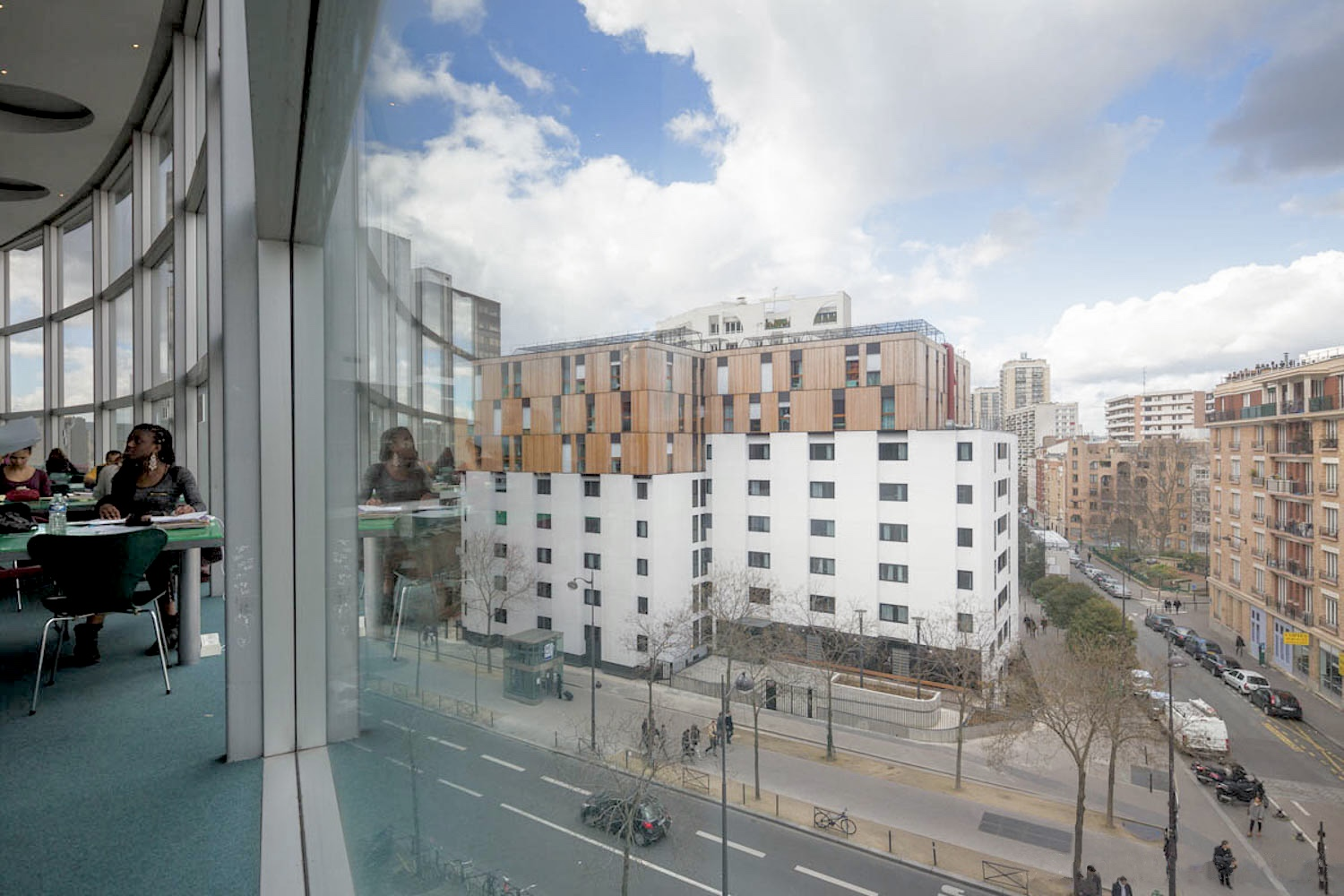
Wood elevation in Paris-Tolbiac, 2013 - Atelier Marie Schweitzer

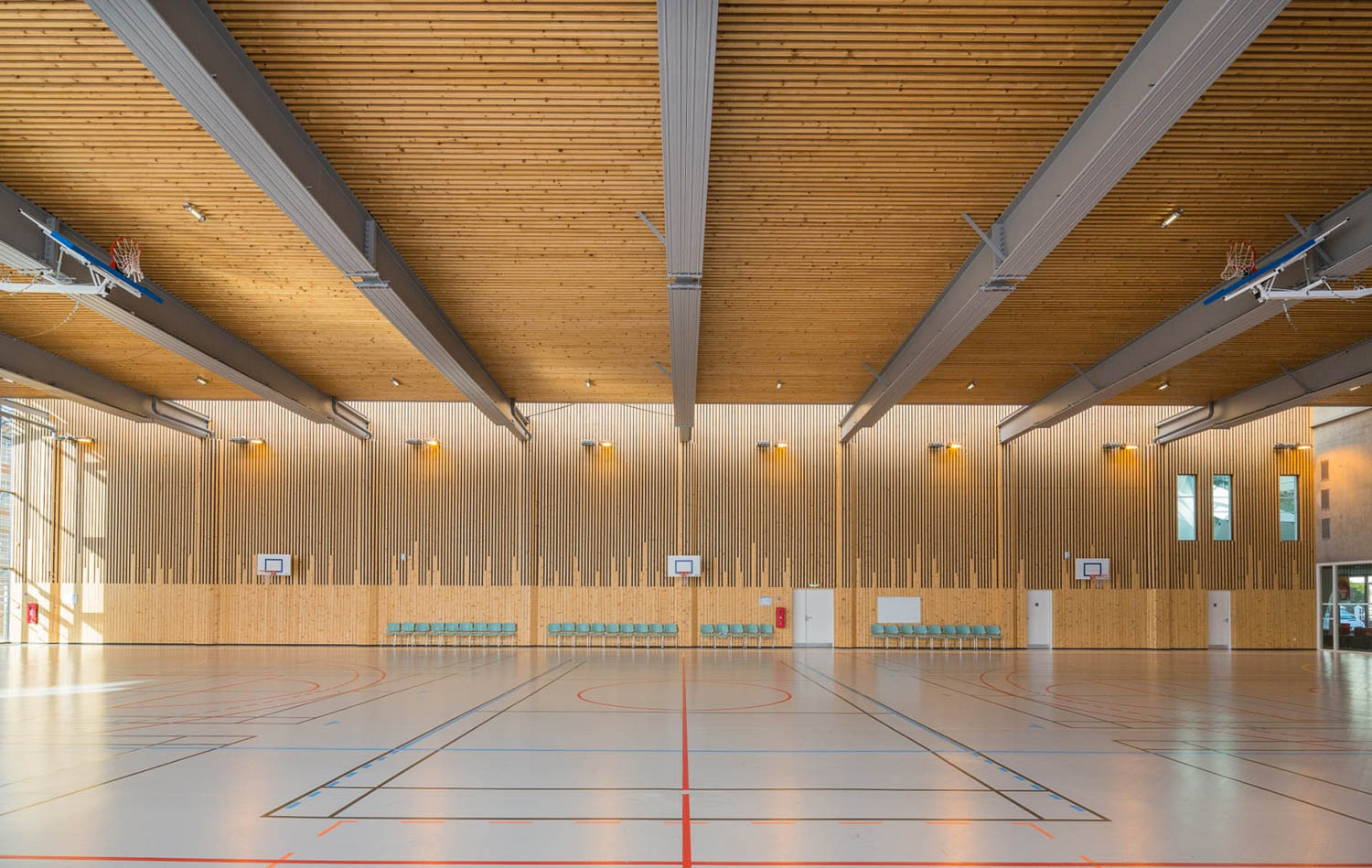
Sport Hall in Villeneuve-la-Garenne, 2011 - Tessier Poncelet Architects

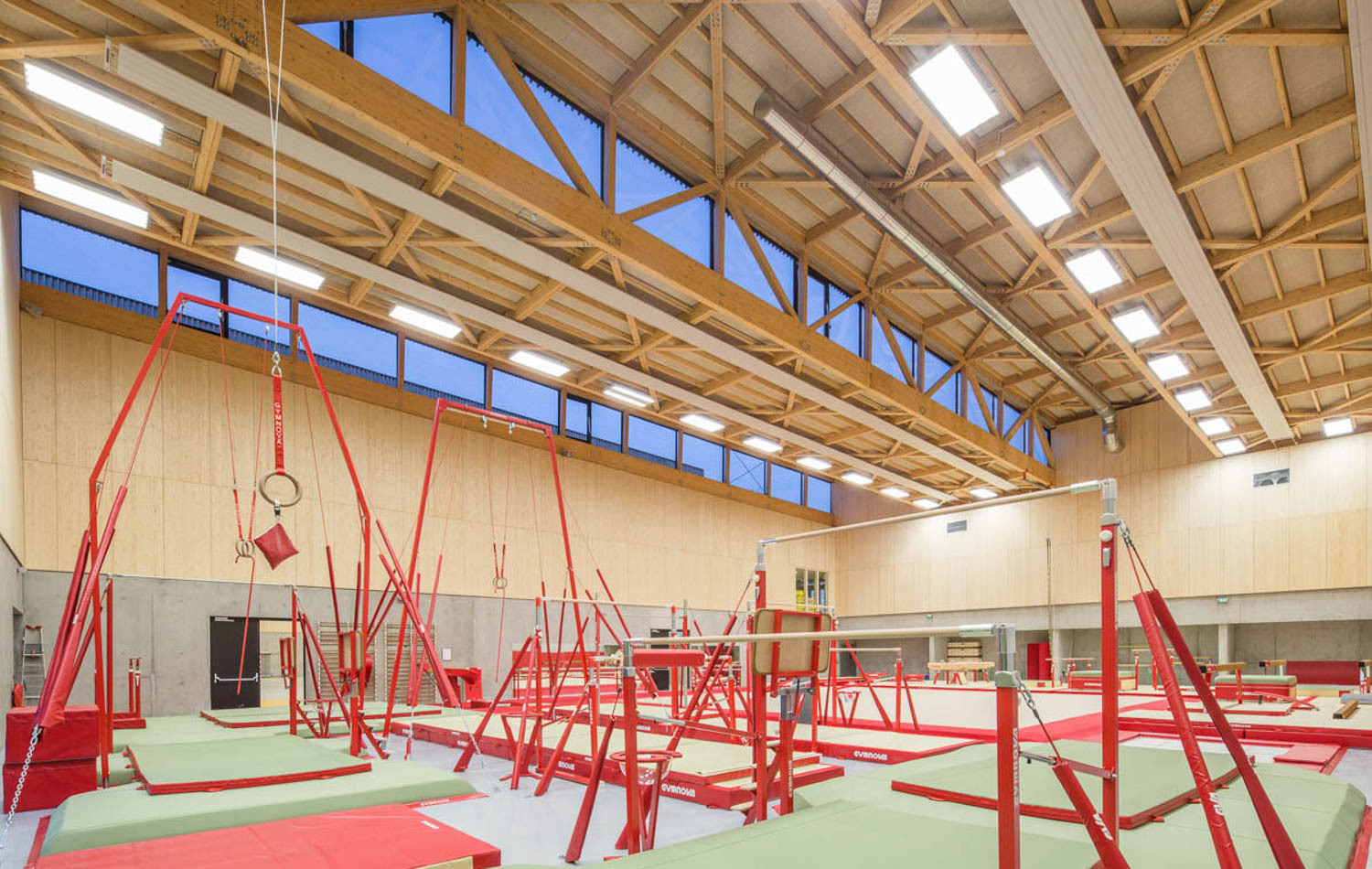
Sport Hall Hacine-Chérifi price World Architecture News in 2015

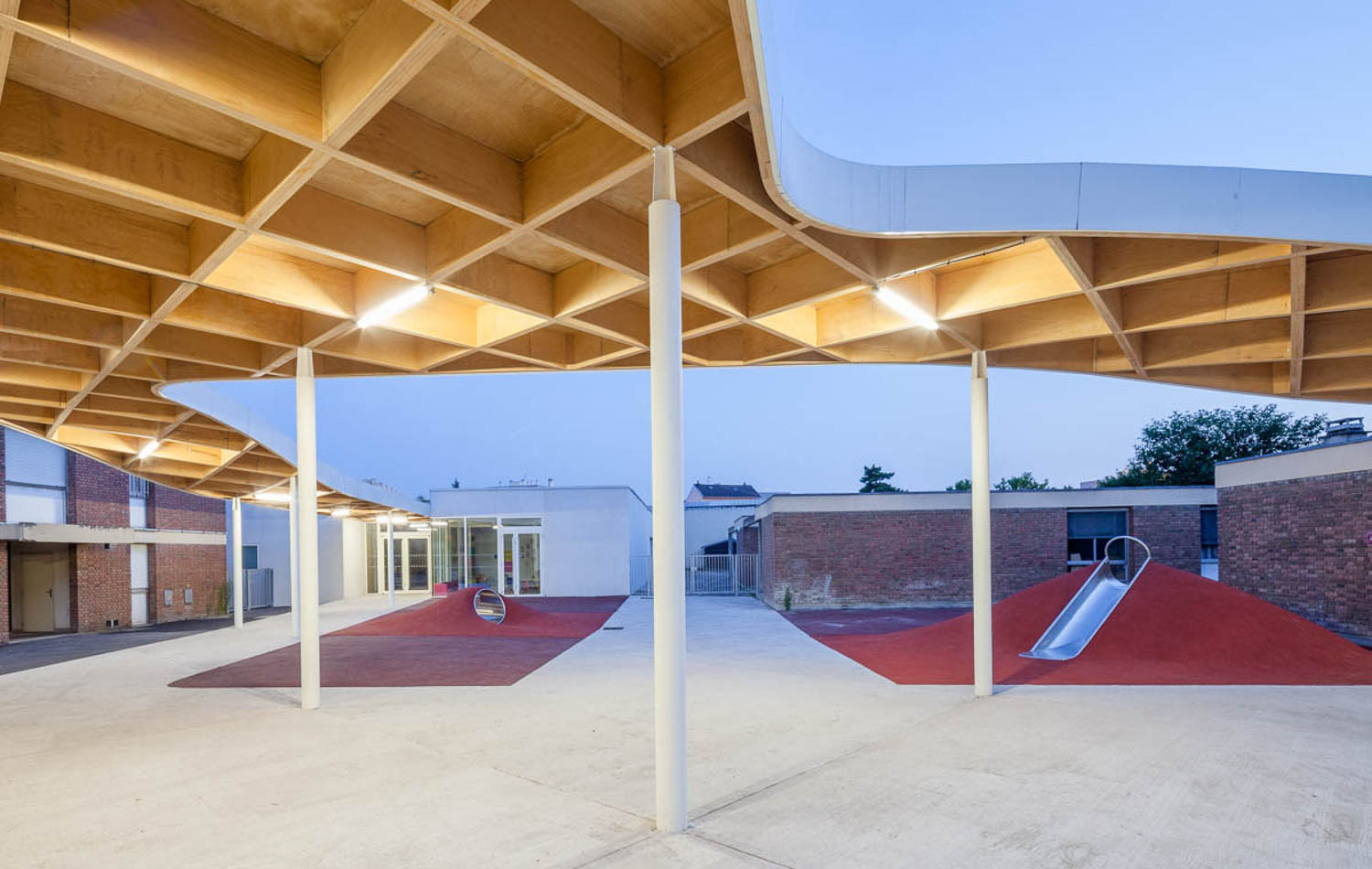
Charlie Chaplin School, 2014 - SAM Architecture

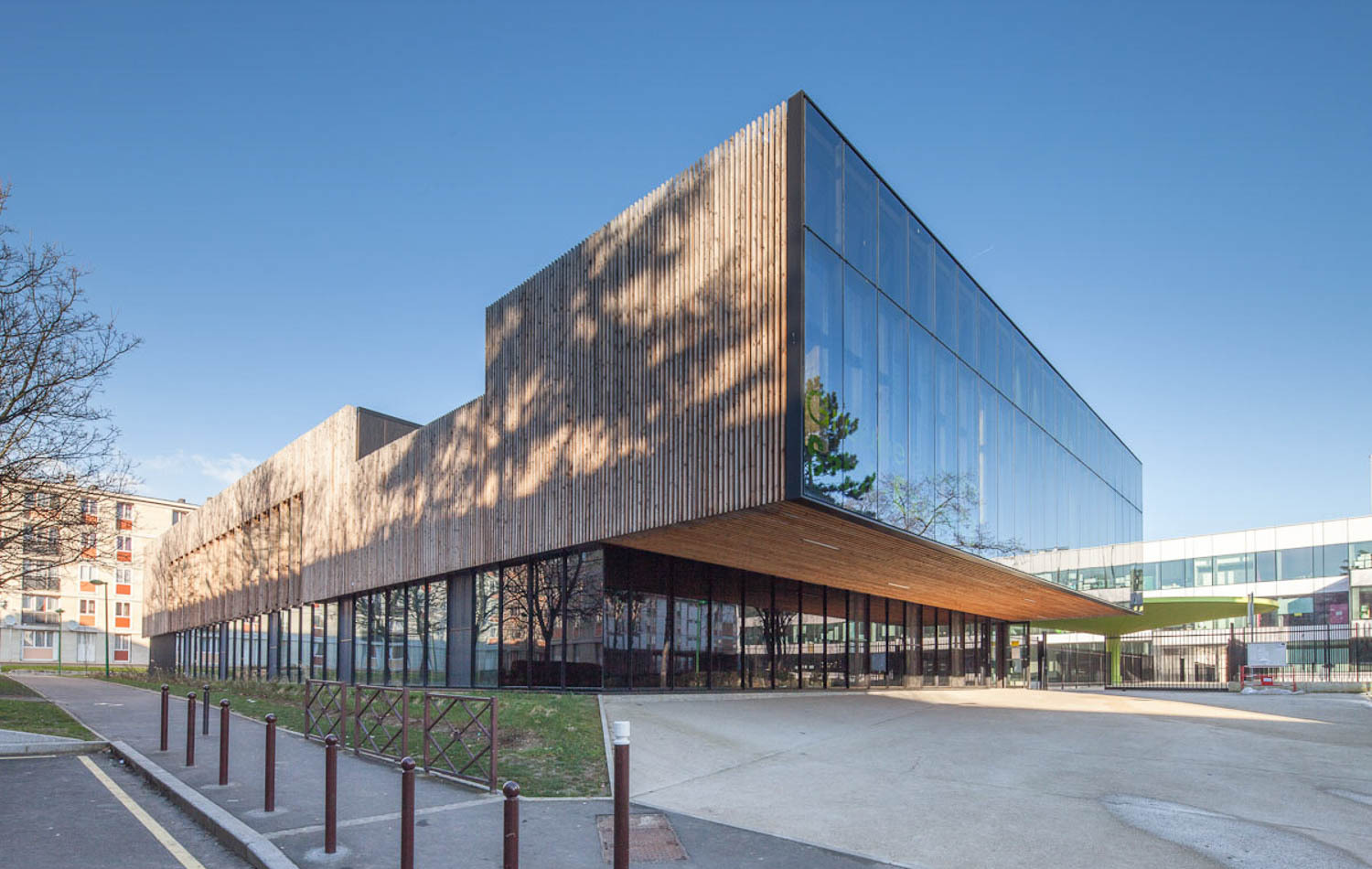
School Saint-Exupéry in Sarcelles, 2011 - Gaëtan Le Penhuel Architectes

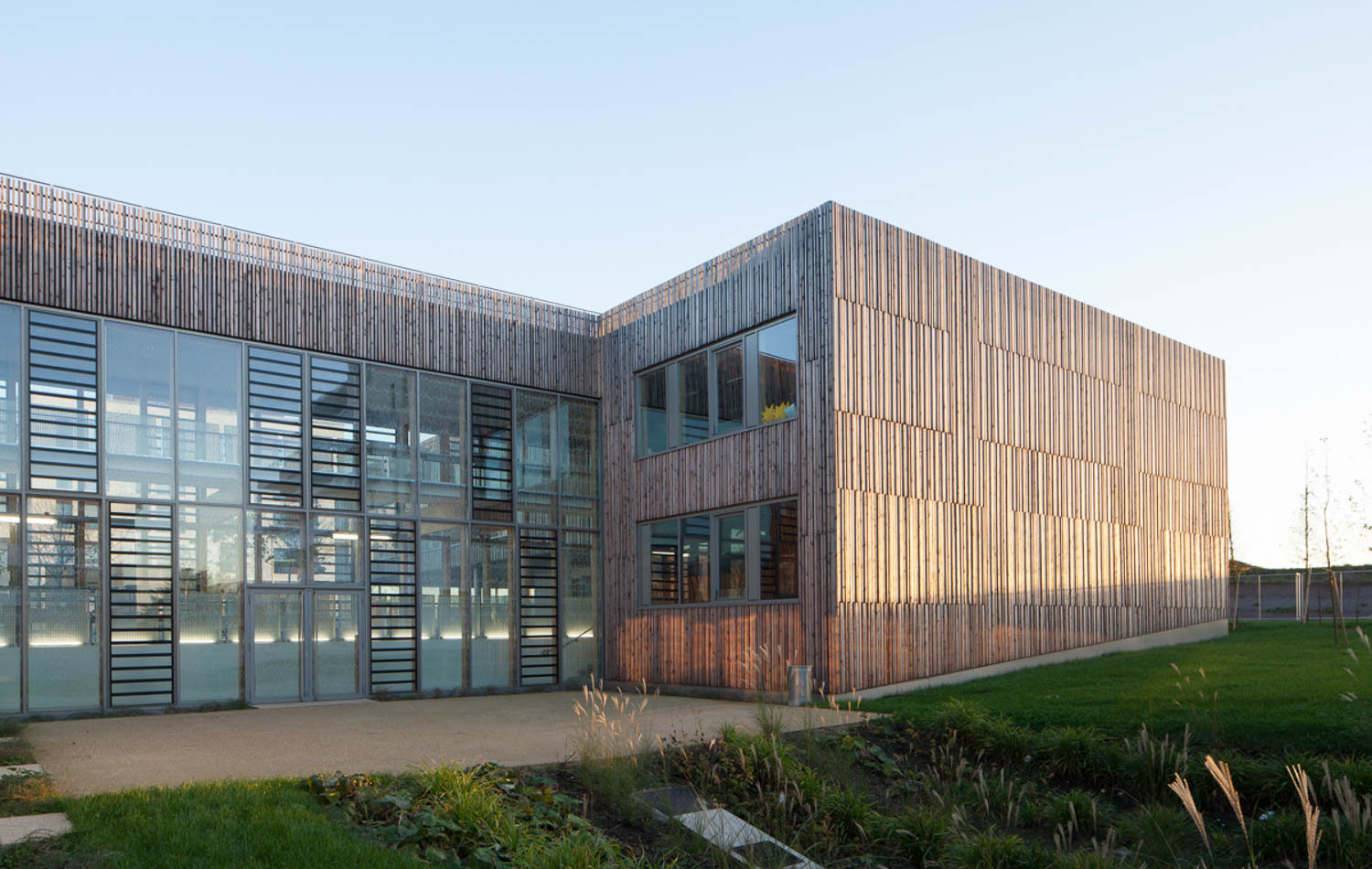
School Brétigny-sur-Orge, 2013 - TOA Architectes

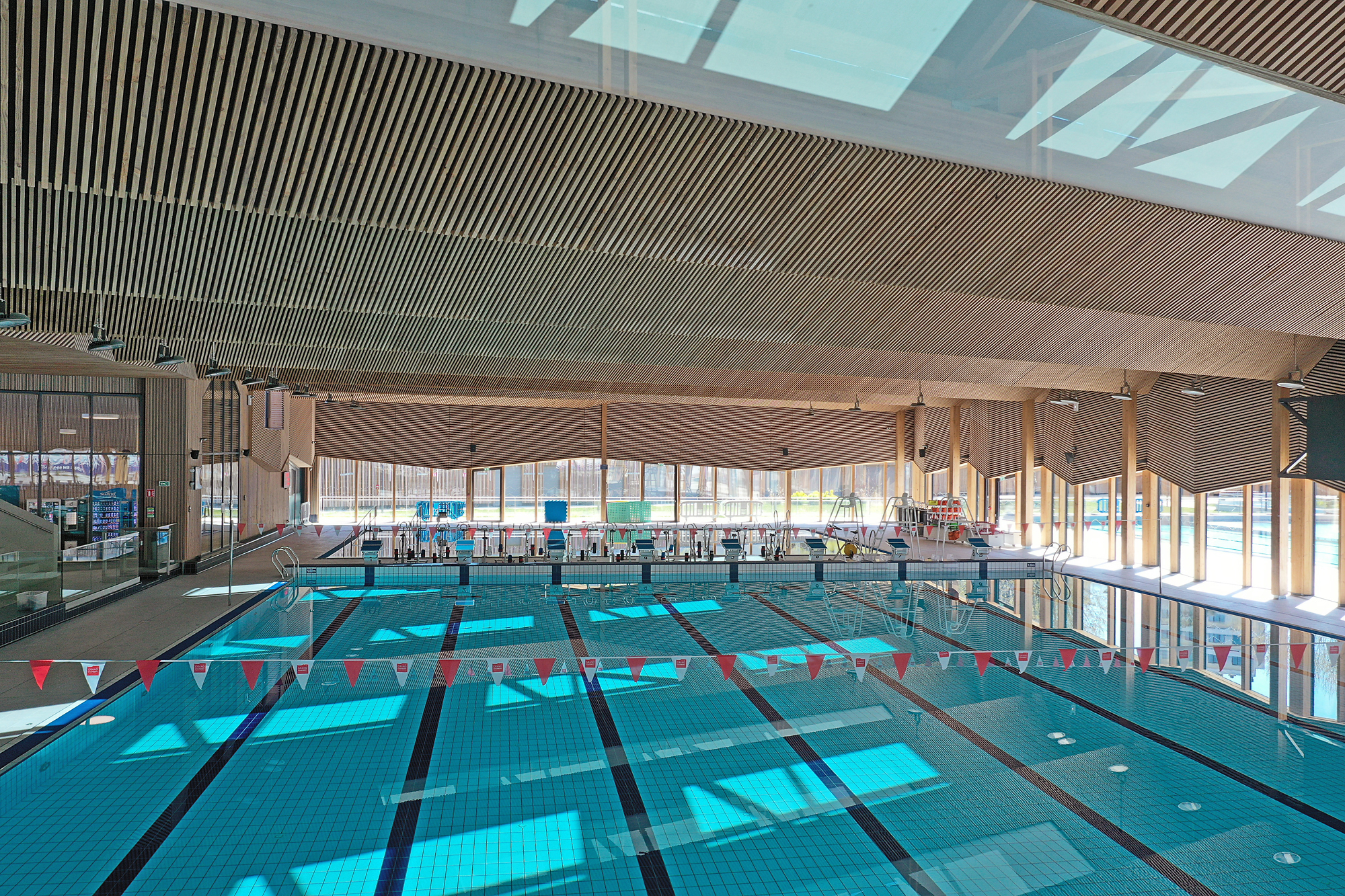
Grand Chambéry Pool, 2020 - ALN Atelien Architecture

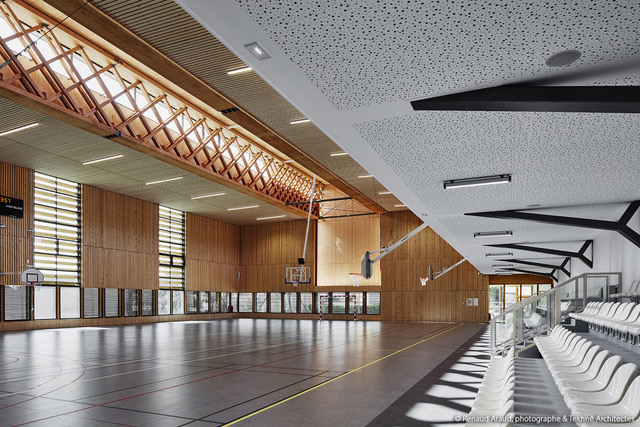
Sport hall in Donzère with record of 45m

Renovation for the city of Paris with Marie Schweitzer architect

Standing apartment rue de Javel with Marie Schweitzer architect

== Selected works ==
- Sandoz, J. L. (February 1989). "Grading of construction timber by ultrasound". Wood Science and Technology. 23 (1): 95–108. doi:10.1007/bf00350611. ISSN 0043-7719. S2CID 20528505.
- Sandoz, J.L. (July 1993). "Moisture content and temperature effect on ultrasound timber grading". Wood Science and Technology. 27 (5). doi:10.1007/bf00192223. ISSN 0043-7719. S2CID 30735904.
- Construction en bois : matériau, technologie et dimensionnement. Julius K. Ingénieur civil, Allemagne, Suisse, - Natterer, Jean-Luc Ingénieur, - Sandoz, Martial Rey, Maurice Fiaux, Julius K. Civil engineer, Germany, Switzerland, - Natterer, Julius K. Bauingenieur, Deutschland, Schweiz, - Natterer (2e éd. rev. et augm.; éd. broché ed.). Lausanne: Presses Polytechniques et Universitaires Romandes. 2011. ISBN 978-2-88074-949-1. OCLC 786446200.
