= Montandon (disambiguation) =

Montandon is a commune in the Doubs department in the Franche-Comté region in eastern France.

Montandon may also refer to:

== Places ==
- Montandon, Pennsylvania, a census-designated place in Northumberland County, Pennsylvania, United States

== People ==
- Arnold Lucien Montandon (1852–1922), French entomologist
- George Montandon (1879–1944), Swiss French anthropologist
- Gil Montandon (born 1965), Swiss ice hockey player
- Mike Montandon (born 1963), American politician and former mayor of Las Vegas
- Patricia Montandon (1928–2025), American author
- Philippe Montandon (born 1982), Swiss footballer
