= Diller Scofidio + Renfro =

Design and architecture studio in New York City

Practice information
- Firm type: Architectural design
- Partners: Elizabeth Diller, Ricardo Scofidio, Charles Renfro, Benjamin Gilmartin
- Founded: 1981
- Location: Starrett-Lehigh Building; New York City, United States

Significant works and honors
- Buildings: High Line; Alice Tully Hall; Institute of Contemporary Art; The Broad; The Shed; 15 Hudson Yards; Museum of Modern Art (expansion)
- Awards: MacArthur Genius Award (Diller and Scofidio); National Design Award from the Smithsonian; Brunner Prize from American Academy of Arts and Letters; AIA President's Award; Centennial Medal of Honor from American Academy in Rome; Lifetime Achievement Award National Academy of Design

Website
- dsrny.com

Diller Scofidio + Renfro is an American interdisciplinary design studio which integrates architecture, the visual arts, and the performing arts. Based in New York City, the studio was founded by architects Elizabeth Diller and Ricardo Scofidio in 1981. Charles Renfro joined in 1997, and was named partner in 2004. Benjamin Gilmartin became the firm's fourth partner in 2015.

The studio's international body of work includes notable examples of urban landscape design, such as the High Line in New York and Zaryadye Park in Moscow; institutional buildings, including museums such as The Broad and the United States Olympic & Paralympic Museum; and various installations, exhibitions, and performance projects.

== Gallery ==
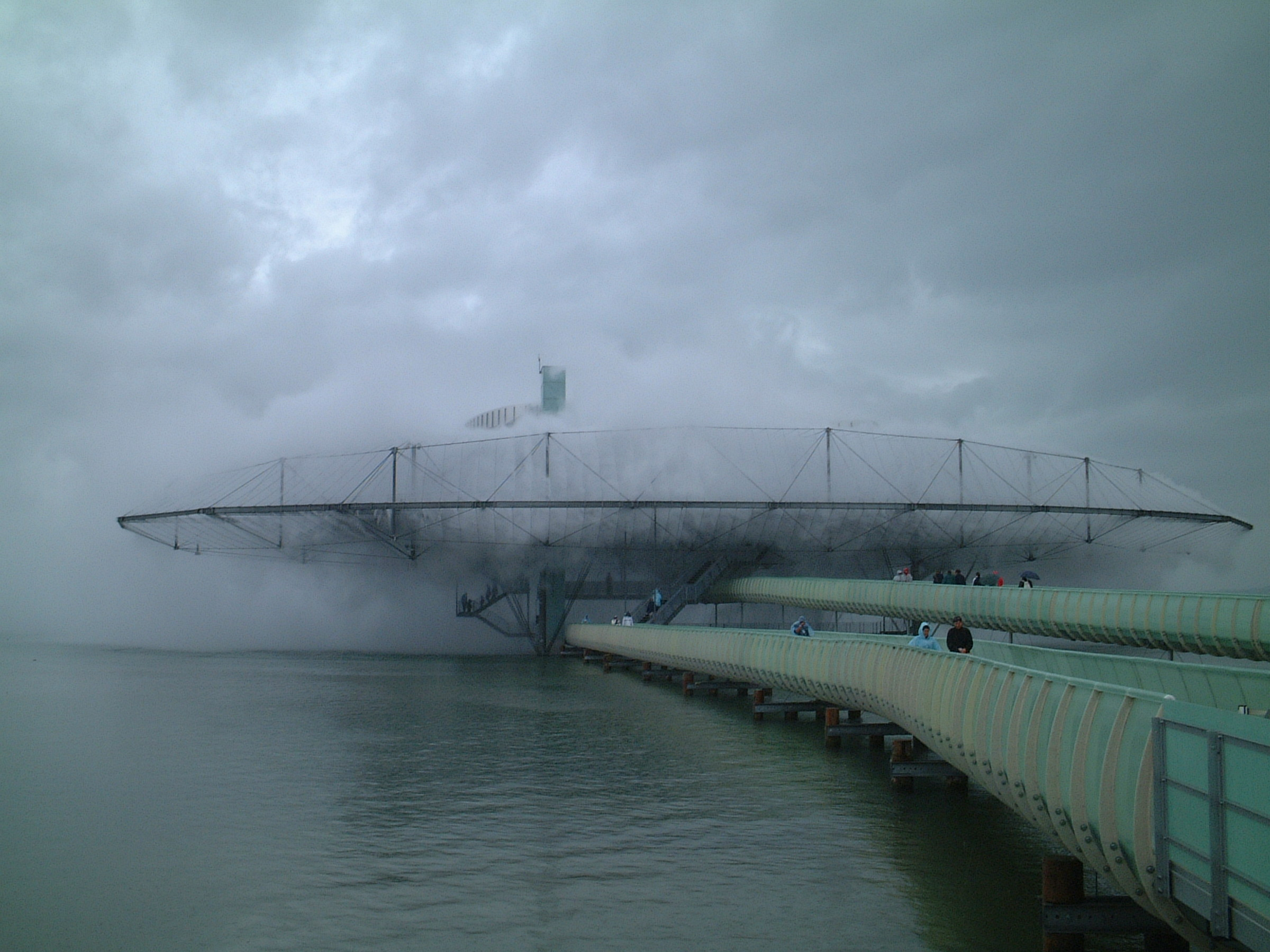
Blur Building at Expo.02 in Yverdon (2002)

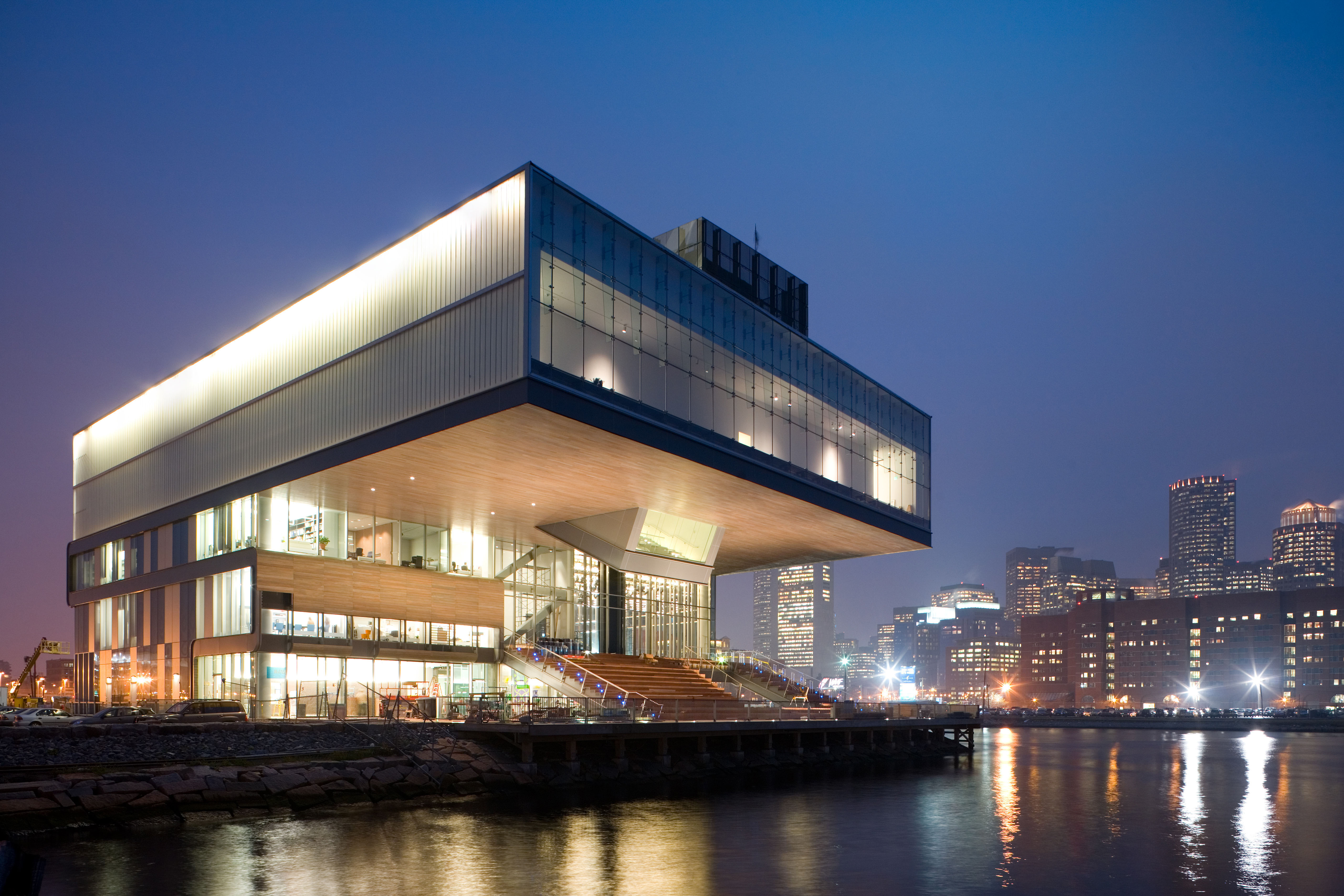
Institute of Contemporary Art, Boston (2007)

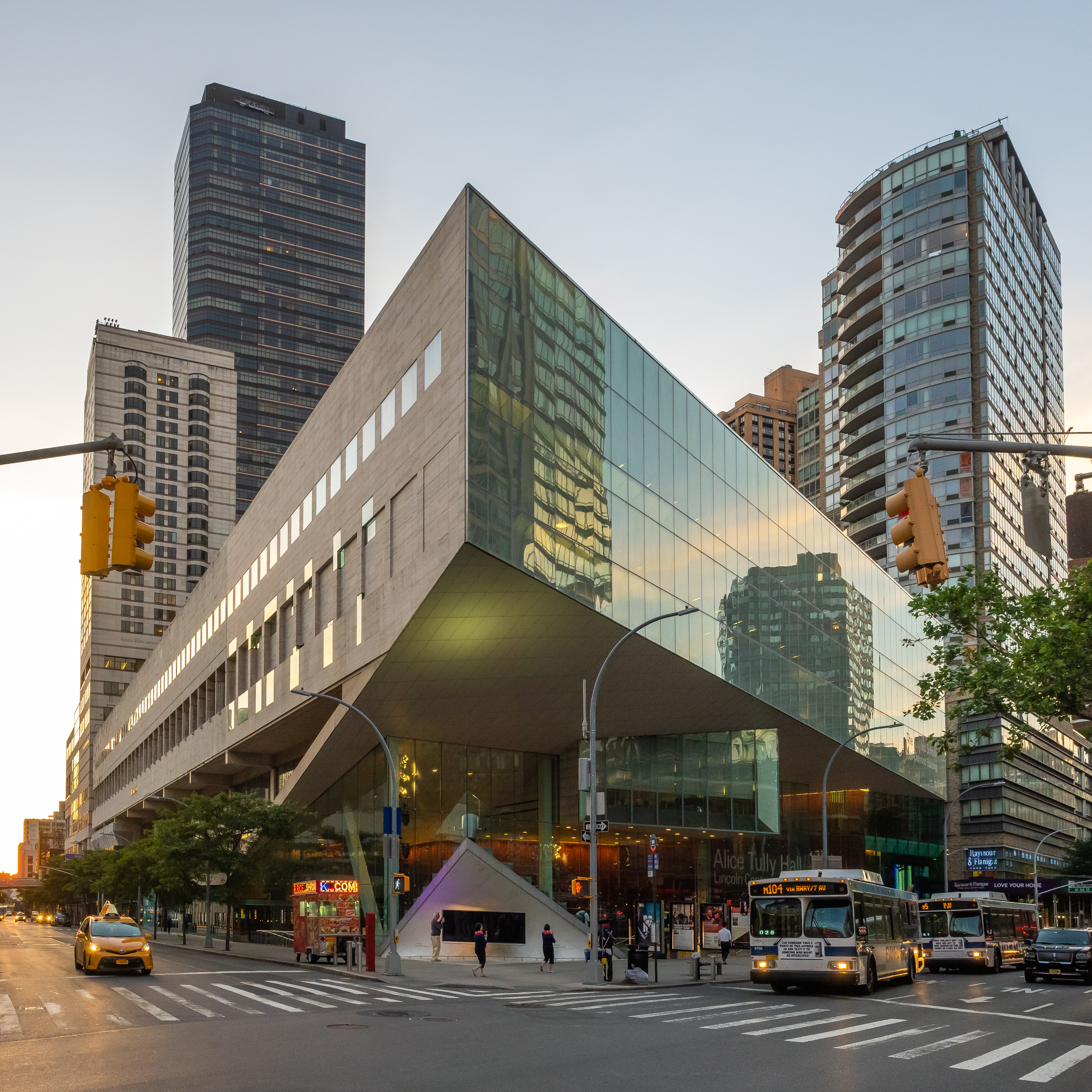
Alice Tully Hall, New York (2009)

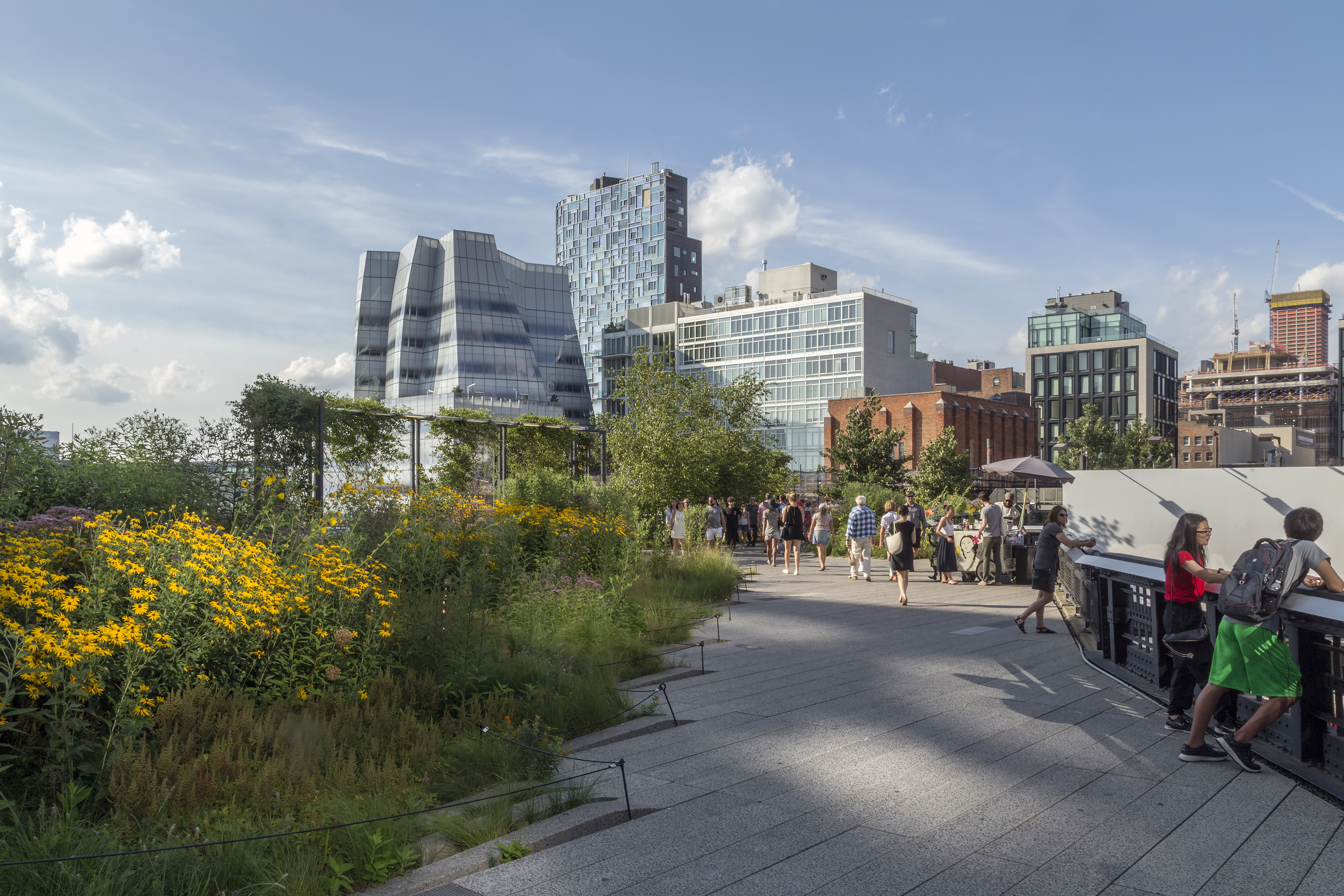
High Line, New York (2009–2014)

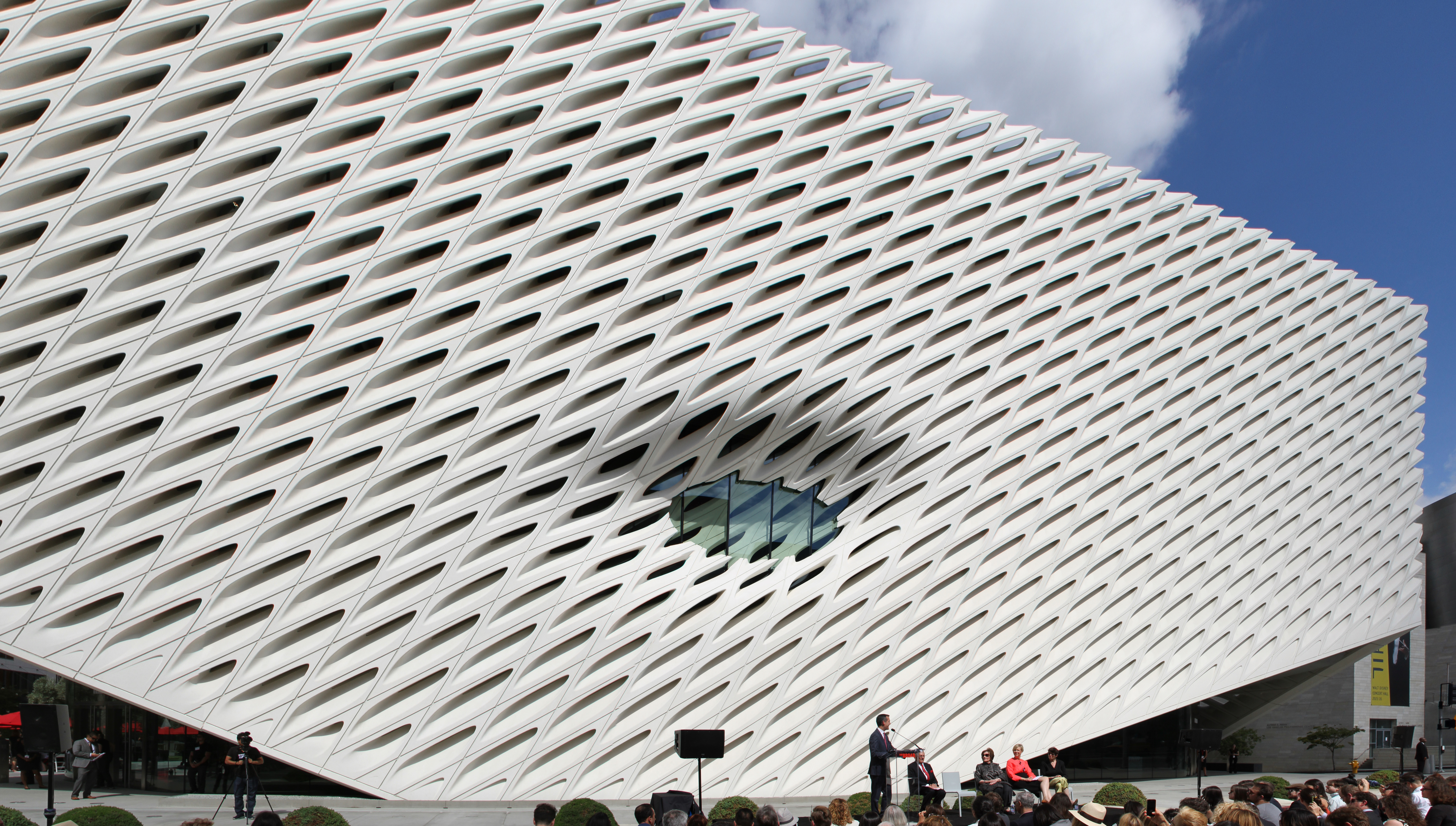
The Broad, Los Angeles (2015)

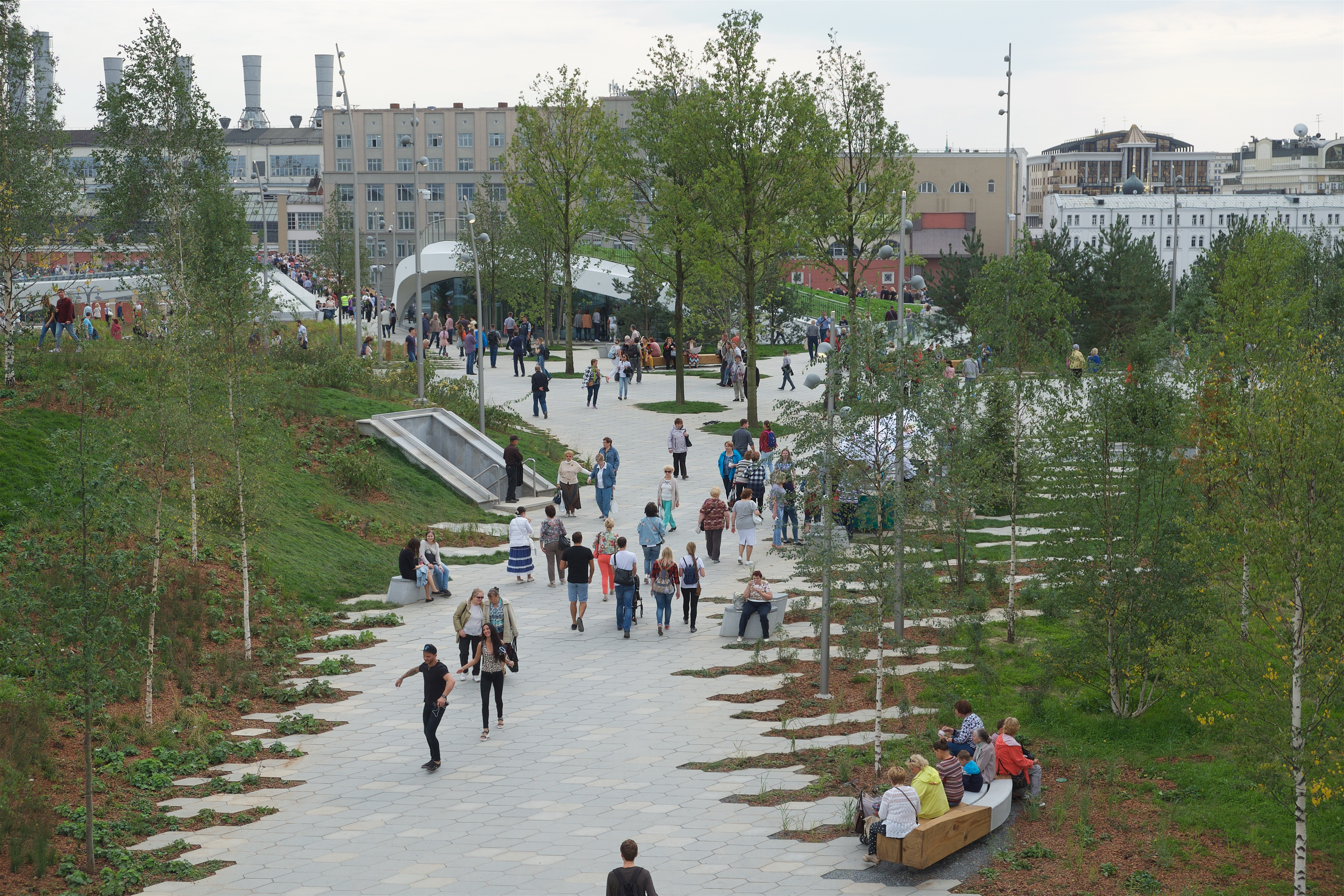
Zaryadye Park, Moscow (2017)

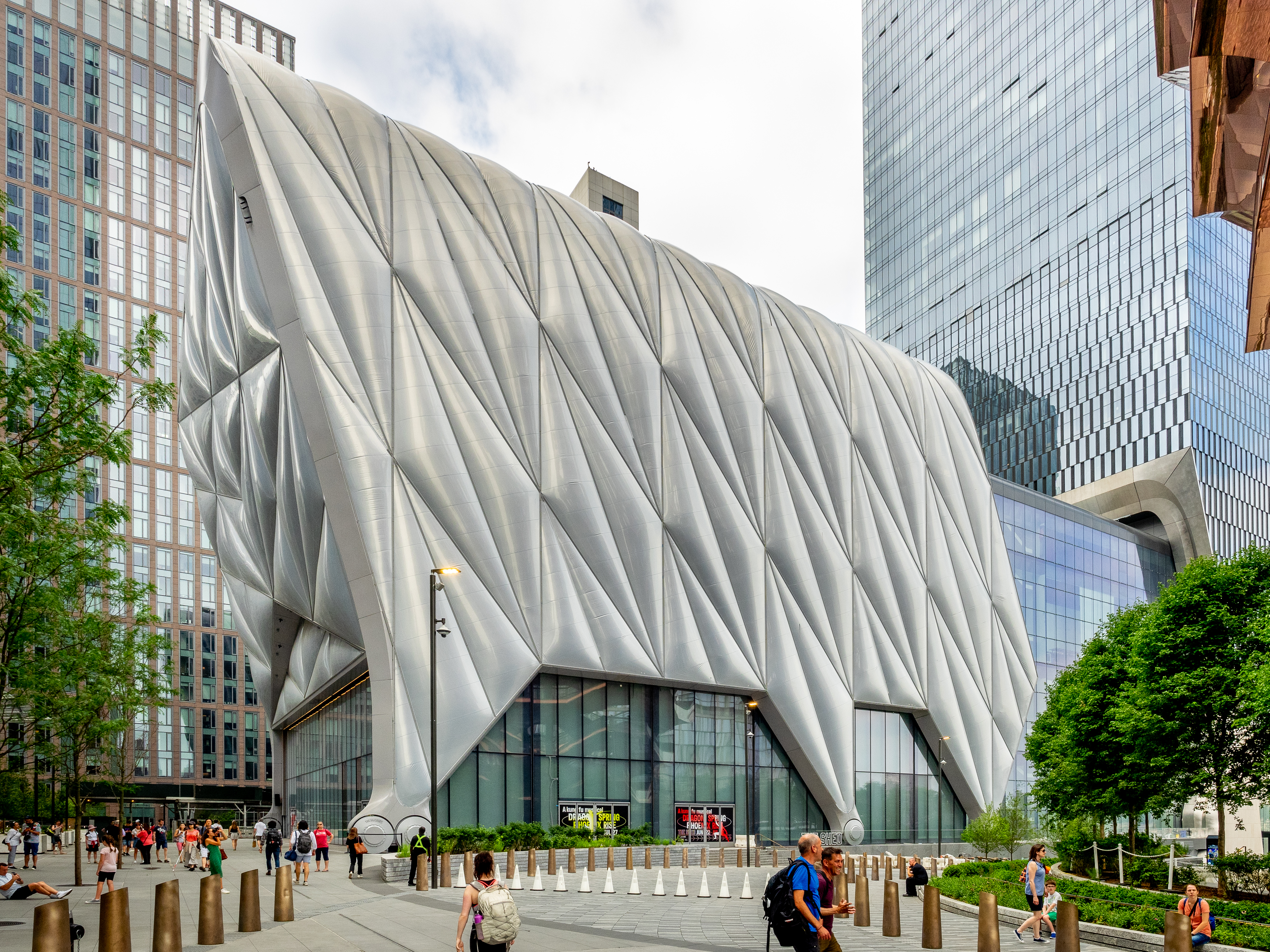
The Shed, New York (2019)

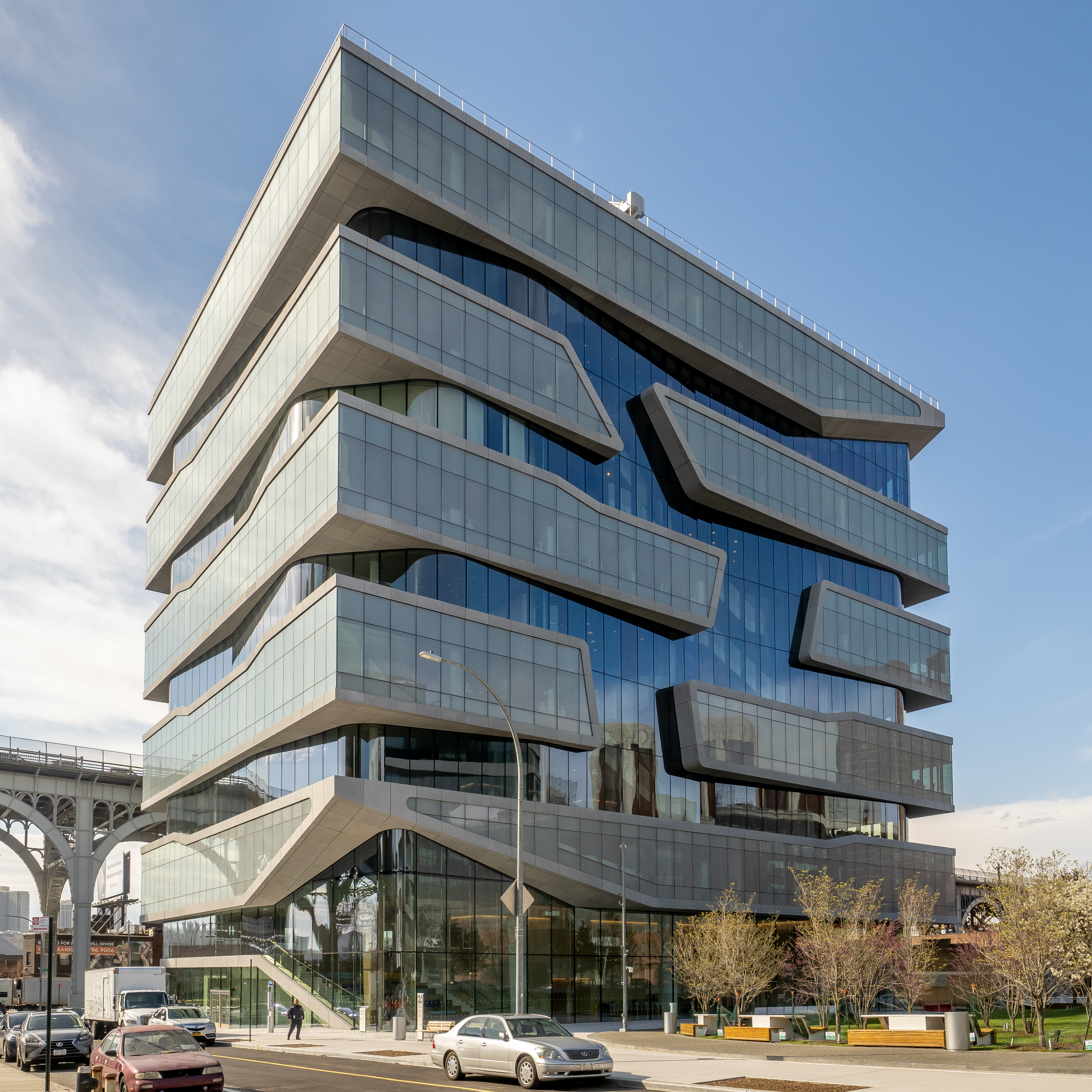
Henry R. Kravis Hall, Columbia Business School, New York (2022)

== Recognition ==
In 1999, Diller Scofidio + Renfro were the first architecture firm to be awarded a MacArthur Fellowship, with the MacArthur Foundation stating that the firm has "created an alternative form of architectural practice that unites design, performance, and electronic media with cultural and architectural theory and criticism. Their work explores how space functions in our culture and illustrates that architecture, when understood as the physical manifestation of social relationships, is everywhere, not just in buildings."

Since then, Diller Scofidio + Renfro have been inducted into the American Academy of Arts and Sciences and made fellows of the Royal Institute of British Architects. They have been awarded the National Design Award; the Brunner Prize from the American Academy of Arts and Letters; an Obie for off-Broadway theater production; the Centennial Medal of Honor from the American Academy in Rome; and various awards of the American Institute of Architects, including the AIA President's Award, the AIA Medal of Honor, the AIA Louis I. Kahn Award, and AIA Design Awards for numerous projects. In 2009, Elizabeth Diller and Ricardo Scofidio were named among the Time 100 Most Influential People in the World. In 2010, Fast Company named Diller Scofidio + Renfro the most innovative design practice in the profession and among the 50 most innovative companies in the world. More recent awards won by the firm have included the Lawrence Israel Prize (2012) and the Royal Academy of Arts' Architecture Prize (2019). The Rubenstein Forum in Chicago, which Diller Scofidio + Renfro completed in 2020, won the Tall Building Award in 2022.

For her work with the studio, Elizabeth Diller has been elected into the American Academy of Arts and Letters, selected as an Aspen Institute Harman-Eisner Artist in Residence, honored with the Barnard Medal of Distinction, and awarded the Jane Drew Prize (2019). In 2022, she was one of three architects awarded the Wolf Prize in Arts.

Multiple drawings, objects, and ephemera from the firm's early years are held in the collections of the Museum of Modern Art and the San Francisco Museum of Modern Art. In 2003, the Whitney Museum of American Art held an early-career retrospective of the studio's work, Scanning: The Aberrant Architectures of Diller + Scofidio, recognizing and investigating the firm's unorthodox practice. The second major exhibition involving Diller Scofidio + Renfro's work, Restless Architecture (which was also curated by the studio), opened at MAXXI in 2024.

== Selected projects ==
=== Architecture ===
- Brasserie, Seagram Building, New York, NY (2000)
- World Trade Center Viewing Platform, New York, NY (with Rockwell Group and Kevin Kennon; 2001)
- Institute of Contemporary Art, Boston, MA (2007)
- Lincoln Center (redesign and master plan, including various public spaces and expansions to the Alice Tully Hall, New York State Theater, Juilliard School, and School of American Ballet), New York, NY (2007–2011)
- Perry and Marty Granoff Center for the Creative Arts, Brown University, Providence, RI (2011)
- Cooper Hewitt, Smithsonian Design Museum (entrance, renovation), New York, NY (2014)
- The Broad, Los Angeles, CA (2015)
- McMurtry Building, Stanford University, Palo Alto, CA (2015)
- Berkeley Art Museum and Pacific Film Archive (expansion), Berkeley, CA (2016)
- Roy and Diana Vagelos Education Center (2016).104 Haven Avenue, New York.
- Museum of Image & Sound, Rio de Janeiro, Brazil (in construction)
- Zaryadye Park, Moscow, Russia (2017)
- High Line, New York, NY, (with James Corner; 2009–2019)
- 15 Hudson Yards, New York, NY (2019)
- The Shed, New York, NY (2019)
- Museum of Modern Art (expansion), New York, NY (with Gensler; 2019)
- United States Olympic & Paralympic Museum, Colorado Springs, CO (2020)
- Tianjin Juilliard School, Tianjin, China (2021)
- V&A East Storehouse, London, England (estimated completion, 2025)
- The Broad (expansion), Los Angeles, CA (estimated completion, 2028)

=== Installation ===
- Traffic, Columbus Circle, New York, NY (1981)
- Memory Theatre, Brooklyn Bridge, Brooklyn, NY (1986)
- Para-Site, Museum of Modern Art, New York, NY (1989)
- Tourisms:suitCase Studies, Walker Art Center, Minneapolis, MN and List Visual Arts Center, Cambridge, MA (1991)
- Soft Sell, Times Square, New York, NY (1993) (now in the collection of the San Francisco Museum of Modern Art)
- Bad Press: Dissident Housework Series, San Francisco Museum of Modern Art, San Francisco, CA (1993–1998)
- American Lawn, Canadian Centre for Architecture, Montreal, Canada (1998)
- Master/Slave, Fondation Cartier, Paris, France (1999)
- Travelogues, John F. Kennedy International Airport, New York, NY (2001)
- Facsimile, Moscone Convention Center, San Francisco, CA (2004; dismantled 2014)
- Who's Your DADA?, Museum of Modern Art, New York, NY (2006)
- Light Sock, commissioned by Swarovski (2007)
- Chain City, Venice Biennale of Architecture, Venice, Italy (2011)
- Arbores Laetae, Liverpool Biennial, Liverpool, UK (2008)
- Exit, Fondation Cartier, Paris, France (2009) (also presented at the United Nations Conference on Climate Change (COP15) in Copenhagen)
- Open House, in collaboration with Droog, Levittown, NY (2011)
- In Plain Sight, Venice Biennale of Architecture, Venice, Italy (2018)

=== Exhibition design ===
- How Wine Became Modern, San Francisco Museum of Modern Art, San Francisco, CA (2011)
- The Art of Scent: 1889–2010, Museum of Arts and Design, New York, NY (2012–2013)
- Heavenly Bodies: Fashion and the Catholic Imagination (displays), Metropolitan Museum of Art, New York, NY
- Cartier and Islamic Art: In Search of Modernity, Musée des Arts Décoratifs, Paris, France (2021)
- The Hare with Amber Eyes, Jewish Museum, New York, NY (2021)

=== Performance design ===
- The American Mysteries for Creation (1983)
- Jet Lag, performed internationally (with The Builders Association, 1998)
- Traveling Music, Bordeaux, France (2009)
- Be Your Self, in collaboration with Garry Stewart and Australian Dance Theatre, Adelaide, Australia (2010)

== Publications ==
Books written or edited by Diller Scofidio + Renfro include Flesh: architectural probes (1994); Back to the Front: Tourisms of War (1996); Blur: the Making of Nothing (2002); and Lincoln Center Inside Out: An Architectural Account (2012), which chronicles the firm's decade of work on the redesign of New York City's Lincoln Center.

Diller Scofidio + Renfro is the subject of Scanning: The Aberrant Architectures of Diller + Scofidio, published by the Whitney Museum of American Art in tandem with their 2003 exhibition and including essays by Aaron Betsky, K. Michael Hays, and Laurie Anderson; the monograph Diller + Scofidio (+Renfro): The Ciliary Function by Guido Incerti, Daria Ricchi and Deane Simpson; and Diller Scofidio + Renfro: Architecture After Images by Edward Dimendberg. A new retrospective monograph of the studio's work will be published by Phaidon Press in 2025.

== Documentaries ==
- Diller Scofidio + Renfro, Reimagining Lincoln Center and the High Line (dir. Muffie Dunn and Tom Piper, 2012, 54 minutes)
