= Iwona Buczkowska =

French architect and urban planner

- Born: 1953; Sopot
- Alma mater: École Spéciale d'Architecture; Gdańsk University of Technology
- Occupation: Architect, urban planner
- Awards: Jane Drew Prize (2024)
- Website: atelieriwonabuczkowska.fr

Iwona Buczkowska (born 1953) is a Polish-born French architect and urban planner. She designed the Cité Les Longs Sillons, where she also lives and works.

== Life and career ==
Buczkowska studied at the Polytechnic School in Gdańsk and the École Spéciale d'Architecture in Paris, from which she graduated in 1974 with a degree in architecture. She has been inspired by the theories of French architect and urban planner Jean Renaudie, as well as the way that towns were planned in the Middle Ages, the Renaissance and the Baroque period. Buczkowska is opposed to the segregation imposed by urban zoning and to the functional urban layout proposed by the Athens Charter. She was innovative in her use of wood as a building material and advocates the use of free plan construction which facilitates movement through the building.

== Awards and recognition ==
Buczkowska received the Gold Medal and Special Prize at the Fifth World Biennale of Architecture at Sofia in 1989 for her project at Le Blanc-Mesnil, and the silver medal and the Prix Delarue in 1994 from the Académie d'architecture for her collected work. In 2003, she received the Prix grand public de l’Architecture from the region Ile-de-France for her work at Le Blanc-Mesnil. Buczkowska was awarded the 2024 Jane Drew Prize for being "a pioneer of timber construction and a fierce defender of the right to good housing".

== Publications ==
- Skapska, Hanna (2020). Iwona Buczkowska: l'architecte face à la pérennité de son oeuvre. Paris: Editions L'Harmattan. p. 218. ISBN 978-2343190440.
- Buczkowska, Iwona; Vitta, Maurizio (1999). Iwona Buczkowska: Breathing Spaces. Milan: L'Arca Edizioni. p. 100. ISBN 978-8878380479.
