= Jane Drew Prize =

Architecture award

- Awarded for: Contribution to the status of women in architecture
- Sponsored by: Architects' Journal and The Architectural Review
- Country: United Kingdom

Dame Jane Drew DBE FRIBA
- Jane Drew in 1984

The Jane Drew Prize is an architecture award given annually by the Architects' Journal to a person showing innovation, diversity and inclusiveness in architecture. It is named after the English modernist architect Jane Drew.

== Background ==
The Jane Drew Prize began with discussions in 1997 between the Royal Institute of British Architects (RIBA) Women Architects Group and the Arts Council of England. The new prize was launched in January 1998 with a ceremony held at the Institute of Contemporary Arts in London. The award was created to recognise promotion of innovation, diversity and inclusiveness in architecture. It was named after the English architect Dame Jane Drew (died 1996) who, among other achievements, had tried to set up the first all-women architecture practice and had been the first female full Professor at Harvard University and Massachusetts Institute of Technology. Nominations were invited by the RIBA, after which a jury selected the winner who received a prize of £10,000. The 1998 winner also received a sculpture by Eduardo Paolozzi.

Problems were encountered with the initial award, primarily in finding suitable candidates that met all three criteria. A forum was held on 19 May 1998 where the four shortlisted candidates (client Jane Priestman, artist Martin Richman, landscape architect Kathryn Gustafson and architectural practice Fashion Architecture Taste) were asked to give a ten-minute presentation. The evening was described as "tedious" and Gustafson didn't even turn up. The award was finally presented to Gustafson on 4 June after strong disagreements and near-resignations amongst the judging panel.

The prize has subsequently become part of the W Awards (previously the Women in Architecture Awards), a programme held by The Architectural Review and Architects' Journal. According to the 2013 entry guidelines, the prize recognises a "contribution to the status of women in architecture".

== Winners ==
- 2024 – Iwona Buczkowska, French architect and urban planner, "a pioneer of timber construction and a fierce defender of the right to good housing".
- 2023 – Kazuyo Sejima, Japanese architect, "for her contribution to raising the profile of women in architecture."
- 2022 – Farshid Moussavi, Iranian-born British architect, "for elevating the profile of women in architecture."
- 2021 – Kate Macintosh, Scottish architect, "selected in celebration of her work in public architecture and advocation for the use of buildings as a tool for social justice since the 1960s."
- 2020 – Yasmeen Lari, Pakistani architect, "for her contribution to raising the profile of women in architecture and design."
- 2019 – Elizabeth Diller, American architect and co-founder of the firm Diller Scofidio + Renfro, "From her wide range of work – including the High Line in New York, to The Broad art museum in Los Angeles, to the much-anticipated London Centre for Music – Diller's brave, refreshing, innovative and often cross-disciplinary approach is an inspiration to the architectural profession."
- 2018 – Amanda Levete, British architect and principal of the firm AL_A, "Amanda Levete is an architect whose career has been notable at several points, but whose independent practice has blossomed internationally, and whose independent voice has generated welcome debate and reform."
- 2017 – Denise Scott Brown, American architect, planner, writer, educator, and principal of the firm Venturi, Scott Brown and Associates, "Denise Scott Brown's wonderful architectural writing and thinking, her work and her wit has been an inspiring force for change. This honour squares the circle."
- 2016 – Odile Decq, French architect, Co-founder of Studio Odile Decq, for being "a creative powerhouse, spirited breaker of rules and advocate of equality."
- 2015 – Yvonne Farrell and Shelley McNamara, Irish architects and founders of Grafton Architects, for "not being afraid to speak in a language that is feminine yet produce buildings which are robust and full of conviction."
- 2014 – Kathryn Findlay (1953–2014), Scottish architect, for "her outstanding contribution to the status of women in architecture."
- 2013 – Eva Jiřičná, Czech architect and designer, for "her outstanding contribution to the status of women in architecture."
- 2012 – Zaha Hadid (1950–2016), Iraqi architect, for "her outstanding contribution to the status of women in architecture." She was described as having "broken the glass ceiling more than anyone", for example being the first woman to win the Pritzker Prize.
- 1998 – Kathryn Gustafson, American landscape architect, for her body of work which "straddled the boundary between individual artistic sensibility and teamwork."
