= McMurtry Building =

Stanford University building

Coordinates: 37.432282°N 122.171908°W

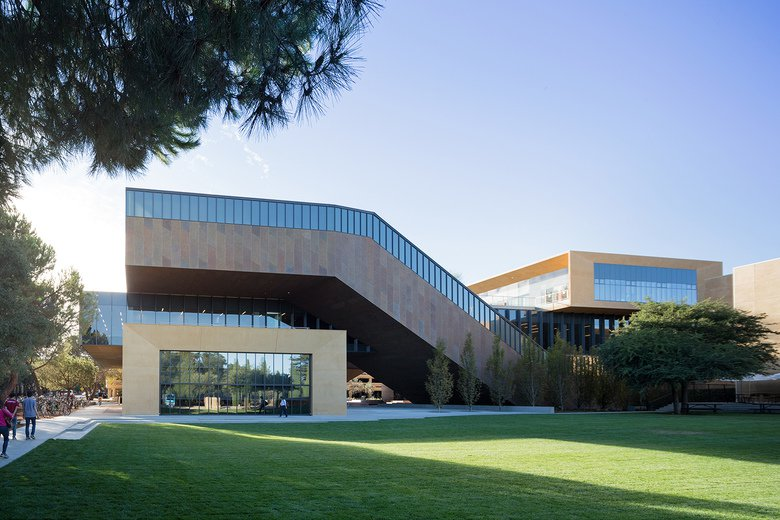
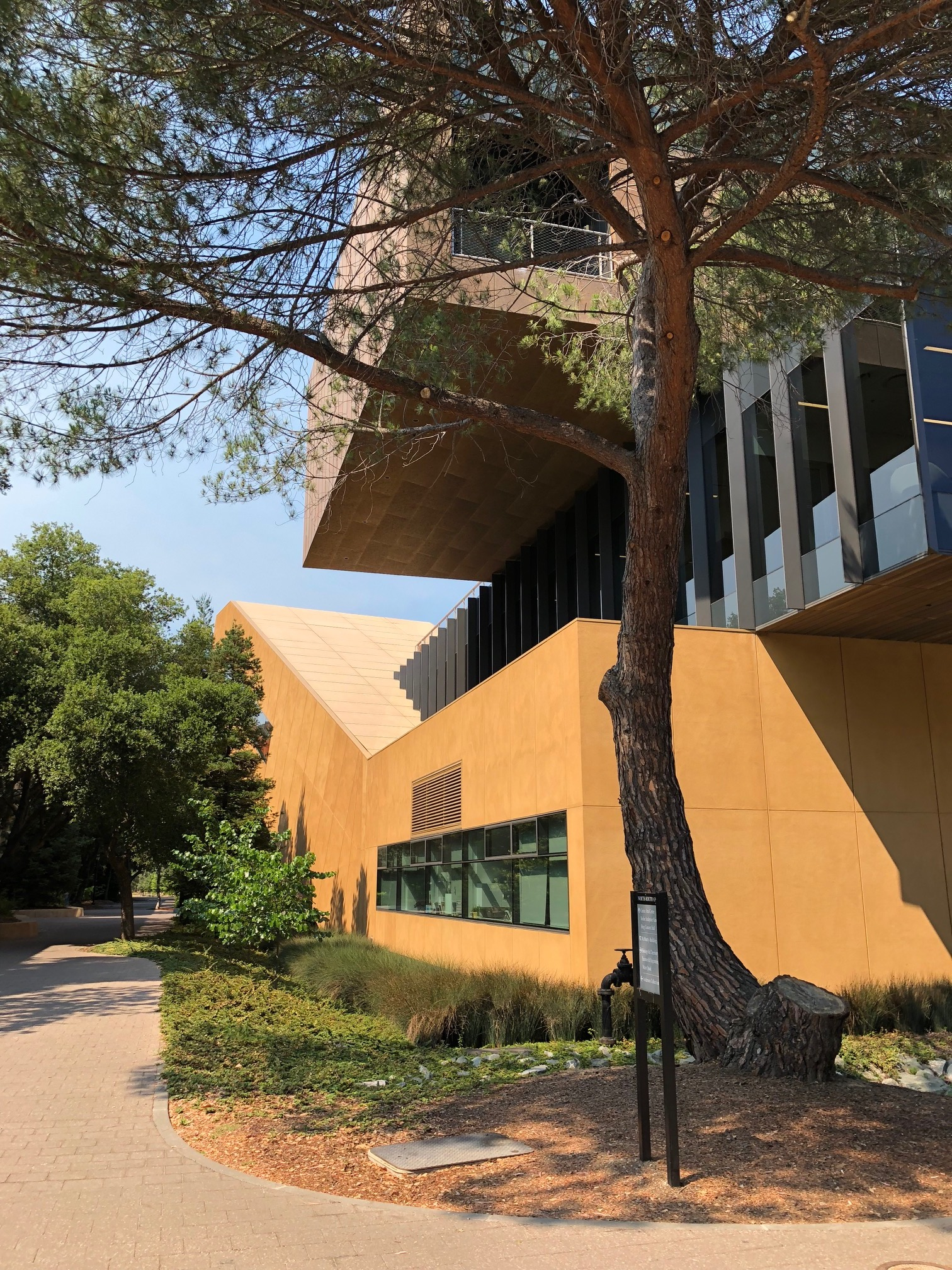
McMurtry Building, 2018

The McMurtry Building opened in 2015, and houses Stanford University's Department of Art and Art History at 355 Roth Way in Stanford, California.

== History ==
The McMurtry Building replaced the Nathan Cummings Art Building (1968–2015) at Stanford University, a low-slung, reinforced concrete building designed by John Carl Warnecke.

The project cost an estimated $87 million. To start the project, Stanford received $30 million from donors Burt McMurtry, former chair of the Board of Trustees, and his wife Deedee McMurtry, after whom the building was named. Other donors and University funds contributed the rest of the cost.

The building houses art classrooms, art studios, screening rooms, the art and architecture library, a student lounge, a cafe, gallery space and faculty offices in 100,000 square feet of space.

The building's design uses open space, emphasizes natural light and has classrooms with views. The two main strands of the department, art and art history, forms two literal "strands" of classrooms winding around a central library.

The McMurtry Building was designed by Diller Scofidio + Renfro, one of the world's leading architects and designer of New York's Highline Park.
