= Elizabeth Diller =

American architect

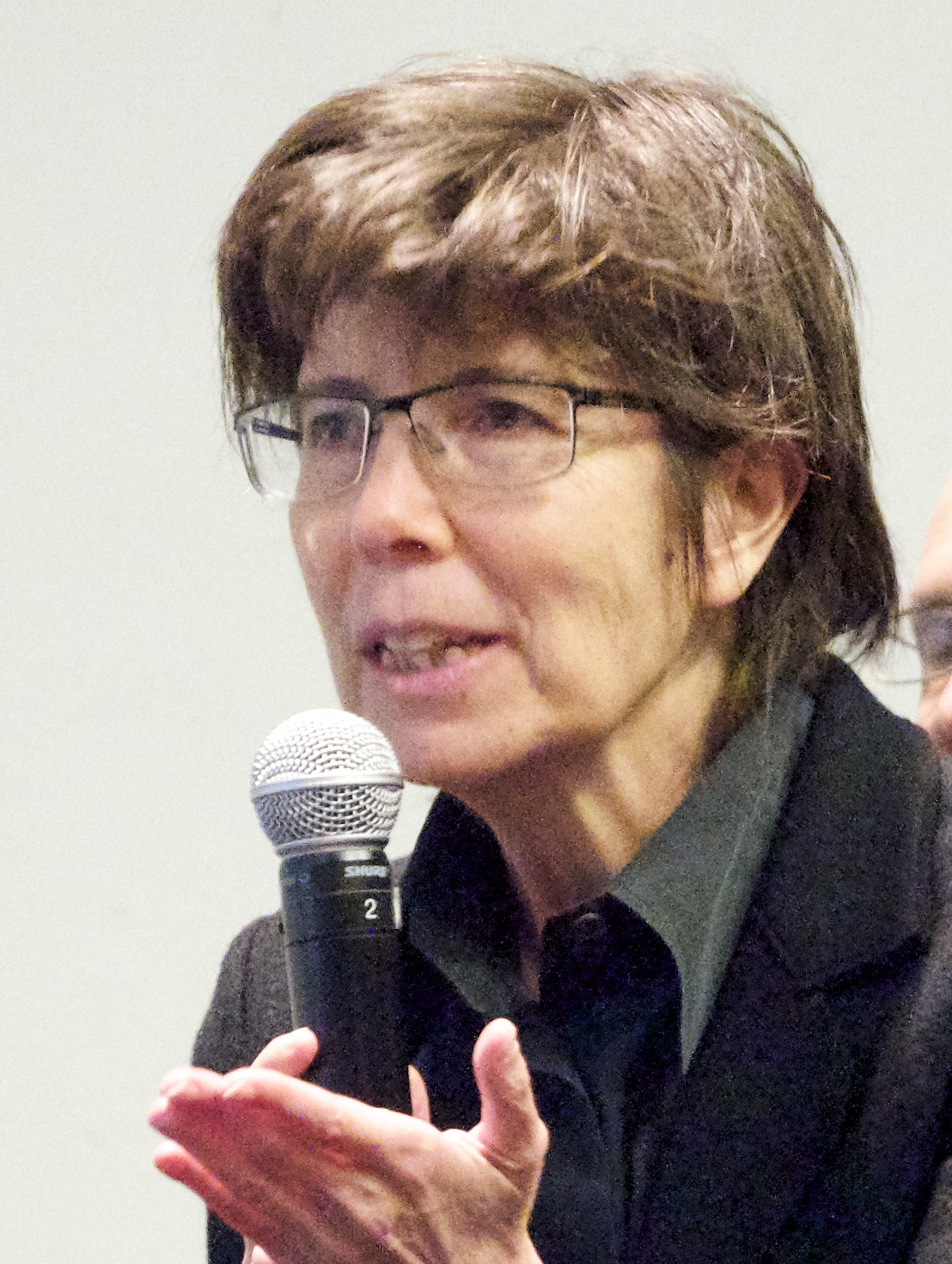
Elizabeth Diller photographed at Columbia GSAPP, 2013

Elizabeth Diller, also known as Liz Diller, is an American architect and partner in Diller Scofidio + Renfro, which she co-founded in 1981. She is also an architecture professor at Princeton University.

== Life ==
Elizabeth Diller was born in 1954 in Łódź, Poland, to Jewish parents. The family emigrated to the United States when she was six years old.

Diller earned her B.Arch in 1979 from the Cooper Union School of Architecture. She met Ricardo Scofidio during her studies; he was her teacher and then her tutor. After earning her degree and working as an assistant professor, they later married in the 1980s. Since the 2000s, she has become well-known for her work with conceptual architecture, museums and other cultural institutions.

== Awards and honors ==
Diller is considered among the most influential designers of cultural spaces and in 1999 she and Scofidio received the first MacArthur Foundation fellowship in architecture. In 2002, they designed the Blur Building for the Swiss Expo with this money.

In 2000, Diller Scofidio was awarded the James Beard Award for Outstanding Restaurant Design.

Diller Scofidio + Renfro was awarded WSJ. magazine's 2017 Architecture Innovator of the Year Award. It also received the Smithsonian Institution National Design Award.

In 2018, she was named to the Time magazine most-influential list for the second time, and was the only architect on that list.

In 2019, Diller became the winner of the Jane Drew Prize, and the eighth winner of the annual Women in Architecture Award. She was also awarded the Second Royal Academy Architecture Prize.

In 2022, she was awarded the Wolf Prize in Arts in the category "Architecture".

Her husband, college professorial coworker, and architecture partner Ricardo Scofidio died in March 2025.

== Works ==
- According to Architectural Digest, Elizabeth Diller and Ricardo Scofidio, since 2002, have created many projects including the Blur in Switzerland; the Institute of Contemporary Art, Boston; the High Line on the west side of Manhattan; a series of renovations to New York City's Museum of Modern Art; The Shed in New York City's Hudson Yards; a series of renovations to Lincoln Center; a film museum in Berkeley, California; buildings at Brown University and Stanford University; and the Broad Museum in Los Angeles.
- They have been continuously working on several projects: Vagelos Center at Columbia Medical School; a new business-school building for Columbia University; the London Centre for Music at the Barbican; and a cinema museum in Rio de Janeiro.
- She has written books including: Lincoln Center Inside Out: An Architectural Account in 2012, and has been interviewed in other works such as Bodybuilding: Architecture and Performance in 2019.
