= Ricardo Scofidio =

American architect (1935–2025)

- Born: 16 April 1935; New York City, New York, United States
- Died: 6 March 2025 (aged 89)
- Education: Columbia University (BA)
- Spouse(s): Allana Deserio (m. 1955; div. 1979) Elizabeth Diller (m. 1982)
- Children: Ian, Gino, Marco, and Dana
- Parent(s): Earle Scofidio; June Matthews

Ricardo Merrill Scofidio (April 16, 1935 – March 6, 2025) was an American architect. With his wife Elizabeth Diller, he founded interdisciplinary design studio Diller Scofidio + Renfro.

== Early life and education ==
Scofidio was born in New York City on April 16, 1935, to Earle and June (Matthews) Scofidio. His father, a jazz musician who played alto saxophone and clarinet, was Black. His mother, though light-skinned, was of mixed Black heritage. He had a brother, Basilio.

He attended the Cooper Union School of Architecture and then Columbia University, where he received a bachelor’s degree in 1960. He began teaching at the Cooper Union in 1965.

== Career ==
In 1979, Scofidio and Diller opened their architecture firm. In 1999, they completed a 100 unit block of apartments in Gifu, Japan. Among Scofidio's most well-known projects was the High Line, a collaboration with architects James Corner and Piet Oudolf. It has become one of New York's signature destinations since its opening in 2009. A 2019 renovation of the Museum of Modern Art building, and a $1 billion restoration of Lincoln Center for the Performing Arts. The firm designed a new business school building for Columbia University's Manhattanville campus, and the Roy and Diana Vagelos Education Center for Columbia's medical school, as well as The Broad museum in Los Angeles.

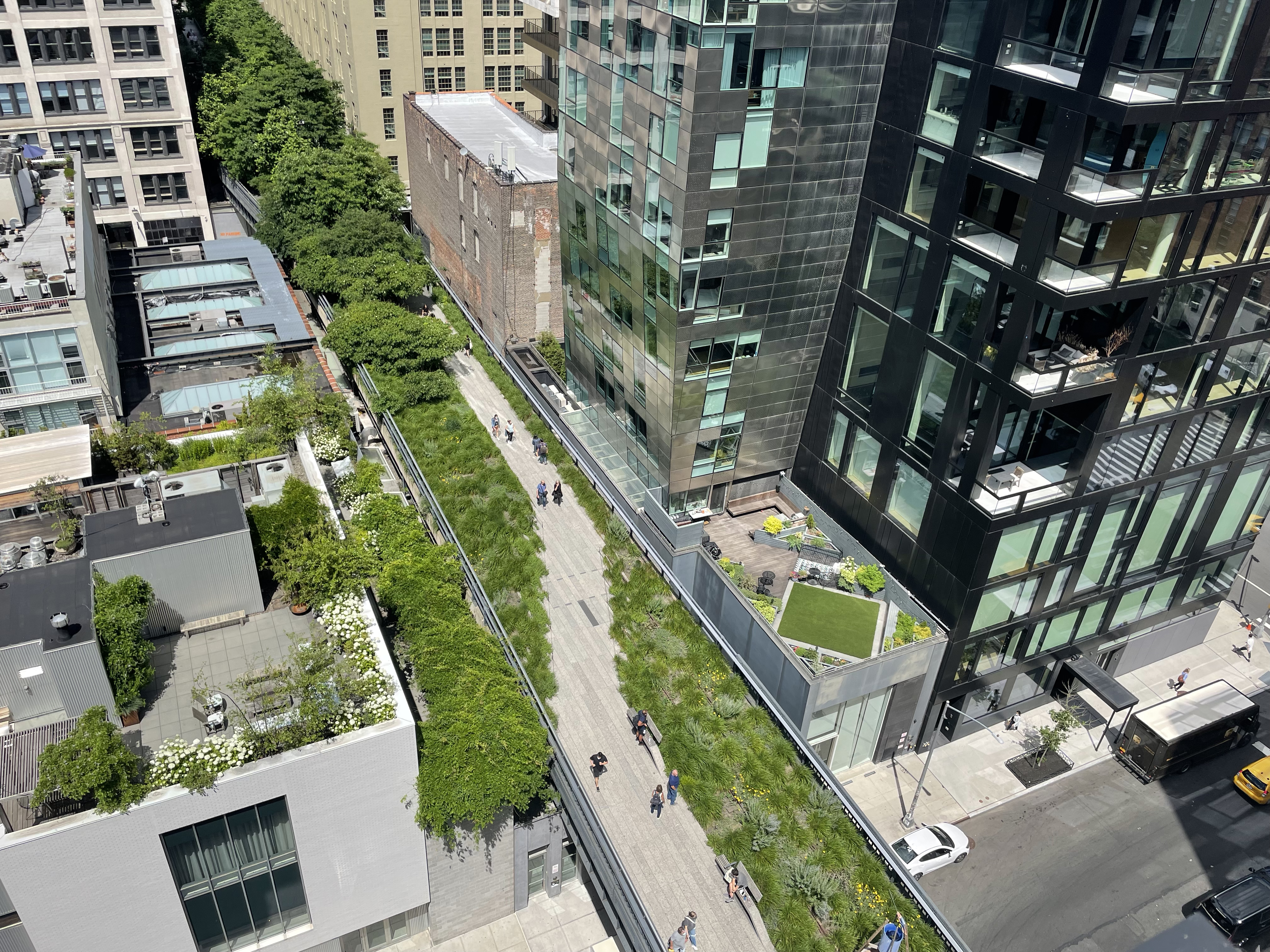
The High Line, Scofidio's most well-known project

== Personal life and death ==
In 1955, Scofidio married Allana Jeanne Deserio, with whom he had four children. They divorced in 1979. He married Elizabeth Diller in 1989. Scofidio lived in Manhattan. He died on March 6, 2025, at the age of 89. In addition to his sons Ian, Gino, Marco, and Dana, he was survived by six grandchildren; and three great-grandchildren.

== Awards and honors ==
In 2019, Scofidio and Diller won the Royal Academy architecture prize. In 1999, along with his wife Elizabeth Diller, he became one of the first architects to win a MacArthur Genius grant.
