= Montandon =

- Commune
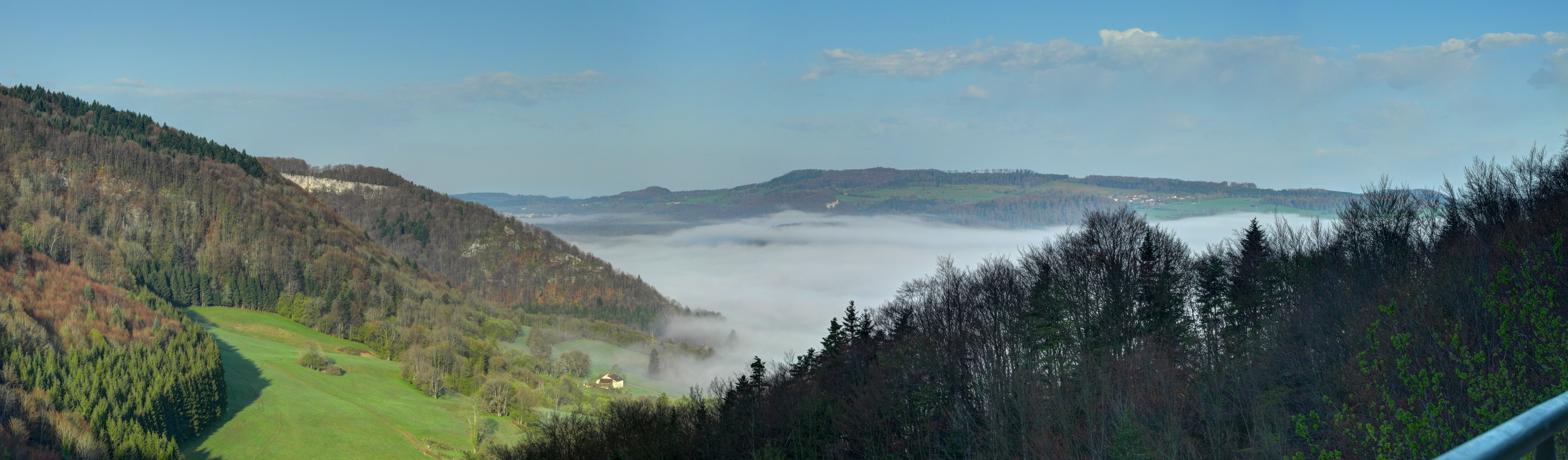
- Location of Montandon
- Location within France Location within Bourgogne-Franche-Comté
- Coordinates: 47°18′17″N 6°50′26″E
- Country: France
- Region: Bourgogne-Franche-Comté
- Department: Doubs
- Arrondissement: Montbéliard
- Canton: Maîche

Government
  - Mayor (2020–2026): Patrick Bessot
- Area^{1}: 12.71 km^{2} (4.91 sq mi)
- Highest elevation: 880 m (2,890 ft)
- Lowest elevation: 520 m (1,710 ft)
- Population (2023): 371
  - Density: 29.2/km^{2} (75.6/sq mi)
- Time zone: UTC+01:00 (CET)
  - Summer (DST): UTC+02:00 (CEST)
- INSEE/Postal code: 25387 /25190
- ^{1} French Land Register data, which excludes lakes, ponds, glaciers > 1 km^{2} (0.386 sq mi or 247 acres) and river estuaries.

Montandon (French pronunciation: [mɔ̃tɑ̃dɔ̃]) is a commune in the Doubs department in the Bourgogne-Franche-Comté region in eastern France.

== Geography ==
By road, the commune is 8.8 km (5.5 mi) southeast of Saint-Hippolyte.

== Population ==
Historical population
Year	Pop.	±% p.a.
1968	289	—
1975	261	−1.45%
1982	299	+1.96%
1990	341	+1.66%
1999	322	−0.63%
2007	313	−0.35%
2012	394	+4.71%
2017	405	+0.55%
2023	371	−1.45%
Source: INSEE

== See also ==
- Communes of the Doubs department
