= Expo.02 =

Expo.02 was the 6th Swiss national exposition, which was held from 15 May to 20 October 2002. The exposition took place around the lakes of Neuchâtel, Bienne/Biel and Morat/Murten. It was divided into five sites, which were called Arteplages, due to the proximity of the water (some sites were actually partially or totally built on the water). The five arteplages were located in Neuchâtel, Yverdon-les-Bains, Morat/Murten, Biel/Bienne and on a mobile barge traveling from one site to another. The barge represented the canton of Jura, which does not have access to any one of the three lakes.

Expo.02 was the subject of controversy in Switzerland due to the many financial problems it encountered. It was first scheduled to take place in 2001 (under the name of Expo.01), but the catastrophic organization and lack of funding threatened to put an end to the project, which was saved at the last minute by the Swiss Federal Government, which put in a large amount of public money to save the exhibition. Expo.02 cost 1.6 billion Swiss francs. Most of it came from major Swiss companies which sponsored the different exhibitions on the Arteplages.

According to the organisers, more than 10 million admissions were counted, and the exhibition succeeded in achieving its sole and only goal: the public's pleasure.

Each arteplage was dedicated to a different theme. There was "Nature and Artifice" in Neuchâtel, "I and the Universe" in Yverdon-les-Bains, "Instants and Eternity" in Murten/Morat, "Power and Freedom" in Biel/Bienne and "Sense and Movement" on the mobile platform.

== Images ==
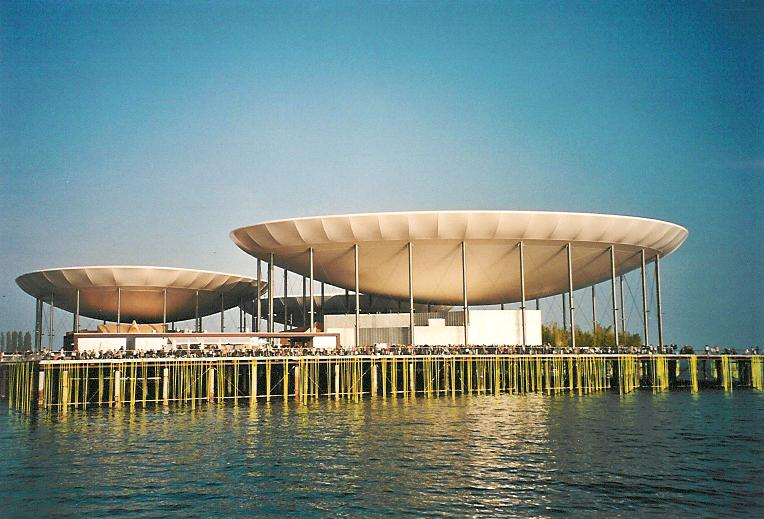
Neuchâtel

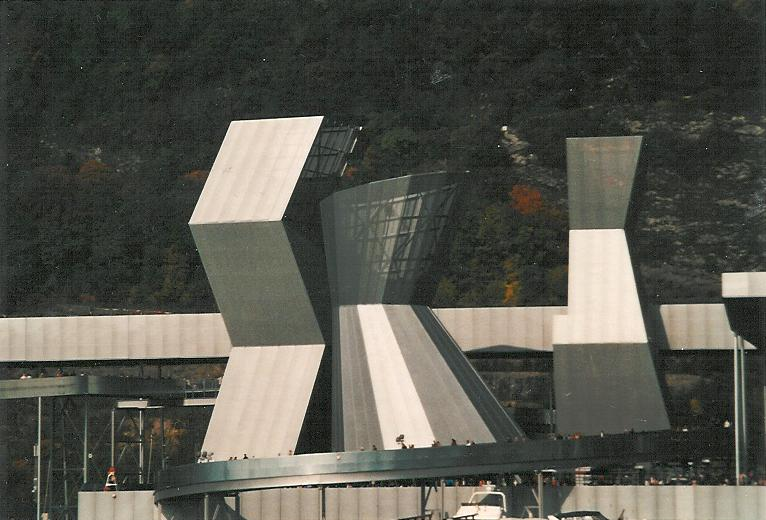
The towers in Bienne

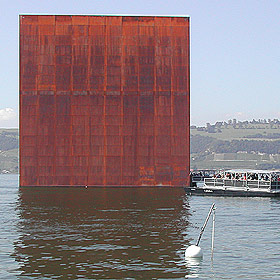
The monolith of Jean Nouvel in Morat
