= 15 Hudson Yards =

Residential skyscraper in Manhattan, New York

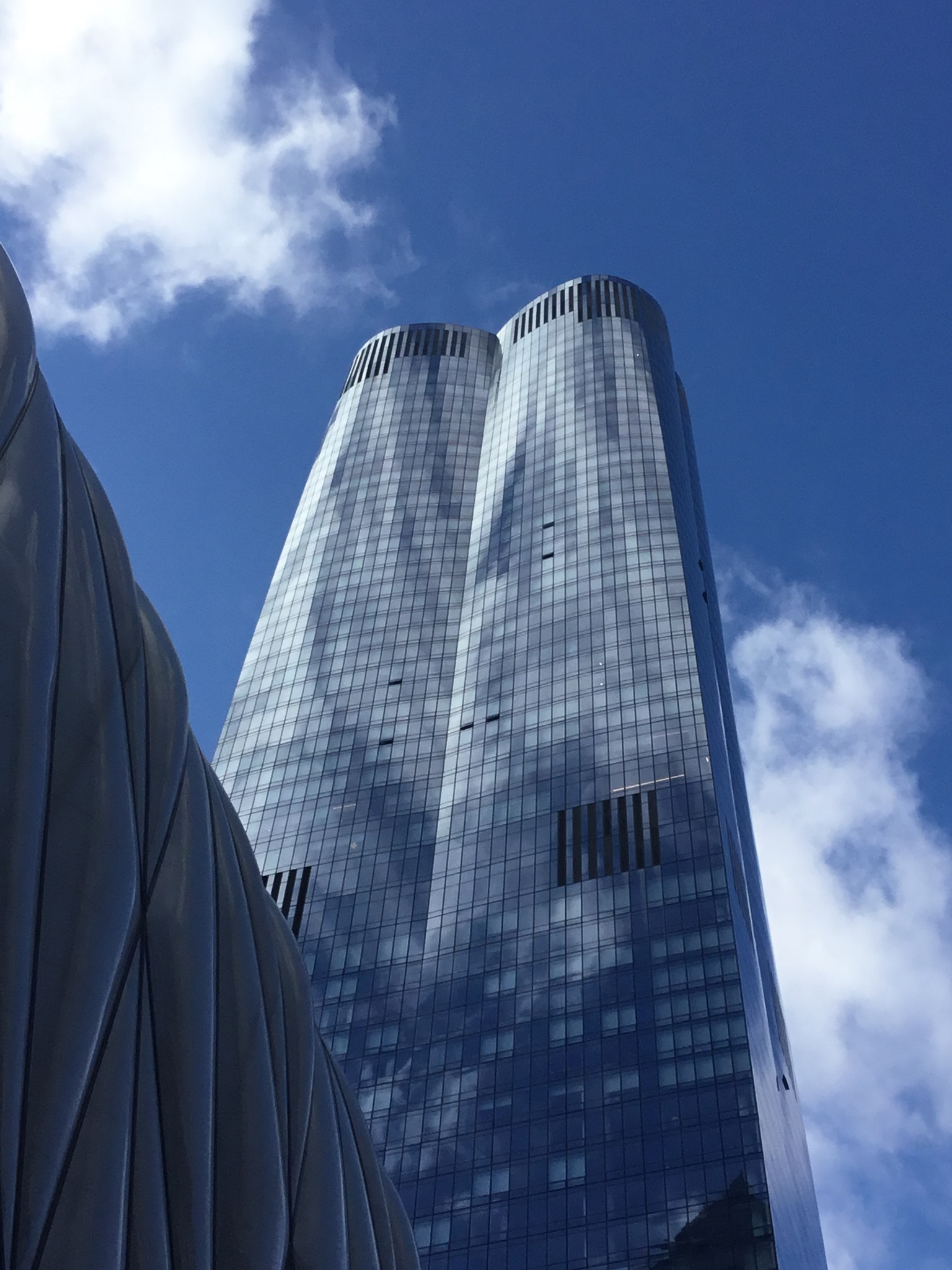
- 15 Hudson Yards
- Alternative names: Tower D

General information
- Status: Completed
- Type: Residential
- Location: 30th Street & Eleventh Avenue; Manhattan, New York City
- Coordinates: 40.7535°N 74.0032°W
- Groundbreaking: December 4, 2014
- Completed: March 15, 2019
- Operator: The Related Companies L.P. Oxford Properties Group Inc.

Height
- Roof: 917 feet (280 m)

Technical details
- Floor count: 88
- Floor area: 799,995 ft^{2} (74,322.0 m^{2})

Design and construction
- Architects: Kohn Pedersen Fox (master planner); Diller Scofidio + Renfro (lead architect); Rockwell Group (lead interior architect)
- Engineer: Jaros, Baum & Bolles (MEP)
- Structural engineer: WSP

15 Hudson Yards (originally known as Tower D) is a residential skyscraper on Manhattan's West Side, completed in 2019. Located in Chelsea near Hell's Kitchen Penn Station area, the building is a part of the Hudson Yards project, a plan to redevelop the Metropolitan Transportation Authority's West Side Yards.

== History ==
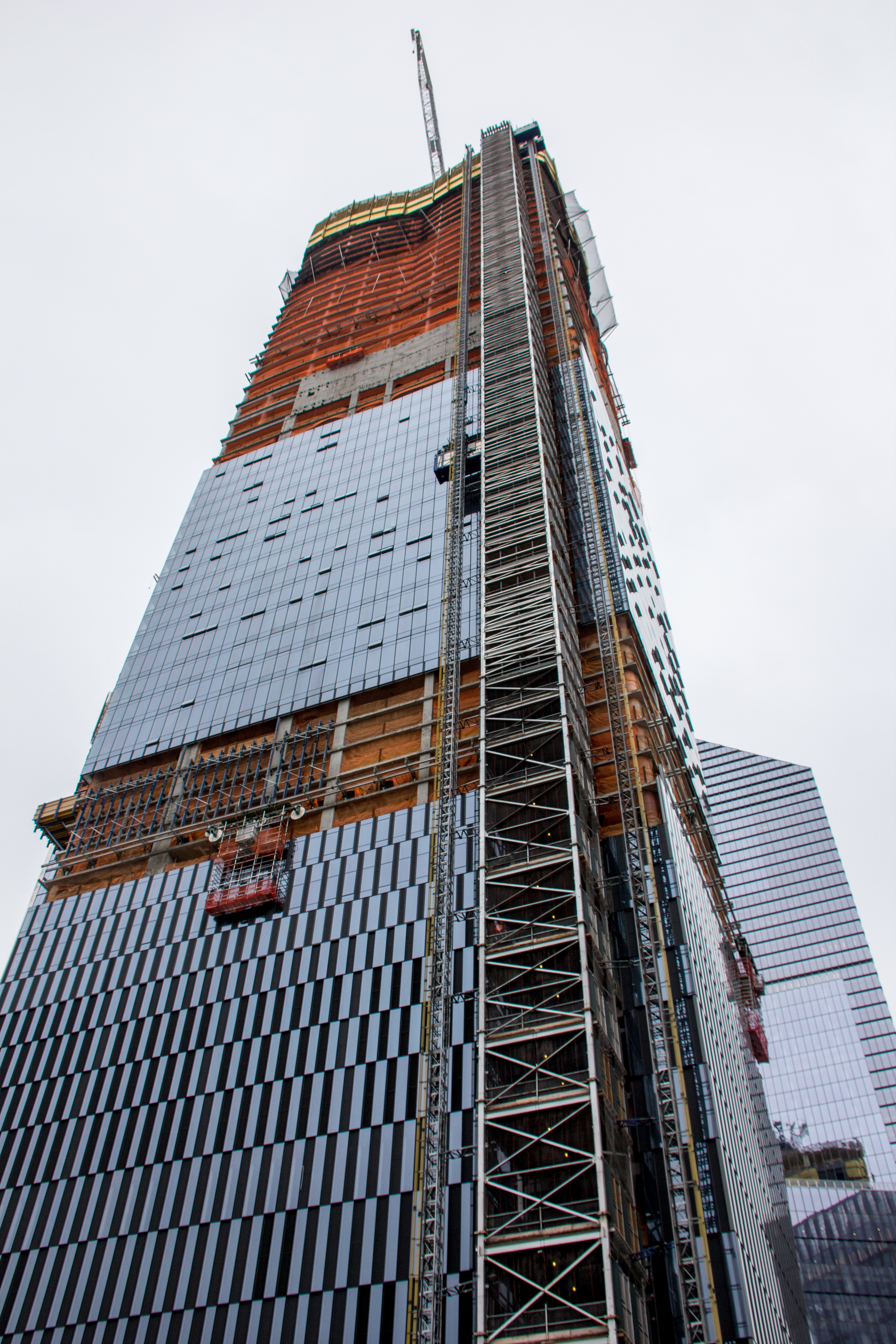
Under construction in 2017

15 Hudson Yards started construction on December 4, 2014. In September 2015, the project received $850 million in construction financing from UK hedge fund The Children's Investment Fund Management. Additional funding came from the New York State Housing Finance Agency due to the building's affordable housing component. The tower was topped out in February 2018 and opened on March 15, 2019. By January 2019, approximately 60% of the building's units had been sold.

In 2021, prospective low-income tenants of the building filed a lawsuit against Related. The suit alleges the company created a different address (553 West 30th Street) for 15 Hudson Yards' affordable units and that the tenants of those units would not have access to the same amenities as those in the market-rate units. The suit alleges the building does not have an actual "poor door" but does still segregate its tenants through a "poor address" and "poor floors". "Poor doors" were banned in 2015 by New York City mayor Bill de Blasio.

== Architecture and design ==
15 Hudson Yards is designed by Diller Scofidio + Renfro, Lead Architect and Rockwell Group, Lead Interior Architect and features straps along the middle and top part of the building to make it more "fluid-like". Ismael Leyva Architects, P.C. served as the Executive Architect. WSP was the lead structural engineer; Jaros, Baum & Bolles was the MEP engineer; while RWDI and Langan provided environmental and geotechnical engineering services.

The building includes 285 residential units. The 50th and 51st floor are a 40,000 square feet (3,700 m^{2}) amenity space containing an aquatics center with a 75-foot-long swimming pool, spa, fitness center, yoga studio, children’s playroom, private dining suites, screening room, golf club lounge, wine storage, and business center. The building also features the "Skytop", an open-air terrace on top of the building that is marketed as the highest outdoor residential roof deck in New York City.

The tower is integrated with The Shed, a cultural venue at the tower's base. Opened on April 5, 2019, The Shed hosts activities in a wide range of cultural areas including art, performance, film, design, food, fashion, and new combinations of cultural content. The building's lobby contains a large-scale wooden installation designed by American sculptor Joel Shapiro.

Map of buildings and structures at Hudson Yards. Zoom the map and click on points for more details.

== Notable residents ==
Residents who have purchased units include Philip I. Kent, the former CEO of Turner Broadcasting System.

== See also ==
- List of tallest buildings in New York City
- Hudson Yards Redevelopment Project
