= Hudson Place =

Hudson Place may refer to:

- Hudson Place (Manhattan), a street in the Hudson Yards Redevelopment Project
- Hudson Place (Hoboken), a short street near Hoboken Terminal
