= Jaros, Baum & Bolles =

American engineering consulting firm

Jaros, Baum & Bolles Consulting Engineers, LLP
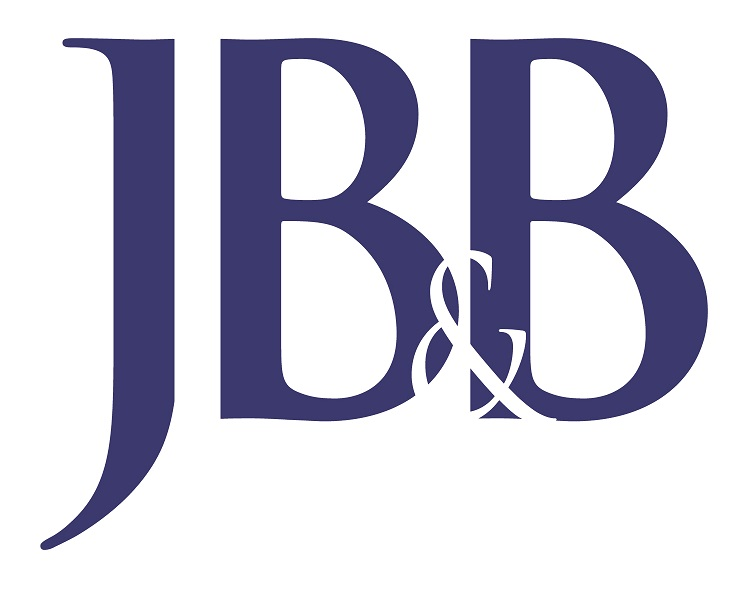

Practice information
- Firm type: Engineering Consulting
- Partners: Mark R. Torre (Managing Partner); Scott E. Frank (Managing Partner); Walter J. Mehl, Jr. (Managing Partner); Brendan P. Weiden; Christopher J. Prochner; Richard M. McFadden; Anthony M. Montalto; Brian T. Towers; John P. Koch
- Founders: Alfred Jaros; Albert Baum
- Founded: 1915
- Location: New York City (Headquarters); Boston; Philadelphia

Significant works and honors
- Buildings: One World Trade Center; Sears Tower; Bank of China Tower (Hong Kong)

Website
- www.jbb.com

Jaros, Baum & Bolles Consulting Engineers, LLP (JB&B) is an American MEP (Mechanical, electrical, and plumbing) and consulting engineering firm founded in 1915 by Alfred L. Jaros, Jr. and Albert L. Baum. The firm is best known for high-rise projects, including One World Trade Center and Hudson Yards in New York City, the Willis Tower (formerly Sears Tower) in Chicago, and the Bank of China Tower in Hong Kong. In 2020, JB&B was named New York's Design Firm of the Year by Engineering-News Record magazine.

== History ==
In 1915, mechanical engineers Alfred L. Jaros, Jr. and Albert L. Baum, recent graduates of Columbia University's engineering program, left their internships with a large consulting firm and founded Jaros and Baum. In 1932, Frederick Bolles joined them, bringing plumbing design to the firm. The company's longevity has allowed it to claim a number of engineering firsts, including what is believed to be the first sprinkler system for a high-rise building (Willis Tower, opened as the Sears Tower in 1974) and the first high-speed elevators (original World Trade Center in New York City, opened 1973). In February 2022, the firm created the Deep Carbon Reduction Group, which helps building owners and operators navigate new policies and regulations for reducing carbon emissions in urban settings.

JB&B’s work at 555 Greenwich Street in New York City includes a Nordic-inspired geothermal heating and cooling system that will use 40% less energy than an average large office building in the city. Completed in 2023, the 16-story office tower’s HVAC system employs geothermal wells, dedicated outdoor air system (DOAS) units, radiant heating and cooling, and a control system that ties it together. Heat from underground travels through water in pipes to the roof, where additional air source heat pumps extract heat from the air. The system can also run in the opposite direction to provide cooling. Designed and built in conjunction with COOKFOX Architects and AECOM Tishman for Hines Interests Limited Partnership and Hudson Square Properties, the project is intended to meet New York City’s Local Law 97 of 2019, passed as a part of the Climate Mobilization Act by the New York City Council in March 2019. The tower is fully electrified with no fossil fuel use on site for any purpose. Even though it uses electricity to heat the building, it will use 40% less electricity than comparable commercial properties.

== Selected projects ==
- 111 West 57th Street, New York, NY
- 35 Hudson Yards, New York, NY
- Bank of America Tower (Manhattan), New York, NY
- Bank of China Tower, Hong Kong
- Memorial Hospital, New York, NY
- Moynihan Train Hall, New York, NY
- NASCAR Hall of Fame, Charlotte, NC
- National September 11 Memorial & Museum, New York, NY
- One Vanderbilt, New York, NY
- One World Trade Center, New York, NY
- Pan Am Building, New York, NY
- Seagram Building, New York, NY
- Sony Center, Berlin, Germany
- The Shops & Restaurants at Hudson Yards
- TWA Flight Center at JFK International Airport, New York, NY
- Whitney Museum of American Art, New York, NY
- Willis Tower, Chicago, IL
- World Trade Center (1973-2001), New York, NY

== Notable alumni ==
- Donald E. Ross, former managing partner, member of the National Academy of Engineering; Mitchel W. Simpler, PE, former managing partner and former board chair for the American Council of Engineering Companies (ACEC); Anthony M. Arbore, PE LEED, former partner and MEP team lead for Bank of China Tower (Hong Kong). Augustine "Augie" DiGiacomo (1945-2015), a former managing partner for JB&B, was acknowledged in The World by Design: The Story of a Global Architecture Firm for his close ties and creative contribution as a consultant to the book's subject, Kohn Pederson Fox.
