= Donald E. Ross =

American engineer (1930–2021)

Donald E. Ross (May 2, 1930 – January 18, 2021) was an American engineer who served as managing partner of the engineering firm Jaros, Baum & Bolles.

== Biography ==
Ross received his B.A. from Columbia College in 1952 and B.S. from the Columbia School of Engineering and Applied Science in 1953. He also earned an MBA from New York University. As managing partner of Jaros, Baum & Bolles, he led the design of mechanical and electrical systems for more than 200 skyscrapers, including Willis Tower, Bank of China Tower, and the Messeturm.

Ross was elected a member of the National Academy of Engineering in 1993 "for contributions to design of energy-efficient systems, professional and public services, and the nurturing of engineering talent." He received the Egleston Medal from Columbia School of Engineering and Applied Science in 2019 for "distinguished engineering achievement."
