= 35 Hudson Yards =

Residential skyscraper in Manhattan, New York

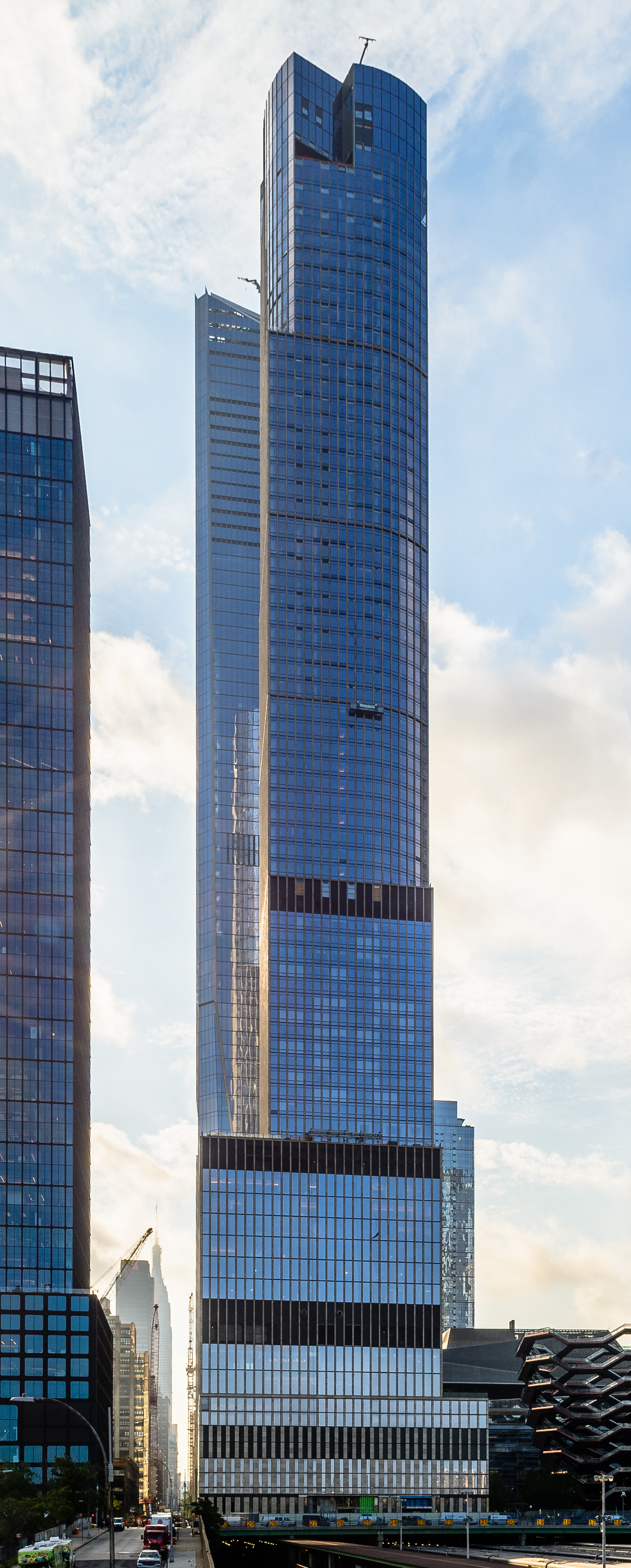
- 35 Hudson Yards
- Alternative names: Tower E532-560 West 33rd Street (legal address)

General information
- Status: Completed
- Type: Mixed use
- Architectural style: Postmodern
- Location: 33rd Street and Eleventh Avenue; Manhattan, New York, U.S.
- Coordinates: 40.75455°N 74.00240°W
- Opened: March 15, 2019
- Operator: Related Companies; Oxford Properties

Height
- Roof: 1,000 feet (300 m)

Technical details
- Floor count: 72
- Floor area: 1,130,000 square feet (105,000 m^{2})

Design and construction
- Architects: Skidmore, Owings and Merrill; Kohn Pedersen Fox Associates (master planner)
- Engineer: Jaros, Baum & Bolles (MEP), Langan (Geotechnical)
- Structural engineer: Skidmore, Owings and Merrill
- Main contractor: AECOM Tishman Construction

Map of buildings and structures at Hudson Yards. Zoom the map and click on points for more details.

35 Hudson Yards (also Tower E) is a mixed-use skyscraper in Manhattan's West Side composed of apartment units and a hotel. Located near Hell's Kitchen, Chelsea, and the Penn Station area, the building is a part of the Hudson Yards project, a plan to redevelop the Metropolitan Transportation Authority's West Side Yards. As of November 2022, it was the 28th-tallest building in the United States.

== History ==
The project was presented to the public for the first time in summer 2011. The tower is a part of the Hudson Yards Redevelopment Project, and is located at 11th Avenue and West 33rd Street. The building design was changed from a cylindrical to a rectangular prismatic shape in December 2013.

The construction of 35 Hudson Yards began in 2015 and was completed in 2019. A building permit application was filed in January 2015. In July 2016, the project received $1.2 billion in construction financing from UK hedge fund The Children's Investment Fund Management. 35 Hudson Yards topped out in June 2018.

The building opened on March 15, 2019. The hotel opened in June. Bloomberg reported in August 2022 that Related was considering a sale of the hotel.

The Wall Street Journal reported in July 2023 that as many as 50% of the condos in 35 Hudson Yards remained unsold. In 2025, Related began seeking a buyer for Equinox's hotel and gym, as well as about 180,000 square feet (17,000 m^{2}) of office space. In November 2025, Mori Trust paid $540 million for a 38-story portion of the building, including the Equinox hotel.

== Architecture ==
The building was designed by David Childs of the architectural firm Skidmore, Owings & Merrill, which also provided structural engineering services. Jaros, Baum & Bolles was the MEP engineer, and Langan was the geotechnical engineer. Tishman Construction, a wholly owned subsidiary of AECOM, was general contractor.

Originally featured as a 900-foot (270 m) tower with setbacks at various intervals, the building was redesigned in early December 2013 to feature a cylindrical "tube." The redesign increased the height of the tower to approximately 1,000 feet (300 m). Interiors were designed by Ingrao with Eucalyptus cabinetry and Quartzite countertops.

The tower was designed as a residential and a hotel tower. 35 Hudson Yards contains 11 floors dedicated to hotel space along with a sky lobby, a ballroom and a spa. A plaza is located at the foot of the tower and the tower also contains medical offices.

The first floor serves as the building's lobby. The lobby contains Flowers, a tapestry by Swedish artist Helena Hernmarck. Retail is on levels 2, 4, and 5 and will consist of an outpost of the Hospital for Special Surgery focused on physical therapy and a SoulCycle. Six floors of office space starts from level 8 that serve as the new headquarters for Related's subsidiary Equinox Fitness. The hotel, also managed by Equinox, has 212 rooms (including 48 suites) across levels 24 through 38. Levels 3, 6, and 7 are home to a 60,000 square feet (5,600 m^{2}) gym and spa also operated by Equinox. The upper 36 floors contain 135 condominiums. Building amenities include a gym, yoga studio, meditation room, a lounge, and a golf-simulator. In August 2019, a new restaurant, Electric Lemon, opened on the 24th floor.

== See also ==
- List of tallest buildings in New York City
- Hudson Yards Redevelopment Project
