= 601 West 29th Street =

Under-construction skyscraper in Manhattan, New York

3Eleven
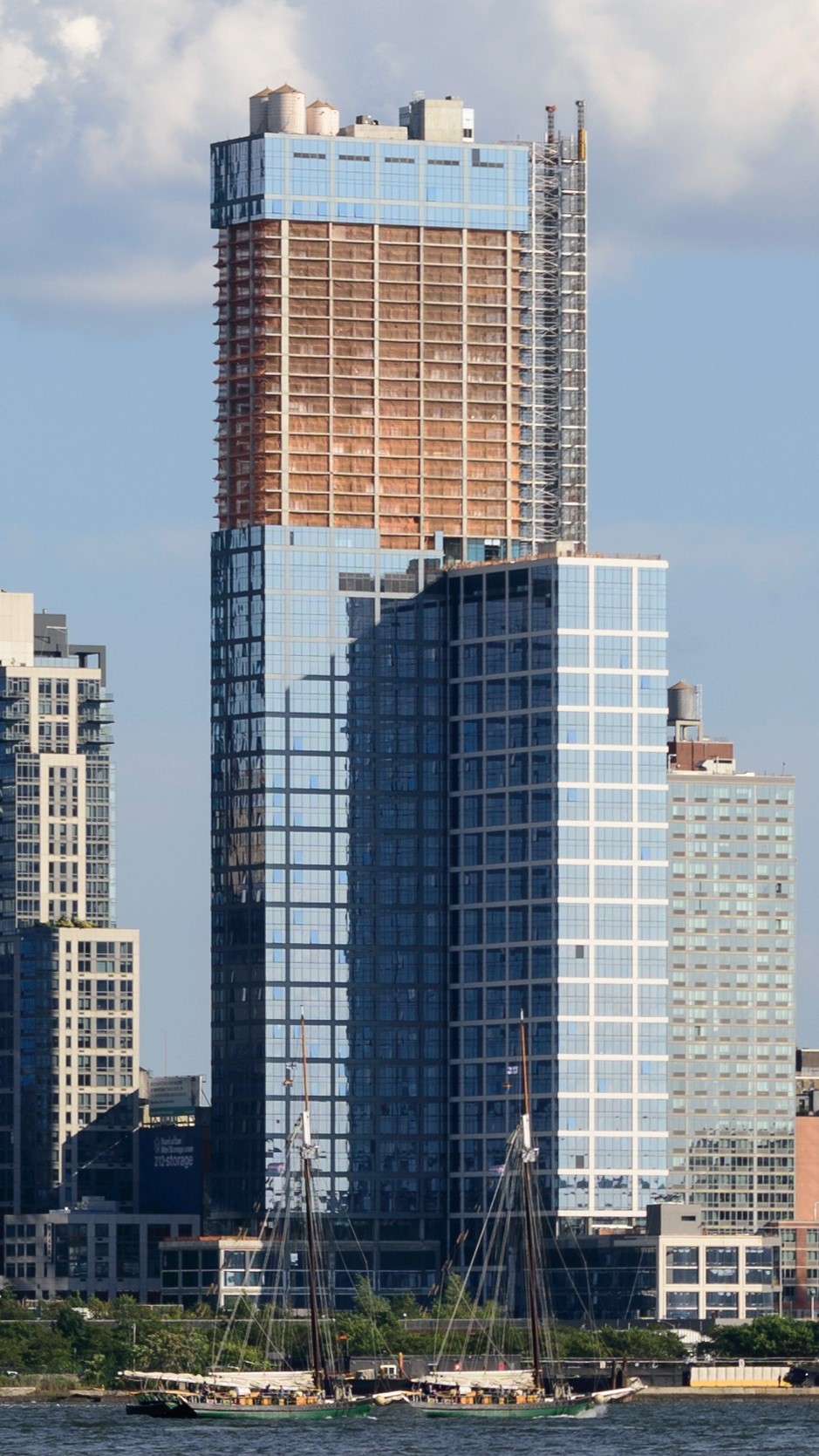
- Seen under construction in September 2021
- Interactive map of the 3Eleven area
- Alternative names: Block 675 Tower A, 601 West 29th Street

General information
- Status: Completed
- Classification: Residential
- Location: 601 West 29th Street; Manhattan, New York City
- Coordinates: 40.753048°N 74.004440°W
- Construction started: 2019
- Estimated completion: 2022

Height
- Height: 637 feet (194 m)

Technical details
- Floor count: 59

Design and construction
- Architect: FXCollaborative
- Developer: Douglaston Development

601 West 29th Street is a building in Chelsea, Manhattan, New York City developed by Douglaston and designed by the architectural firm FXCollaborative. The building is built on infill and will be adjacent to the High Line and the Hudson Yards development. Douglaston purchased 120,000 square feet (11,000 m^{2}) of air rights from the nearby Chelsea Piers to construct the building, and is coordinating with Lalezarian as 601 West 29th neighbors their construction site at 606 West 30th Street.

== History ==
The site formerly held a studio used by the artist Jeff Koons. Douglaston acquired the site through a 99-year ground lease for $129.6 million.

In June 2019, Ares Management invested $160 million in equity in the project. At the same time, the development raised $415 million in construction debt from a consortium of banks led by HSBC including Bank of China, Helaba, Banco Santander, and Raymond James Financial. Excavation for the building's foundations began in September 2019.

== Design ==
The building is roughly 700 feet (210 m) tall, and has 931 units, including 234 affordable apartments. Amenities include a fitness center, outdoor terraces, a pool, private cabanas, a pet daycare, and 198 subterranean parking spaces. Additionally, the ground floor contains 15,000 square feet (1,400 m^{2}) of retail space.
