= 606 West 30th Street =

Skyscraper in Manhattan, New York

Coordinates: 40.753482°N 74.004791°W

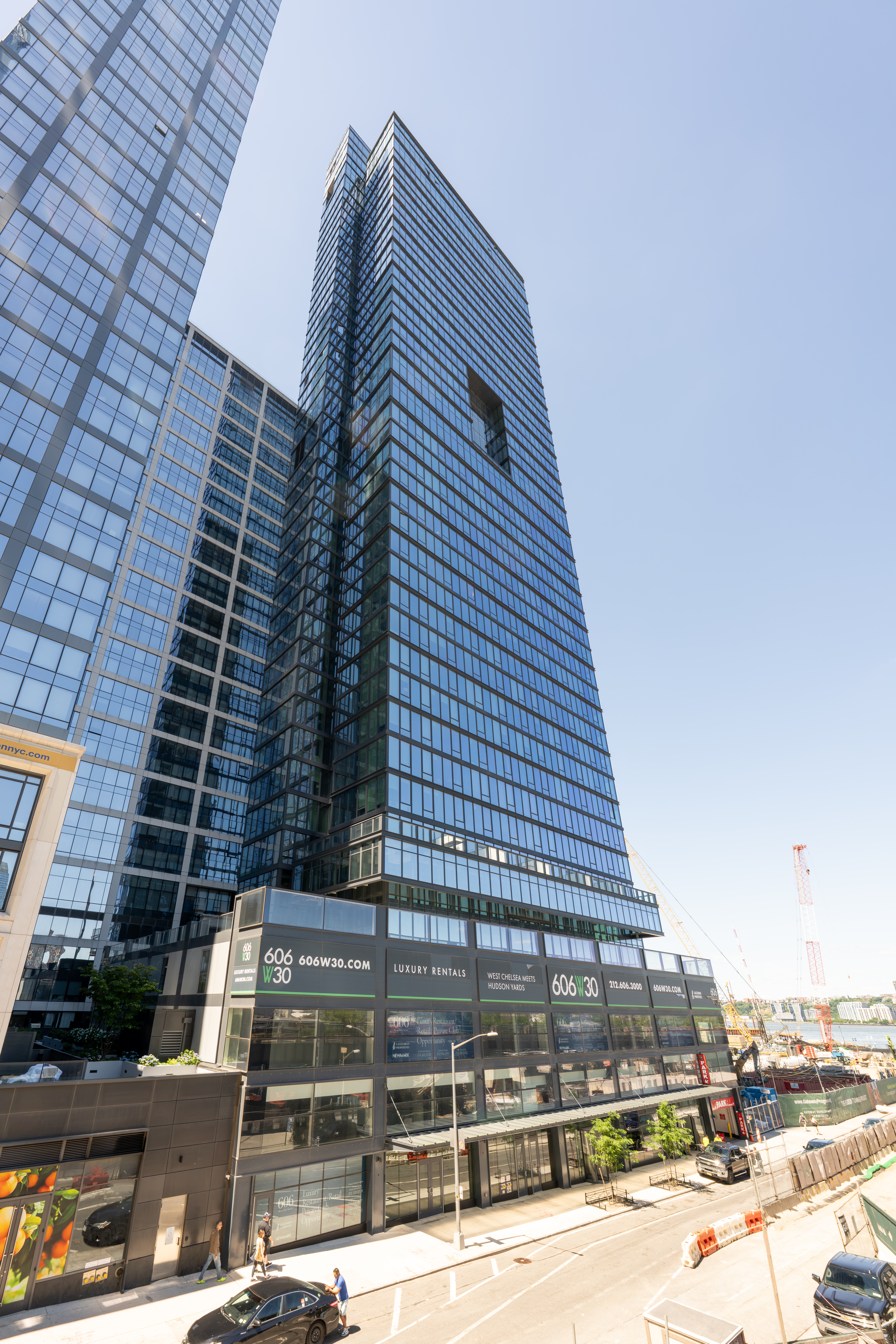
- Interactive map of the 606 West 30th Street area

General information
- Status: Completed
- Location: 606 West 30th Street, New York City, United States
- Construction started: 2019
- Completed: 2022

Height
- Height: 545 feet (166 m)

Technical details
- Floor count: 42

Design and construction
- Architect: Ismael Levya

606 West 30th Street is a building in Hudson Yards, Manhattan, New York City designed by architect Ismael Levya. Lalezarian is developing the building in coordination with Douglaston Development, which is constructing a neighboring building at 601 West 29th Street. Lalezarian purchased the development site for $36 million in 2015. 606 will sit on infill that was once the Hudson River. Andrew Nelson, writing for real estate website New York YIMBY, has said of the design that: "...the outdated reference and limited formal experimentation do not inspire fascination".

The building will be adjacent to the High Line park and the Hudson Yards development.
