= Philip I. Kent =

American media executive

Philip I. Kent is an American media executive. He was the chief executive officer of Turner Broadcasting System Inc., from March 2003 to December 2013.

Kent was responsible for TBS, TNT, Cartoon Network, Turner Classic Movies, Turner South, Boomerang, TNT Latin America, Cartoon Network Latin America, TCM & Cartoon Network in Europe, TCM & Cartoon Network in Asia Pacific, Cartoon Network Japan, CNN News Group, which includes CNN/U.S., CNN Headline News, CNN International, CNNfn, CNN Radio, CNN Newsource, CNN Airport Network and CNN.com.

Kent had overall responsibility for all news and entertainment advertising and distribution, as well as for all corporate administrative functions, Turner Sports, the Atlanta Braves and Turner Field.

He began his career in 1975 at Blair Television.

== Positions held ==
- President of Turner Broadcasting System International
- President and chief operating officer of CNN America Inc. and Cable News Network LP LLP.
- Packaging agent in television department at Creative Artists Agency (CAA).
- In 1984, he was promoted to vice president of program development of John Blair & Co.
- From August 2000 to August 2001, he served as president and chief operating officer of CNN News Group
  - oversaw a strategic reorganization of the news business; initiated a sweeping redesign of CNN Headline News; construction and implementation of a new Manhattan street-side broadcast studio; instrumental in high-profile hires including Lou Dobbs, Aaron Brown and Paula Zahn.
- Chairman emeritus of The Advertising Council, Inc.
- Vice chairman of The Advertising Council, Inc.
- Director of National Cable & Telecommunications Association, the Metro Atlanta Chamber of Commerce, Atlanta's Woodruff Arts Center and the Atlanta Braves.

Education: Earned a BA in economics from Lehigh University.
