= Monica Rich Kosann =

American photographer

Monica Rich Kosann is a fine art black-and-white photographer, who is also the founder of the Monica Rich Kosann a, jewelry, home decor and accessory company. Her company produces several different collections: jewelry, image cases, frames and evening bags.

== Photography ==
Kosann is noted for her photography of children and family portraits. Her photography is featured in two books by Sister Carol Ann Nawracaj, Treasures from Heaven, the Gift of Children (1997), and Thank Heaven For Little Girls (2001). Kosann's portraits have been published in magazines such as Parents and Child, and her work has been reviewed in The New York Times Home Section and Town & Country.

== Jewelry design ==
Kosann also specializes in ways to display photos. Kosann began designing photograph frames in 2002 by recycling antique compacts and cigarette cases. A cigarette case-shaped photograph holder designed by Kosann sells for up to $1450. Kathy Hilton gave photograph frames for her daughters Paris and Nicky for Christmas 2005. Kosann has designed image cases and jewelry for Madonna and Katie Holmes.

Each of her pieces is crafted from sterling silver, gold, calfskin leather or glass fired enamel. She launched her collection in 2003, and her pieces were inspired by vintage cigarette cases, powder compacts, lockets and daguerreotype cases that she collected from flea markets and antique shopping.

This collection has been featured editorially in numerous publications including W Jewelry, Departures, Newsweek, InStyle, Town & Country (magazine), People (magazine), In Touch, the Robb Report, ELLE, and LA Confidential. Monica and her work has been featured on CNBC, Martha Stewart, E! News and Entertainment Tonight.

Monica was awarded the Rising Star Award for fine jewelry by Fashion Group International in January, 2010.

== Personal life ==
Monica Rich Kosann was born in New York City. Kosann began studying photography at the age of 16 during a summer at the International Summer Academy of Fine Arts, in Salzburg, Austria. She then attended the International Center of Photography in New York, Rhode Island School of Design, École des Arts at the Sorbonne in Paris. She received a bachelor's degree from Clark University in Worcester, Massachusetts.

Kosann is married to husband Rod, and they have two daughters. Kosann befriended Nawracaj in 1995, when she went to the Villa Maria Education Center in Stamford, Connecticut to take pictures of students for Family Circle magazine.

== Published books ==
- Thank Heaven For Little Girls (Adams Media Corporation, 2001)
- The Fine Art of Family (MRK Fine Arts, 2004)
- Living What You Love (Clarkson Potter, a division of Random House, published April 20, 2010)
