= Hudson Yards (development) =

Development project in Manhattan, New York

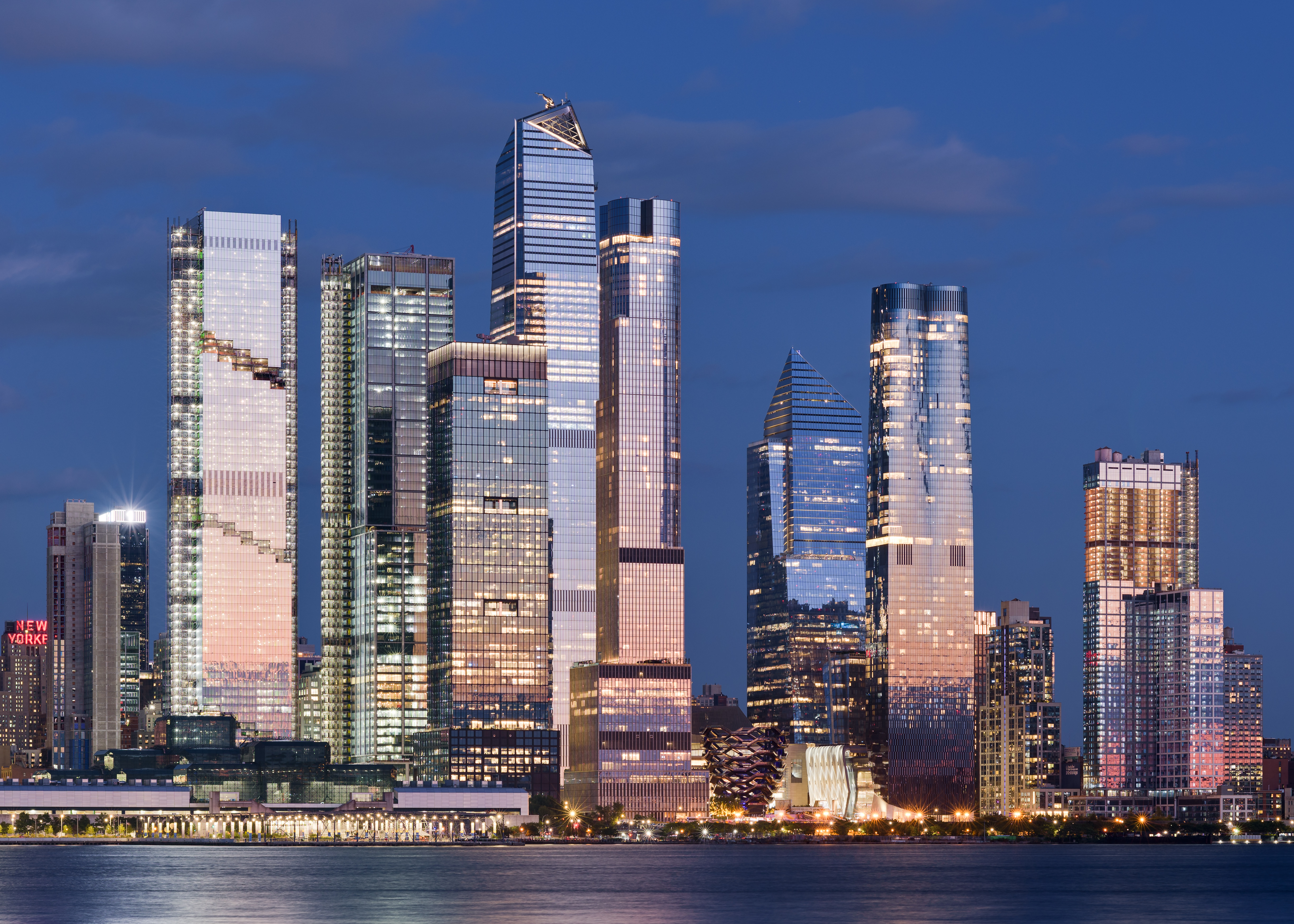
- Hudson Yards in September 2021
- Interactive map of Hudson Yards
- Location: Above West Side Yard, Manhattan, New York City
- Coordinates: 40°45′15″N 74°00′09″W
- Status: Under construction
- Groundbreaking: December 4, 2012; 13 years ago

Companies
- Architect: General site plan: Kohn Pedersen Fox, Thomas Heatherwick; 50 Hudson Yards only: Foster + Partners; 55 Hudson Yards only: Roche-Dinkeloo
- Developer: The Related Companies L.P. Oxford Properties Group Inc.

Technical details
- Cost: US$25 billion
- Buildings: 10, 15, 30, 35, 50, 55 Hudson Yards, and The Shed
- Size: 28 acres (11 ha)

Hudson Yards is a 28-acre (11 ha) real estate development in the Hudson Yards neighborhood in Manhattan, New York City, between the Chelsea and Hell's Kitchen neighborhoods. It is located on the waterfront of the Hudson River. Related Companies and Oxford Properties are the primary developers and major equity partners in the project. The architectural firm Kohn Pedersen Fox designed the master plan for the site, and the following architects contributed designs for individual structures: Skidmore, Owings, and Merrill, Thomas Heatherwick, Foster + Partners, Roche-Dinkeloo, and Diller Scofidio + Renfro. Major office tenants include Tapestry, BCG, Skydance Corporation, L'Oréal, Wells Fargo, and KKR.

Construction began in 2012 with the groundbreaking for 10 Hudson Yards, and the first phase opened on March 15, 2019. Agreements between various entities, including the local government, the Metropolitan Transportation Authority (MTA), and the state of New York, made the development possible. Upon completion, structures on the West Side of Midtown South would sit on a platform built over the West Side Yard, a storage yard for Long Island Rail Road trains (hence the development's name). The first of its two phases comprises a public green space and eight structures that contain residences, a hotel, office buildings, a mall, and a cultural facility. The special zoning for Hudson Yards (an area roughly bound by 30th Street in the south, 41st Street in the north, 11th Avenue in the west, and Eighth Avenue in the east) further incentivized the building of other large-scale projects. Hudson Yards is adjacent but unrelated to Manhattan West, 3 Hudson Boulevard, and The Spiral.

== Site and structures ==
Map of buildings and structures at Hudson Yards. Zoom the map and click on points for more details.

The eastern portion of the site, developed as Phase 1, is located between Tenth and Eleventh Avenues. It contains three office towers on Tenth Avenue, two of which have a retail podium between them. Phase 1 also includes The Shed performing arts center, a public plaza, the Vessel sculpture, and three residential skyscrapers on Eleventh Avenue. Developers plan to build Phase 2, the western portion of the development, above tracks between Eleventh and Twelfth Avenues. Phase 2 will provide additional office and residential space.

=== 10 Hudson Yards ===
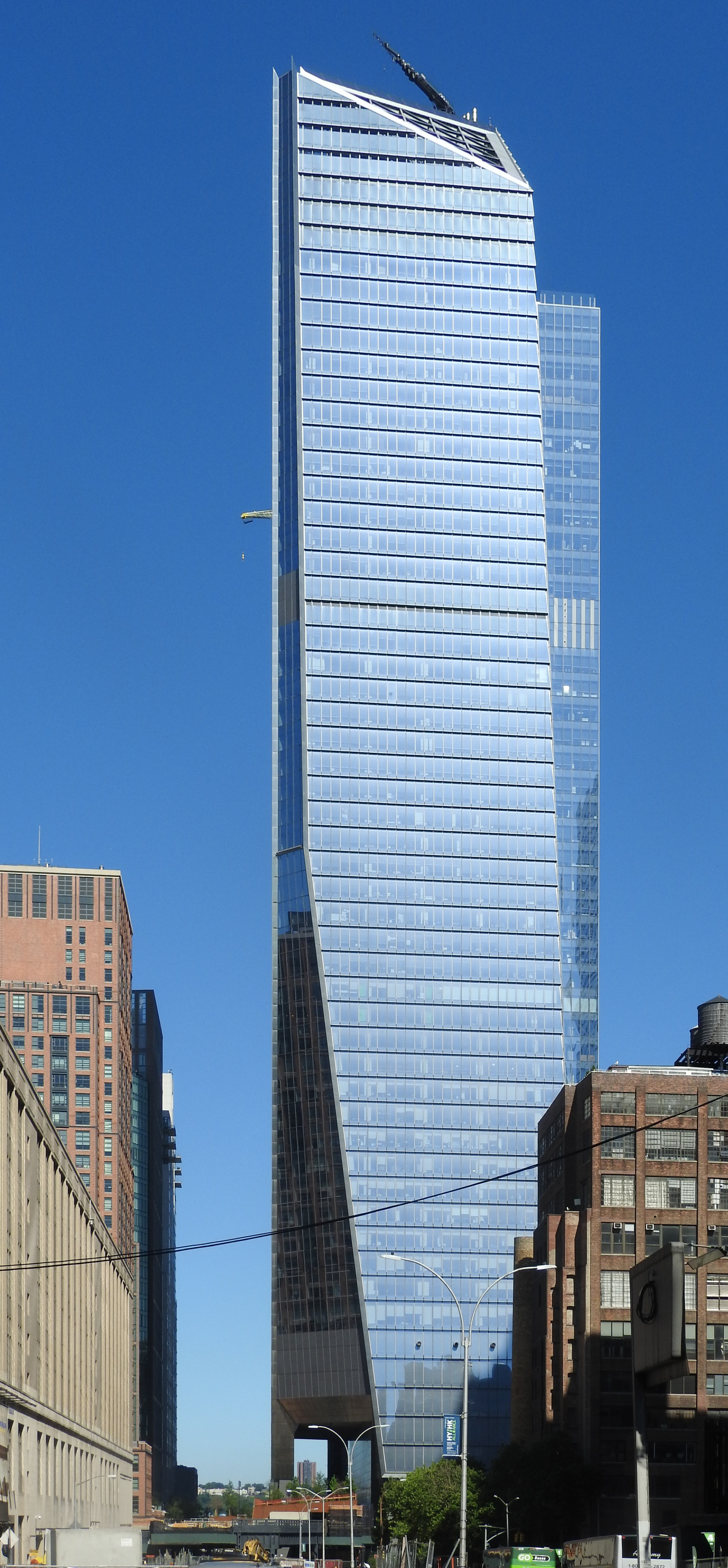
10 Hudson Yards

The 52-story, 895-foot (273 m) 10 Hudson Yards is located at Tenth Avenue and 30th Street, along the southeastern corner of Phase 1. It opened in 2016. Ground was broken for the building on December 4, 2012. Construction began with 10 Hudson Yards as it was not built over railroad tracks. However, 10 Hudson Yards does straddle the High Line spur to Tenth Avenue. 10 Hudson Yards opened on May 31, 2016, and was the first structure in the Hudson Yards development to be occupied by tenants. Companies with offices in the building include L'Oreal, Boston Consulting Group(BCG), Coach, SAP, Intercept Pharmaceuticals, VaynerMedia, and Sidewalk Labs. Early on during construction, Coach purchased a stake in the building, which was sold back to Related toward the end of construction. Kohn Pedersen Fox designed the building.

=== 15 Hudson Yards ===
15 Hudson Yards, originally proposed as Tower D, is located on Eleventh Avenue and West 30th Street, near Phase 1's southwestern corner. The building connects to a semi-permanent structure, a performance and arts space known as The Shed. 15 Hudson Yards started construction in December 2014, was topped out in February 2018, and opened in early 2019. When completed, 15 Hudson Yards included 285 residential units. Its original design, with a pronounced "corset" at the middle of the tower's height, attracted attention. 15 Hudson Yards is designed by Diller Scofidio + Renfro (Lead Architect) and Rockwell Group (Interior Architect).

=== The Shed ===
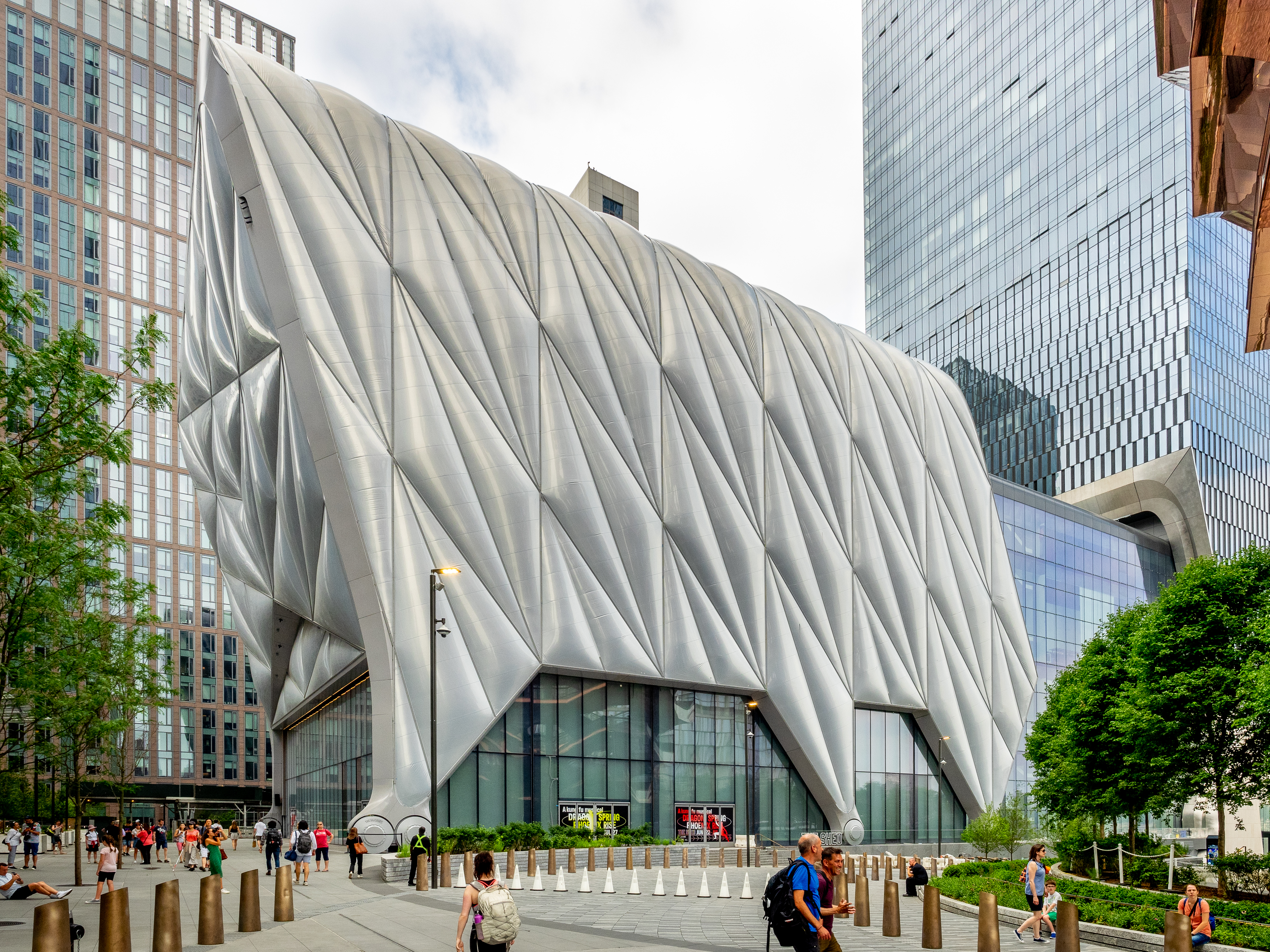
The Shed

The Shed is an arts center housed in the Bloomberg Building, a three-story structure adjacent to 15 Hudson Yards. The space is focused on providing cultural programming, and is maintained by an organization of the same name. Its most prominent feature is a retractable "shell" that wraps around its roof and its northern and southern facades. The Shed opened on April 5, 2019.

=== 30 Hudson Yards ===
The 103-story, 2.6-million-square-foot (240,000 m^{2}) 30 Hudson Yards is located at Tenth Avenue and 33rd Street. At 1,296 feet, it is the city's sixth-tallest building and home to the highest outdoor observation deck in New York City. Key tenants at 30 Hudson Yards include Kohlberg Kravis Roberts (KKR), Skydance Corporation and CNN, Wells Fargo, DNB Bank, Covington & Burling, and Susquehanna International Group (SIG).

Construction began after caissons were sunk to support the platform over the tracks, the latter of which was raised 12 to 27 feet (4 to 8 m) above ground level, at the same elevation as the High Line. 30 Hudson Yards opened on March 15, 2019. Edge observation deck on the building's 100th floor opened in March 2020.

=== 35 Hudson Yards ===
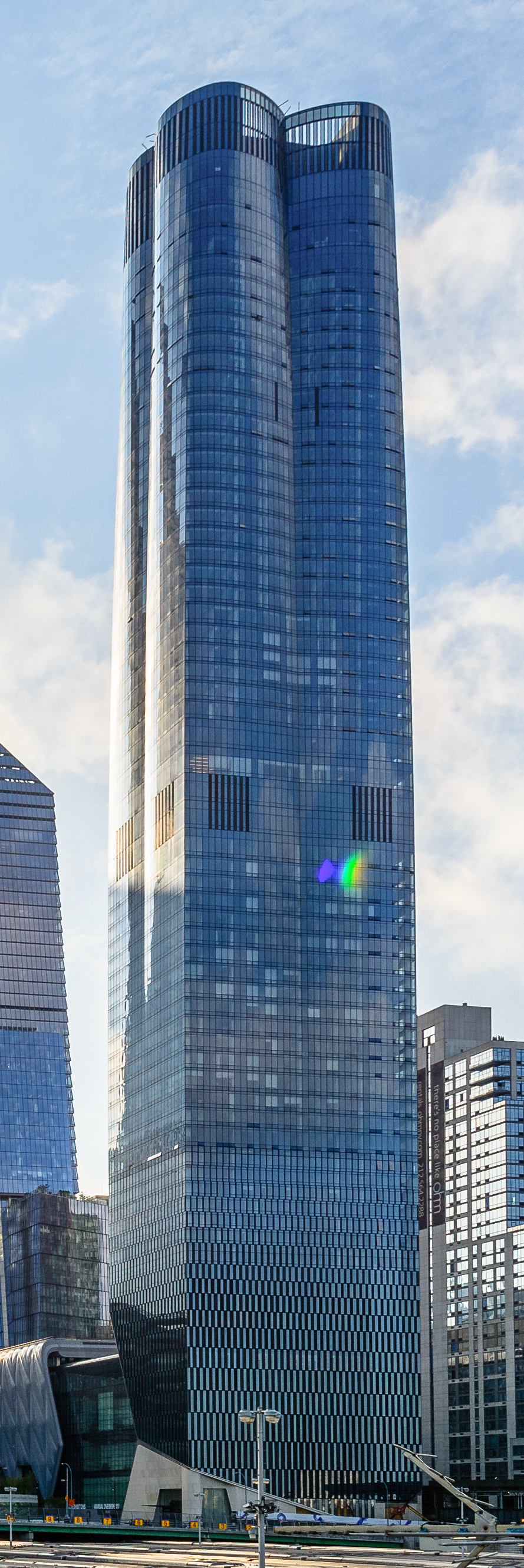
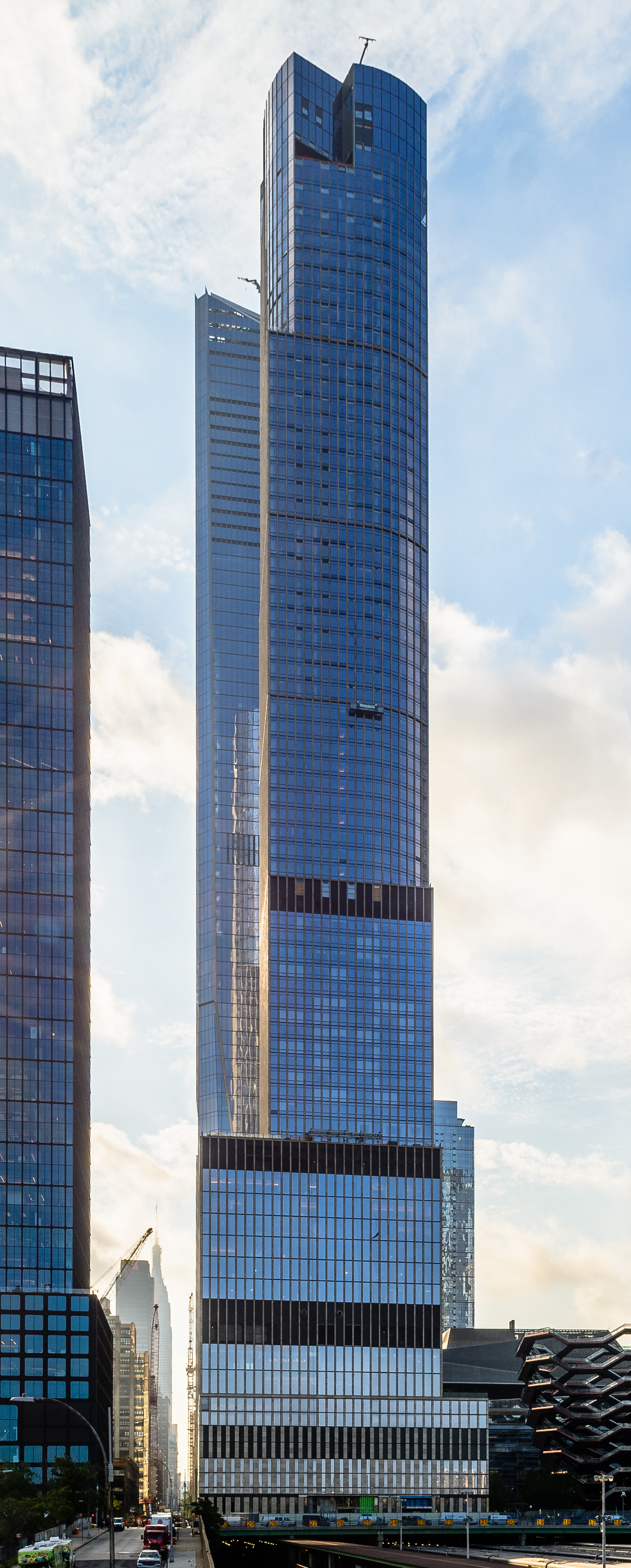
15 Hudson Yards and 35 Hudson Yards

35 Hudson Yards is located at Eleventh Avenue and 33rd Street. Construction on the building's foundation was started in January 2015, and it topped out in June 2018. 35 Hudson Yards opened on March 15, 2019. The mixed-use building contains 137 condominiums, an Equinox brand hotel, an Equinox brand gym, medical offices, and retail space. David Childs, the chairman of Skidmore, Owings & Merrill, contributed the designs.

=== 50 Hudson Yards ===
Work on the 985-foot (300 m)-tall 50 Hudson Yards, located at Tenth Avenue between 33rd and 34th Streets, began in May 2018, with construction completed in 2022. Designed by Foster + Partners, 50 Hudson Yards is New York City's fourth largest commercial office tower at 2.9 million square feet (270,000 m^{2}).

BlackRock occupies 850,000 square feet (79,000 m^{2}) in the building, with Meta occupying more space with 1.2 million square feet (110,000 m^{2}). Mitsui Fudosan owns a 90 percent stake in the building, while Bank of China, Deutsche Bank, and Wells Fargo contributed financing for the tower.

In September 2022, it was announced that Truist Financial had signed a lease for 100,000 square feet in the building. Russ & Daughters and Starbucks opened locations in the building in 2023.

In November 2024, Locanda Verde’s second location opened at 50 Hudson Yards.

=== 55 Hudson Yards ===
The 780-foot-tall (240 m), 1.3-million-square-foot (120,000 m^{2}) 55 Hudson Yards, located at Eleventh Avenue between 33rd and 34th Streets, was designed by Kohn Pedersen Fox and Roche-Dinkeloo, which is the first collaborative effort between the two firms. To lower costs and allow flexibility during the build, construction emphasized the use of concrete over steel.

55 Hudson Yards started construction on January 22, 2015, and topped out in August 2017. Mitsui Fudosan owns a 92.09 percent stake in the building. Like 50 Hudson Yards, 55 is not located over the rail yard, and was not included in the original master plan as created by KPF. Cooley, a law firm, occupies 130,000 square feet (12,000 m^{2}) across five stories. Another law firm, Milbank, occupies 250,000 square feet (23,000 m^{2}). American cryptocurrency trading platform Coinbase sublets 30,000 square feet (2,800 m^{2}) from Point72 Asset Management in the building.

=== 70 Hudson Yards ===
Construction on 70 Hudson Yards, located on Hudson Boulevard between 35th and 36th Street and directly adjacent to the No. 7 subway, broke ground in June 2025. Designed by Gensler and Roger Ferris + Partners and interiors by INC, 70 Hudson Yards will rise 717 feet (219 m) and span 1,400,000 feet (430,000 m). Deloitte will act as the building's anchor tenant, having leased 900,000 feet (270,000 m) of space in the building.

=== The Shops & Restaurants at Hudson Yards ===
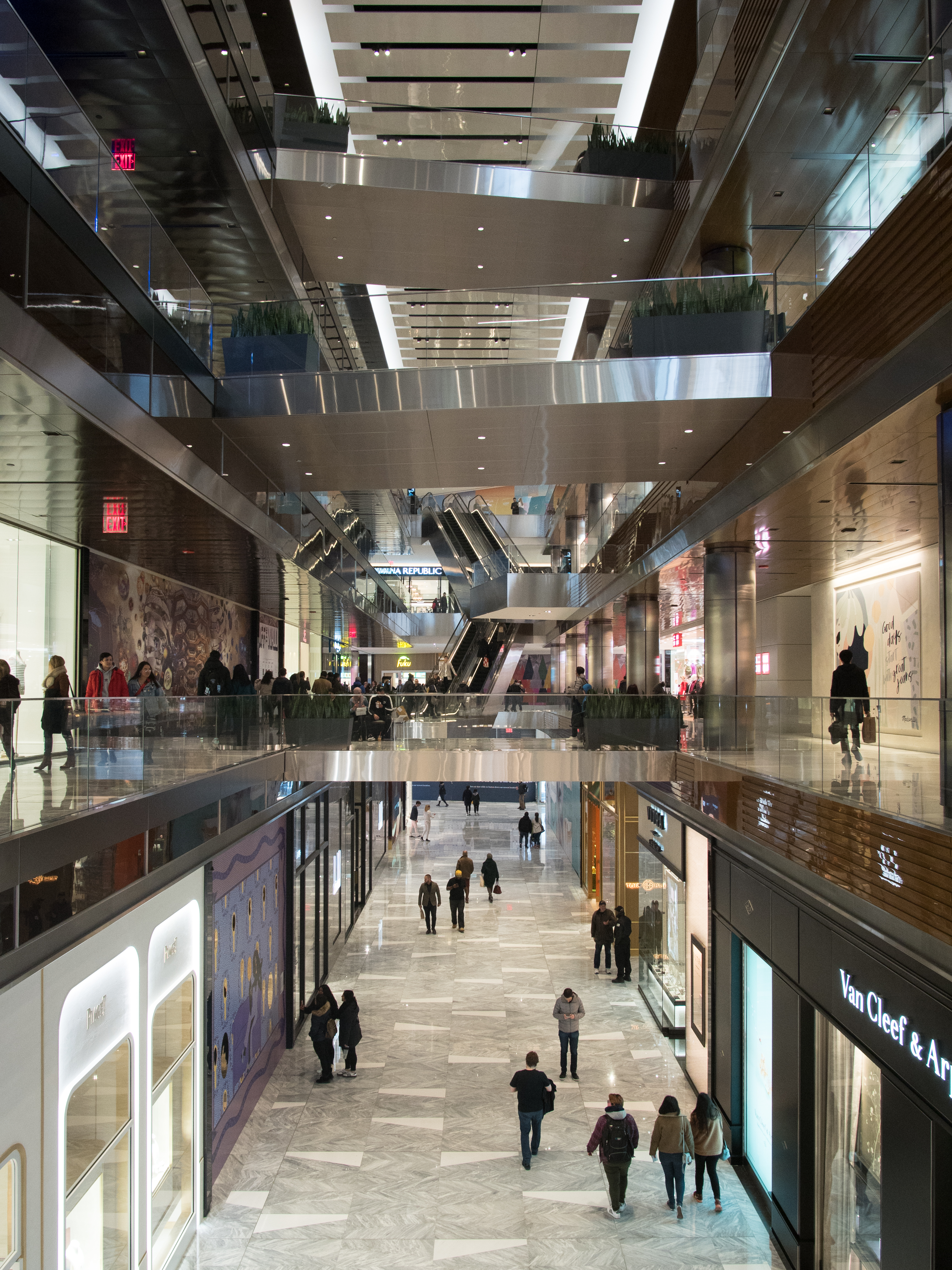
Interior of the mall, seen in March 2019

Phase 1 included a seven-story mall with 100 shops and 20 restaurants, called the Shops & Restaurants at Hudson Yards. It has 1 million square feet (93,000 m^{2}) of space.

In September 2014, Neiman Marcus signed to become the anchor tenant of the Hudson Yards Retail Space. The retail space, designed by Kohn Pedersen Fox and Elkus Manfredi Architects with a connection to the bases of 10 and 30 Hudson Yards, started construction in June 2015, with a 100,000-short-ton (91,000,000 kg) order of steel, one of the largest such orders in the history of the United States. The mall opened on March 15, 2019.

The Neiman Marcus store, which closed in 2020, occupied the top 3 levels and 1/4 of the mall, or 250,000 square feet (23,000 m^{2}) before it was converted to office space. There is fine dining on the fifth through seventh floors as well as more casual fare on the second through fourth floors. The mall is anchored by Dior as a ground floor tenant, with "a 'Fifth Avenue' mix of shops", such as H&M and Zara, below them. Tenants at the Shops at Hudson Yards include retailers such as Uniqlo, Edge, Alo Yoga, Bulgari, Monica Rich Kosann, Mango, Panerai, Warby Parker, Moschino, Costa Brazil and Marc Jacobs. The Shops at Hudson Yards also has dining options, including Shake Shack and Eataly Caffè, and the Edge attraction.

In November 2023, it was announced that the top three stories of the former Neiman Marcus store would be repurposed into 445,000 square feet of office space for Wells Fargo. Designed by Kohn Pedersen Fox and developed by Related Companies, the new space will accommodate 2,300 employees. As of June 2024, the facade of 20 Hudson Yards has begun its replacement process.

Five new restaurants were opened in 2025: Sailor's Choice, José Andrés’ Oyamel, Eataly Caffè, NAYA and Joe & The Juice.

As of August 2026, eight eateries have opened at Hudson Yards: Yono Sushi, Dunkin’ Donuts, Viva la Crepe, Myka, Dickson’s Farmstand, Malai Ice Cream, Just Salad and Chipotle Mexican Grill.

=== Public square ===
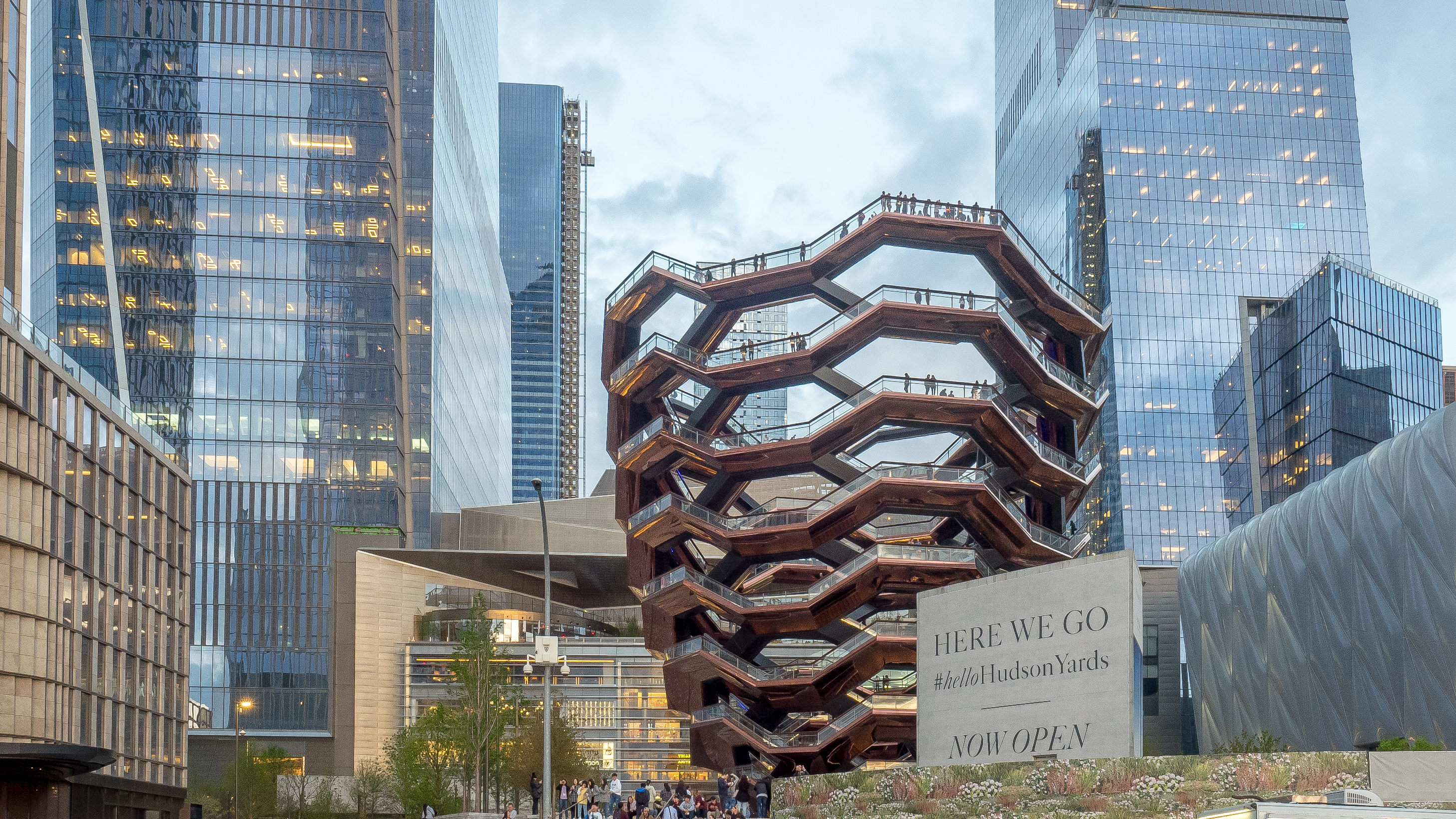
Vessel

There is a 5-acre (2 ha) public square, with 28,000 plants and 225 trees, on the platform. The public square is a ventilation area for the West Side Yards, as well as a storm water runoff site. Storm water that runs off into the square is reused throughout the development. Because it is located on top of an active rail yard, the public square is located over a 6-foot (1.8 m) deep plenum above a cooling slab with 15 fans blowing air at 45 miles per hour (72 km/h) and a 60,000-US-gallon (230,000 L; 50,000 imp gal) rainwater storage tank. The entire platform is supported by 234 caissons. The plantings are rooted within "smart soil" as part of the public space design by landscape architects Nelson Byrd Woltz, which takes inspiration from Hudson Valley upland forests as well as urban plazas. The plaza opened along with the mall on March 15, 2019.

Vessel, a permanent art installation designed by Thomas Heatherwick, is located at the center of the plaza. The installation, a 16-story freestanding structure of connected staircases, cost US$150 million. Heatherwick took inspiration from Indian step wells in the design. Stephen M. Ross has compared the structure to the Eiffel Tower, and it has also been informally dubbed The Shawarma. Vessel opened on March 15, 2019. After three suicides at the Vessel, Related closed the structure temporarily in January 2021. Vessel reopened in May 2021, with a rule requiring visitors to come in groups and a new ticket fee for most visitors, but Vessel was closed again in July 2021. Vessel reopened in October 2024 with new safety measures, including floor-to-ceiling steel mesh barriers.

=== Neighboring projects ===
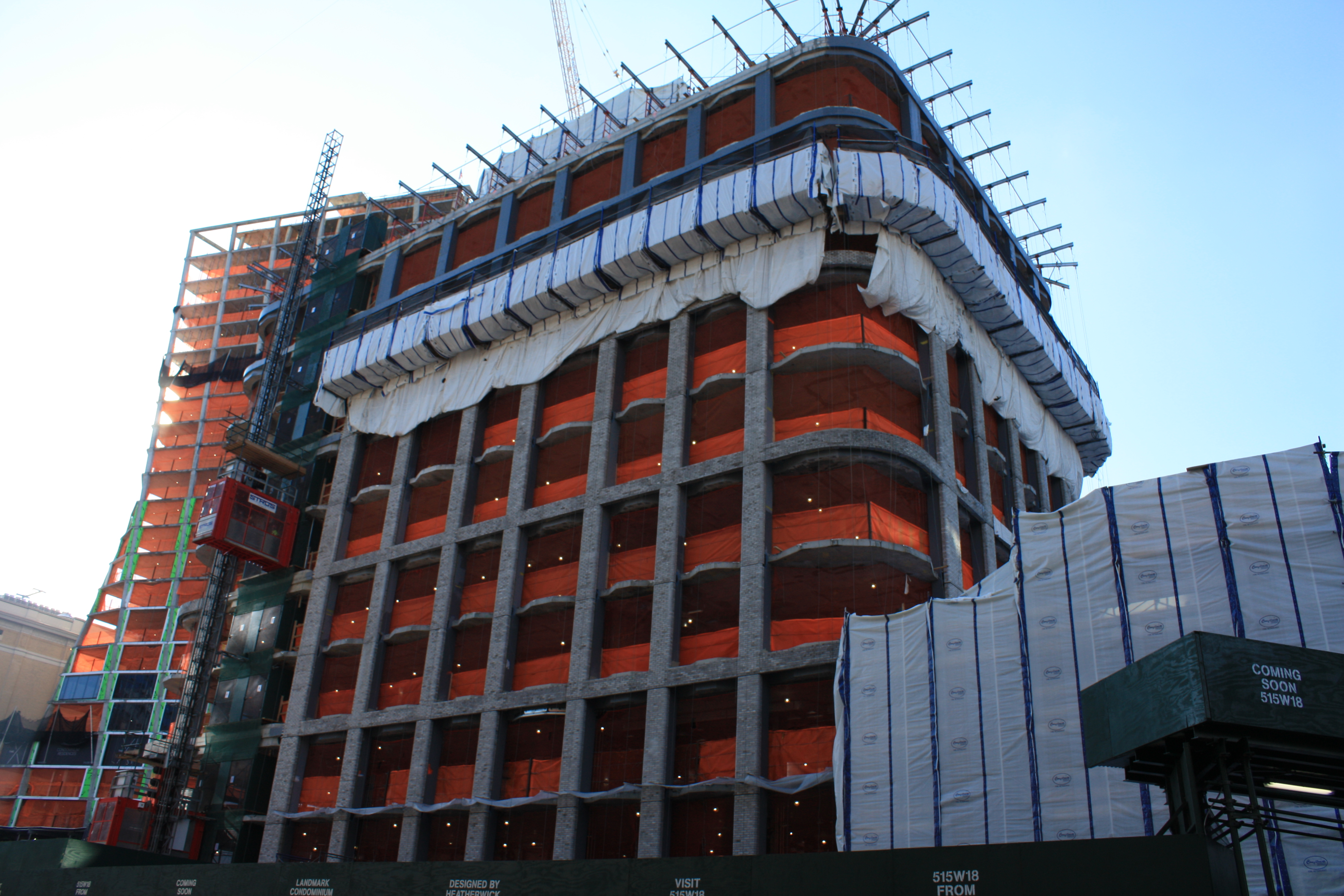
Hudson Residences building Lantern House under construction in March 2019

The Hudson Yards development sits directly west of the second-largest project in the area: Manhattan West, a 7-acre (2.8 ha) mixed-use multi-building development also built above previously exposed rail yards. Two large-scale, single-building office developments border the eastern portion of Hudson Yards. The larger, known as The Spiral, is owned by Tishman Speyer. The smaller development is known as 3 Hudson Boulevard.

Several existing or planned residential buildings border Phase 1. Related owns three: One Hudson Yards, Abington House and 451 Tenth Avenue. Despite sharing a developer, these buildings are distinct from the main Hudson Yards project.

Another Related development also on the West Side, originally dubbed "Hudson Residences", was under construction at the same time as Hudson Yards. The project consists of two residential buildings, one designed by Thomas Heatherwick, the other by Robert A.M. Stern Architects.

601 West 29th Street and 606 West 30th Street are under construction south of the two Related developments. Despite the involvement of two separate real estate companies, they are being developed together due to their proximity.

==== Joint ventures with Spitzer Enterprises ====
In 2020, Spitzer Enterprises and Related Companies received $276 million in loans for a 526-unit housing development in Hudson Yards at 451 10th Avenue. The building, also given the address 455 10th Avenue, includes a mix of "upscale urban senior living communities" and executive apartments. The senior living and executive apartments are respectively be marketed under the brands "The Coterie" and "The Set". Handel Architects designed 451 10th Avenue.

In October 2021, Related purchased 99.9% stakes in three sites owned by Spitzer Enterprises at 511 West 35th Street, 506 West 36th Street, and 512 West 36th Street.

== History ==
=== Older site proposals ===
Several developers and other entities proposed uses for the rail yard during the 20th century. In 1956, William Zeckendorf suggested the construction of the "Freedom Tower", which would have risen 1,750 feet (530 m), making it the tallest building in the world at the time. Transportation to the new complex would have been via a "passenger conveyor belt" from further east in Midtown. Zeckendorf never purchased the rights, as he was unable to secure financing for the deal, given that large-scale speculative real estate projects were not an asset class that institutional investors and lenders took an interest in at the time. The administration of Mayor Robert F. Wagner Jr. released a $670 million development plan in 1963, which was ultimately never realized.

In the 1980s, both the Jets and the Yankees proposed new stadiums above the rails, though none of these projects succeeded. Another ultimately unsuccessful plan for a new stadium for the Yankees was proposed above the West Side Yard in 1993. A similar plan for a Yankee stadium above the West Side Yard was proposed in 1996, and was endorsed by mayor Rudy Giuliani. However, the plan also received opposition from many other public figures, and was also not built.

By the early 2000s, plans for the rail yard included a new Olympic stadium, to become the home of the Jets after the games ended. Proposers dubbed the structure the "New York Sports and Convention Center". In addition to the stadium, rezoning the adjacent area would have incentivized the construction of some 13,000 new residential units and 28 million square feet (2,600,000 m^{2}) of office space. This effort, led by Daniel Doctoroff, was unpopular with the public and politicians.

In January 2005, the New York City Council approved the 60-block rezoning, including the eastern portion of the West Side Yard. Michael Bloomberg, then the city's mayor, subsequently separated the city's broader rezoning plans from the rail yard stadium. In conjunction with the city, the Metropolitan Transportation Authority (MTA) issued a Request for Proposal (RFP) for a 12.7-million-square-foot (1,180,000 m^{2}) mixed-use development to be built on platforms over the rail yard, which would remain in use throughout.

The MTA received three bids to cap and lease the rail yard. Cablevision (the owner of the nearby Madison Square Garden), the New York Jets organization, and TransGas Energy all submitted proposals. The Jets won the development rights, but several lawsuits filed after the bidding process alleged they won without paying a fair price. In June 2005, New York State Assembly speaker Sheldon Silver voted against the stadium, definitively eliminating the possibility of support at the state level and the possibility of the stadium's construction. Although Bloomberg and others expressed doubts about interest in the area from real estate companies after the stadium fell through, development nevertheless continued. The former mayor later expressed that the loss of the stadium may have been a "blessing" for New York.

The MTA received proceeds from the development's 2006 bond offering to pay for an extension of the New York City Subway's 7 and <7> trains to 34th Street–Hudson Yards station. With funding assured, the MTA proceeded quickly to construct the extension. The first construction contracts were awarded in October 2007, and the subway extension opened on September 13, 2015.

=== Bidding process ===
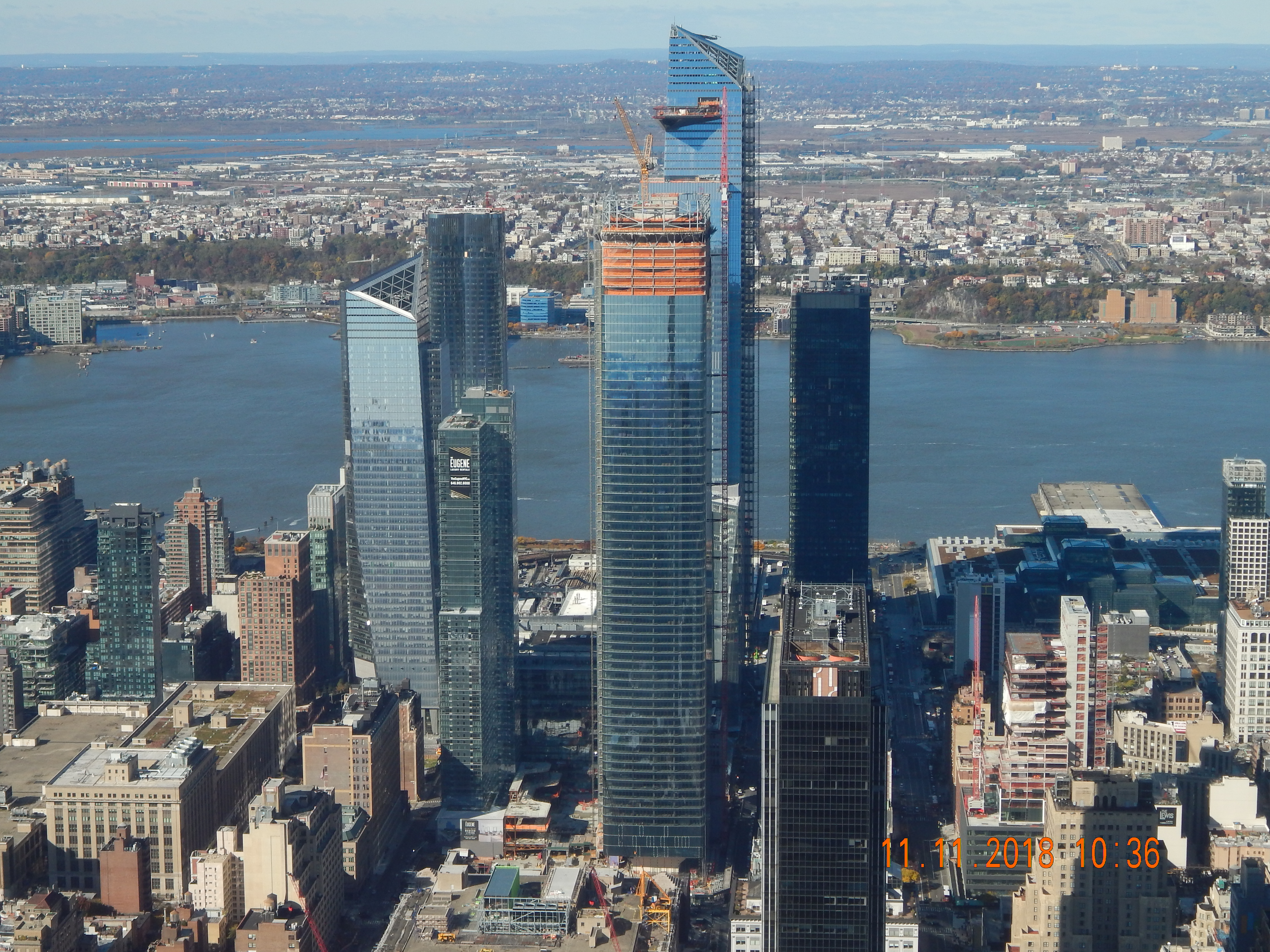
Hudson Yards seen from the 102nd floor of the Empire State Building, November 2018

In late 2006, the city and the MTA backed out of a plan for the city to purchase the development site, and created a proposal to seek bids from private developers. This was followed by a formal request for proposals in 2008 with the intention of creating a large-scale mixed-use development above the rail yards. Five developers responded to the RFP: Extell Development Company, Tishman Speyer, Brookfield, Vornado Realty Trust with the Durst Organization, and the Related Companies.

==== Submissions ====
Brookfield's Skidmore, Owings and Merrill-designed master plan known as "Hudson Place" and "Hudson Green" proposed constructing 15 towers (four office and 11 residential/hotel) that would range in height from 300 feet (91 m) to 1,280 feet (390 m). The buildings would include 7.4 million square feet (690,000 m^{2}) of office space and 4,000 residential units, including 400 devoted to affordable housing. "Hudson Place" encompassed the office component covering the eastern portion of the railyards while "Hudson Green" was residential-focused and planned for the western railyards. Individual towers would have been designed by SHoP Architects, SANAA, Thomas Phifer, Handel Architects, and Diller Scofidio + Renfro. The development would have also included two hotels, a cultural center, school, two parks (4.4 acres for Hudson Green and 3.4 acres for Hudson Place), and 100,000 square feet (9,300 m^{2}) of space for the Children's Museum of Manhattan.

Durst and Vornado hired FXCollaborative and César Pelli to design a development named "Hudson Center" which would have included 13 towers ranging from 250 feet (76 m) to 1,200 feet (370 m) tall. The development would be split between 6 million square feet (560,000 m^{2}) of office space and 6,500 residential units, 600 of which would have been affordable. The developers also would have included 12 acres of open space and a subterranean people mover system connecting the complex to Penn Station. Media company Condé Nast agreed to anchor the development by taking all 1.5 million square feet (140,000 m^{2}) of office space in the largest office tower and move from their headquarters at Durst's 4 Times Square in 2015.

Extell, in a master plan designed by Steven Holl, proposed 11 towers with just two featuring office space and the rest devoted to 3,812 residential units. The company's proposal also featured 19.5 acres of outdoor space including an outdoor amphitheatre and a sculpture garden named after Sol LeWitt. The company also would have built a new ferry terminal on the Hudson River as well as a Long Island Rail Road stop at the site. Extell's proposal fundamentally differed from the others' proposals, as they proposed constructing a suspension deck over the rail yards, similar to a suspension bridge, rather than the truss structure every other developer proposed. Extell claimed this method would be more cost-effective but the suspension structure also would not have been strong enough to support large buildings. Due to this, all of Extell's proposed towers were clustered at the edges of the site in order to sit on solid ground while the deck itself would hold only the proposal's open spaces and park. Other unique aspects included a central reservoir to collect stormwater, a geothermal cooling system, and cogeneration which together would reduce energy use by almost 50%. Writing in The Wall Street Journal, Ada Louise Huxtable praised the proposal, writing that it "could have the unity, character and potential beauty of a Rockefeller Center." The New York Times added to the praise, writing that the "proposal is the only one worth serious consideration."

Related's initial proposal envisioned 13 towers split between 3 office building and 10 residential structures. The company divided the space between 6.7 million square feet (620,000 m^{2}) of office space and 4,962 residential units. The towers would have varied in height from 350 feet (110 m) to 1,100 feet (340 m) and been designed by a diverse array of architects including Arquitectonica, Robert A. M. Stern, and Kohn Pedersen Fox. Proposed amenities included a school, winter garden, and 15.1 acres of open space. Related also secured a commitment from Rupert Murdoch's News Corporation to move their headquarters into one of the new office towers at the development. However, News Corporation later pulled out of the deal which led Related to bid only on the residential-focused Western railyard rather than the entire site. Due to this, the MTA disqualified the Related bid.

Tishman Speyer's bid, designed by Helmut Jahn, covered 11 towers centered on four large office towers surrounded by seven smaller residential buildings. Two of the office towers would have stood at 900 feet (270 m) while the other two would be taller at 1,100 feet (340 m) with the accompanying residential buildings varying between 400 feet (120 m) and 570 feet (170 m) tall. The company's bid was the most office-focused with plans featuring 10.6 million square feet (980,000 m^{2}) of commercial space and 3,000 residential units. The proposed buildings would total over 12 million square feet (1,100,000 m^{2}) of space with 13 acres of open space and also include 379 units of affordable housing. Investment bank Morgan Stanley would have occupied all 3 million square feet (280,000 m^{2}) of office space in both the taller office towers as the company's headquarters and also would have provided equity and debt financing for the project.

==== Selection ====
Tishman Speyer, a New York-based real estate conglomerate, won the bid in March 2008. Tishman Speyer won a $1 billion bid to lease and cap the West Side Yard, with payment due as annual rent over a 99-year period. It would also spend another $2 billion for development over the rail yards, including for the two platforms over the yards to support 15 acres (6.1 ha) of public spaces, four office buildings, and ten high-rise residential towers. Tishman had secured the investment bank Morgan Stanley as both an anchor tenant and financial backer.

Two months later, the deal broke down when Morgan Stanley pulled out due to the 2008 financial crisis. Subsequently, the MTA chose the Related Companies and Goldman Sachs to develop Hudson Yards under the same conditions. Related's revised plan included 13 buildings encompassing 12 million square feet of space including 2,154 rental apartments, 20% of which would be affordable. Other components included 2,619 condominiums, 5.5 million square feet (510,000 m^{2}) of offices, a hotel, about 757,000 square feet (70,300 m^{2}) of retail, a school and a 200,000 sq ft (19,000 m^{2}) cultural facility.

In December 2009, the New York City Council approved Related Companies' revised plan for Hudson Yards, and the western portion of the West Side Yard was rezoned. Following the rail yards' successful rezoning, the MTA signed another 99-year lease to the air rights over the rail yard in May 2010. The air rights were signed over to a joint venture of Related Companies and Oxford Properties Group, which invested $400 million to build a platform above both the eastern and western portions of the yard on which to construct the buildings.

In April 2013, the Related/Oxford joint venture obtained a $475 million construction loan from parties including Barry Sternlicht's Starwood Capital Group and luxury retailer Coach. The financing deal was unique in several aspects, including the fact that it included a construction mezzanine loan, that Coach was a lender on both the debt and equity sides, and that the MTA reused a "severable lease" structure (previously used by Battery Park City) that allowed for the loans. A portion of the project was also financed by the EB-5 investment program.

=== Construction and opening ===
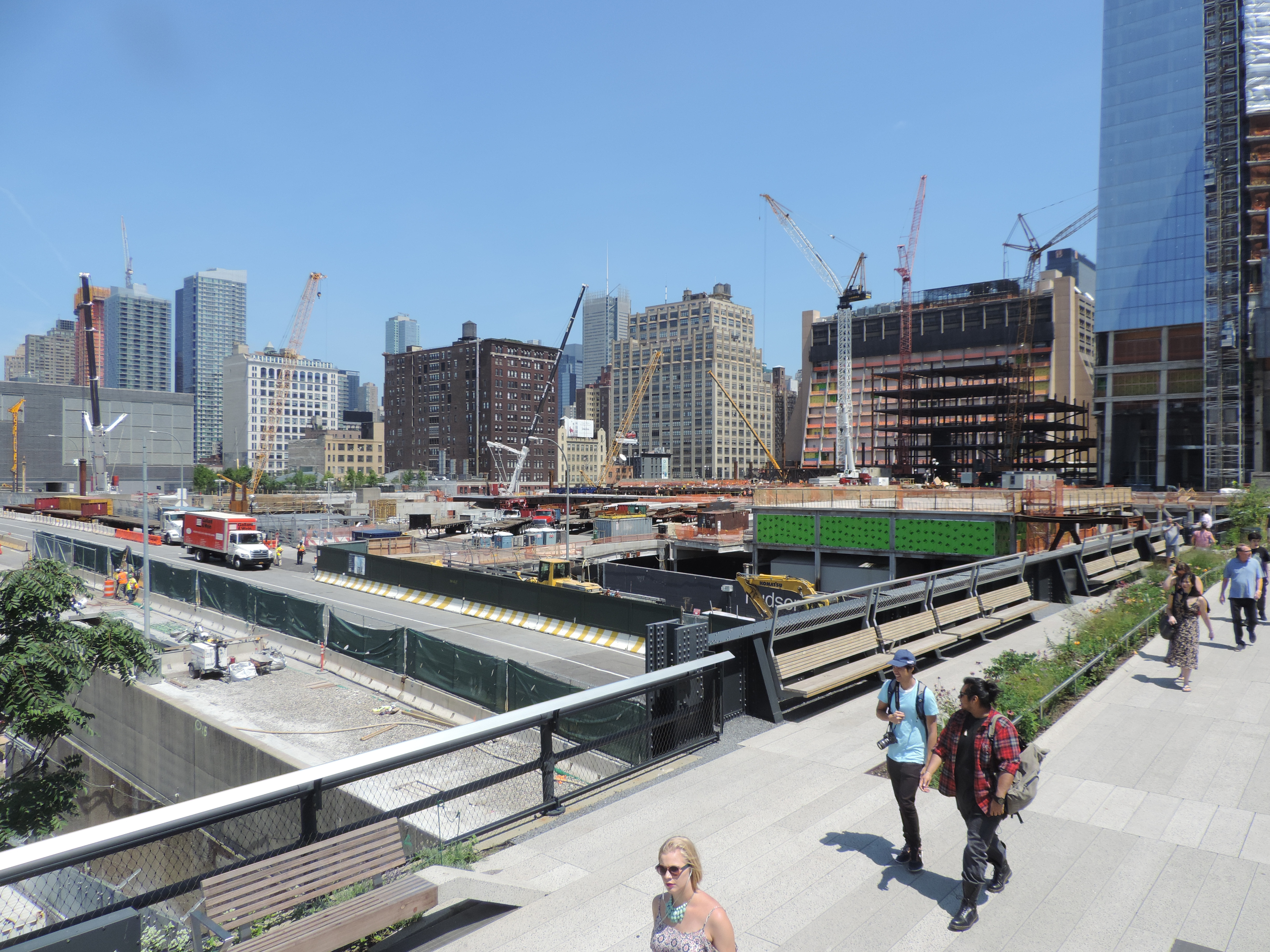
Hudson Yards under construction in 2015

The groundbreaking for 10 Hudson Yards, which was not built on the platform, occurred on December 4, 2012. At that event, the start of construction was also announced for 30 Hudson Yards. No tenants had been secured for any building in the complex when construction started on 10 Hudson Yards. However, three tenants—L'Oreal, Coach, and SAP—were announced in 2013.

In October 2013, New York's Industrial Development Agency granted Related a $328 million tax exemption for 20 and 30 Hudson Yards, in addition to the previously approved $106 million exemption for 10 Hudson Yards. Shortly after, Related announced construction would begin on the platform covering the eastern railyards in January 2014 and cost $721 million. Construction on the platform began in March 2014 after Related secured a $250 million loan from Deutsche Bank. The erection of the platform was necessary in order to start construction on 15, 30, and 35 Hudson Yards. The platform for the Eastern Rail Yard was completed in October 2015, and the western platform was completed by 2016. In anticipation of the completion of the structures at Hudson Yards, the section of the High Line elevated park adjacent to the development opened in September 2014. After several delays in the completion of the 34th Street subway station, the station opened the following September. However, the first building in the complex, 10 Hudson Yards, did not open until May 31, 2016.

Groundbreaking occurred for 15 Hudson Yards in December 2014, and work on 35 Hudson Yards and 55 Hudson Yards both started the following month. Construction on The Shed, adjacent to 15 Hudson Yards, began in mid-2015 after its pilings were completed. A 16-story, honeycomb-shaped structure with stairwells named Vessel, in the center of Hudson Yards' public plaza, was unveiled to the public in September 2016. The pieces of Vessel were fabricated off-site and were brought to Hudson Yards for assembly starting in April 2017. Work on the final building in the first phase, 50 Hudson Yards, began in May 2018.

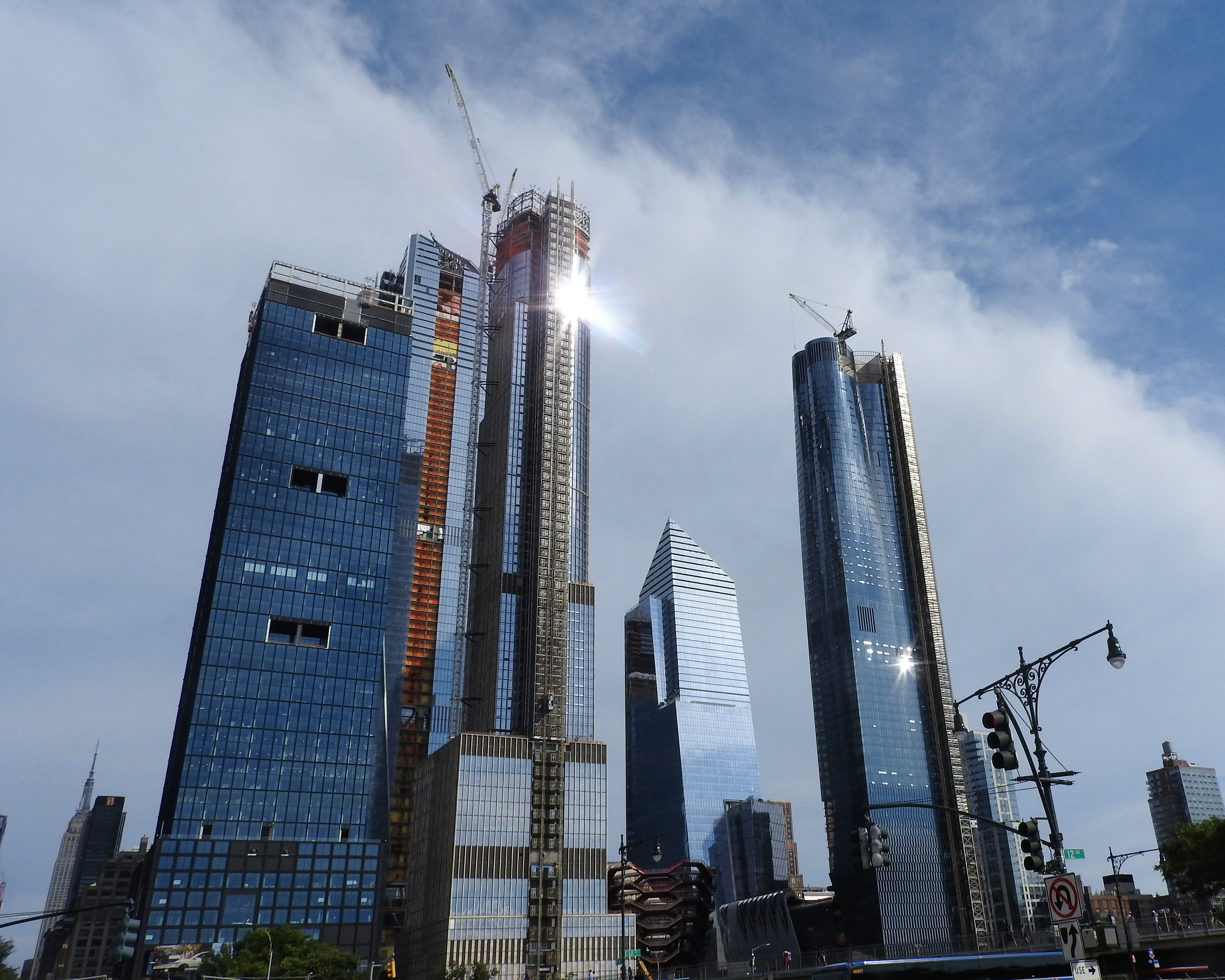
Further construction, August 2018

55 Hudson Yards topped out in August 2017, while 15, 30, and 35 Hudson Yards all topped out in 2018. All four structures were opened on March 14, 2019, as were the Shed, shopping center, and Vessel. In addition, neither the High Line nor the 34th Street station were completed at the time of their respective openings. A second entrance to the 34th Street station was opened in September 2018, while the High Line spur adjacent to 10 Hudson Yards opened in June 2019.

Beginning in late 2017, unions working at the site alleged that the developers "continue[d] to look for deeper and deeper concessions" in their negotiations, and begin organizing a campaign referred to as "#CountMeIn". Their push to change the site to an open shop has affected the second phase of construction, on the western yard, despite meetings between labor leader Gary LaBarbera and Related executive Bruce Beal Jr.

=== 2020s to present ===
==== COVID-19 pandemic and recovery ====
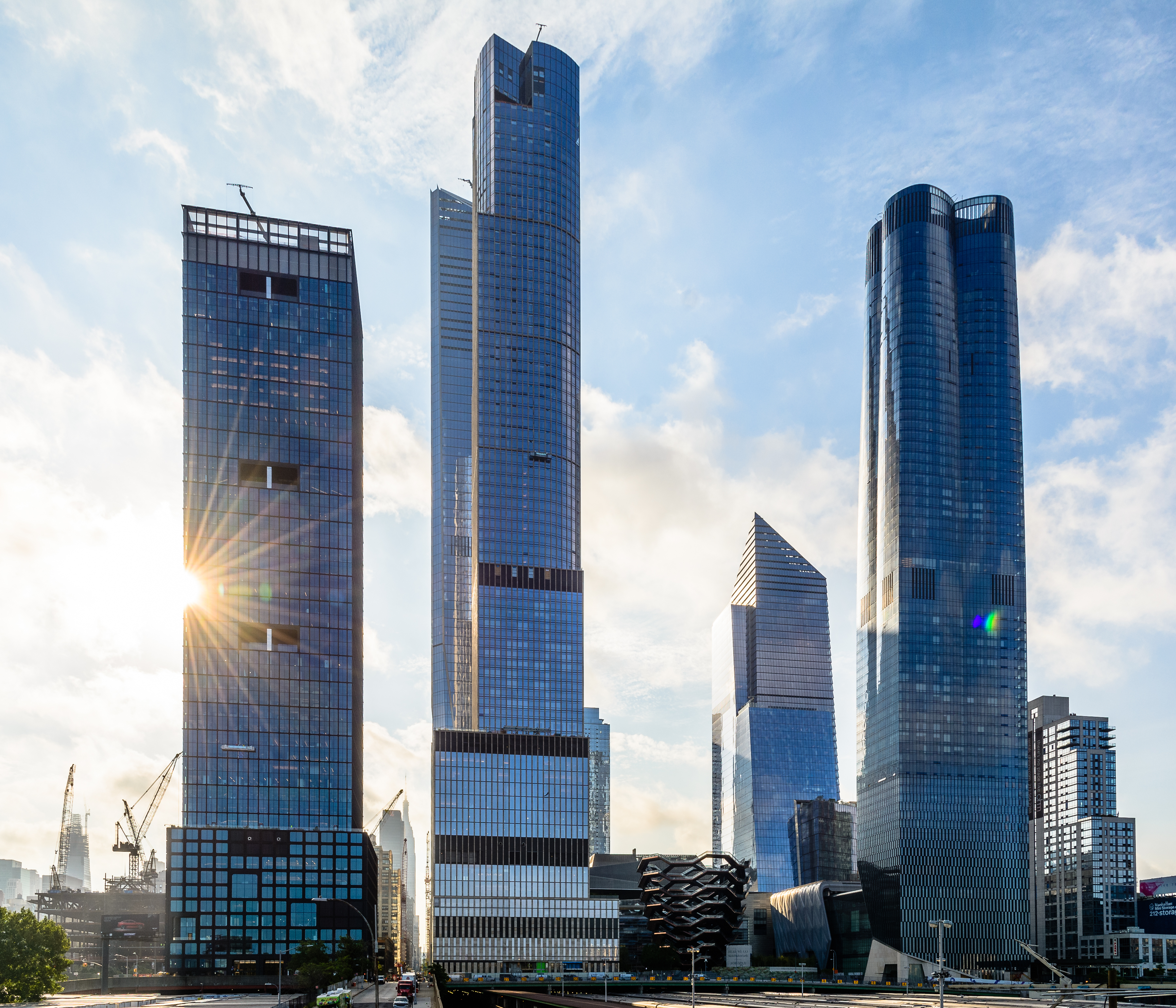
Facing east toward Hudson Yards in 2021

Edge observation deck on the 100th floor of 30 Hudson Yards had opened on March 11, 2020, but the onset of the COVID-19 pandemic in New York City caused Related to close Edge two days later. The restaurant on the 101st floor of the same building, Peak, also opened on March 11 but closed the following day after a staff member contracted COVID-19. In April 2020, The Wall Street Journal reported that condominium sales had slowed due to the pandemic. The Journal also noted a downturn in retail rent collections at the development. This decline occurred in part due to unique contracts between Related and its tenants, which meant the developer collected income based on sales, rather than traditional fixed payments. In May 2020, the Financial Times noted the development had become a "ghost town".

The Wall Street Journal reported in July that the Hudson Yards Neiman Marcus location, the flagship of the development's retail offerings, would close. Related opted to turn the Neiman Marcus store into offices instead of a store. Thomas Keller closed his TAK restaurant in the complex in August 2020. The Hudson Yards mall reopened in September 2020, though Bloomberg noted few visitors. The Edge observation deck also reopened that month.

==== Further tenants ====
Despite the closures, Barclays reportedly considered Hudson Yards as a location for a new American headquarters in late 2020. Additionally, BlackRock indicated in early 2021 that it still intended to move its headquarters to 50 Hudson Yards in 2022 or 2023. It joined Ernst and Young in companies relocating to Hudson Yards by 2024. Due to the financial problems caused by the pandemic, Related has sought a low-interest loan from the Department of Transportation to cap the western yard, the first step in beginning the project's second phase. A 2023 study from The Real Deal magazine found that rental rates for Class A office space, the highest class of offices, were twice the rates for Class B office space. As a result, its developers were paying the city government $200 million more annually than the city had anticipated.

By early 2024, more than 90 percent of the office space at Hudson Yards was occupied, including all of the space in several buildings. Additionally, average monthly visits increased 19 percent year-on-year and over 80 percent of employees at Hudson Yards worked in-person between Monday and Thursday, triple the comparable rate citywide. In 2025, Deloitte leased much of the space at 70 Hudson Yards, allowing work on that building to begin; at the time, 70 Hudson Yards was to be completed in 2027–2028. The building was to have 47 stories and would be located on Hudson Boulevard East between 35th and 36th Streets. In 2026, the original office buildings reached full occupancy for the first time.

Hudson Yards hosted the 2024 Stonewall Day benefit concert, with proceeds supporting the Stonewall National Monument. Cynthia Erivo headlined the show and other featured performers included Conchita Wurst, Lina Bradford, and Loren Allred. In September 2024, Hudson Yards, through a partnership with WME and IMG, hosted New York Fashion Week runway shows.

=== Future development ===
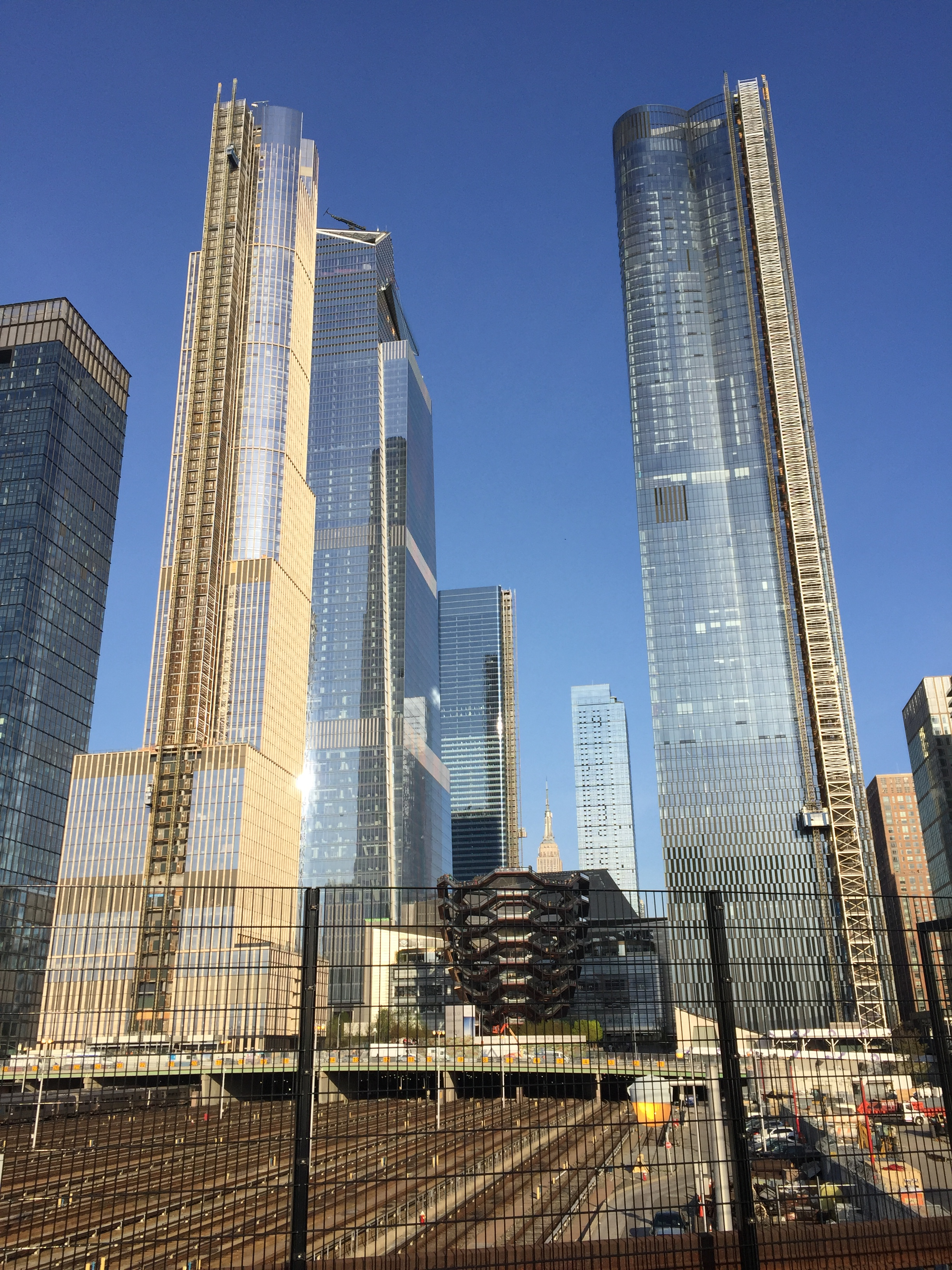
The western portion of West Side Yard, visible in the foreground, is the site for the proposed Phase 2

The western portion of the yard is bordered by 30th Street and 33rd Street in the north and south, and Eleventh and Twelfth avenues in the east and west. The western phase of the project was originally to contain up to seven residential towers, an office building at 33rd Street and Eleventh Avenue tentatively known as "West Tower", and a school serving Pre-K to eighth grade students. The third phase of the High Line will traverse Phase 2 of the project. According to Architectural Digest magazine, Santiago Calatrava, Robert A.M. Stern Architects, Thomas Heatherwick, and Frank Gehry are involved in the design of the second phase's residential towers. Related Companies had previously commissioned works from Stern, Heatherwick, and Gehry.

Work on the platform to cover the second half of the tracks was originally scheduled to begin in 2018; however, construction was later rescheduled to begin in 2019. Around $500 million of financing for Phase 2 was approved in mid-2018.

==== Wynn New York City proposal ====
Wynn New York City
- Interactive map of Wynn New York City
- Location: Hudson Yards, New York City, New York, United States
- Opened: canceled
- No. of rooms: 1,500- 1,750
- Gaming space: 250,000 sq ft (23,000 m^{2})
- Casino type: Resort
- Operating license holder: Wynn Resorts

In late 2022, multiple sources reported that Related had entered into a partnership with Wynn Resorts to attempt to develop an integrated resort with a casino on the western yard, presumably replacing earlier plans. The next year, it was announced that the plan would include a "'resort' tower", developed with Wynn, as well as a casino and hotel. The plan includes a previously unannounced 2-million-square-foot office tower, as well as a previously disclosed apartment building, school, and park. This plan would require that the partnership secure one of several available licenses, issued by New York state, for casinos in New York City and its surroundings. Competitors for the casino licenses included a joint venture between SL Green Realty and Caesars Entertainment, Soloviev Group, and other bidders.

The 1,189 feet (362 m) proposed hotel, located west of 11th Avenue, would have been 80 stories tall and would have included 1,500 or 1,750 rooms, making it one of largest hotels in New York City if built. In March 2024, Wynn Resorts released renderings of the proposed resort and other components of the western portion of the project. In July 2024, the non-profit group Friends of the High Line claimed that the plan to build a 20-story podium and skyscraper on the western section of the site would overwhelm the park. In response, a revised plan was presented in mid-2024, with 5.6 acres (2.3 ha) of public green space. In January 2025, Manhattan Community Board 4 completed a non-binding vote to recommend that the casino not be approved. Manhattan Borough President Mark Levine also opposed zoning changes for the casino in favor of adding more housing; the new proposal reduces the number of total residential units, though with the same number of affordable units. Despite this opposition, the project secured approval from the City Planning Commission in April 2025. Later that month, Wynn and Related added 2,500 apartments to the proposal, increasing the amount of proposed housing units in the area to 4,000. Wynn Resorts canceled the Wynn New York City proposal when they withdrew their bid for a downstate New York casino license on May 19, citing community opposition and complex zoning laws. Wynn would instead focus on their existing properties and their upcoming Wynn Al Marjan Island development.

==== 2025 plan ====
In May 2025, Related announced their new development plans for the western portion of the Hudson Yards. Under this plan, 4,000 housing units would be built and a new office building would be included. A 6.6-acre (2.7 ha) public park would surround the new development. That June, Related and New York City mayor Eric Adams announced that 625 of the new apartments would be affordable and that, in addition to the park, there would be a daycare and a 750-student public school. The City Council subsequently rezoned the western part of Hudson Yards to allow for the new development. That September, the city offered Related $2 billion for the development of the western part of Hudson Yards, which would cover the cost of a platform, rent payments to the MTA for the use of air rights, and some funding for a new school on the site. The subsidies needed to be approved by Adams's successor Zohran Mamdani, who had expressed skepticism of public financing for large corporate endeavors.

== Rail yard platform ==
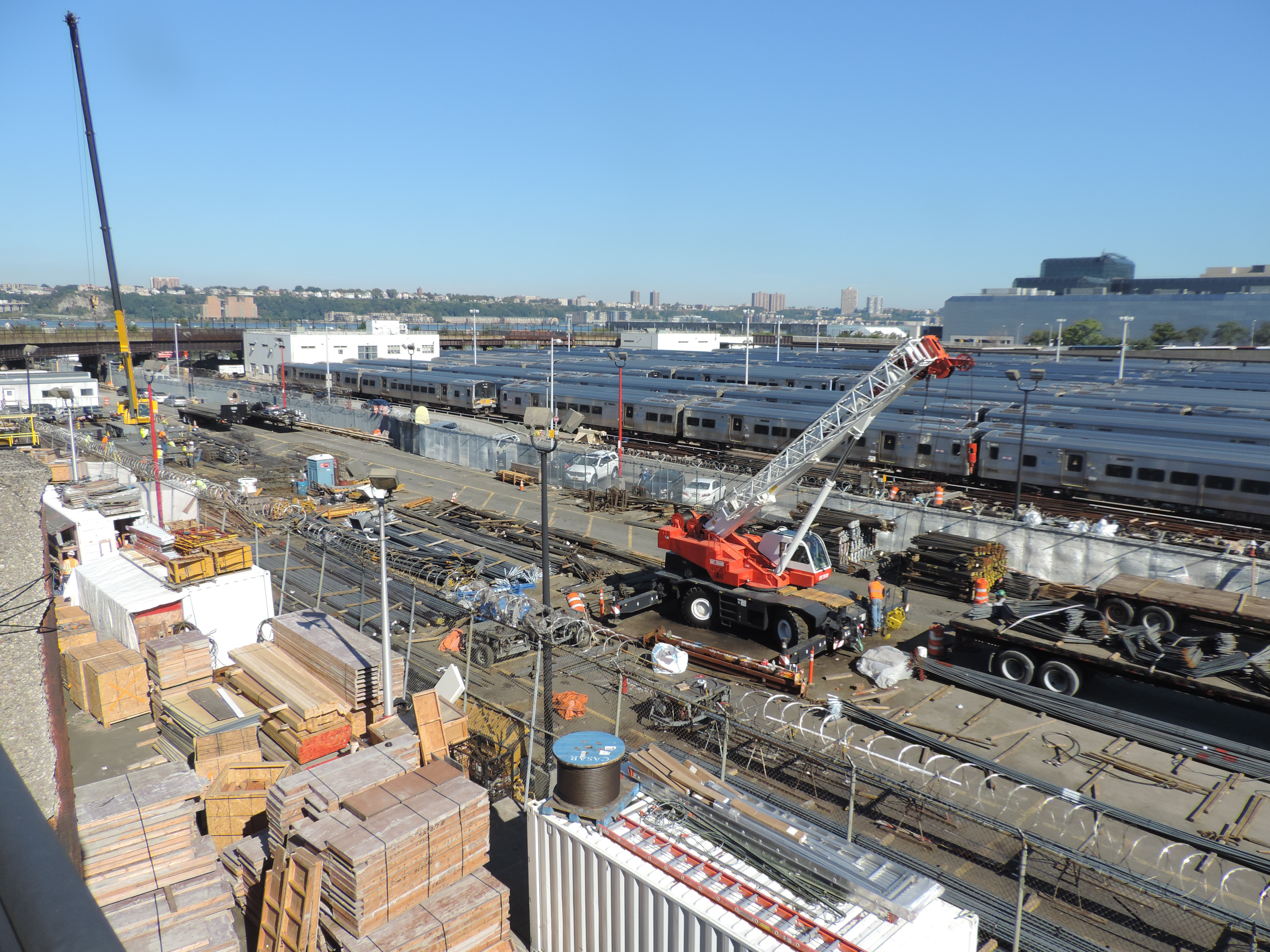
30th Street staging area for construction equipment and materials

The Hudson Yards development stands atop a platform that is bordered by 10th and 12th Avenues and by 30th and 33rd Streets. In 2014, it was expected to cost more than $20 billion and was projected to eventually see 65,000 visitors a day. Construction on the platform began in March 2014. Construction was overseen by Related Companies' executive vice president, Timur Galen.

The 28-acre (11 ha) Hudson Yards project is located in the Hudson Yards area of Manhattan, between the Chelsea and Hell's Kitchen neighborhoods. It was constructed over the existing at-grade West Side Yard, allowing LIRR trains to continue to be stored during midday hours. To minimize construction impact on the LIRR's ability to store trains during midday and peak hours, caissons were drilled into bedrock throughout much of the site, over which the platform was to be built. However, only 38% of the ground level at West Side Yard was to be filled in with columns to support the development. Much of the platform itself was built by a huge Manitowoc 18000 crane. The eastern platform, supporting the towers, comprises 16 bridges. The platform for the Eastern Rail Yard was completed in October 2015, and the western part of the platform was completed the following year.

In 2013, Amtrak announced it would build a "tunnel box" through the project areas to reserve the space for a future rail right-of-way such as the proposed Gateway Project. Construction began September 2013 and took two years. The underground concrete casing is 800 ft (240 m) long, 50 ft (15 m) wide, and approximately 35 ft (11 m) tall.

== Financing and ownership ==
Projected to cost $25 billion upon its completion, Hudson Yards is one of the most expensive real estate developments ever built in the United States, and the largest private development in the country's history. Under the terms of their agreement with Oxford, Related retains a 60 percent stake in the complex. Related develops and subsequently retains ownership of rental buildings it constructs, meaning it has a large portfolio of affordable rental properties that provide consistent income. Initial funding came exclusively from Related and partner Goldman Sachs. After Goldman exited this arrangement, Related and its new partner, Oxford, secured a number of capital sources. These include conventional lenders, such as Wells Fargo, foreign investors through the EB-5 program, and a debt raise on the Tel Aviv Stock Exchange. Other lenders include The Children's Investment Fund Foundation, Deutsche Bank, and Allianz. As of September 2017, Related had raised about $18 billion in funds.

Related has also received or otherwise benefited from $6 billion in investments and tax breaks from the city in conjunction with Hudson Yards' construction. While The New York Times described the $6 billion as comprising numerous "tax breaks", a columnist for Crain's New York Business disputed this statement, saying, "There are two significant tax breaks which the New School totals at a little more than $1.36 billion", and that the rest of the investment was in infrastructure such as parks and the 7 Subway Extension. The $6 billion sum includes:

- $1.6 billion given by Empire State Development Corporation to Hudson Yards. The agency, which distributes funding through geographical districts, classified Hudson Yards as being in the same "economically troubled area" as the sparsely populated Central Park and low-income housing developments in Harlem, thereby qualifying the project for EB-5 funds.
- Funds for infrastructure projects that will serve the new development, including:
  - $2.4 billion spent on the 7 Subway Extension project.
  - $1.2 billion for Hudson Park and Boulevard.

An additional $1 billion was given to other developers who were building nearby projects.

In 2023, New York City Comptroller Brad Lander publicly stated on NY1 News that "Hudson Yards is giving about $200 million more a year than we expected" and that the number is going "to grow to $300 million." Lander also admitted that he "got it wrong" and that "the Hudson yards mega-project was not the money-for-the-rich boondoggle he and so many naysayers claimed it was doomed to be."

== Tenants ==
10 Hudson Yards is occupied by Tapestry Inc., the Boston Consulting Group, L'Oréal, SAP, Intercept Pharmaceuticals, VaynerMedia, and Sidewalk Labs.

30 Hudson Yards is occupied by Skydance Corporation, Covington & Burling, Susquehanna International Group (SIG), DNB Bank, Wells Fargo Securities, and KKR.

50 Hudson Yards, which opened in 2022, hosts the corporate headquarters of BlackRock and Meta. It also features Truist Financial, Russ & Daughters and Starbucks as tenants.

55 Hudson Yards is occupied by law firms (Boies, Schiller & Flexner; Cooley LLP; and Milbank, Tweed, Hadley & McCloy), as well as by Coinbase and the financial company MarketAxess. The city has enticed large tenants to Hudson Yards by making them eligible for discretionary tax credits once they add a certain number of jobs there.

The Shops at Hudson Yards include retailers and businesses such as: Uniqlo, Shake Shack, Edge, Alo Yoga, Bulgari, Monica Rich Kosann, Mango, Eataly, and Panerai.

Joe Patrice, writing for Above the Law, noted that with the move of Cooley LLP to 55 Hudson Yards from the Grace Building there was an "official trend" of law firms moving to the new office buildings on the far West Side. This move westward follows a trend from earlier in the 21st century, when firms began moving from parts of Midtown such as the Plaza District to Times Square and other areas with new office towers.

A number of financial firms have left offices in Midtown or the Financial District for the development. Following speculation that private equity company KKR might move to Hudson Yards, other finance-focused companies became more interested in the possibility of relocating there. KKR's long-time occupancy at the Solow Building in Midtown produced a similar effect, as Apollo Global Management, Och-Ziff Capital Management, and Silver Lake Partners had also taken space in the Midtown building. KKR ultimately decided to move to 30 Hudson Yards; Silver Lake announced it would leave the Solow Building for 55 Hudson Yards in 2017 after speculation it would do so. BlackRock, another major financial company, signed on as an anchor tenant at 50 Hudson Yards, where it occupies 850,000 square feet (79,000 m^{2}). Financial Times wrote that Hudson Yards "is the boldest expression of a new fashion in corporate real estate that buildings and 'space' should be potent weapons in a fight to recruit and retain talented young workers."

Equinox Fitness also operates the world's largest Equinox-branded gym at 35 Hudson Yards.

== Design and reception ==
=== Architectural critiques ===
Kohn Pedersen Fox designed the site's master plan, as well as four individual buildings: 10, 30, and 55 Hudson Yards and the shopping center. Firms and individual architects working on distinct buildings did not meet to produce a uniform aesthetic or review the plans for individual buildings together. Two architects involved in the project, Thomas Woltz and Bill Pedersen, have respectively compared the relationship between the buildings to "mastodons, pineapples, sheds, swizzlesticks and bubble mats" and "elephants dancing".

Justin Davidson, writing for New York in 2018, referred to 10 Hudson Yards as "taller, fatter, and greener" than historical New York City skyscrapers, despite more staid interiors with typical open floor plans and corresponding curtain wall. Davidson later compared Hudson Yards unfavorably to Manhattan West, writing that the Brookfield development "[...] feels like a corner of New York conceived with actual human beings in mind" while Hudson Yards "[...] has aged from a shiny new space station to a disconsolate one".

New York Times architecture critic Michael Kimmelman called Hudson Yards a "gated community" catering to the upper-class, writing: "A relic of dated 2000s thinking, nearly devoid of urban design, it declines to blend into the city grid." The Guardian's architecture and design critic, Oliver Wainwright, said that "the real shock is that it's quite so bad", and that the new buildings represented "ungainly lumps", with the logic of design "presenting a mostly blank frontage of service hatches and lift lobbies to the city".

=== Restaurants and amenities ===
In a review of the restaurant offerings at Hudson Yards written in anticipation of the complex opening to the public, Ryan Sutton criticized Related and Oxford for including only two establishments run by women and for failing to provide opportunities for small, local operators to open in Hudson Yards, instead leasing to restaurateurs and organizations which had already experienced "great success".

When Mercado Little Spain ultimately opened in 2019, Eater published a mixed review of its offerings, written by Robert Sietsema. In a separate review by Sutton of the opened complex, published in 2019, the critic referred to Hudson Yards as "the worst place to eat fancy food in New York".

The Equinox Hotel received a positive review from Vanity Fair in 2022. Samantha Lewis praised the hotel for its emphasis on providing guests with "blissful slumber". The hotel's restaurant, Electric Lemon, has received an "underwhelming" review from Pete Wells.

In September 2023, Florence Fabricant of the New York Times noted that BondSt Hudson Yards, a “hot spot for sushi and celebrities,” was “bigger, grander” and “splashier” than its original location in NoHo. Fabricant went on to review the recently opened Locanda Verde location In November 2024, stating that “new and improved” is “the best way to describe this Hudson Yards location”. The two-story Locande Verde features artwork by Robert De Niro Sr. and is located on street level. Pete Wells included Hudson Yards’ Mercado Little Spain on the New York Times’ 100 Best Restaurants in New York City in 2024 list.

=== Public perception ===
The Hudson Yards development has had mixed public approval. The New York Times questioned if New York City needed another "gated community", which alludes to the premium nature of the development, shops and condominium offerings. Bridget Read wrote for Curbed in 2022 that "the broad public benefit from the largest real-estate development in American history has not yet materialized". A study by The New School found that Hudson Yards had cost city residents an additional $2.2 billion in taxes, even though the project was supposed to have been self-financed. However, by June 2023, the New York City Comptroller found that Hudson Yards significantly increased its contributions to city taxes – "$200 million more a year than we expected.

Comedian Conner O'Malley released a video titled "Hudson Yards Video Game" which was perceived as critical of the project.

Recently, the development's public perception has shifted, with locals commenting that "Hudson Yards had to really change to be geared towards a local population." This involved leaning "into the community idea" by bringing in a barbershop, a cobbler and wine store, and a day spa.

Retailers say the visitor mix today is "a balance among local residents, both American and international tourists, and the office workers who occupy the more than 7 million square feet of commercial real estate at the development."

==== Vendor disputes ====
Street vendors who have legally operated on public property near the development since before its opening allege they have been the targets of harassment from security employed by Related and the NYPD. Related has installed landscaping with the alleged intention of depriving the vendors of adequate space to place their carts. Related first installed new tree pits, leaving space for one cart, and later placed a large planter in the final available space.

After receiving summonses from NYPD officers in May 2021—contravening a policy removing police from enforcing vendor compliance with laws—the vendors organized a protest. This protest was supported by Manhattan Borough President Gale Brewer.

=== Floodplain ===
Hudson Yards sits within Manhattan's 100-year floodplain, and the rail lines have previously been flooded despite preventive measures. Given that the bulk of the new structures would rise from an already elevated platform, the development is above the floodplain, and most mechanical systems are similarly raised. In addition, new elevator pits would be made waterproof.

Klaus Jacob, a professor at Columbia University, has stated approval of the project stems from the "shortsightedness of decision-making" by its developers and the city in the face of impending climate change. In his 2017 novel New York 2140, author Kim Stanley Robinson mentions the inundation of the neighborhood by rising waters.

=== Technology implementation ===
The rail yard development was designed to be technologically advanced, in that the owners would collect all sorts of data within the buildings using sensors and other data-collecting instruments. The innovations included:

- Air quality monitoring
- Heat mapping to track crowd size and energy usage
- Opt-in mobile apps to help collect data about users' health and activities
- Pedestrian and vehicular traffic monitoring
- Sensors collecting data about noise levels and energy and water usage
- Energy savings using a microgrid
- Automated vacuum collection was planned as of 2014, for organic and solid waste collection with an Envac system instead of garbage trucks.

New York University's Center for Urban Science and Progress designed the infrastructure with the developers of Hudson Yards. Fiber loops connected to satellite dishes on rooftops, to transponders, and to two-way radios would create a network covering the 14 acres (6 ha) of open space as well as 17 million square feet (1,600,000 m^{2}) of commercial space. The technology was designed to be adaptable: updates to infrastructure would be performed as new technological advances are made.

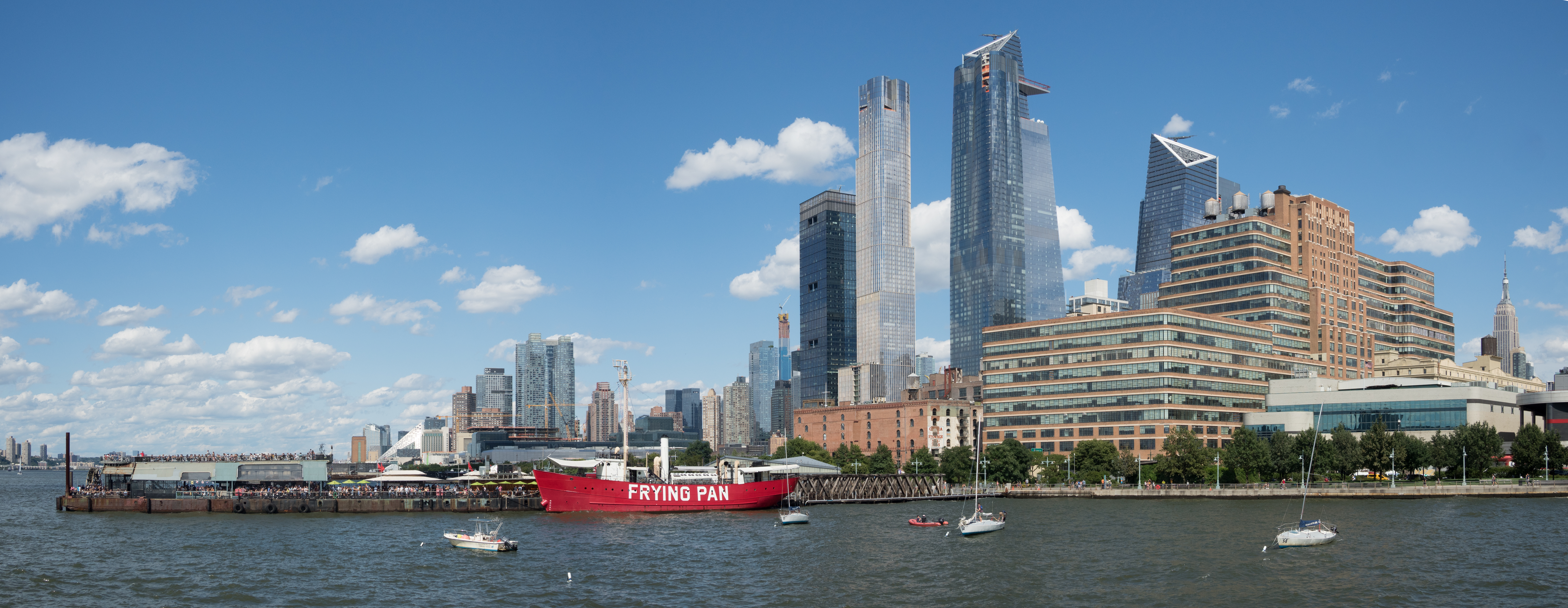
Seen from the Hudson River near North River Pier 66 at 26th Street

== See also ==
- Bridge Apartments, an apartment complex in New York City built over a 12-lane expressway
- Roppongi Hills, a similar large development in Tokyo
