= 74th Street Generating Station =

Steam power plant in Manhattan, New York

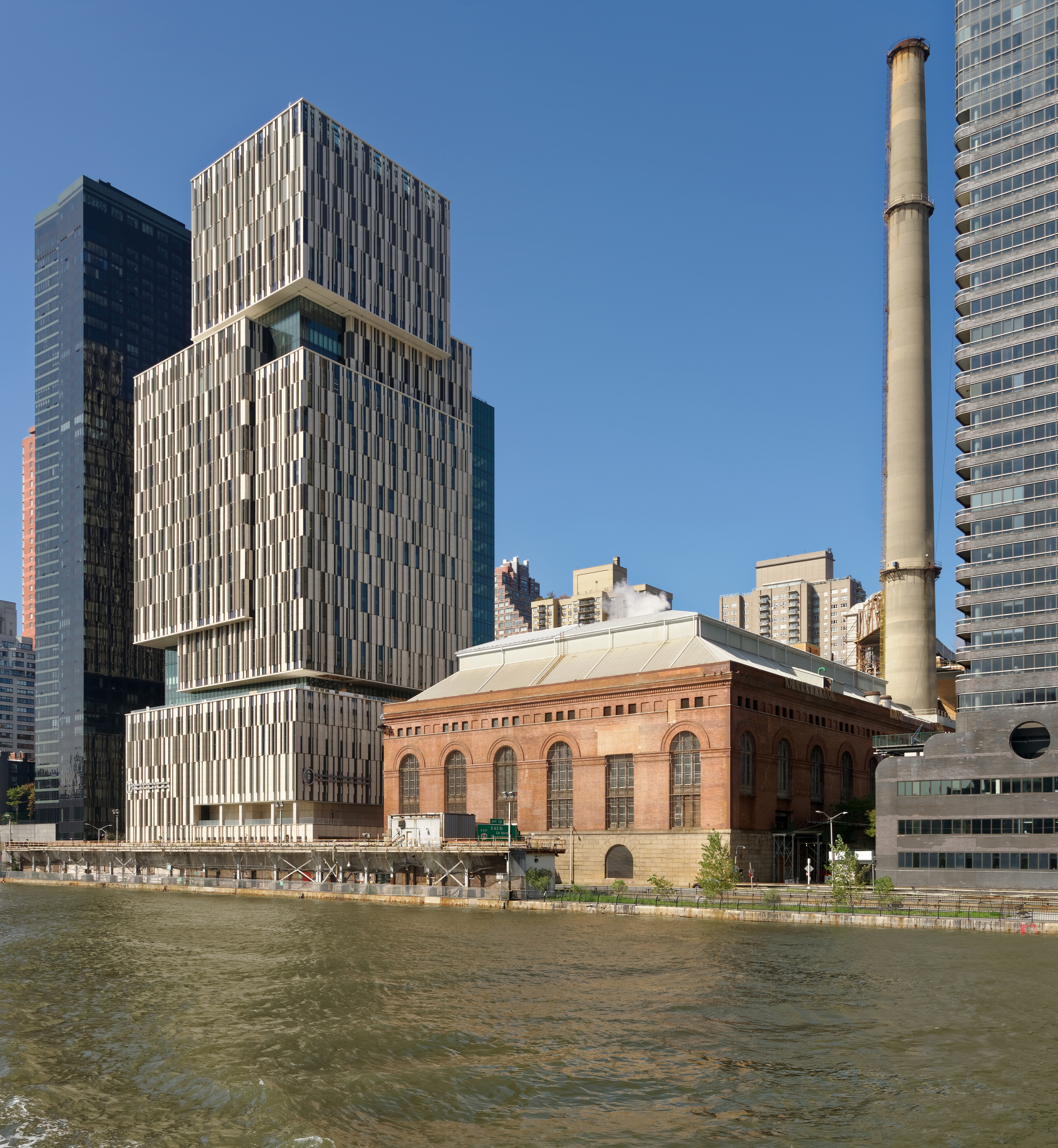
- The power station in 2023

General information
- Location: 503–507 East 74th Street, New York City, United States
- Coordinates: 40°46′5″N 73°57′4″W
- Construction started: 1899
- Opened: 1902
- Owner: Consolidated Edison

Dimensions
- Other dimensions: 500 ft (150 m) (smokestack)

Design and construction
- Developer: Manhattan Railway Company
- Engineer: George H. Pegram
- Other designers: W. E. Baker, E. D. Leavitt, L. B. Stillwell

74th Street Generating Station is a steam power plant located adjacent to the FDR Drive on the Upper East Side of Manhattan in New York City, New York, United States. The plant was originally built by the Manhattan Railway Company as a power station for elevated railways. When it opened in 1902, the facility was one of the largest electrical power plants in the world and contained what are thought to be the largest stationary steam engines ever constructed. The power plant was sold to Consolidated Edison in 1959 and subsequently repurposed to produce steam for the New York City steam system.

== History ==
=== Design and construction ===
In February 1899, Manhattan Railway Company president George J. Gould announced the company's decision to electrify its system of elevated railways, replacing the steam locomotives that were being used to power trains. Four months later Gould announced that the company had acquired a site near the East River between 74th and 75th streets for a new power house to generate the electricity needed for the new system of motive power. The location of the power house was not far away from the theoretical center of gravity of trains operating in the system; it was also situated near a waterway that would facilitate the transport of coal and ash as well as provide a source of cool water for condensing. Over 40 land lots were acquired to assemble the plot of land. The City Real Estate Company made the land acquisitions to avoid making the plans known to the public and affecting land values.

The property had a depth of 204 feet (62 m) with frontages of 588 feet (179 m) on 74th Street and 531 feet (162 m) on 75th Street. The east end of the site bordered Exterior Street, which was a proposed roadway along the riverfront. Most of the land along 75th Street formerly contained the residence, stable and gardens of George Matthews, where his family had lived for three generations. The land along 74th Street had been occupied by a wagon yard and several residences.

Workers began clearing off the property in July 1899 and excavation work commenced the following month. Plans for the construction of a three-story brick and stone power house on the site were filed with the city's Building Department in April 1900. The design of the plant was led by George H. Pegram, chief engineer of the Manhattan Railway Company, with W. E. Baker, E. D. Leavitt and L. B. Stillwell serving as consulting engineers; Baker had supervised the electrical equipment for the Metropolitan West Side Elevated Railroad in Chicago and the West End Street Railway in Boston, Leavitt was an expert in the design of steam engines and Stillwell was the electrical director of the Niagara Falls Power Company.

The power station was designed for a maximum capacity of 100,000 horsepower (75 MW) and could be expanded to a capacity of 150,000 horsepower (110 MW) if needed. The facility originally contained eight 10,000-horsepower reciprocating steam engines, each of which drove an alternator that could generate 7.5 megawatts of electric power in the form of 11,000-volt, three-phase, 25-hertz alternating current. In order to fit the massive engines into the power house, Edwin Reynolds, the chief engineer at Allis-Chalmers, designed a double-compound engine with high-pressure cylinders mounted horizontally and low-pressure cylinders mounted vertically and placed the crank pins at a 135° angle to distribute torque and minimize flywheel requirements. The original engines, which became known as the "Manhattan Engines", are thought to be the largest stationary steam engines ever constructed.

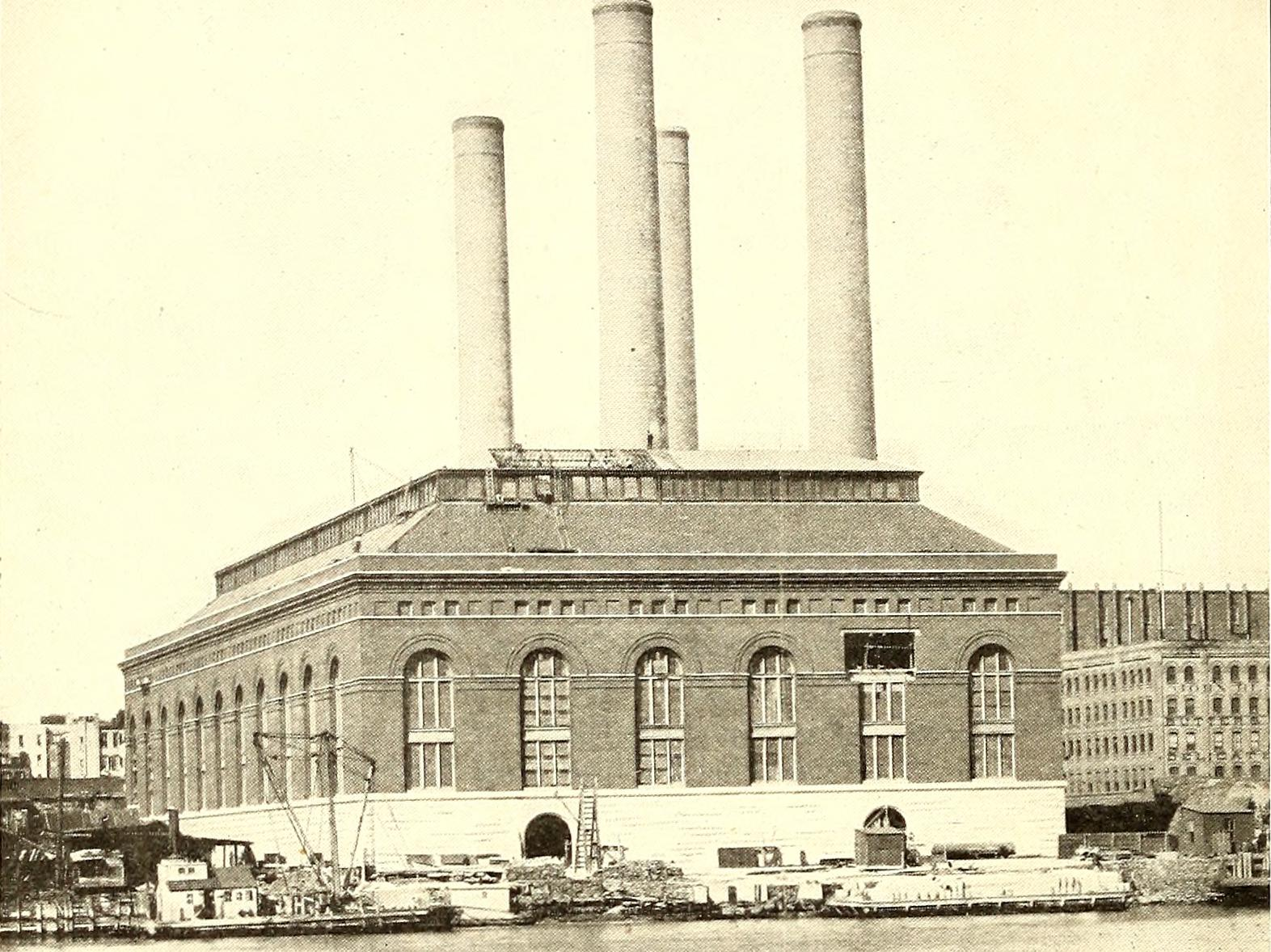
Construction of the power plant nearing completion, prior to erection of the coal and ash tower along the East River bulkhead

Coal for the power station was delivered by barge to a dock on the East River. A coal and ash tower was built along the bulkhead, which was connected to the power house by a bridge located 60 feet (18 m) above street level. Coal conveying machinery could unload vessels at a rate of 150 short tons (140,000 kg) per hour and load the coal bunkers located above the boilers, which had a capacity of 15,000 short tons (14,000,000 kg) and could supply the plant with enough fuel for about twenty days of operation. The plant included 64 Babcock & Wilcox horizontal water-tube boilers equipped with mechanical stokers and 16 economizers. Ashes from the furnaces passed through chutes into the basement and were transported by dump cars to an ash pit at the east end of the building; a bucket conveyor was used to carry the ashes to the coal and ash tower from which ashes were loaded onto barges by gravity. Four smokestacks—each 278 feet (85 m) in height—were provided so that an accident in a stack or the flues connected to it would not require the entire plant to be shut down. Sixteen blowers were used to provide forced draft.

The condensing plant was designed to use jet condensers, but was arranged in a manner so that it could be changed to employ surface condensers in the future. Condensing tunnels were constructed between the plant and the East River; the inlet and outlet tunnels diverged at the east face of the building so their openings at the river were located about 100 feet (30 m) from each other to prevent water discharged from the plant from increasing the temperature of the water near the intake tunnel.

=== Opening and early years ===
Upon completion, the power house was one of the largest electrical power plants in the world. Using power generated by the new plant, the Manhattan Railway Company's first electric train was run along the Second Avenue Elevated on January 9, 1902. After the inaugural trip, many of the invited guests inspected the 74th Street power house. The property on which the power house was located was conveyed from the City Real Estate Company to the Manhattan Railway Company on March 18, 1903. On April 1, 1903, the Interborough Rapid Transit Company (IRT) acquired the Manhattan Railway Company through a lease.

As steam engine technology progressed, the reciprocating steam engines that had been originally installed at the plant began to be replaced by smaller and more efficient steam turbines. Five of the original engines were removed between 1914 and 1918. Three new 30,000-kilowatt low pressure steam turbine units were placed into operation beginning in 1915. A 60,000-kilowatt low pressure steam turbine manufactured by the Westinghouse Electric & Manufacturing Company was placed into operation by 1919, which was capable of producing 70,000 kilowatts (94,000 hp) under maximum load. This was nearly as much power that could be produced by the power plant when it first opened even though the new engine only occupied one quarter of the space that had been taken up by the original eight engines.

The IRT was taken over by the New York City Board of Transportation on June 12, 1940, which was combined with the former Brooklyn-Manhattan Transit (BMT) lines and the Independent Subway System (IND) into a unified subway system (operation of the system was later transferred to the New York City Transit Authority [NYCTA] in 1953). On June 18, 1940, the segment of the East River Drive between 49th and 93rd streets—which included the land between the power house and the river—opened up to motorists.

The power plant was modernized by NYCTA beginning in 1954, which included the construction of new coal and ash handling structures along the waterfront to replace the previous system that was considered to be the weakest link in the plant's operation and had become a maintenance headache. This work also included the addition of an overpass used by workers to safely cross above the FDR Drive between the power house and the waterfront facilities. New buildings were constructed on the west side of the plant to accommodate a 60,000-kilowatt high pressure steam turbine, two new boilers, and new switchgear to begin changing over from a utility frequency of 25-hertz power to 60-hertz power.

=== Sale to Con Edison ===
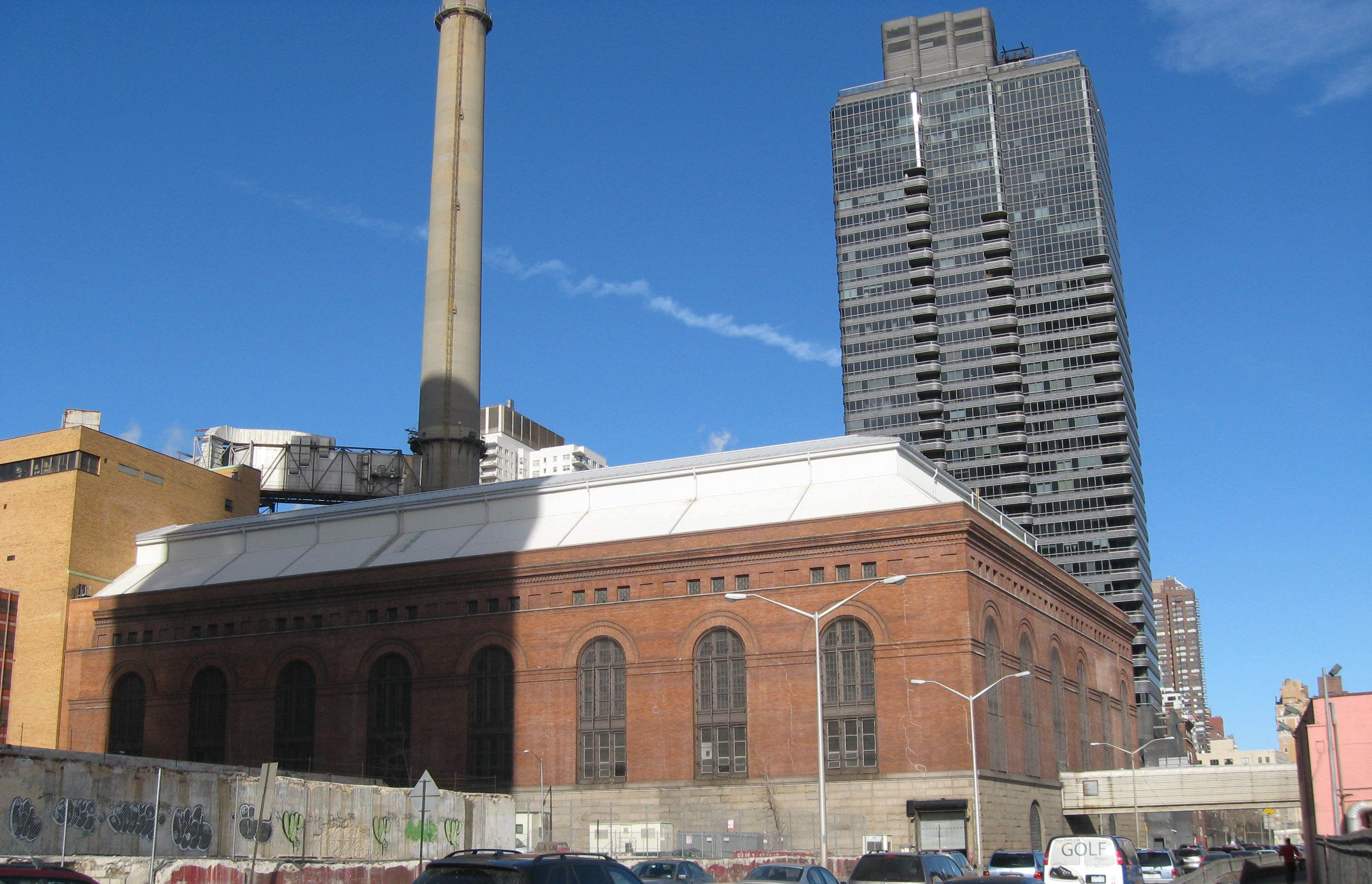
The power house in 2009, showing the ten-story addition on the west side of the original 1902 structure

On May 19, 1959, the power plant was sold to Consolidated Edison (Con Edison) along with two other facilities that were being used to generate electricity for the subway system: the IRT Powerhouse on West 59th Street and the Hudson River in Manhattan and a power plant on Kent Avenue on the East River in Williamsburg, Brooklyn. Under the terms of the sale, workers at the three power plants became employees of Con Edison, and fixed rates were established by which Con Edison would supply electricity to the IRT, BMT and IND subway systems over a ten-year period. Con Edison constructed an addition at the west side of the power house in 1965, which nearly doubled the length of the facility. Two years later, Con Edison installed a single 500-foot (150 m) high smokestack to replace the smaller smokestacks that had been located at the plant; the larger smokestack was installed so it would be located above taller buildings that had been constructed in the surrounding area.

In September 1978, the 74th Street Generating Plant was used as a testing ground for synthetic liquified coal when over 4,000 barrels (170,000 US gal) of SRC-II fuel supplied by the United States Department of Energy were burned to generate electricity in contract with the Electric Power Research Institute. The goal of the research was to determine the practicality of using liquified coal as an alternative fuel, reducing the country's dependence on using foreign oil.

During the December 1992 nor'easter, flooding at the 74th Street Generating Station and the IRT Powerhouse on West 59th Street cut off the power supply to the signals used by the IRT and BMT subway systems. The signals were still operating on 25-hertz alternating current that was only being supplied by the two power stations, both of which had transformers located only four feet (1.2 m) above street level. On the morning of June 28, 1996, a five-alarm fire broke out on the fourth floor of the ten-story addition to the 74th Street Generating Plant, which took five and a half hours to bring under control. The blaze was started when wood framing that had been erected around a boiler as part of an asbestos removal program was ignited by high temperatures from a nearby steam line.

By 2013, the facility was capable of producing up to 2,008,000 pounds (911,000 kg) of steam per hour—which was generated by three high-pressure boilers and six package boilers—as well as about 40 MW of electricity generated from two gas turbines. The boilers used for steam production for the New York City steam system burned fuel oil, but were undergoing a conversion to use natural gas as a fuel source and reduce emissions, which was completed later that year.

== Architecture ==
The design of the original power station was dictated by mechanical requirements and divided longitudinally by an interior wall that separated a boiler house running along the north side of the building from an engine house that ran along the building's south side. The base of the building was constructed with a rusticated water table clad with pink granite. The upper portion of the facade was clad in fire-flashed brown bricks containing metallic spotting and was decorated with reliefs including molded brick, a stringcourse and a denticulated cornice. Arched windows, 14-foot-wide (4.3 m) by 45-foot-high (14 m), were placed along the brick facades. The roof was covered with red vitrified tile and topped with copper-faced monitors; the smokestacks were painted buff.

By 2012, the inside of the original power house was nearly half-empty following the removal of generators from the former engine house. Christopher Gray of The New York Times described the building's interior as "an industrial-grade Grand Canyon" with a space that "soars like the interior of Grand Central, but in work clothes instead of fancy dress." He also described the brickwork on the building's facade as having a "marmaladelike orange" appearance.

== See also ==
- Substation 7 – a traction substation built by the Manhattan Railway Company to convert electricity generated by the 74th Street power station
