= Edwin Reynolds =

Edwin Reynolds may refer to:

- Edwin R. Reynolds (1816–1908), U.S. Representative from New York.
- Edwin Reynolds (engineer) (1831–1909), American mechanical engineer, consulting engineer and inventor
- Edwin Francis Reynolds (1875–1949), English architect
