= Ravenswood Nuclear Power Plant =

Proposed nuclear power plant in New York City

- Country: United States
- Location: Long Island City, New York
- Coordinates: 40°45′35″N 73°56′45″W
- Construction began: Never built
- Construction cost: $175 million (1962)
- Operator: Consolidated Edison

Nuclear power station
- Reactor type: PWR
- Reactor supplier: Westinghouse

Power generation
- Units planned: 750 MW, with oil superheat to 1000 MW
- Nameplate capacity: 1,000 MW; 750 MW

The Ravenswood Nuclear Power Plant was proposed in 1962 by the Consolidated Edison (Con Ed) electric utility for the Ravenswood Generating Station site in Long Island City, New York. To be completed in 1970, the facility was to be the largest nuclear power installation in the world at that time, with a generating capacity exceeding the total of all nuclear power facilities in the United States then operating. After encountering opposition from local residents and the city of New York, and in the face of skepticism concerning safety from the Atomic Energy Commission, the proposal was withdrawn in 1964.

== Project history and cancellation ==
In 1962 Consolidated Edison proposed a nuclear reactor for the site of the then-new coal-powered Ravenswood Generating Station in Long Island City. The nuclear facility was intended to alleviate costs associated with stockpiling coal at the location, and to avoid costs for long transmission lines from outside the city. At 750 megawatts (MW), boosted to 1000 MW with oil superheat, it would have been the largest nuclear power facility in the United States at the time. The site, directly across the East River from Manhattan, was in 1963 surrounded by a daytime population of five million people within 5 miles (8.0 km).

The project was met with immediate opposition from residents and from the Queens borough president Mario J. Cariello at a February 19, 1963 meeting in Queens at St. Rita's Roman Catholic Church. The same month the Committee Against Nuclear Power Plants was organized to oppose the project, followed by the Committee for a Safe New York. Although Con Ed's chairman Harland C. Forbes testified to Congress that concerns were "rather silly," former chairman of the Atomic Energy Commission (AEC) David E. Lilienthal told the committee that he would "not dream of living in the borough of Queens if there was a large atomic power plant in that region..." Con Ed noted that the existing conventional power station at Ravenswood was a source of air pollution, and that locating nuclear generation outside the city would increase costs for transmission lines. In June 1963 the New York City Council heard testimony for and against the facility. The same month a bill was introduced in the council to prohibit industrial nuclear reactors in the city.

On August 6, a New York Times editorial asserted that Con Ed had failed to make a case for siting a nuclear facility in the heart of a metropolitan area. Lilienthal's remarks drew opposition from sitting AEC chairman Glenn T. Seaborg, stating that he would "not fear having my family reside within the vicinity of a modern nuclear power plant built and operated under our regulations and controls." Seaborg's comments were echoed by what Lilienthal called a "truth squad" of industry and academic figures. However, in August the AEC's Safety Committee sent Con Ed questions about the proposal, noting that the AEC's standards were based on an unpopulated area for a 1-mile (1.6 km) radius around a nuclear plant, and a low population density within 16 miles (26 km). Further analysis within the AEC indicated that Con Ed's proposed containment system could not be credibly assumed to be sufficient to contain either a maximum credible accident or a worst conceivable accident without release of fission products, having lost the value of physical isolation from the surroundings and instead relying solely on containment. This conclusion was informally conveyed to Con Ed. At the same time the AEC Safeguards Committee expressed its own doubts about reliance on containment, in view of what committee member Franklin Gifford termed the "lousy" site. Other committee members felt that Con Ed's assumptions concerning fission product release were unrealistic.

On January 6, 1964, Con Ed withdrew the application, stating that they had arranged for the purchase of cheaper hydroelectric power from Canada from the proposed Churchill Falls Generating Station, completed 1971-1974. However, the economic analysis for power from Canada neglected the cost of transmission lines.

In 1968 another nuclear facility was proposed, this one an underground facility on the southern end of Roosevelt Island, even closer to Manhattan. This too was not pursued. A 1970 Con Ed proposal posited two nuclear facilities on artificial islands several miles offshore from Coney Island and Staten Island with a combined capacity of four gigawatts. After these proposals were met with opposition, Con Ed observed an informal agreement that no nuclear facilities would be built closer to New York than the Indian Point Energy Center in Buchanan.

== Design ==
The facility was intended to have an effective capacity of 1000 megawatts (MW_{e}), using a Westinghouse 750 MW_{e} pressurized water reactor and two oil-fired superheaters, at a cost in 1964 of $175 million. Con Ed's siting decision was influenced by the cost of new electrical transmission lines, and by the cost and need to stockpile coal at the Ravenswood thermal plant location against possible labor strikes. Con Ed proposed a concrete containment structure 150 feet (46 m) in diameter and 175 feet (53 m) tall, 7 feet (2.1 m) thick, with an outer shell 5.5 feet (1.7 m) thick. The space between the inner and outer shells was to contain two .25-inch (0.64 cm) steel shells 2 feet (61 cm) apart, with the intervening space filled with low-density pervious concrete, to be maintained at a lower-than-atmospheric pressure.

== See also ==
- Shoreham Nuclear Power Plant
