= New York City steam system =

District heating system in New York City

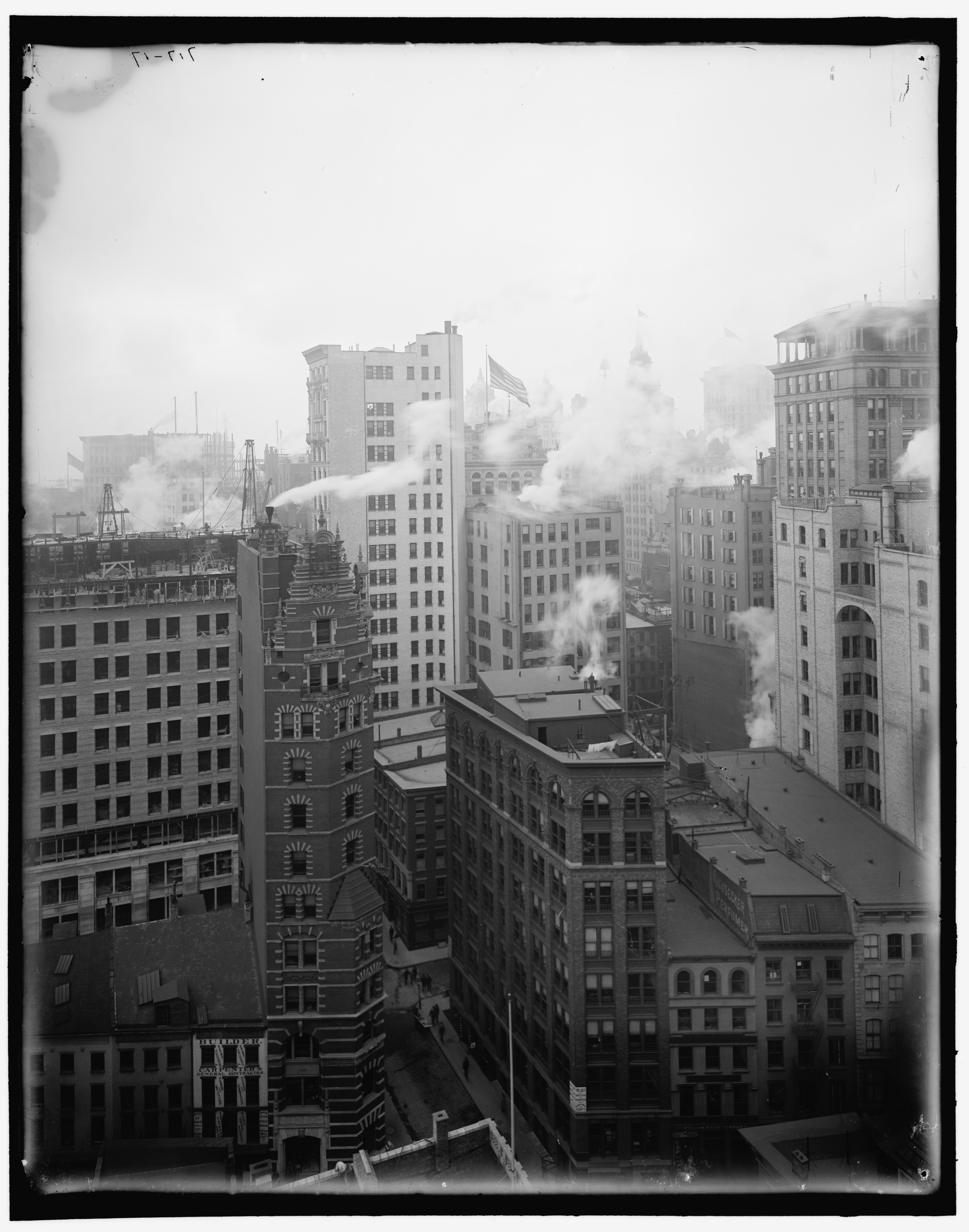
Steam vapor visible above the buildings on William Street between Maiden Lane and Liberty Street in New York City in the early 20th century

The New York City steam system includes Con Edison's Steam Operations, a piped steam system which provides steam to large parts of Manhattan. Other smaller systems provide steam to New York University and Columbia University, and many individual buildings in New York City also have their own steam systems. The steam is used to heat and cool buildings and for cleaning and disinfecting. It is the largest such system in the world and has been in operation since 1882.

== Con Edison's Steam Operations ==
Con Edison's Steam Operations is a first generation district heating system which carries steam from generating stations under the streets to heat and cool buildings and businesses in Manhattan. Some New York City businesses and facilities also use steam for cleaning and disinfection.

The New York Steam Company began providing service in lower Manhattan on March 3, 1882. By 1932, the company supplied steam to over 2,500 buildings from six steam plants, including its massive Kips Bay Station on the East River near Midtown Manhattan. It also had an agreement to obtain steam from the New York Edison Company's Waterside and Fourteenth Street electric power plants during periods of peak demand for steam, such as in the morning on days with cold temperatures.

Con Edison Steam Plant Locations
1 74th Street Station
2 60th Street Station
3 59th Street Station
4 East River Station
5 BNYCP Plant
6 Ravenswood Station

The New York Steam Company merged with Consolidated Edison on March 8, 1954. Today, Con Edison operates the largest commercial steam system in the world (larger than the next nine combined). The organization within Con Edison responsible for the system's operation, known as Steam Operations, provides steam service to over 1,700 commercial and residential customers in Manhattan from Battery Park to 96th Street uptown on the west side, and 89th Street on the east side of Manhattan. Roughly 27 billion pounds (12,000,000 t) of steam flow through the system every year. The steam is produced at four plants in Manhattan and one each in Brooklyn and Queens; the primary plant is between 14th and 15th streets on Manhattan's east side:

- 74th Street Station (at FDR Drive)
- 60th Street Station (at York Ave.)
- 59th Street Station (at 11th Ave.)
- East River Generating Station (14th St. and FDR Drive) (cogeneration)
- BNYCP Plant (Brooklyn Navy Yard Cogeneration Partners)
- Ravenswood "A" House Steam Station (Queens)

These plants boil water from the New York City water supply system, making Con Edison one of the largest users of the municipal water supply system.

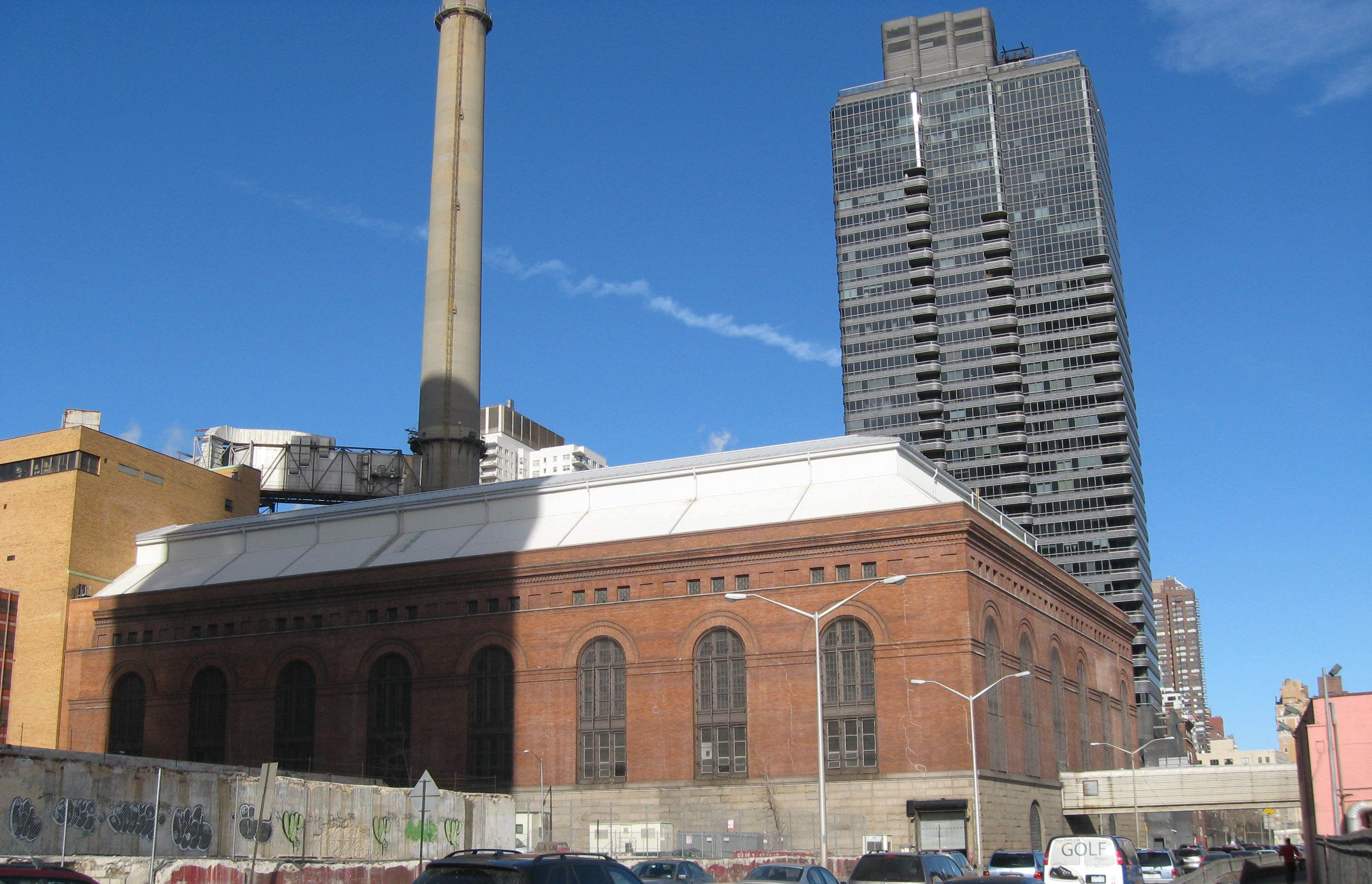
74th Street Station

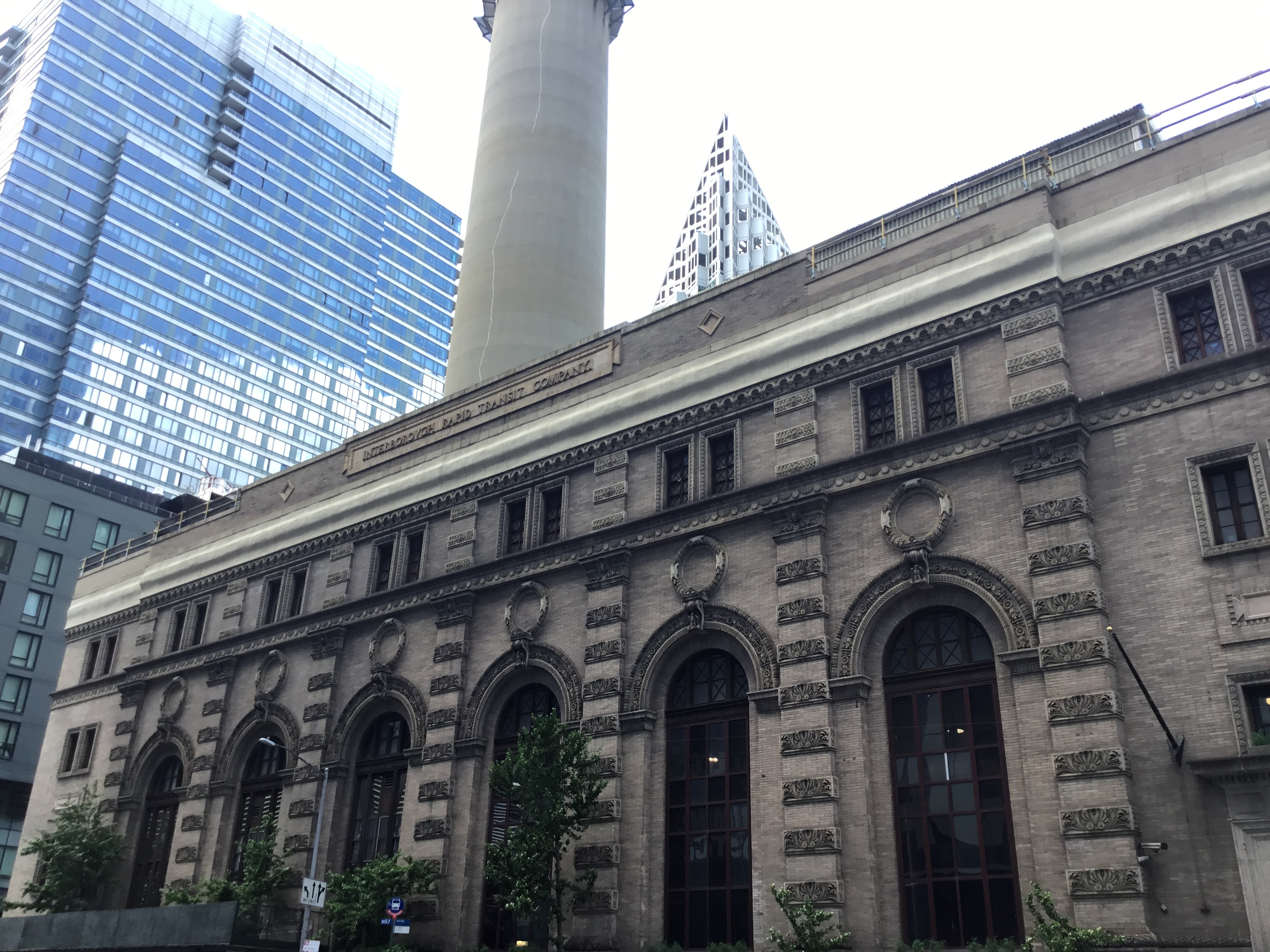
59th Street Station

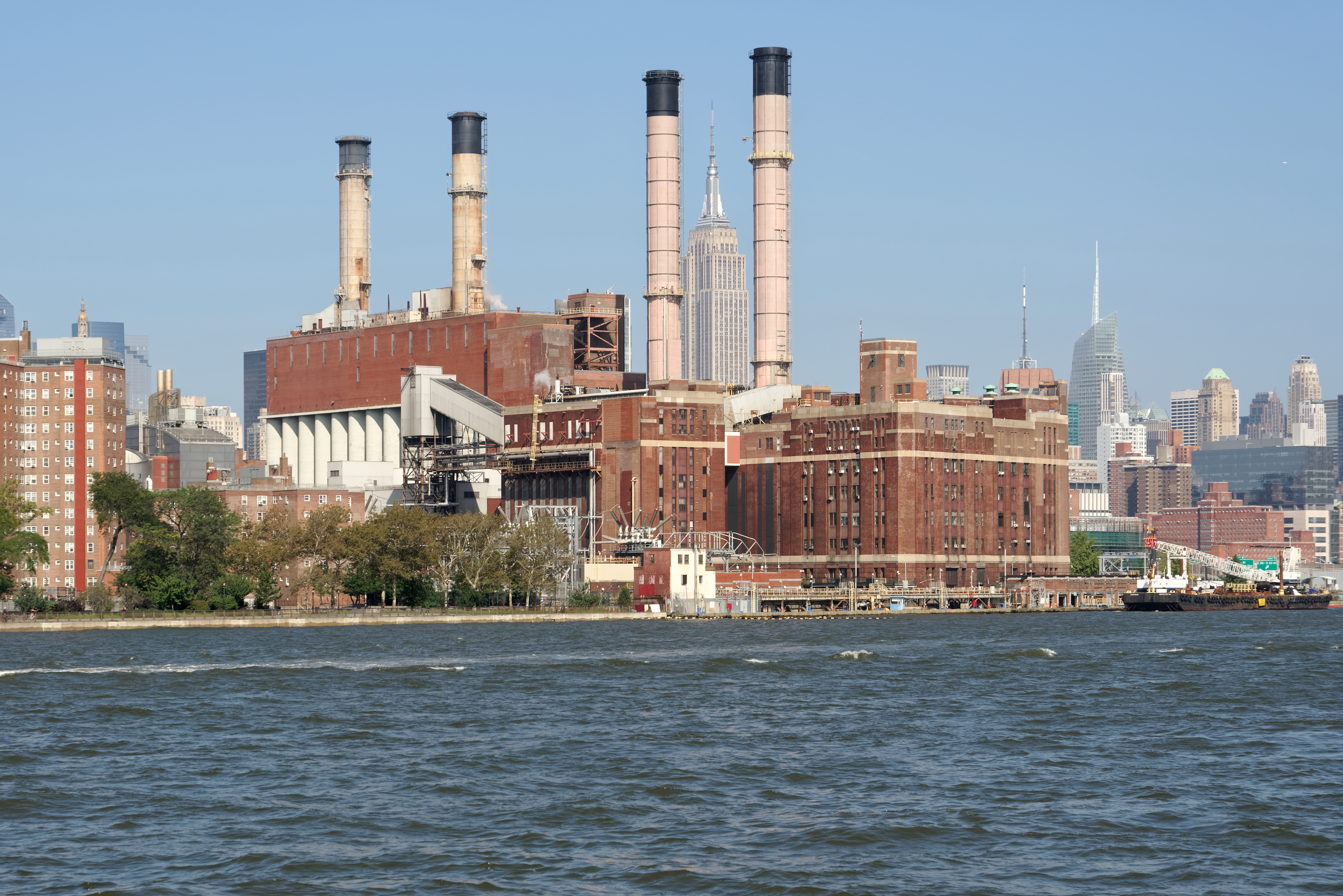
East River Station

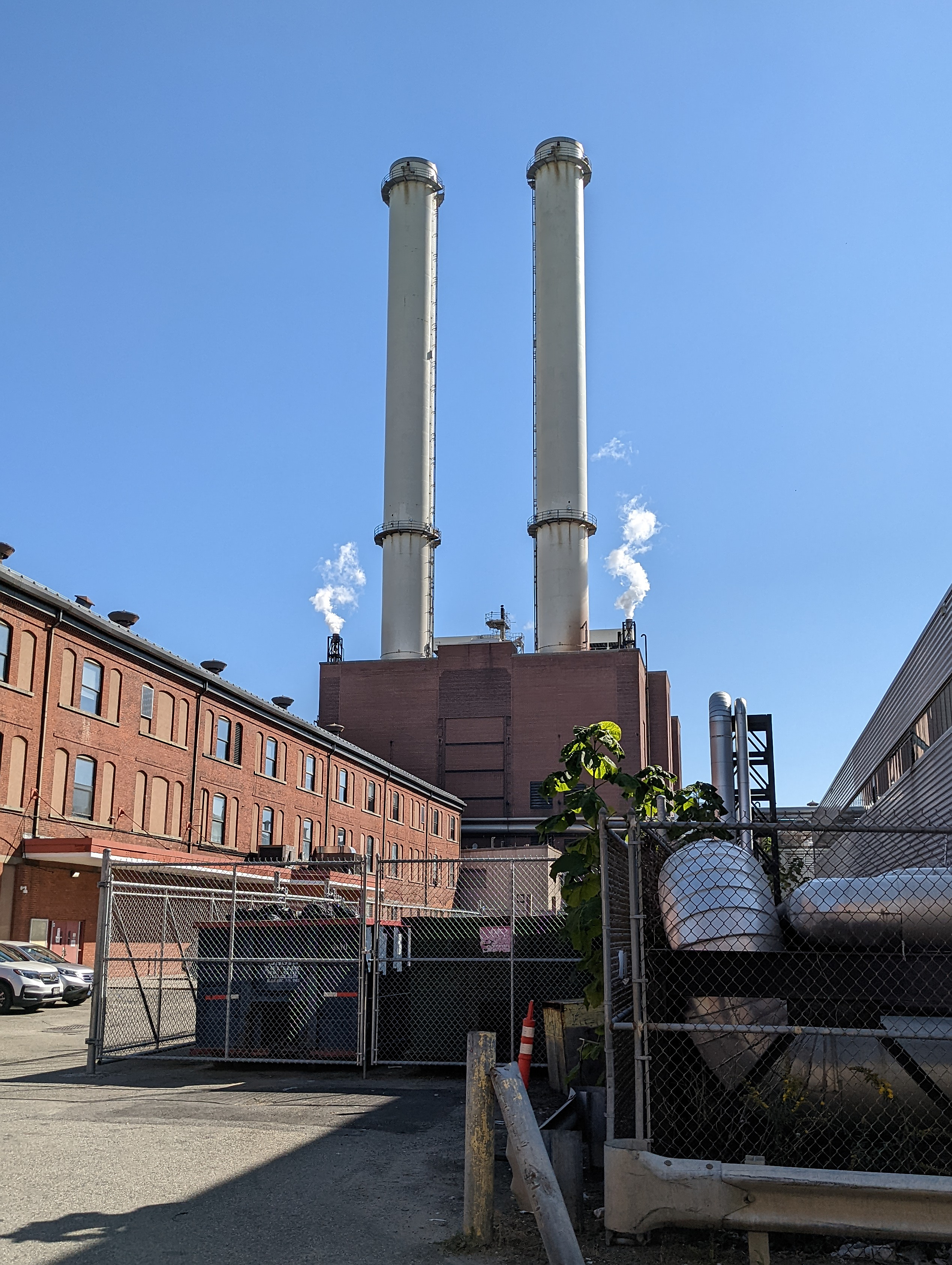
BNYCP Plant

== Uses ==
Steam provides heat and cooling to many buildings in New York. Cooling is performed through the use of chillers, which utilize steam in vapor compression or absorption refrigeration to chill a coolant, which is then circulated throughout the building to devices such as air handling units and fan coil units. The steam system also provides humidity to art museums, steam cleaning for restaurants to clean dishes, and other uses.

== Environmental effects ==
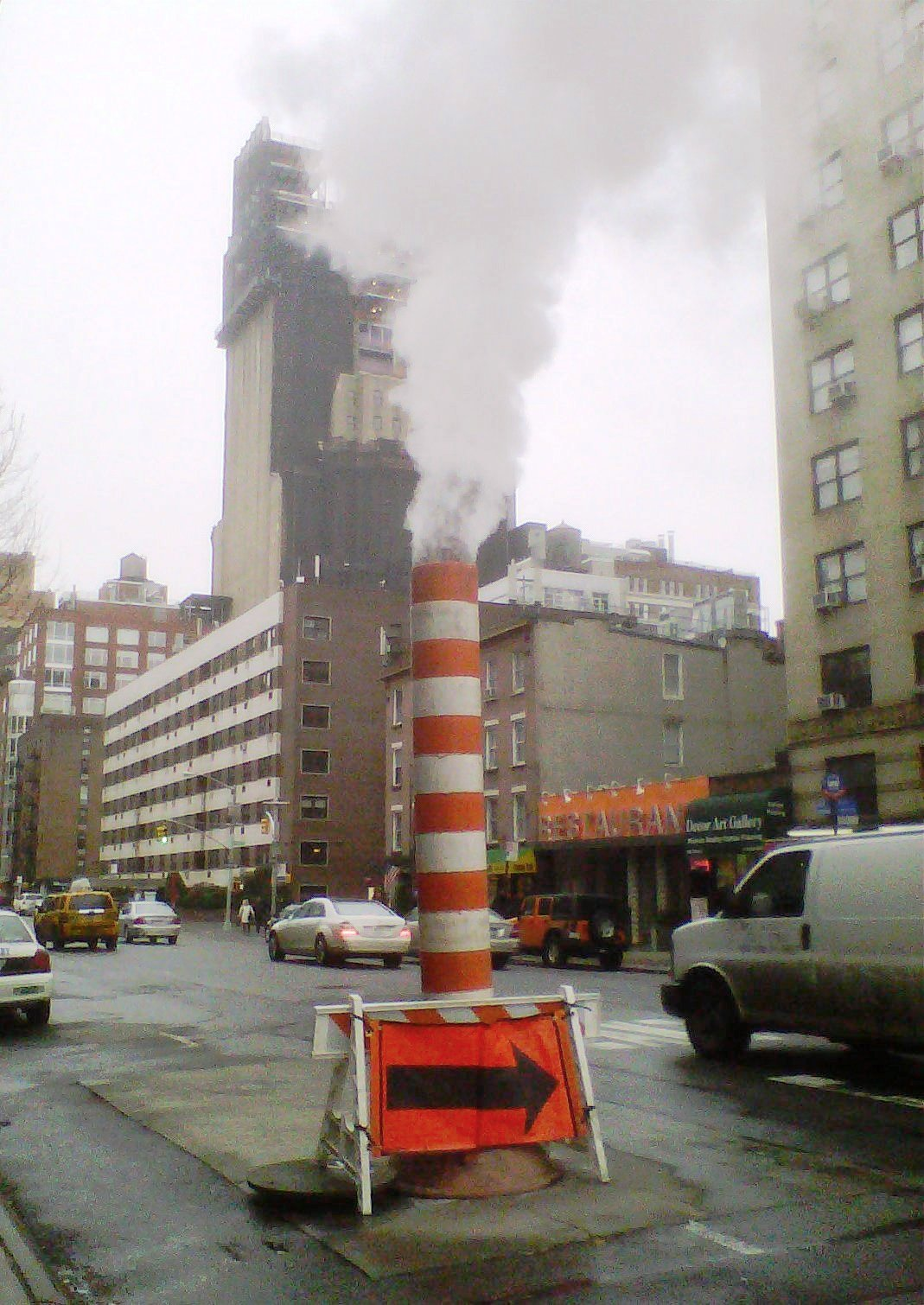
Steam vapor being vented through a typical Con Edison orange and white stack on Seventh Avenue at 20th Street

Approximately 30% of the ConEd steam system's installed capacity and 50% of the annual steam generated comes from cogeneration. Cogeneration and Heat Recovery Steam Generation (HRSG) significantly increase the fuel efficiency of cogenerated electricity and thereby reduce the emission of pollutants, such as NOx, sulfur dioxide, carbon dioxide, and particulate matter, as well as the city's carbon footprint. Con Edison is promoting the use of steam for cooling in the summer months, something that can be accomplished with the installation of absorption chillers. Such trigeneration systems reduce peak electrical loads and save construction costs associated with expanding electrical infrastructure.

Steam vapor can be caused by a leak in Con Ed's steam system or by cooler water contacting the outside of a steam pipe. The vapor is often vented out through 10-foot (3.0 m) orange-and-white funnels vented from manholes in the street, known as stacks. Over the years, the stacks have been depicted in numerous TV shows and films.

At least twelve steam pipe explosions have occurred in New York City since 1987. The most recent major incident was the 2018 steam pipe explosion which occurred in the Flatiron District and forced the evacuation of 49 buildings. The explosion released concrete, asphalt, "asbestos-containing material" and mud into the air. The asbestos was cleaned out of the air to a safe level. A previous incident was the 2007 New York City steam explosion, and another on June 28, 1996, at the 74th Street Generating Station.

A person was also killed by steam in the underground system after falling through a manhole in 2002.

A woman was killed by steam after falling into a manhole while stepping out of a car in Manhattan in 2026.

== See also ==
- Cogeneration
- District heating
- 2007 New York City steam explosion
- Pneumatic tube mail in New York City
