= Ravenswood Generating Station =

Power station in Queens, New York City

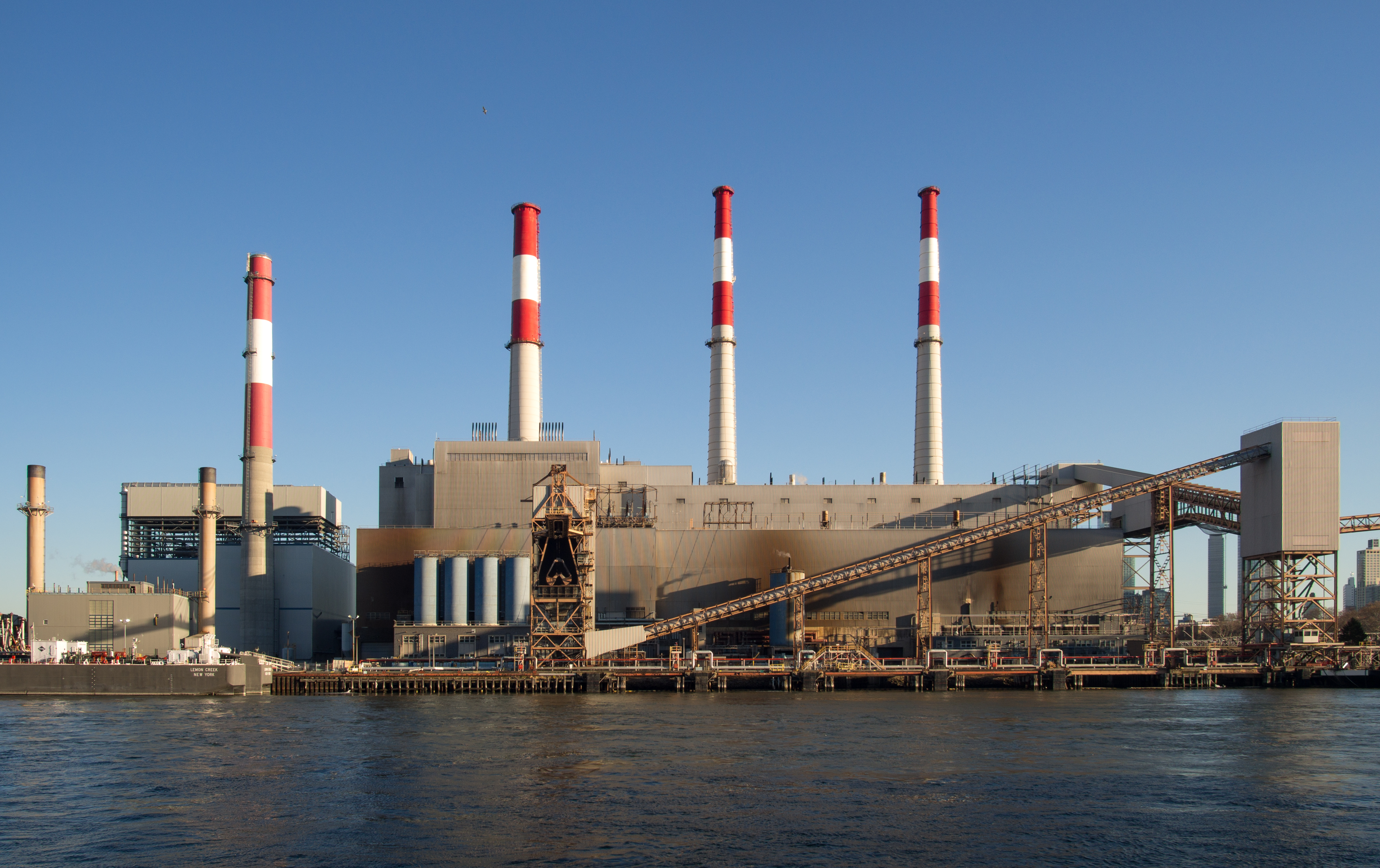
- Ravenswood Generating Station in 2017
- Country: United States
- Location: Long Island City, Queens, New York City
- Coordinates: 40°45′35″N 73°56′45″W
- Status: Operational
- Commission date: 1963
- Owner: L.S Power
- Operator: IHI Power Services

Thermal power station
- Primary fuel: Fuel Oil, Natural Gas
- Secondary fuel: Fuel Oil, Natural Gas
- Turbine technology: Steam turbine, Gas turbine
- Combined cycle?: Yes (Unit 40)

Power generation
- Units operational: 5
- Units cancelled: 2 × 500 MW PWR
- Nameplate capacity: 2,480 MW

External links
- Commons: Related media on Commons

Ravenswood Generating Station is a 2,480 megawatt power plant in Long Island City in Queens, New York City, owned and operated by LS Power/Helix Energy Solutions Group. Originally fuelled by coal, the plant has been fueled primarily by fuel oil (no. 6) and natural gas since 1971. An early proposal included a nuclear power reactor on the site.

== History ==
Ravenswood was originally built and owned by Consolidated Edison of New York Inc. (Con Edison) in 1963. The first two units constructed in 1963 were Ravenswood 10 and 20, each having a generating capacity of approximately 385 megawatts. Then, in 1965, Ravenswood 30 (commonly called "Big Allis") was commissioned with a generating capacity of nearly 981 megawatts. A new 1,000 MW unit was originally planned to be located on the north side of the East River Generating Station in Manhattan, but after test borings revealed the presence of poor subsurface rock conditions, Con Edison decided to instead install the new unit at the Ravenswood Generating Station. In the 1970s, multiple combustion turbine units were installed in a simple cycle configuration to meet peak power demands. The facility used coal fuel until 1971.

Due to deregulation of the energy markets in New York State, Con Edison was required to sell all of its "in-city" generating stations in New York City including Ravenswood. In 1999, Con Edison transferred ownership of Ravenswood to KeySpan Energy for $597 million. In 2004, KeySpan constructed a new unit, Ravenswood 40, using combined cycle technology with generating capacity of 250 megawatts.

National Grid plc acquired KeySpan in 2007 but due to its involvement in electrical transmission the New York Public Service Commission required National Grid to sell Ravenswood to ensure competition in the market. On August 26, 2008, Ravenswood was sold by National Grid to TransCanada Corporation for $2.9 billion. TransCanada later sold Ravenswood to LS Power/Helix Energy Solutions Group in a package deal also including the Ironwood, Ocean State and Kibby Wind facilities for a total price of US$2.1 Billion. In 2018, Helix Generation LLC filed a lawsuit against TransCanada Facility USA Inc. for allegedly fraudulently misleading Helix prior to the sale.

In 2019, it was announced that a 316 MW battery storage system would be built at the Ravenswood Generating Station. The system would be the largest in New York state and would be built in three phases, the first of which would be complete in 2021.

== Description ==
Ravenswood is located in Long Island City in Queens, New York, across from Roosevelt Island. The site is connected to the New York City electrical system through the 138 kV Vernon substation and the 345 kV Rainey substation. It is capable of producing 2,480 MW of electric power. The generating station has three 499-foot-tall (152 m) smokestacks and one 400-foot-tall (120 m) smokestack.

Unit	Approximate Power	First Operated	Power Source
10	380 MW	1963	No.6 Fuel (Primary fuel) / Natural Gas (Secondary Fuel)
20	380 MW	1963	No.6 Fuel (Primary fuel) / Natural Gas (Secondary Fuel)
30	990 MW	1965	No.6 Fuel (Primary fuel) / Natural Gas (Secondary Fuel)
40	250 MW	2004	Natural Gas (Primary Fuel) / No.2 Fuel (Secondary)
Peaking Gas Turbines	400 MW	Various	Natural Gas

The site also includes a steam generation plant consisting of four Babcock & Wilcox boilers, owned and run by Con Edison. The plant helps in the supply of steam to the Manhattan steam system when needed, via the Ravenswood Tunnel under the East River.

=== Ravenswood No. 3 ===
Ravenswood No. 3, also known as Unit 30 or Big Allis, is a natural gas facility at Ravenswood Generating Station owned by LS Power and operated by IHI Corporation Energy Services. During 1963, Allis-Chalmers announced that ConEd had ordered the "world's first MILLION-KILOWATT unit...big enough to serve 3,000,000 people." This sheer scale helped the plant become popularly known as "Big Allis", due to Allis-Chalmers' role in construction. During the Northeast blackout of 1965, the bearings of the Allis-Chalmers Turbine were damaged. The lube oil pumps were hooked up to the electrical grid and thus shut down during the blackout, causing bearing damage.

At the time of its installation, it was the world's largest steam energy generating facility. It is located on the Ravenswood site, consisting of Units 1, 2, 3 and 4, as well as several small gas turbines (GTs), and an oil depot. The site overall produces about 2,500 MW, or approximately 20% of New York City's current energy consumption. In 2011, Big Allis burned 97% natural gas, 3% oil (used as backup fuels).

== Nuclear power proposal ==
A 750MW_{e} nuclear reactor was proposed in 1962, to begin operation on the site in 1970, but was cancelled in 1964 due to controversy and safety concerns. The total capacity was to be augmented to 1000MW_{e} with oil-fired superheaters.

== See also ==
- List of largest power stations in the United States
- New York energy law
