= East River Generating Station =

Power station in Manhattan, New York, US

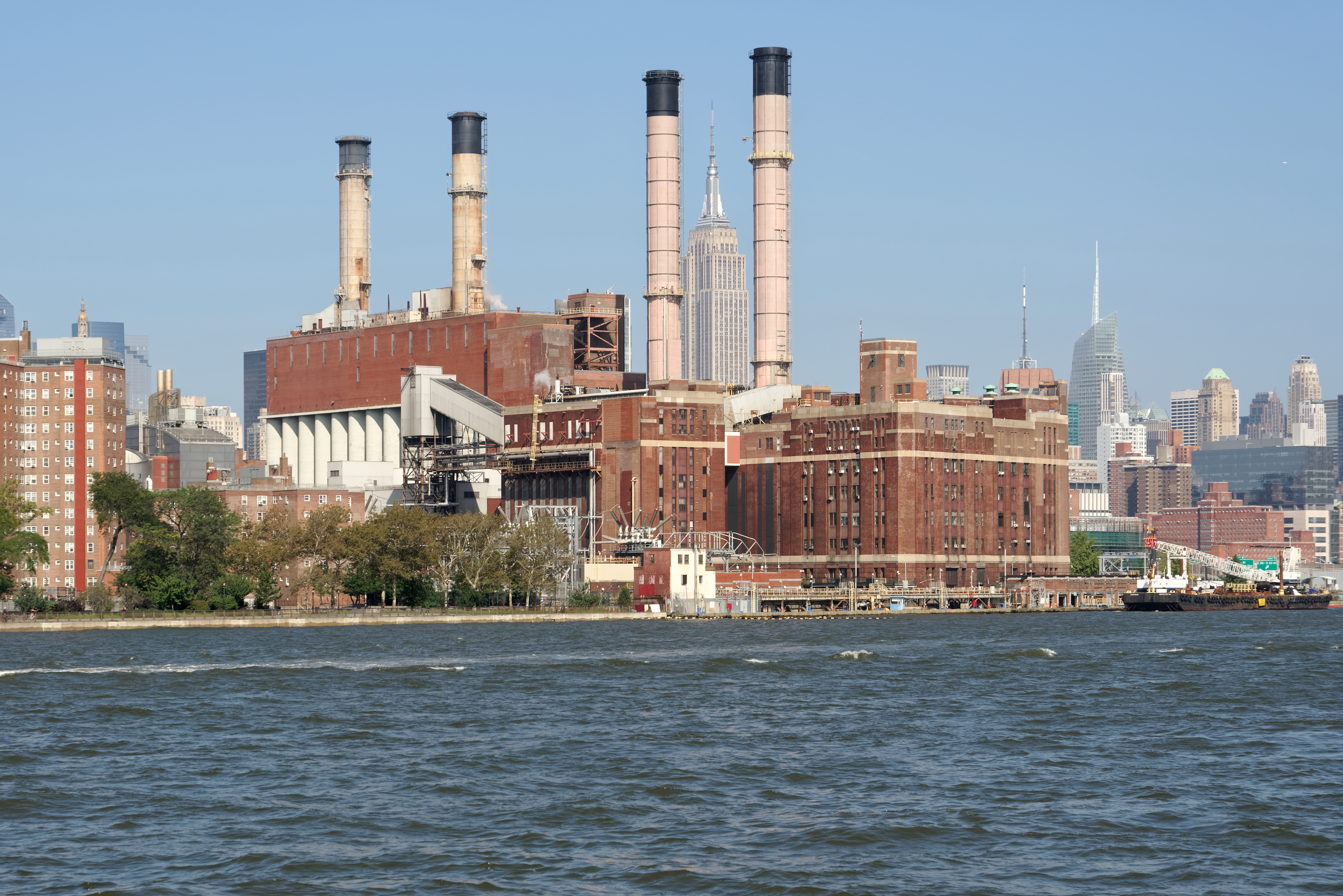
- View from the East River in 2023
- Country: United States
- Location: Manhattan, New York City
- Coordinates: 40°43′41″N 73°58′26″W
- Status: Operational
- Commission date: November 23, 1926
- Owner: Consolidated Edison

Thermal power station
- Primary fuel: Natural gas
- Secondary fuel: Fuel oil
- Turbine technology: Gas turbine, Steam turbine
- Chimneys: 4
- Cooling source: East River
- Combined cycle?: Yes
- Cogeneration?: Yes

Power generation
- Units operational: 4
- Nameplate capacity: 680 MW (2013)

External links
- Commons: Related media on Commons

East River Generating Station is a power plant located near the East River at the eastern end of East 14th Street, adjacent to the East Village and Stuyvesant Town–Peter Cooper Village neighborhoods in Manhattan, New York City, United States. Constructed by New York Edison Company, the plant began operating in 1926. It was later expanded in the 1950s and underwent a repowering project in the early 2000s. The cogeneration facility supplies both electricity and steam—it provides electric power to most parts of Manhattan located south of 36th Street and is the primary plant for the New York City steam system, supplying over half of the system's total capacity.

== History ==
=== Background and planning ===
In 1924, the New York Edison Company determined that a new power station would be needed to accommodate the demand on its 25-hertz system, with the center of the electrical load situated on the southern half of Manhattan. The site selected for the new power plant was located on the East River between East 14th and 15th streets, adjoining property owned by the Consolidated Gas Company. The waterfront site would enable large coal-carrying vessels to dock adjacent to the facility and also allow for a westward expansion to Avenue C for a plant with an approximate footprint measuring 1,100 feet (340 m) long by 200 feet (61 m) wide. Facilities for coal handling and storage as well as a mill house were to be located on the block bounded by Avenue D, the East River, and East 13th and 14th streets. The new power station was designed by Thomas E. Murray along with engineers from the New York Edison Company.

Plans for a 335-by-206-foot (102 by 63 m) power house located on the east side of Avenue D between East 14th and 15th streets were filed by the New York Edison Company with the Buildings Department in 1924. The company publicly announced its plans to construct the new power station in May 1925, explaining that it was designed to meet the increased demand for electricity expected within the next five years from population growth. Plans for the new facility called for nine generators capable of generating a total of 700 MW of electricity. A contract to build the first two generators was awarded to the General Electric Company; the 1,182,500-pound (536,400 kg) units were too large to ship and had to be assembled on site. When operating at full capacity, the plant would require 800,000 US gallons (3,000,000 L) of water per minute for steam condensing, which was double the amount that could be supplied by the city's water supply system via the Catskill Aqueduct. For this reason, the power station was designed to use water supplied from the East River.

Construction of the power plant was opposed by local residents and businesses, who described the facility as a "super-nuisance" that would generate smoke, cinders, ashes and soot as well as block development of the waterfront for recreational purposes. New York Edison Company countered that it was the only public utility company in the world that washed gases before they exited the smokestacks and that their complaints related to air pollution were caused by watercraft and other buildings that burned coal. An editorial appearing in The New York Times acknowledged that it was likely too late in the process to block construction of the power plant, but called for better control of the waterfront to prevent additional industrial and institutional structures from being erected along the East River.

To accommodate future expansion of the planned power plant, the New York Edison Company submitted an application to the Board of Estimate to close the portion of Avenue D between East 14th and 15th streets; this street segment was identified as being "closed and discontinued" on the city map by March 1926.

=== Construction and opening ===
The first electrical components for the new plant were shipped by barge from Albany, New York, and docked adjacent to the site on May 21, 1926; the equipment included rotating parts for a frequency changer to convert electricity from 25 hertz to 60 hertz. On August 2, 1926, two cranes were used to place the first generator into the plant while the components for the second generator were being constructed at the General Electric facility in Schenectady, New York. The plant was placed into operation on November 23, 1926, by Queen Marie of Romania, who ceremoniously switched on the plant's first 60 MW steam turbine, which at the time was the largest single unit of the New York Edison Company and was capable of generating more than three times the amount of electricity used in all of Romania. Later that day Queen Marie toured the company's Waterside Generating Station on First Avenue and East 38th Street to provide contrast with its new power plant at East 14th Street. The second steam turbine, also having a capacity of 60 MW, was placed into operation by the following year.

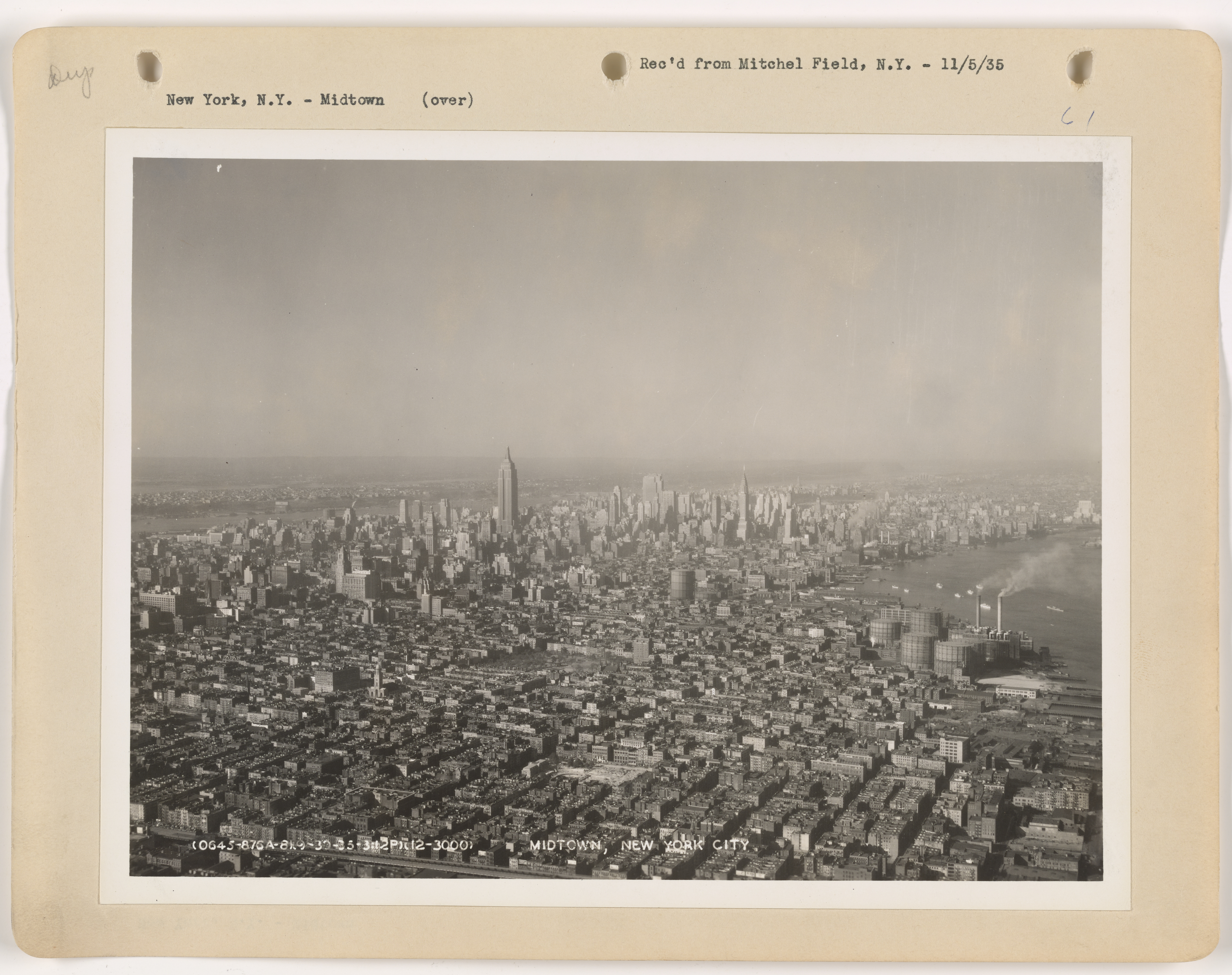
Aerial view of Manhattan in 1935, with the East River Generating Station and its two smokestacks visible on the far right

Coal was delivered to the plant by barges, which were unloaded by coal towers that traveled along the bulkhead. Conveyor belts were used to move the coal from the bulkhead into the coal preparation house on the south side of East 14th Street, which contained raw coal bunkers, steam dryers, and pulverizing mills. Pulverized coal was transported by pressure through pipes in a bridge connecting the mill house to the power house on the north side of East 14th Street. About half of the width of the power house was occupied by the boiler room running along the south side of the building; electrical galleries occupied the north side of the building and a generator room was located in between. Six boilers were used to supply steam for the two generators.

The East River Generating Station originally had two smokestacks, both rising 376.5 feet (114.8 m) above the floor of the basement, and was planned to include a total of seven smokestacks after expansion of the facility was completed. The power station was located in close proximity to six hospitals, including the Willard Parker Hospital located on East 16th Street between Avenue C and the East River. Cyclonic separation was used to remove particulate matter from smoke before it was released from the plant's chimneys. A total of twelve 60-foot-tall (18 m) collectors were installed on the roof of the plant, which used powerful fans and cone-shaped cylinders to create artificial cyclones that separated particulates from the gases using centrifugal force. Before entering the cyclones, gases were first washed to remove cinders.

A third generator with a capacity of 160 MW was placed into operation in October 1929. A luncheon was held inside Boiler No. 9 on December 2, 1929 to celebrate the completion of the installation of the new generator and three new boilers supplying steam for the new unit. The first two new boilers had been placed into operation in October and November, respectively, and the third boiler was fired after the luncheon to allow the generator to operate at full capacity. Nearly 100 people attended the luncheon, which was held in the 95-foot-high (29 m), 23-foot-wide (7.0 m) and 63-foot-deep (19 m) boiler. The East River Generating Station was the first power station to install boilers capable of producing one million pounds (450,000 kg) of steam per hour; the three boilers were manufactured by the Combustion Engineering Company.

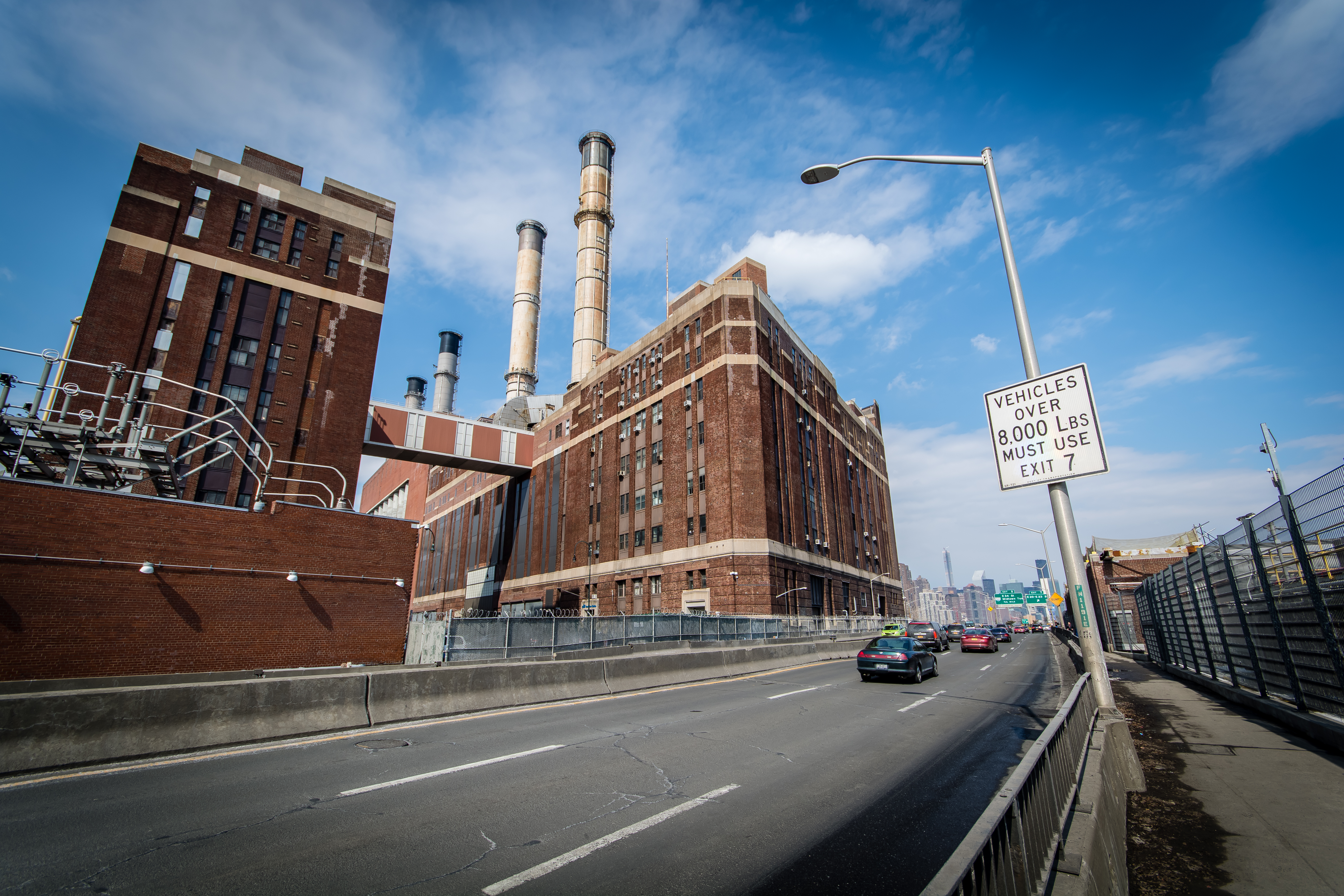
The segment of the FDR Drive alongside the power plant first opened in 1939.

The segment of the East River Drive between East 12th and 18th streets, which was constructed along the east side of the plant, first opened to traffic in 1939.

=== Subsequent expansions ===
In 1946, Con Edison began planning to nearly double the capacity of the East River Generating Station by adding two new generators and boilers. The power plant was expanded with an addition on the west side of the facility; two new 125 MW generators, Units 5 and 6, were placed into service in 1951. Four years later, another new generator (Unit 7) was also placed into service.

In 1957, Con Edison purchased an entire block located on the south side of the power plant from the Eagle Pencil Company, which leased back the site for one year prior to its move to a new factory under construction in Danbury, Connecticut. The block extended for a distance of 676 feet (206 m) between Avenues C and D and had a frontage of 206 feet (63 m) on East 13th and 14th streets. Three years later, in 1960, Con Edison also acquired the blocks located on the north side of the power plant between East 15th and 17th streets for a future expansion; this property had been occupied by the Willard Parker Hospital and was bought at an auction of city-owned parcels. The sale of land had to be authorized by the New York State Legislature after it was subsequently determined that part of the property had once been land under water.

Con Edison constructed three 5-million-US-gallon (19 Ml) fuel oil storage tanks on the block formerly occupied by the Eagle Pencil Company as part of its plans to reduce air pollution by converting the generating station to burn oil instead of coal. The tanks had to be supported on over 7,700 wooden piles since the site had previously been filled in from the East River and bedrock was located 100 feet (30 m) below the surface. Three years earlier, Con Edison had announced plans to convert the generating station's fuel supply from coal to natural gas, but decided to switch to oil after objections raised by the Federal Power Commission and ongoing litigation delayed the conversion.

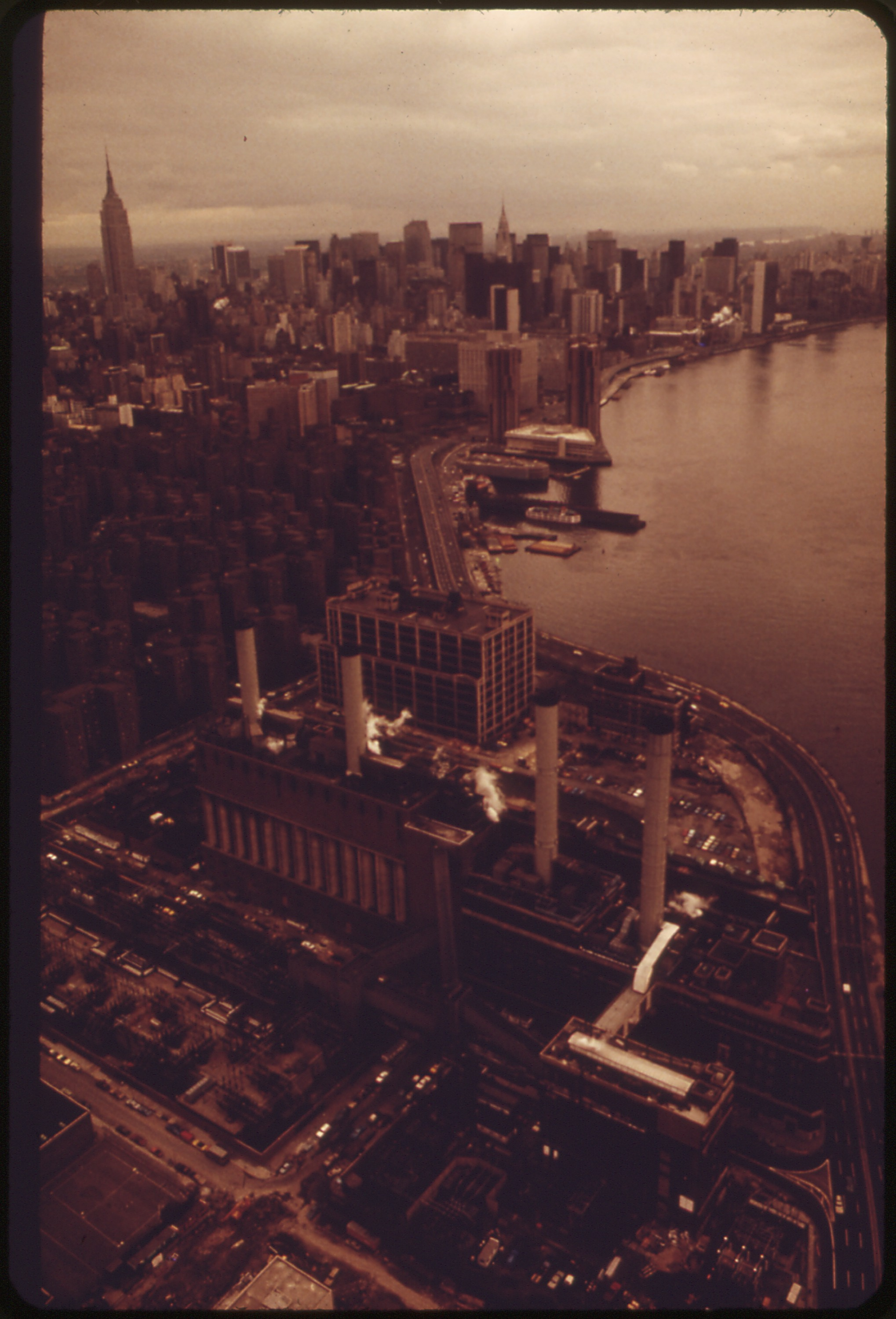
Aerial view looking north at the power plant and Midtown Manhattan in 1973

In September 1961, Con Edison announced it had placed an order with the Allis-Chalmers Manufacturing Company to construct a 1,000 MW turbine generator; it later placed an order with Combustion Engineering, Inc. for a boiler to provide steam for the new turbine. The new equipment was planned to be housed adjacent to the East River Drive between East 15th and 17th streets, on the former site of the Willard Parker Hospital. A month-long supply of fuel oil for the proposed generating unit—100 million US gallons (380 Ml)—was planned to be stored on a 15-acre (6.1 ha) concrete platform built over a portion of the East River from East 17th to 22nd streets, which was to be covered by a 1,000-car parking lot and a one-acre (0.40 ha) public park. Development of the tank farm would necessitate the demolition of Piers 67, 68, 69 and 70 as well as the relocation of an existing Transit Mix Concrete Corporation plant from the bulkhead onto the new platform. After test borings taken at the site revealed the presence of poor subsurface rock conditions, Con Edison decided to instead install the 1,000 MW generator at the Ravenswood Generating Station in Long Island City. The turbine, known as Ravenswood No. 3 and "Big Allis", was placed into operation in 1965.

In 1977, Con Edison was selected by the Energy Research and Development Administration to operate a 4.8 MW fuel cell plant as part of a two-year demonstration project, which it planned to install to the north of the power plant at East 15th Street and the FDR Drive. Construction of the fuel cell plant was suspended in 1984 after the project had fallen three years behind schedule. The demonstration plant was ultimately dismantled before generating any electricity.

Unit 5 at the East River Generating Station was retired in 1995.

=== East River Repowering Project ===
In 1999, Con Edison announced plans to close its Waterside Generating Station and sell the property to private developers. To replace the loss of the electricity and steam that was being produced at the Waterside plant, new equipment was proposed to be added inside an unused section of the East River Generating Station to "repower" the facility with combined-cycle equipment and increase its capacity—a plan referred to as the East River Repowering Project (ERRP). The New York Public Service Commission initially approved the ERRP in August 2001, but later agreed to hold more hearings to assess the effects of the project on PM_{2.5} after receiving a petition from New York State Assemblyman Steven Sanders, Manhattan Community Board 3, and the New York Public Interest Research Group. Con Edison reached an agreement addressing the air pollution concerns of residents near the East River Generating Station and environmental groups in March 2002.

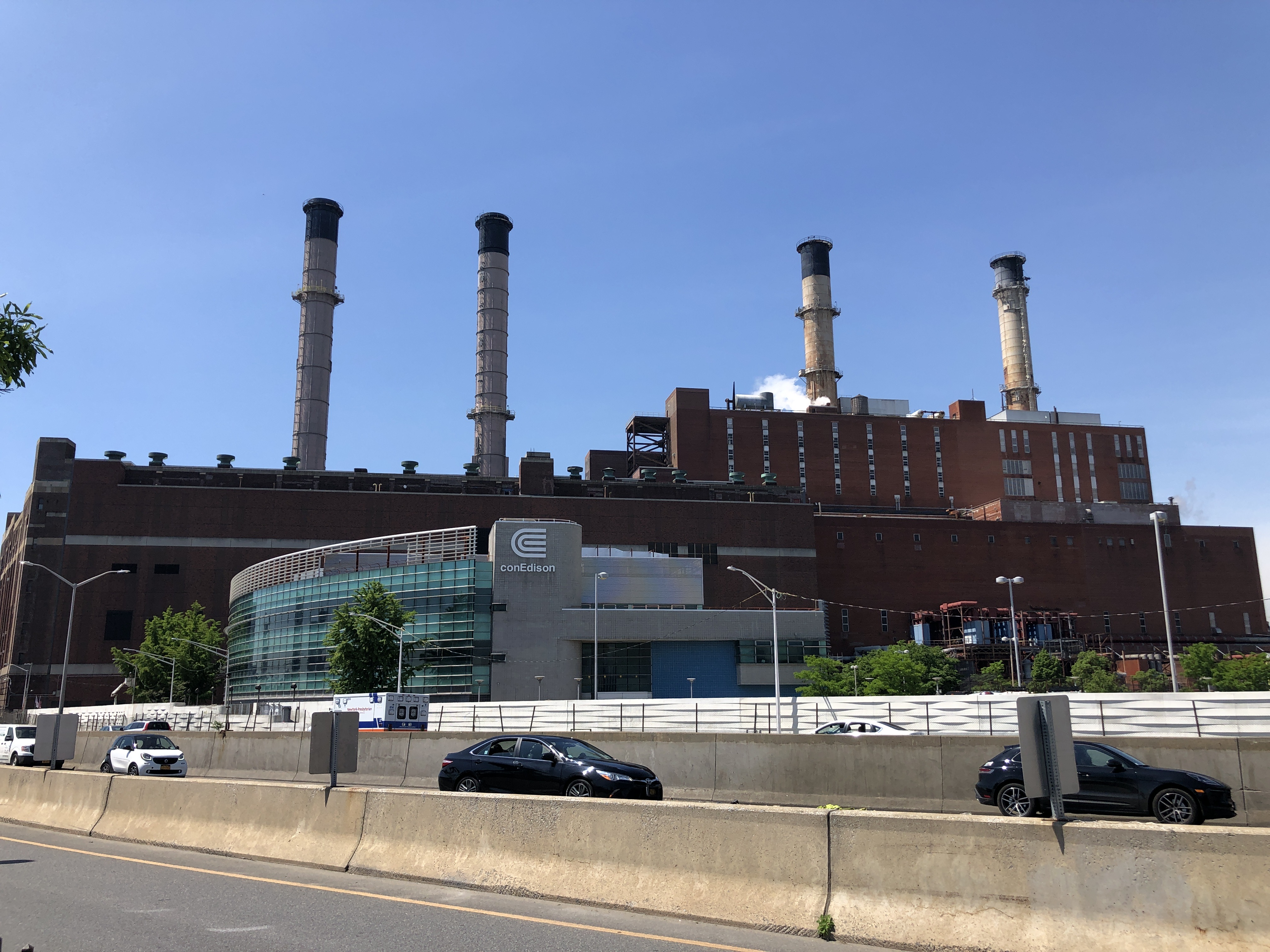
View of the power plant, East 16th Street Service Center and a floodwall from the East Side Coastal Resiliency project in 2024

In April 2002, the East 16th Street Service Center opened to the north of the power station, which houses Con Edison's 24-hour emergency call center and data operations center. The three-story building was designed by the architectural firm of Richard Dattner & Partners and has a curved glass wall on its east facade that follows the edge of the FDR Drive. Field crews stationed at the building were previously dispatched from a building located on First Avenue and East 40th Street adjacent to the Waterside Generating Station.

Work on the ERRP was completed in April 2005 when the new equipment at the East River Generating Station was placed into service. This included two combustion turbines (Units 1 and 2) capable of producing a total of 360 MW of electricity, two heat recovery steam generators capable of producing up to a total of 1,400,000 pounds (640,000 kg) of steam per hour, a water treatment facility (to provide demineralized water for the steam generators), and 80,000 feet (24,000 m) of piping. Exhaust from the turbines and natural gas duct firing is used to also generate up to a total of 1,800,000 pounds (820,000 kg) of steam per hour.

After the events of September 11, 2001, the portions of East 14th and 15th streets between Avenue C and the FDR Drive that ran along the north and south sides of the power plant, the southbound exit and entrance ramps connecting these streets to the FDR Drive, and the portion of Avenue D between East 13th and 14th streets had been closed to traffic to support construction of the ERRP. The New York City Police Department determined that the continued closure of these streets was necessary for security purposes; an environmental assessment statement was prepared in 2005 for the permanent closure of the affected streets and sidewalks.

=== Hurricane Sandy and resiliency efforts ===
Video of electric arcing at the 13th Street substation during Hurricane Sandy

When Hurricane Sandy struck New York City on October 29, 2012, flooding from the East River forced the power station to go offline and some of the facility's equipment, including three 13-kV transformers, was damaged beyond repair. The storm surge reached a height of nearly 14 feet (4.3 m), exceeding the 12-foot-high (3.7 m) wall that surrounded the 13th Street substation on the south side of the power plant. Flooding at the substation, which supplies power to most parts of Manhattan south of 36th Street, was the cause of most of the power outages in Manhattan that lasted until November 2, 2012. During Hurricane Sandy, electric arcing in the transformers at the substation lit up the sky and led some people to believe that there had been an explosion at the site.

After Hurricane Sandy, projects were undertaken at the power plant to increase its resiliency, including raising the height of equipment and walls as well as the addition of drains, floodgates, moats, and pumping systems. Other flood protection systems are also being constructed along the East River from Montgomery Street to East 25th Street as part of the city's East Side Coastal Resiliency project, which began construction in 2020 and is expected to continue through 2026; these include a floodwall that extends from the north side of the generating station running along the west side of the FDR Drive and the raising of the East River Park to the south of the power plant. The city's new flood protection systems are being designed to work in conjunction with the existing flood protection systems that have been implemented by Con Edison at the East River Generating Station and its other nearby facilities.

== Characteristics ==
The power station has four units and is capable of producing 680 MW of electric power. When combined with the five package boilers at the East River South Steam Station, which produce 650,000 pounds (290,000 kg) of steam per hour, the power plant (a cogeneration facility) has an overall capacity of 5,880,000 pounds (2,670,000 kg) of steam per hour. As of 2014, the East River Generating Station produced 55 percent of the total supply for the New York City steam system. The facility has four smokestacks, which range in height from 368 to 370 feet (112 to 113 m).

Unit	Electric Capacity	Steam Capacity (Note: 1 Mlb (mass of steam) is equivalent to 1,000 pounds (450 kg) of steam.)	First Operated	Power Source
1	180 MW	1,600 Mlb/hr	2005	Natural Gas/No. 6 Fuel
2	180 MW	1,600 Mlb/hr	2005	Natural Gas/No. 6 Fuel
6	156 MW	1,200 Mlb/hr	1951	Natural Gas/No. 6 Fuel
7	200 MW	830 Mlb/hr	1955	Natural Gas/No. 6 Fuel

== Architecture ==
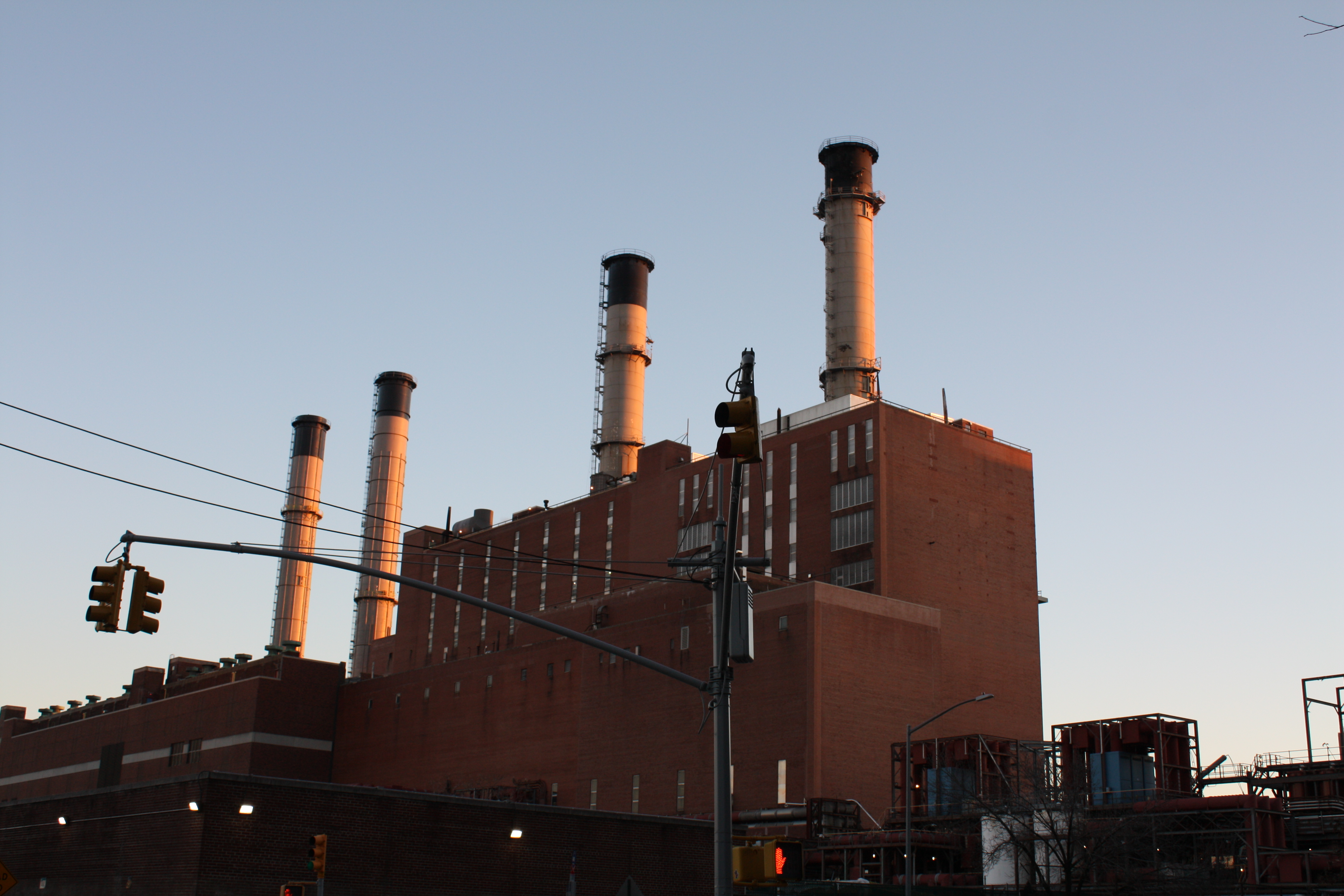
The power station's western addition has a monolithic brick form.

The original power house is clad in red brick and includes stringcourses of imitation limestone, a water table of artificial cast cut granite and vertical fenestration, a design which was meant by the New York Edison Company to "convey a sense of massiveness, simplicity, and appropriateness". The design was not as grandiose compared to some of the company's earlier power stations that were typically designed in the Beaux-Arts style. The east facade of the building along the East River was divided into three rectilinear bays.

The western part of the power station, which was added by Con Edison in the 1950s, has a minimalist style with much less ornamentation and a monolithic brick form. The south facade of the addition contains 13 concrete cylinders.
