= Lewis B. Stillwell =

American electrical engineer

Lewis Buckley Stillwell
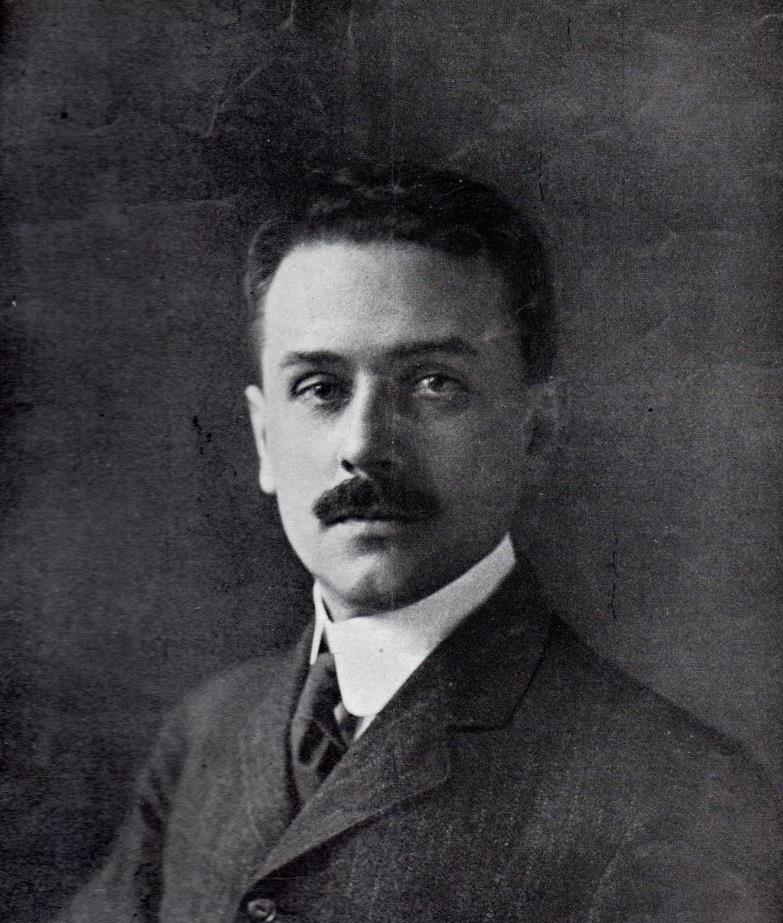
- Born: March 12, 1863; Scranton, Pennsylvania, U.S.
- Died: January 19, 1941 (aged 77); Baltimore, Maryland, U.S.
- Education: Wesleyan University; Lehigh University
- Awards: IEEE Edison Medal (1935)
- Scientific career
- Fields: Electrical engineering

Lewis Buckley Stillwell (March 12, 1863 – January 19, 1941) was an American electrical engineer and the president of American Institute of Electrical Engineers (AIEE) from 1909 to 1910. He received the AIEE Lamme Medal (1933) and the AIEE Edison Medal (1935), for "his distinguished engineering achievements and his pioneer work in the generation, distribution, and utilization of electric energy." He also was inducted into the IEEE's Electrical Engineering Hall of Fame. His papers (1886–1939) are held in the Manuscript Division of the Princeton University Library. In 1898, he was elected to the American Philosophical Society. He was elected as a member of the National Academy of Sciences in 1921.

Stillwell matriculated at Wesleyan University in 1882; two years later he entered Lehigh University and graduated in 1885 with a degree in electrical engineering. Lehigh bestowed the M.S. degree upon him in 1907; Wesleyan, the Sc.D. in the same year. "He is credited with a number of inventions including the Stillwell regulator and a time-limit circuit breaker." "Few of the pioneer electrical engineers of the United States contributed as much to the advancement of electrical engineering, and the position of the engineer in public esteem, as did Lewis Buckley Stillwell."
