= Edwin Reynolds (engineer) =

American mechanical engineer, consulting engineer & inventor (1831–1909)

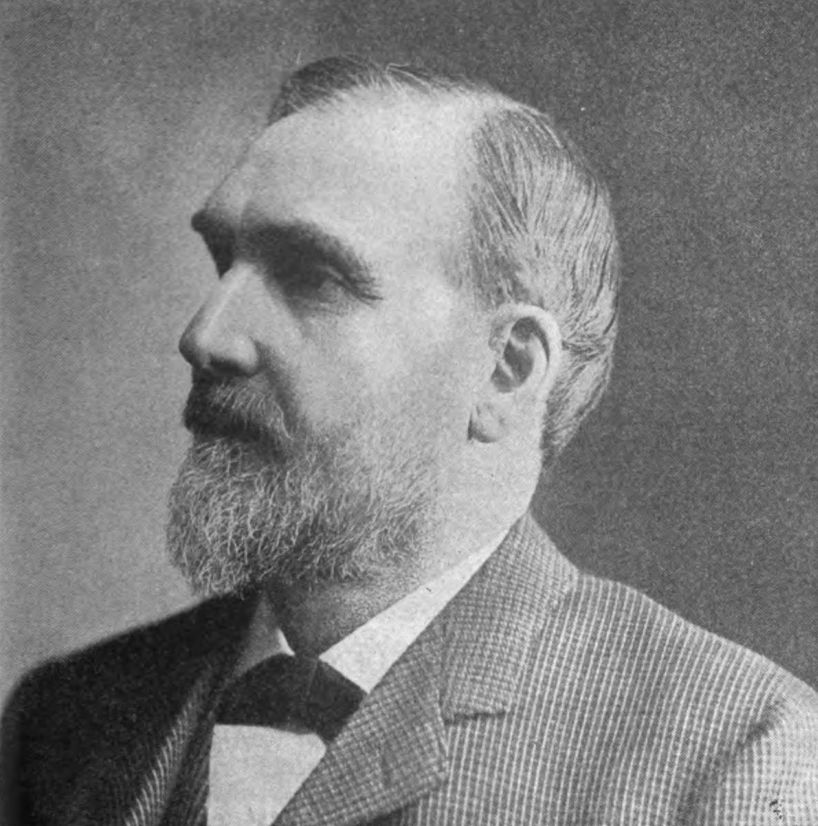
Edwin Reynolds, 1901

Edwin Reynolds (March 23, 1831 – February 19, 1909) was an American mechanical engineer, consulting engineer and inventor, and president of the American Society of Mechanical Engineers in the year 1902–03. He is known for the development of the Corliss-Reynolds triple expansion pumping engine for water works.

== Biography ==
Reynolds was born in Mansfield, Connecticut, son of Christopher and Charissa (Huntington) Reynolds. He received some years of education at the common school, and started working early as farm hand. In 1847 he was offered a three-year apprenticeship at a machine shop that repaired machinery of the local textile mills. He was promoted foreman at the age of 18. Subsequently, he worked at papermaking machinery manufacturing in South Windham for a year, was department head at Woodruff & Beach Iron Works in Hartford, Connecticut, and worked in several machine shops from Massachusetts to Ohio.

In 1857 he moved to Aurora, Indiana, where he became superintendent at the Stedham & Co machine and repair shop. During the civil war he worked as engineer in New York and Boston. In 1867 he was appointed by George H. Corliss as engineer and salesman at the Corliss Engine Works at Providence, where he was promoted to superintendent in 1871. In 1877 moved to Reliance Works of Edward P. Allis in Milwaukee, where he was appointed general manager and superintendent. He served at the Allis Company, where he eventually became second vice president and director of the Allis Company, until 1902.

In his last years he worked as a consulting engineer, and was president of the American Society of Mechanical Engineers 1902–03. He died in 1909 in Milwaukee.

== Publications ==
Patents

- US 125084 A, Improvement in governors for steam-engines. 1872
- US 398903 A, Valve mechanism for ore-staivips, 1889
- US 505004 A, Compound engine, 1893
- US 704270 A, Controlling mechanism for steam-engine regulators, 1900–02.
- US 811520 A, Steam-engine. 1900–06

Publications about Edwin Reynolds

- Cliff White. "The Reynolds-Corliss Engine," in: The steam user; a book of instruction for engineers and steam users, 1890. p. xx-xxviii
- Iron Trade Review editor, "Dead of Edwin Reynolds," Iron Trade Review, Volume 44, 1909, p. 404
