= Death and state funeral of Ruth Bader Ginsburg =

2020 death of a US Supreme Court justice

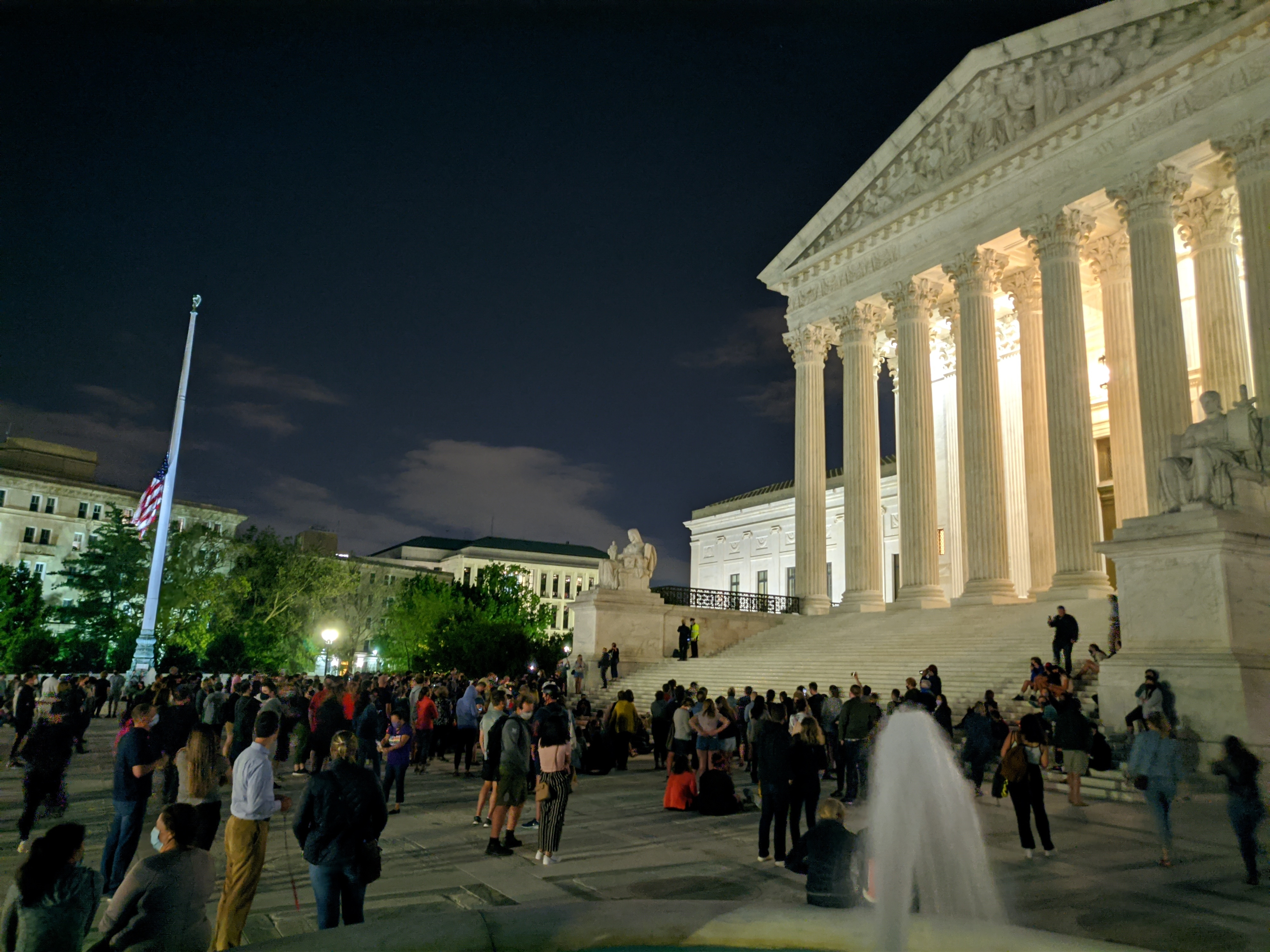
Mourners gather at the Supreme Court after the announcement of Ruth Bader Ginsburg's death

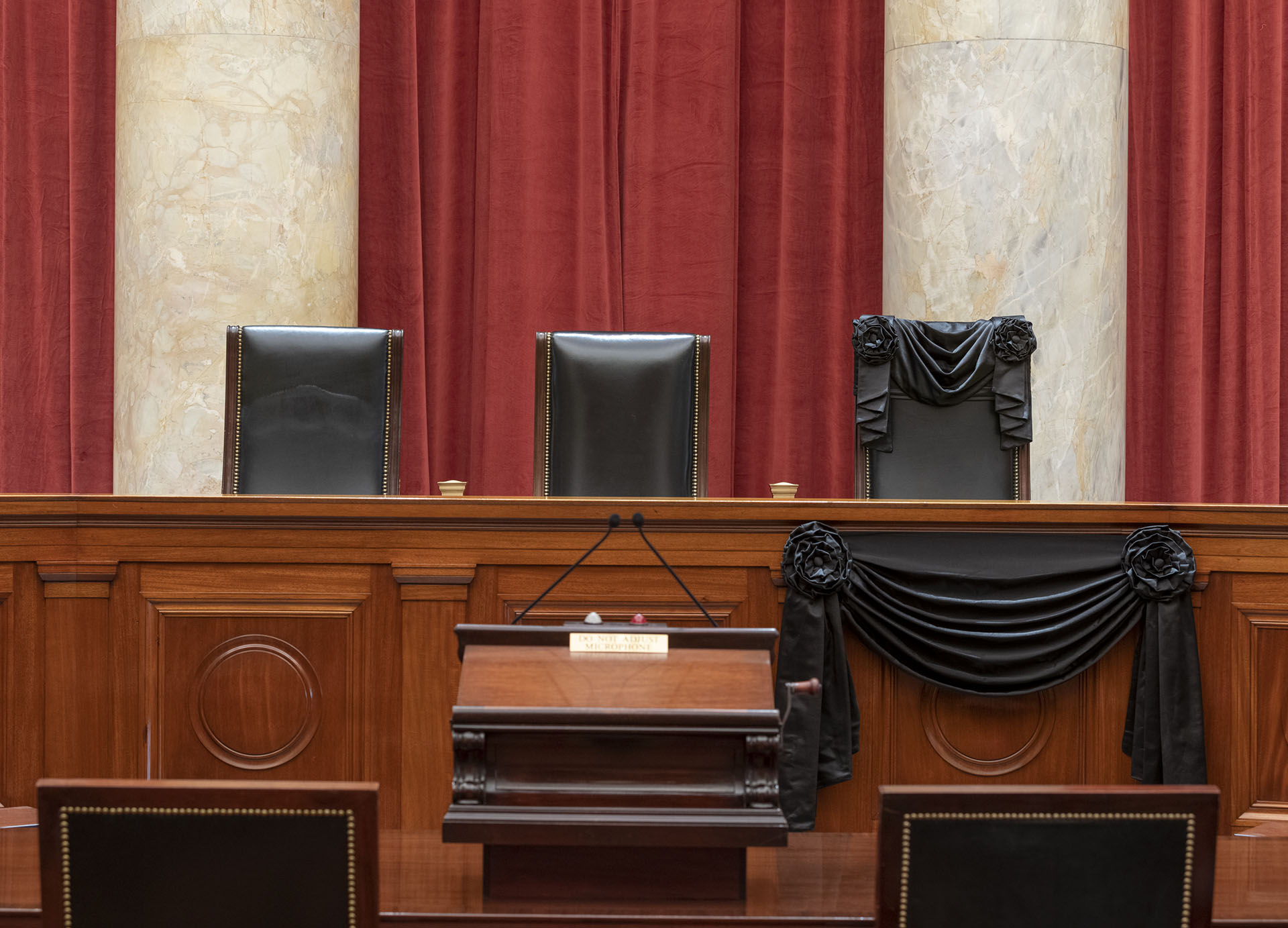
Courtroom with Ginsburg's seat draped in black, the day after her death

Ruth Bader Ginsburg, Associate Justice of the Supreme Court of the United States, died from complications of metastatic pancreatic cancer on September 18, 2020, at the age of 87. Her death received immediate and significant public attention; a vigil at the Supreme Court plaza in Washington, D.C., was held that same evening. Memorials and vigils were held in several U.S. cities, including Chicago, New York City, and San Francisco.

Ginsburg became the first woman to lie in repose at the Supreme Court Building, between September 23 and 24, a longer-than-usual period. On September 25, she lay in state at the Capitol, becoming the first woman and first Jew to receive this honor. A private interment service was held at Arlington National Cemetery on September 29.

== Health and death ==
Ginsburg had previously been diagnosed with colon cancer, which was in remission by 1999, and early-stage pancreatic cancer in 2009. In 2014, she had surgery to implant a stent. Tumors in her lungs were detected in December 2018 while she was being treated for broken ribs from a fall in November 2018. She previously hurt two ribs in June 2012. She had pancreatic cancer in August 2019 and went into remission a few times. She was briefly hospitalized in November 2019 for a fever and chills. Again, she was hospitalized for a gallbladder complication in May 2020. She was also hospitalized in July for an unidentified infection. Ginsburg died from complications of metastatic pancreatic cancer at her home in Washington, D.C., on September 18, 2020, aged 87. Days before her death, according to her granddaughter Clara Spera, an attorney, she dictated a statement which reads in part: "My most fervent wish is that I will not be replaced until a new president is installed."

== Vigils ==
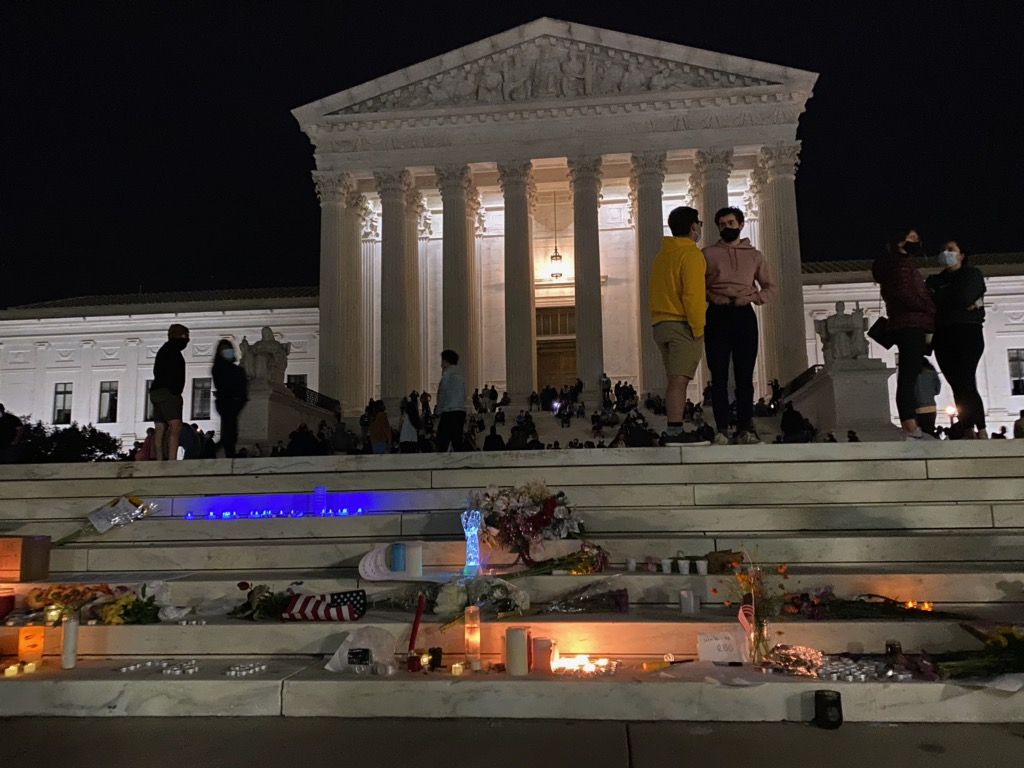
A candlelit makeshift memorial to Ginsburg on the day she died

Hundreds of people began gathering in front of the Supreme Court in Washington, D.C., within hours of the news of Ginsburg's death. The Mourners' Kaddish was recited by mourners, along with songs such as "Amazing Grace" and "America the Beautiful". Other gatherings were held in cities across the United States. Online memorials were created on social media platforms. By the following morning, a makeshift memorial had been created on the steps of the court.

On September 19, the tributes at the Supreme Court were removed and a barricade erected in front of the building. About 2,500 people attended a vigil that evening. Among the several speakers at the rally were Democratic Senators Kirsten Gillibrand of New York and Elizabeth Warren of Massachusetts. Warren drew cheers from the crowd as she criticized the Senate Majority Leader Mitch McConnell, a Republican. Many speakers made references to abortion access, of which Ginsburg was a proponent; Jasmine Clemons of Planned Parenthood, speaking of her own decision to have an abortion, said "I made the best decision for my life, my future and my body. That was made possible because of women like Justice Ginsburg."

Vigils were also held in other cities across the United States. Some gatherings were promoted by organizers of the Women's March who urged people to gather at their local courthouses. Hundreds of people attended vigils in Chicago, Kingston, New York, Portland, Maine, Minneapolis and San Francisco. An image of Ginsburg and messages reading "thank you" and "rest in power" were projected on the New York State Supreme Court Building in New York City. White jabots (or collars), similar to those worn by Ginsburg, were placed on several statues in New York City, most notably on the Fearless Girl sculpture outside the New York Stock Exchange Building.

== Memorials and tributes ==
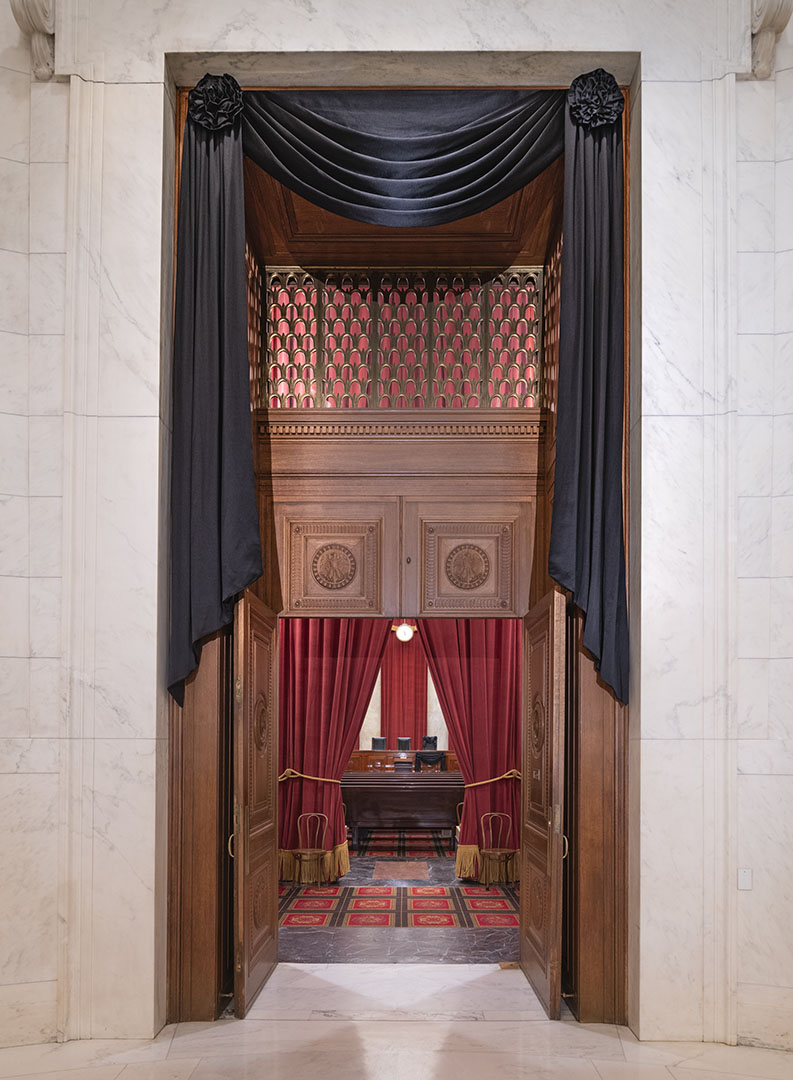
The courtroom doors of the Supreme Court, Ginsburg's seat, and the bench before her seat each draped in black the day after her death

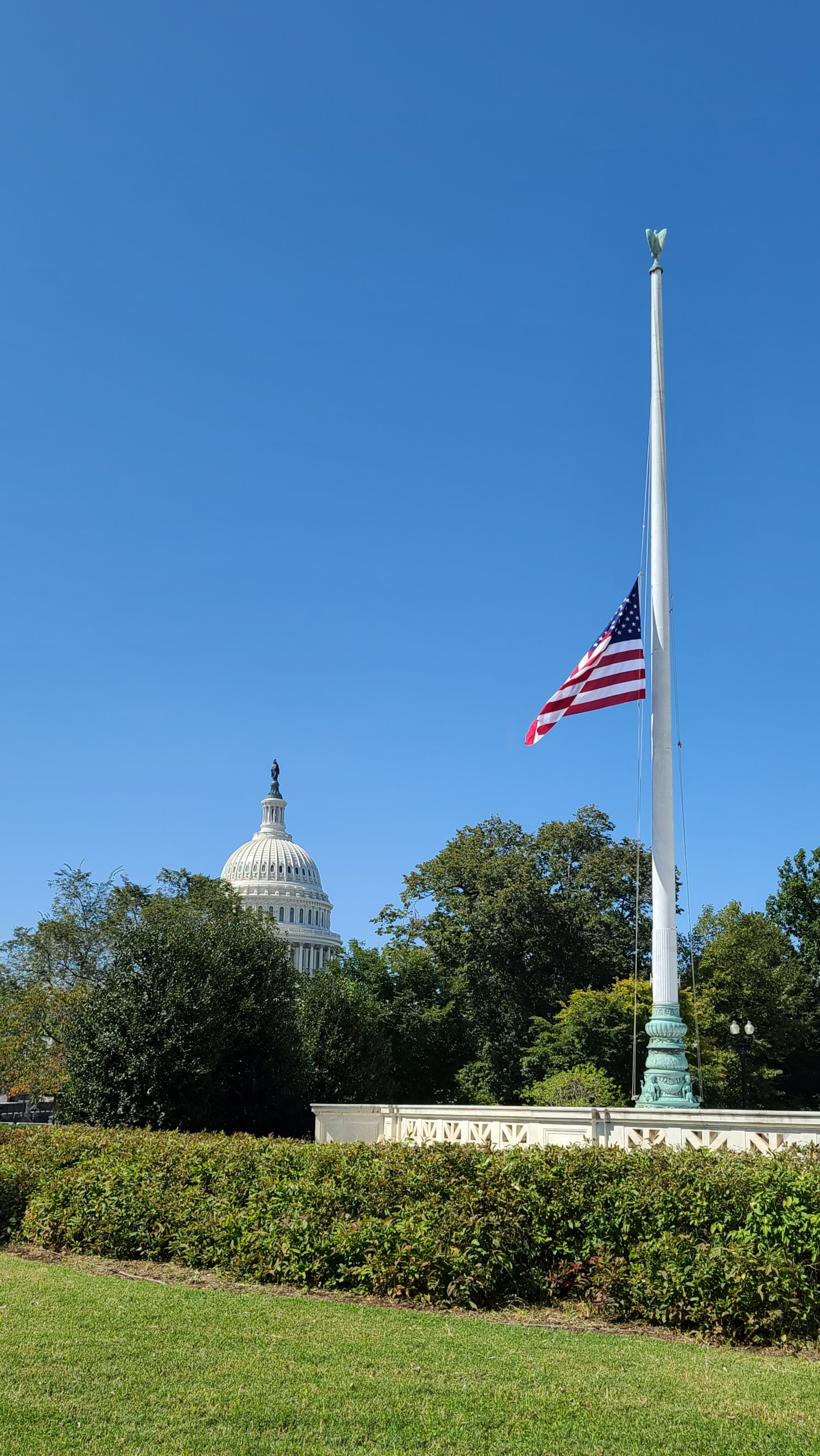
An American flag at half-staff at the Supreme Court with the Capitol in the background on September 23

As has been tradition since as early as 1873 on the death of Chief Justice Salmon P. Chase, the courtroom doors of the Supreme Court, Ginsburg's seat, and the bench in front of her seat were draped in black. On September 18, Speaker Nancy Pelosi of the House of Representatives ordered flags at the U.S. Capitol to be flown at half-staff in honor of Ginsburg. On September 19, President Trump also ordered all U.S. flags at federal buildings to be flown at half-staff until Ginsburg's burial.

Shortly after Ginsburg's death, multiple statues and renaming of locations were proposed in her honor. Bill de Blasio, Mayor of New York City, announced that the Brooklyn Municipal Building in New York City would be renamed in honor of Ginsburg, who was born and raised in Brooklyn. Andrew Cuomo, Governor of New York, announced that a statue of Ginsburg would be installed in Brooklyn. He said he would appoint a commission to select an artist and location. The statue was completed and installed outside of Albee Square on March 12, 2021.

On September 19, landmarks across the state of New York were illuminated in blue as a tribute to Ginsburg. These included the One World Trade Center, Grand Central Terminal, Kosciuszko Bridge, Niagara Falls, and Mid-Hudson Bridge. Representative Raja Krishnamoorthi introduced legislation for a bust of Ginsburg to be created and installed in the Capitol Rotunda. In Minnesota, Mayor Jacob Frey of Minneapolis and Mayor Melvin Carter of Saint Paul issued a proclamation declaring September 21 to be "Ruth Bader Ginsburg Day" in their respective cities. On September 25, the Empire State Building in New York City was lit with red, white and blue in honor of Ginsburg.

== Reactions ==
=== United States ===
Ginsburg was praised by legal figures including Chief Justice John Roberts who called her a "jurist of historic stature", stating that the Supreme Court had lost a cherished colleague and also had confidence that future generations would remember her as a "tireless and resolute champion of justice." In a viral tweet, Ruth Franklin, an author and book critic, noted that "according to Jewish tradition, a person who dies on Rosh Hashanah ... is a tzadeikes, a person of great righteousness".

Her death was announced while both President Trump and presidential candidate Joe Biden were campaigning in Minnesota; Trump was making a speech during his rally and Biden was on a campaign plane flying back to his home in Wilmington, Delaware, with spotty Wi-Fi connection. As a result, neither made statements immediately after the news was announced; Trump made a statement after his speech concluded while he was heading towards Air Force One, and when Biden landed at New Castle Airport, he too made a statement. Trump, on hearing of Ginsburg's death for the first time, said she "was an amazing woman who led an amazing life". Biden told reporters that Ginsburg's death was "very sad news" and highlighted the need to choose a successor only once the election had concluded. The White House also issued a statement praising Ginsburg, saying, among other things, "Her opinions, including well-known decisions regarding the legal equality of women and the disabled, have inspired all Americans and generations of great legal minds."

Speaker Pelosi used Twitter to express her sympathy, saying that Ginsburg's death was "an incalculable loss for our democracy and for all who sacrifice and strive to build a better future for our children". Governor Cuomo described Ginsburg as someone who "pursued truth and justice in a world of division, giving voice to the voiceless and uplifting those who were pushed aside by forces of hate and indifference". Hillary Clinton, who was the First Lady when Ginsburg was appointed to the Supreme Court, said "There will never be another like her." On September 20, former U.S. President Bill Clinton, who nominated Ginsburg to the U.S. Supreme Court and also held a public rally with her in Little Rock, Arkansas, just over a year before her death, paid tribute to Ginsburg in a televised interview with Face the Nation's Margaret Brennan. He said, among other things, that "People were really pulling for her and they really gravitated to her because of her sense of equality and fairness, and they thought, unlike much in politics today, she was totally on the level."

Senator Bernie Sanders issued condolences and showed admiration for Ginsburg via social media, as did several celebrities, politicians, and athletes including Mindy Kaling, Meghan Markle, Kate McKinnon, Stacey Abrams, Orlando Jones and Meghan McCain.

During a September 21 appearance on Fox & Friends, President Trump suggested that Ginsburg's dictated statement before her death may have been manufactured by the Democratic political leadership in Congress, including Speaker Pelosi, Senator Schumer, the Minority Leader who represents New York, and Representative Adam Schiff of California. The Democrats angrily denied Trump's suggestion. The NPR correspondent Nina Totenberg, a reporter covering Supreme Court who published the original report about Justice Ginsburg's last wish, subsequently confirmed that the statement had come from Ginsburg herself. Totenberg stated that there were other witnesses in the room, apart from her granddaughter, including her doctor. Trump's allegation gave birth to a conspiracy theory which spread quickly through social media and was taken up by some conservative public figures. Fox News host Tucker Carlson declared that it would have been "pathetic" for Justice Ginsburg to make such a dying declaration and that he did not believe she had said it. Subsequently, Senator Ted Cruz, Republican from Texas, blocked the U.S. Senate resolution honoring Ginsburg because it contained language referring to her dying wish.

=== International ===
Ursula von der Leyen, President of the European Commission, described Ginsburg as a "pioneer for women's right, law and justice". Justin Trudeau, Prime Minister of Canada, wrote: "A profound and fearless advocate for women, equality, and justice, Ruth Bader Ginsburg's impact will undoubtedly be felt for generations. My thoughts are with her family, colleagues, and all who were inspired by her lifetime of service." Emmanuel Macron, President of France, wrote: "A truly exceptional woman has left us. Throughout her entire life, Ruth Bader Ginsburg fought for justice, gender equality, and respect for fundamental rights. Her outstanding legacy shall be our inspiration for a long time to come." Emily Haber, German Ambassador to the United States, wrote: "Germany has often looked across the Atlantic, not only to the US but to Justice Ginsburg herself – a pioneer for women, a standard-bearer, a fighter." Pedro Sánchez, Prime Minister of Spain, sent his "deepest condolences to her family, to the world of Justice and to the American people."

== Funeral services ==
=== Supreme Court Building ===
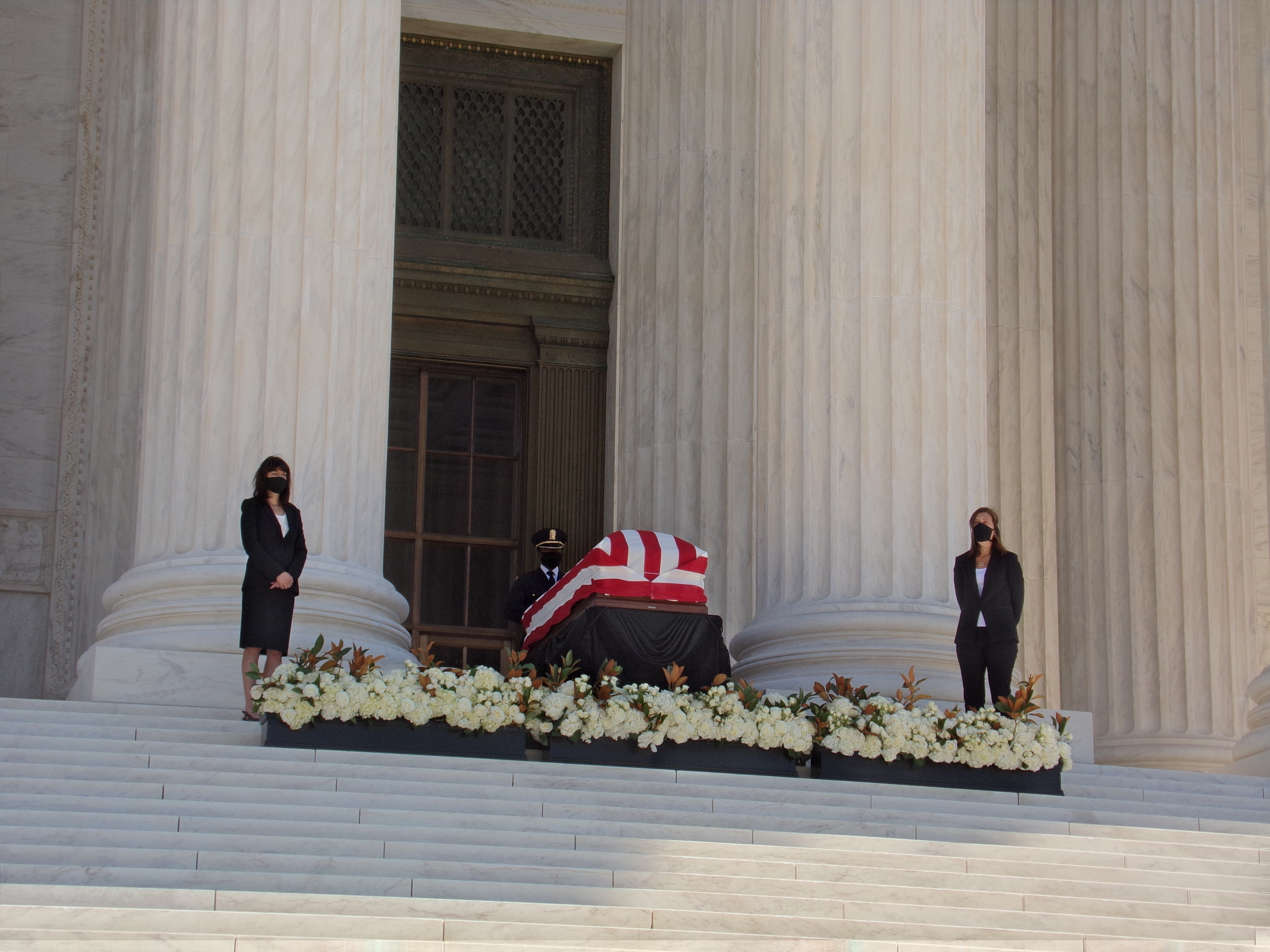
Ginsburg's casket at the top of the Supreme Court steps, flanked by two of her former law clerks and an honor guard from the Supreme Court Police

Ginsburg lay in repose at the Supreme Court Building for the two days on September 23–24. Previous ceremonies for Associate Justices were limited to a single day, including the ceremony for Chief Justice William Rehnquist as well as those for Associate Justices William J. Brennan Jr., John Paul Stevens, and Antonin Scalia. Her public viewing was held outdoors from 11 am to 10 pm on the first day, and 9 am to 10 pm on the second day. Ginsburg is the first woman to lie in repose at the Supreme Court.

Her funeral began at around 9:30 am on September 23 when her casket arrived at the Supreme Court. More than a hundred of her law clerks from her time as an appellate judge and Supreme Court justice lined the steps. Eight officers from the Supreme Court Police carried the casket up the steps into the Supreme Court and placed it atop the catafalque previously used for the funeral of Abraham Lincoln. Rabbi Lauren Holtzblatt of Adas Israel Congregation, a Conservative Judaism synagogue in Washington, D.C., began the ceremony with a chanting of "Adonai Roi", a song of mourning from Psalm 23, in both Hebrew and English, and ended with "El Malei Rachamim", the prayer about a merciful God traditionally said for the departed. The rabbi, who was an adviser to Justice Ginsburg and is married to Ari Holtzblatt, one of Ginsburg's former law clerks, eulogized Ginsburg as "an American hero". She also said, "It's the rare prophet who not only imagines a new world but also makes that new world a reality in her lifetime. This was the brilliance and vision of Justice Ruth Bader Ginsburg." This was followed by a eulogy from Chief Justice Roberts who described Ginsburg as a "rock star ... tough, brave, a fighter, a winner, but also thoughtful, careful, compassionate, honest." In attendance at the short ceremony inside were all eight remaining justices as well as retired Justice Anthony Kennedy.

At around 11 am, Ginsburg's casket was brought outside and placed near the top of the Supreme Court steps. Hundreds of people stood in line awaiting their turn to pay their respects. A winding metal barricade had been installed on East Capitol Street to accommodate the queue. The crowd filled the blocked-off street from 1st to 2nd Street and extended onto the sidewalk on 2nd Street all the way up to the parking lot of the Thomas Jefferson Building. Some had come from Pennsylvania, Louisiana, and Vermont. Several public figures also visited the casket on the first day, including Vice President Mike Pence and Second Lady Karen Pence, and former President Bill Clinton and former Secretary of State Hillary Clinton. A large group of lawmakers from the Democratic Party also visited the casket, including senators Chuck Schumer of New York, Ed Markey of Massachusetts, Chris Coons of Delaware, and Patrick Leahy of Vermont. Bernie Sanders, an independent senator from Vermont, and Susan Collins, a Republican senator from Maine, also paid their respects.

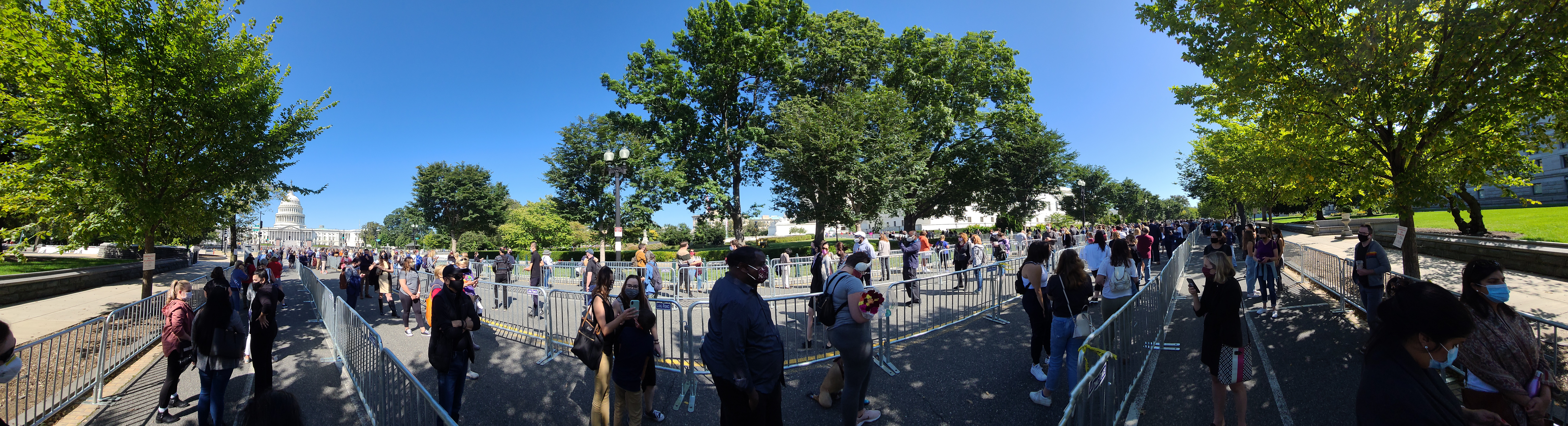
People waiting in line on East Capitol Street to pay their respects on September 23, wearing masks in light of the COVID-19 pandemic

The following day, Ginsburg's casket was again placed at the top of the Supreme Court steps. President Trump and First Lady Melania Trump visited the casket just before 10 am. By then, people had begun gathering to await their turn to approach the casket. A crowd began booing and shouting at President Trump when he appeared behind the casket; chants were heard including: "Vote him out!" and "Honor her wish", a reference to Ginsburg's dictated statement days before her death that a successor not be appointed "until a new president is installed".

=== Capitol Building ===
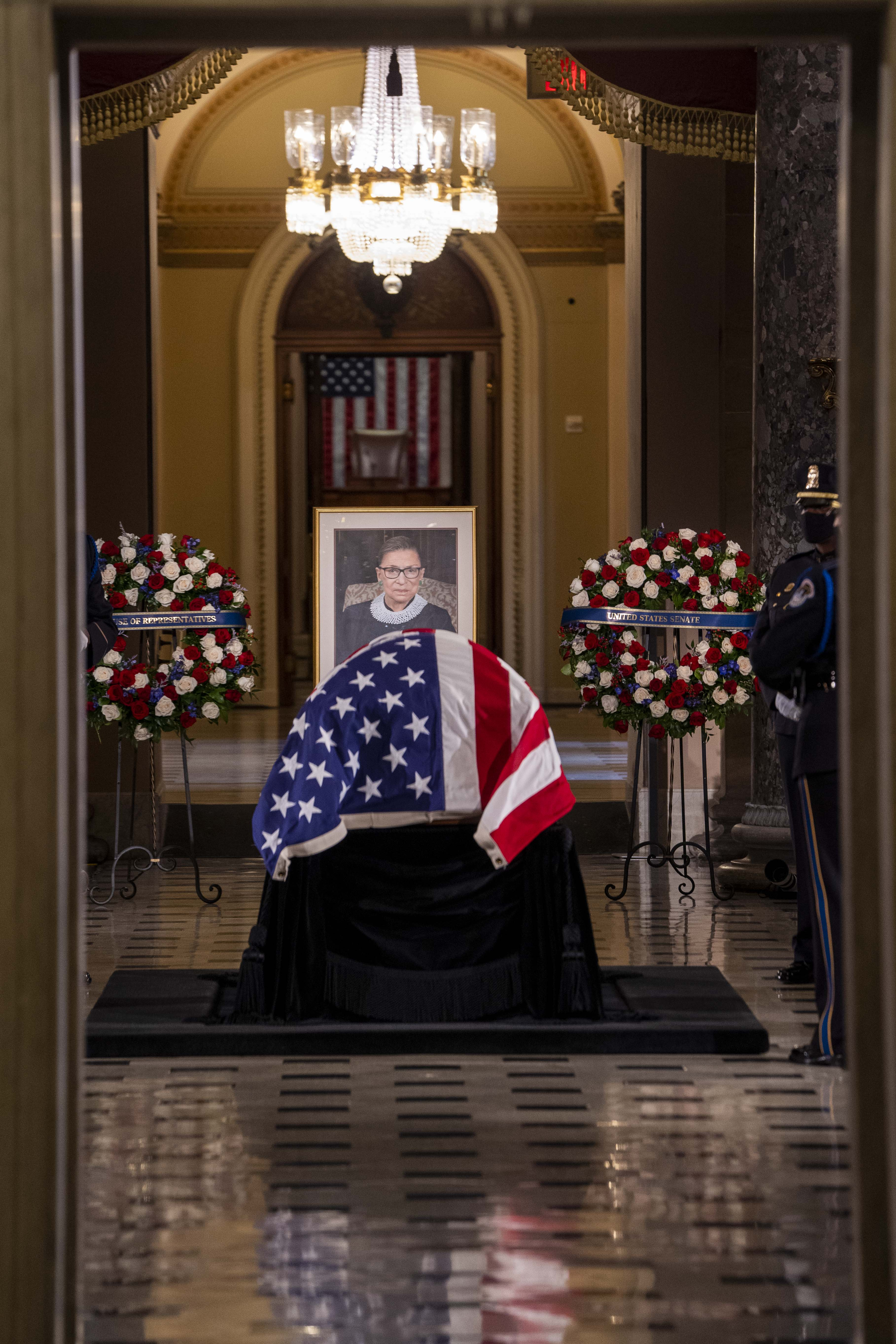
Ginsburg lay in state on September 25, 2020, at Statuary Hall in the United States Capitol.

Ginsburg lay in state at the United States Capitol on September 25; she is both the first Jewish person and the first woman to be thus honored. (Note: Not including possible unknown soldiers.) Ginsburg is the second justice to be honored in this way, the first being Chief Justice William Howard Taft, who had been the 27th president before being appointed to the court. Aside from lying in state, only one woman in history, civil rights movement leader Rosa Parks, had lain in honor at the US Capitol, in 2005 — a distinction given to private citizens, as opposed to government officials like Justice Ginsburg. That morning, Ginsburg's casket was placed in a hearse that transported it from the Supreme Court Building across the street to the Capitol. The hearse briefly paused before the Supreme Court before proceeding to the entrance of the Capitol.

At around 10 am, a US military honor guard carried the casket up the steps of the Capitol into the National Statuary Hall. The honor guard was led by Shaye Lynne Haver, one of the first two women to graduate from the US Army Ranger School. After the casket was again placed on Lincoln's catafalque, the military honor guard was replaced by an honor guard of four of the Capitol Police, who stood at the casket's four corners. Speaker Pelosi opened the ceremony with a speech honoring Ginsburg. This was followed by the mezzo-soprano Denyce Graves, one of Ginsburg's favorite opera singers, performing the spiritual "Deep River" accompanied by Laura Ward on piano. Holtzblatt, who had eulogized the justice two days earlier at the Supreme Court, gave another eulogy at the Capitol. Graves then sang Gene Scheer's "American Anthem". The ceremony concluded with the current and former lawmakers in attendance approaching the casket to pay their respects. While several Republicans attended the ceremony, McConnell and House minority leader Kevin McCarthy were not present. A US Army veteran who was Ginsburg's physical trainer, Bryant Johnson, later did three push-ups in front of the casket. An honor guard of at least two Capitol Police officers remained with the casket at all times while Ginsburg lay in state. At around 12:50 pm, the military honor guard brought the casket out of the Capitol, down the steps, and placed it into a hearse which, flanked by police vehicles, drove away from the Capitol plaza, thus concluding the publicly held honors for Ginsburg.

=== Arlington National Cemetery ===
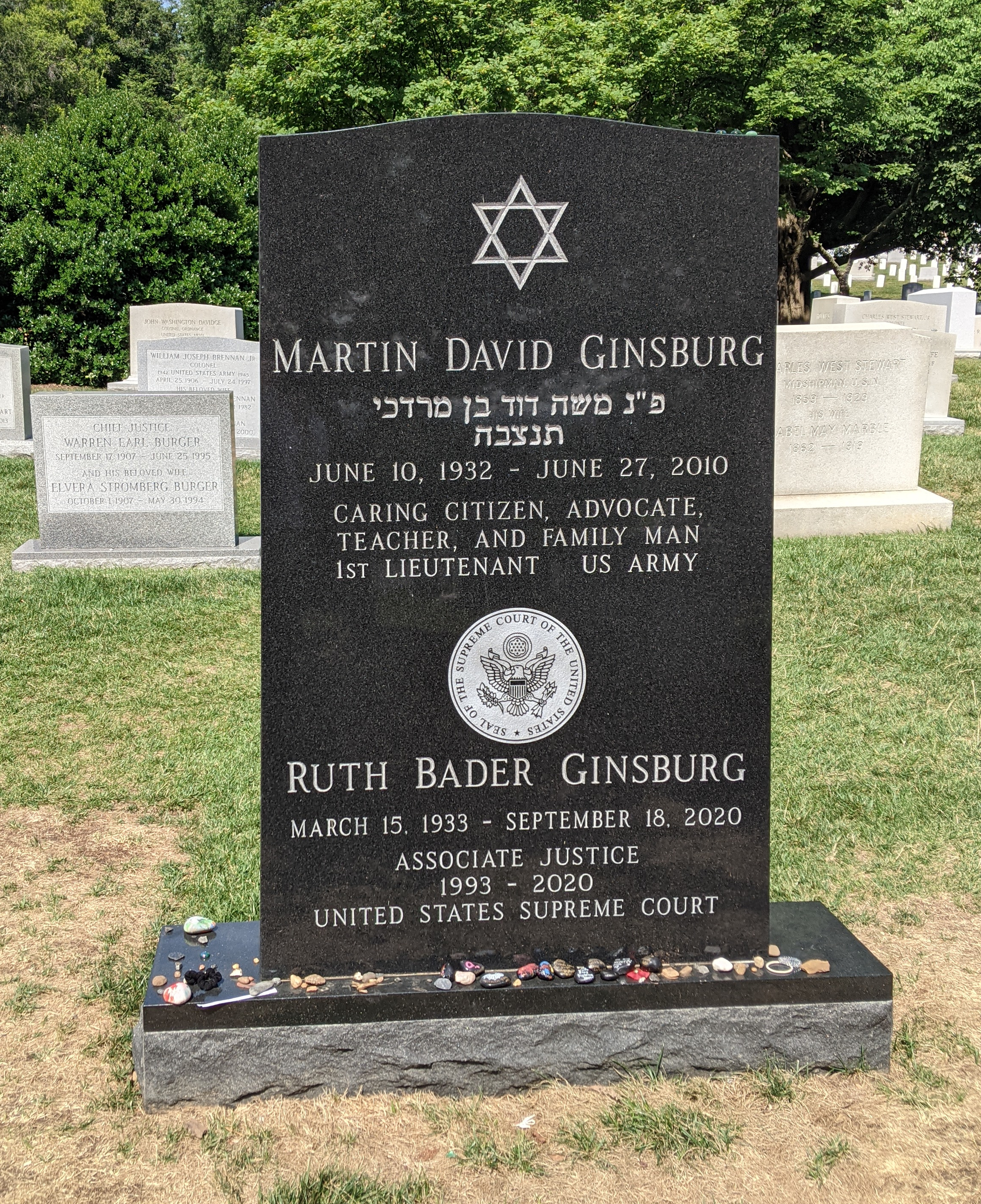
Ruth Bader Ginsburg grave marker

On September 29, a private funeral service was held at Arlington National Cemetery where Ginsburg was buried beside her husband, Martin D. Ginsburg, a US Army veteran. The ceremony was officiated by Holtzblatt with only "family, close friends, justices, and Ginsburg's staff" in attendance. The ceremony concluded with a playing of opera singer Leontyne Price singing two songs by Giacomo Puccini. The grave is located in Section 5 where nine other justices are also buried, including three with whom Ginsburg had served.

== Aftermath ==
In The Washington Post, James Hohmann wrote that the death of Ginsburg, and by proxy the upcoming confirmation hearings for her replacement on the United States Supreme Court, would have a "seismic" effect on the U.S. political landscape in the run-up to the 2020 United States presidential and Congressional elections. The Financial Times described Ginsburg's death as adding "uncertainty to [the] volatile election".

Ginsburg's death opened a vacancy on the Supreme Court about six weeks before the presidential election, causing controversies over the nomination and confirmation of her successor. The issue of abortion became a focal point of the election campaign after Ginsburg's death.

On the Republican side, President Trump's decision to quickly proceed with the nomination of a replacement for Ginsburg on the Supreme Court appeared to bring back together and energize the anti-abortion Evangelicals and conservatives, some of whom had begun to drift away from Trump. As a White House official told The Washington Post shortly after Ginsburg's death: "This is an animating issue for the entire right. It unifies everybody from Mitt Romney to the most hardcore MAGA Trump person out there at a time when Trump needed that."

In the hours following news of her death, more than $20 million was donated to various Democratic politicians via the ActBlue fundraising hub, more than quintuple the previous record amount. Donations through ActBlue were reported to be around $80 million within 24 hours and more than $100 million was donated over the four days immediately following Ginsburg's death. More than $20 million of that came in donations through a "Get Mitch or Die Trying" online campaign run by former Obama administration officials, who now host Pod Save America.

Many Democrats, angered by Trump's and McConnell's decision to proceed with the confirmation for Ginsburg's replacement so close to the election, especially in view of the promises made during the course of Merrick Garland's denied Supreme Court nomination in 2016, again discussed the possibility of increasing the size of the U.S. Supreme Court if the Democrats took control of the Presidency and the Congress after the November 2020 election.

Biden's presidential campaign sought to link Ginsburg's death with the ongoing COVID-19 pandemic and other healthcare issues, particularly the ongoing Supreme Court case California v. Texas regarding the fate of the Affordable Care Act (known as Obamacare), in which the court was set to hear arguments a week after the election date.

Legal analysts also noted that the loss of Ginsburg from the Supreme Court could significantly affect the outcome of various legal challenges related to the presidential election, including those related to absentee and mail voting. President Trump indicated that he specifically wanted Ginsburg's replacement on the Supreme Court to be confirmed by the November 3 election date because he expected the court to resolve the disputes about the election outcome. On September 26, Trump officially announced his nomination of Amy Coney Barrett.

== See also ==
- List of nominations to the Supreme Court of the United States
- Thurmond rule
