= Brooklyn Tower =

Supertall skyscraper in Brooklyn, New York

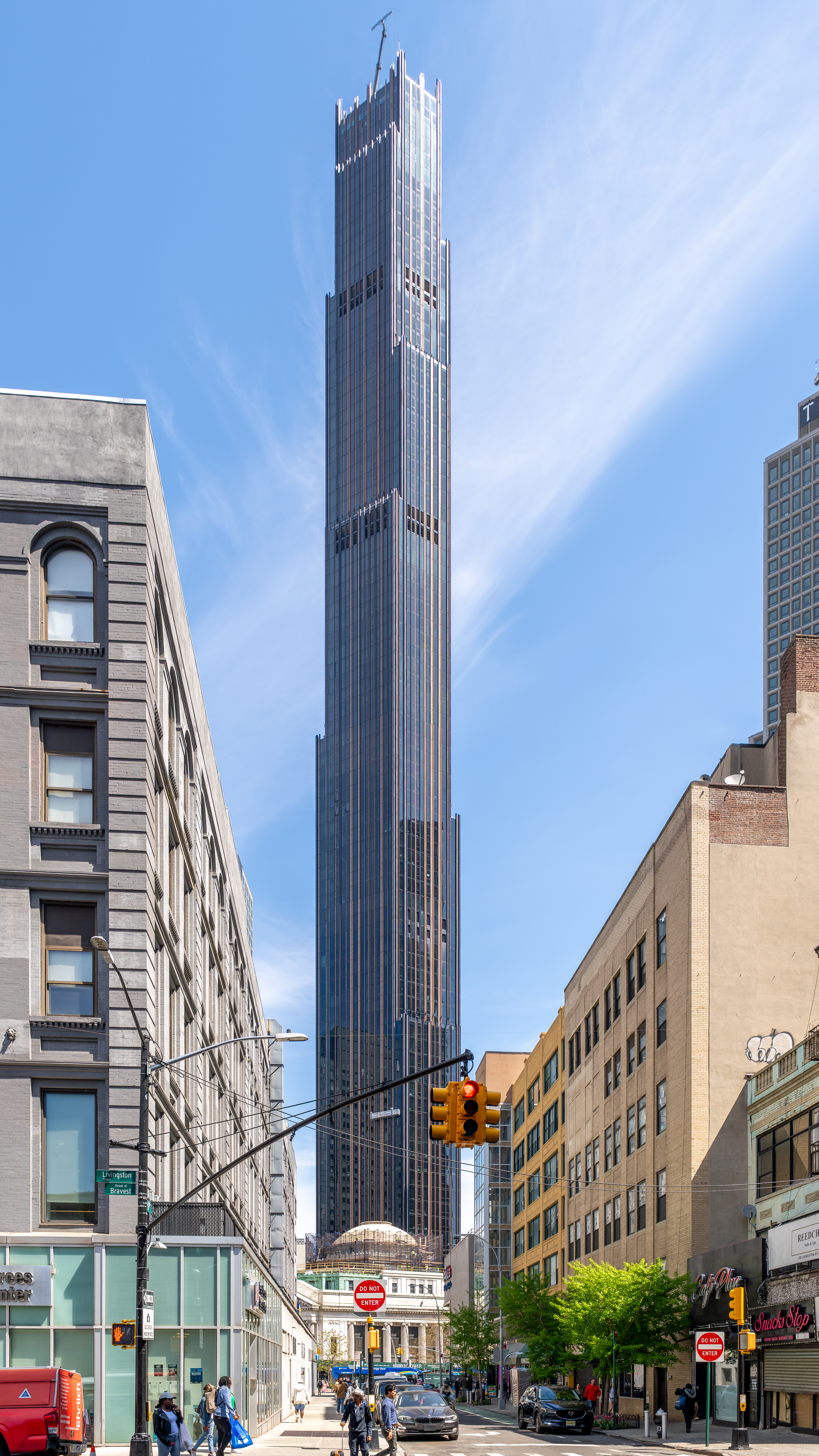
- The Brooklyn Tower and the Dime Savings Bank Building, seen down Bond Street (2026)
- Alternative names: 9 DeKalb Avenue, 340 Flatbush Avenue Extension, 85 Fleet Street

General information
- Status: Completed
- Type: Mixed-use
- Architectural style: Neo-Art Deco
- Location: 85 Fleet Street, Brooklyn, New York, U.S.
- Coordinates: 40°41′26″N 73°58′56″W
- Construction started: 2018 (residential tower); 1906 (bank)
- Topped-out: October 28, 2021
- Opened: 2022 (residential tower); December 19, 1908 (bank)

Height
- Roof: 1,035 feet (315 m) (Note: Elevation documents on file with the New York City Department of Buildings (DOB) give a height of 1,034.5 feet (315.3 m), which is rounded up to the nearest full foot. Documents filed with the Federal Aviation Administration give the height as 1,073 feet (327 m) above ground; this is the height from base to crown, as indicated by the DOB documents. Older sources predating the building's completion cite the height as 1,066 feet (325 m); this was the height given by news sources when the revised tower plans were announced in 2016.)

Technical details
- Floor count: 74 (Note: The New York City government's official website and the Skyscraper Center cite the building as having 74 physical stories. However, other sources describe it as a 93-story skyscraper.)
- Floor area: 555,734 sq ft (51,600 m^{2})

Design and construction
- Architects: SHoP Architects (residential tower); Mowbray and Uffinger (original structure)
- Developer: JDS Development
- Engineer: Jaros, Baum & Bolles (MEP on Tower)
- Structural engineer: WSP Global (Tower)
- Main contractor: JDS Construction

Website
- thebrooklyntower.com

New York City Landmark
- Designated: July 19, 1994
- Reference no.: 1907
- Designated entity: Bank facade

New York City Landmark
- Designated: July 19, 1994
- Reference no.: 1908
- Designated entity: Bank interior

The Brooklyn Tower (formerly 340 Flatbush Avenue Extension and 9 DeKalb Avenue; also 85 Fleet Street) is a supertall mixed-use, primarily residential skyscraper in the Downtown Brooklyn neighborhood of New York City. Developed by JDS Development Group, it is situated on the north side of DeKalb Avenue near Flatbush Avenue. The main portion of the skyscraper is a 74-story, 1,035-foot (315 m) residential structure designed by SHoP Architects and built from 2018 to 2022. Preserved at the skyscraper's base is the Dime Savings Bank Building, designed by Mowbray and Uffinger, which dates to the 1900s and is a New York City designated landmark.

The tower is the first supertall building in Brooklyn, as well as the tallest building in the borough and the tallest in New York City outside Manhattan. The Dime Savings Bank Building contains a white-marble facade with colonnades; a diagonal entrance portico on Albee Square; and a domed roof. The bank's interior contains a hexagonal rotunda, which is used as retail space. The building includes 120,000 square feet (11,000 m^{2}) of amenity spaces, some of which are within the bank. The tower section accommodates approximately 150 condominiums and 425 rental apartments, totaling roughly 466,000 square feet (43,300 m^{2}).

The bank building was built in 1906–1908 for the Dime Savings Bank of Brooklyn. The original building, which operated as Dime Savings Bank's main branch for over a century, was expanded by Halsey, McCormack and Helmer in 1931–1932. The bank building was sold to JDS in 2014, and the Brooklyn Tower was constructed as an annex to the Dime Savings Bank starting in 2018. The tower's superstructure topped out during October 2021, and sales of the condominiums began in early 2022, with only 18 of 148 condos having been sold in its first two years through April 2024. After JDS then defaulted on one of its loans to Silverstein Properties, owned by Larry Silverstein, that firm took over the unsold condos and rental apartments in June 2024.

== Site ==
The Brooklyn Tower is situated at 85 Fleet Street, 9 DeKalb Avenue, and 340 Flatbush Avenue Extension in the Downtown Brooklyn neighborhood of New York City. The building's site occupies much of the triangular city block bounded by Fleet Street to the northwest, DeKalb Avenue to the south, and Flatbush Avenue Extension to the northeast. The southwest corner faces a pedestrian plaza at Albee Square, and the Brooklyn Tower wraps around a structure at 33 DeKalb Avenue to the southeast. The site covers 46,367 square feet (4,307.6 m^{2}), with a frontage of 219.92 feet (67.03 m) on Flatbush Avenue and a depth of 380.8 feet (116.1 m) from Flatbush Avenue to Fleet Street.

The building is adjacent to other tall mixed-use developments, such as the three towers of City Point immediately to the west and One Willoughby Square one block west. The campus of LIU Brooklyn, including the Brooklyn Paramount Theater, is across Flatbush Avenue Extension to the east. The building stands across from an entrance to the DeKalb Avenue station of the New York City Subway's B, Q, and R trains. The Brooklyn Tower is within several blocks of the former tallest buildings in Brooklyn, Brooklyn Point and 11 Hoyt. Both were surpassed by the Brooklyn Tower in July 2021 when the latter's height reached 721 feet (220 m). The Brooklyn Tower exceeds the height of Brooklyn Point, the second-tallest building in Brooklyn as of 2022, by around 350 feet.

== Architecture ==
The Brooklyn Tower was developed by Michael Stern's JDS Development Group. The building has two components. The base includes the Dime Savings Bank Building, designed by Mowbray and Uffinger. The bank, built in 1906–1908 and expanded in 1931–1932, was designed in the Classical Revival style. Adjacent to the bank is the 1,035-foot (315 m), 74-story tower section, designed by SHoP Architects. The structure is the tallest building in Brooklyn, the tallest physically on Long Island, and the tallest in New York City outside Manhattan. WSP Global was the structural engineer for the tower, while Jaros, Baum & Bolles provided MEP engineering. The developer's in-house construction company, JDS Construction, was the lead contractor.

=== Form ===
The original bank building is shaped like a hexagon, with chamfered corners at the north, southwest, and southeast. When built, the bank's footprint measured 114 feet (35 m) on Fleet Street, 30 feet (9.1 m) on Albee Square, and 143 feet (44 m) on DeKalb Avenue. This was subsequently expanded to 202.17 feet (61.62 m) on Fleet Street, 46.90 feet (14.30 m) on the portico facing Albee Square, and 173.44 feet (52.86 m) on DeKalb Avenue. The Dime Savings Bank will be converted to a retail unit for the skyscraper.

The residential entrance faces Fleet Street, while the retail entrance is on Flatbush Avenue Extension. Glass entrances to the tower units are placed directly on both sides, leading to an atrium. The tower is designed in a hexagonal shape, evoking the motif used in the bank's ground-floor rotunda. At each of its six sides, the Brooklyn Tower has slight setbacks, which terminate in a crown.

=== Facade ===
==== Dime Savings Bank ====
The Dime Savings Bank's facade contains a water table made of pink granite, above which is a white-marble facade. This design was intended to give an impression of stability. The Dime Savings Bank was the first bank building in the United States to be clad in Pentelic marble. Some 2,000 tons of Pentelic marble were required for the bank's construction. The bank building is surmounted by a deep parapet, above which is the attic on the fifth story. The only sections of the bank without a marble facade are the rear (north) wall, as well as an attic on the eastern end of DeKalb Avenue. Both are made of buff-colored brick that is laid in common bond. The roof contains a smooth marble dome, which sits on a base of modillions and a hexagonal tholobate with acroteria.

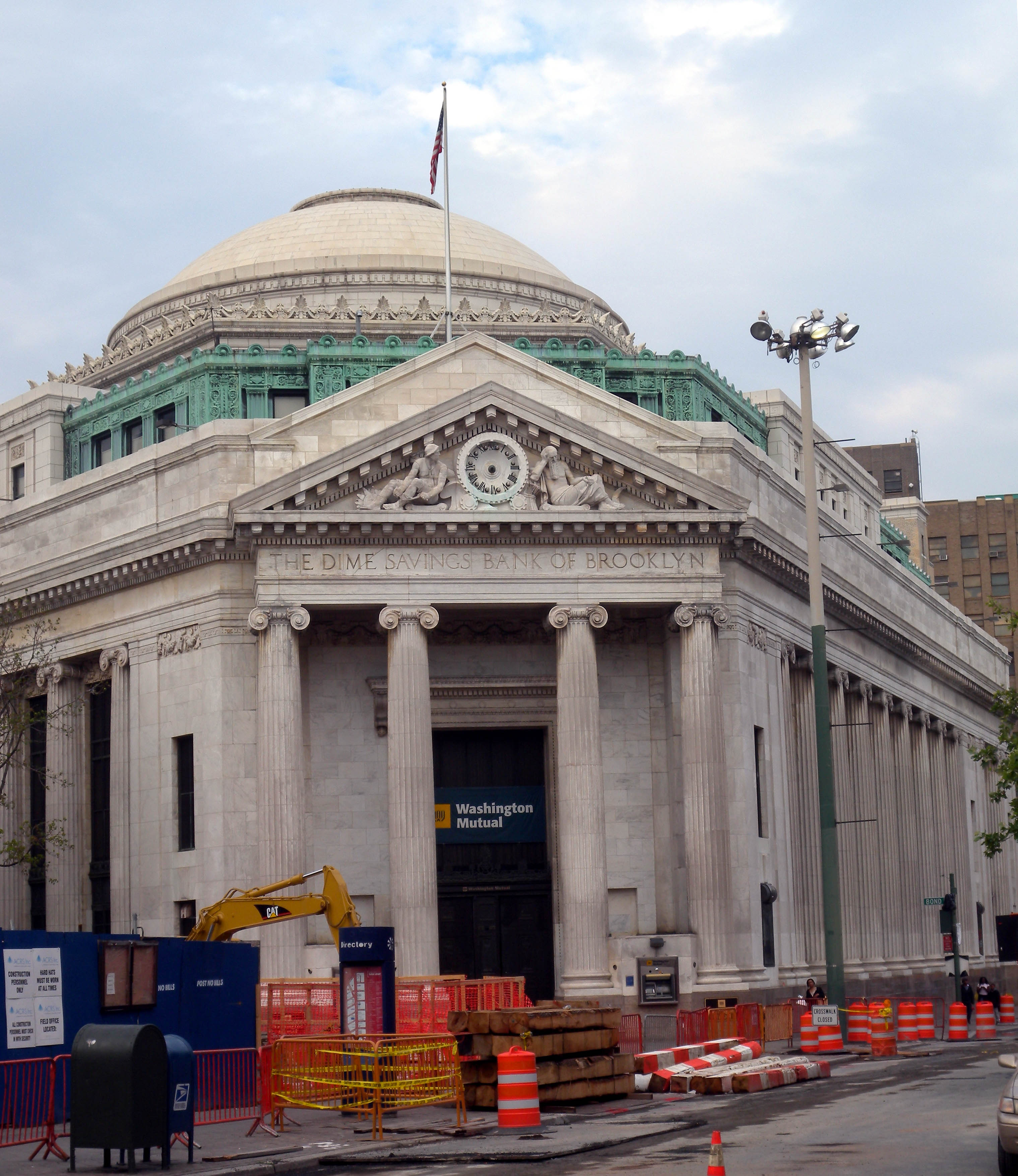
Main entrance detail, prior to the tower's construction (2009)

At the southwest corner of the building, a tetrastyle entrance portico faces the pedestrian plaza at Albee Square. Four Ionic columns support a frieze with the words "The Dime Savings Bank of Brooklyn" and a triangular pediment. Behind the columns, a stoop leads from the plaza to a multi-story opening, framed by a marble surround with acanthus leaf, bezant, and bead molding motifs. The bottom of the opening contains two single doors, which are divided by a trumeau with several panels. (Note: The lowest panel depicts the Brooklyn Bridge and modern skyscrapers, with the bank building in front. Above it is a full-figure depiction of the Roman god Mercury, as well as a depiction of Mercury's head. The top panel contains the words "No. 9", the building's address on DeKalb Avenue.) Directly above the doors are transom grilles, with panels depicting the god Mercury and various industry-related figures. Above this is an entablature, acroteria, and a large transom window. The opening is topped by a lintel with denticulation, flanked by scrolled brackets on either side. The portico's underside, or soffit, contains hexagonal panels. The pediment contains the carved sculptural group "Morning and Evening of Life", with personifications of a youthful "Morning" and an elderly "Evening". This pediment was designed by sculptor Lee Lawrie as part of the 1931–1932 renovation.

The Fleet Street and DeKalb Avenue facades are nearly identical, with colonnades of Ionic-style fluted columns, which divide each facade into bays. Within each bay is a tall opening with glazed window panes. Above the lowest row of windows are bronze spandrel panels, decorated with motifs of heads and flowers. The tops of each opening contain carved garlands of fruit. Above the colonnades, the attic level contains window openings, which are separated by pilasters and topped by a frieze with a Greek key pattern.

The colonnades on both facades are flanked by end bays, each of which contains a metal-framed window between a pair of marble pilasters. Rams' heads and garlands of fruit are carved at the top of each end bay, and the capital of each pilaster contains a Greek key pattern. At the eastern end of the DeKalb Avenue facade, there is an archway flanked by one-quarter columns. At the bottom of the archway are aluminum-framed doors, above which is a transom with bronze panels. The doors and bronze panels are surrounded by a marble archway, above which is a sign with the building's name and a dime with a Mercury cap. The top of the archway contains a keystone with a Mercury head. An end bay exists to the east of the archway.

==== Tower ====
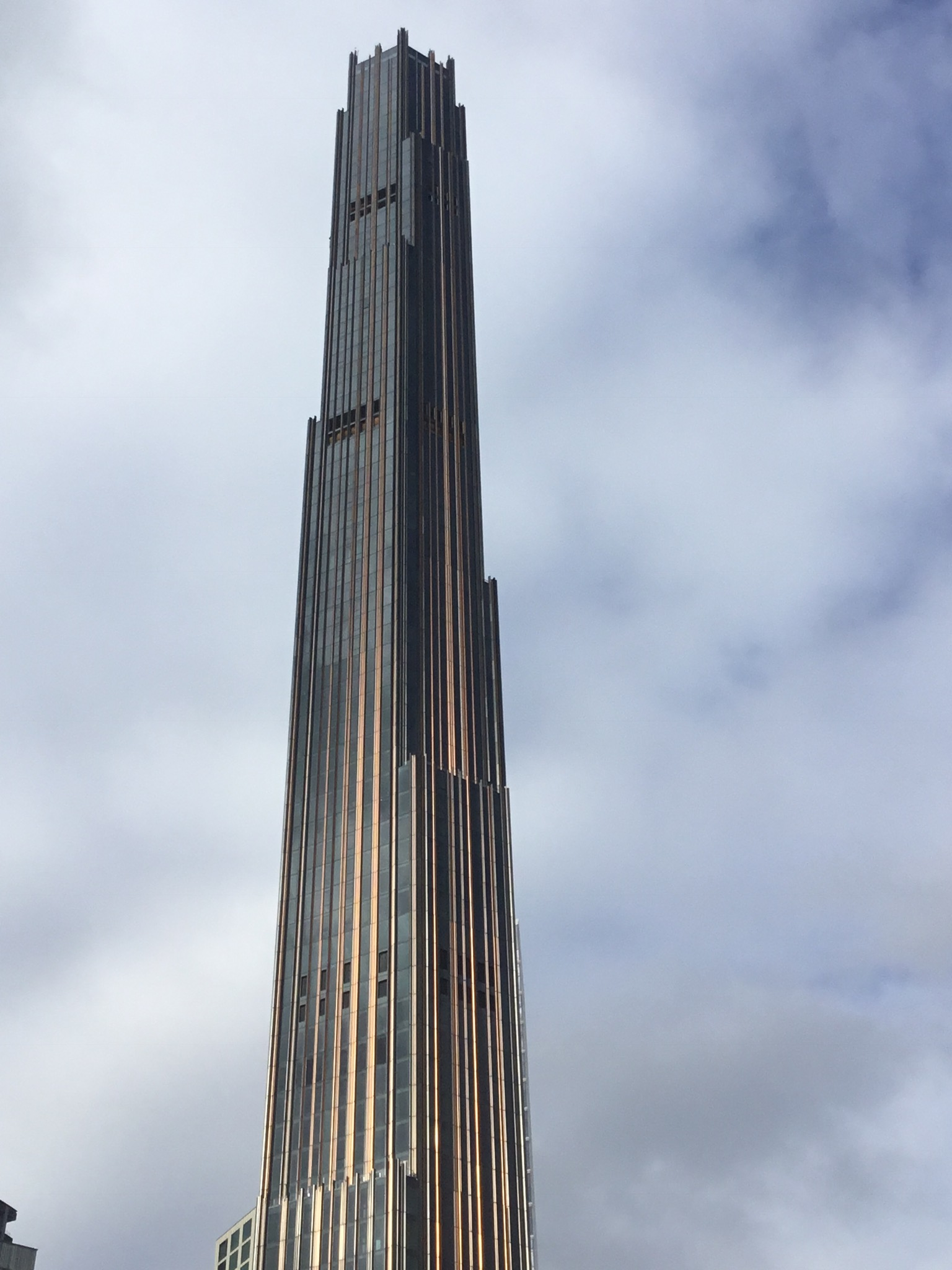
The tower's exterior in November 2022

The tower's exterior is clad in stone, bronze, and stainless steel, with hexagonal shafts interspersed throughout the facade. The design of the Dime Savings Bank Building inspired that of the tower; in particular, the hexagonal shape of the banking hall inspired the hexagonal massing of the tower. Gregg Pasquarelli, one of the principal architects at SHoP, has referred to the design as both "badass" and "quite elegant". According to Pasquarelli, the tower was intended to be "deferential to the landmark, but not derivative".

The base of the residential tower is clad in stone to complement the bank, and the facade gradually becomes darker as it rises. The spacing of the tower's vertical mullions is similar to the distance between each of the bank's columns. The mullions are extruded from the glass curtain wall and contain sharp edges at certain locations, giving the impression of a staggered facade. The exterior is designed in such a way that, when the tower is viewed from a certain angle, two adjacent sides will appear as though they are a single plane. This was a reference to older Art Deco skyscrapers such as the Chrysler Building and Rockefeller Center. Pasquarelli further emphasized the tower's Art Deco origins by describing the residential tower as the "Empire State Building of Brooklyn".

=== Interior ===
The Brooklyn Tower includes up to 140,000 square feet (13,000 m^{2}) of commercial space. The retail space includes one unit on the lower level and the first to fourth floors of the bank, covering around 50,000 square feet (4,600 m^{2}), as well as a second unit covering about 30,000 square feet (2,800 m^{2}). In addition, there is a commercial office space on the third floor of the tower section and a commercial gym on the fourth floor of both the tower and the bank. The interiors of the Brooklyn Tower's residential units were designed by Gachot Studios. Interior designer Krista Ninivaggi was responsible for designing the amenity interiors, and HMWhite was the landscape architect.

==== Banking hall ====
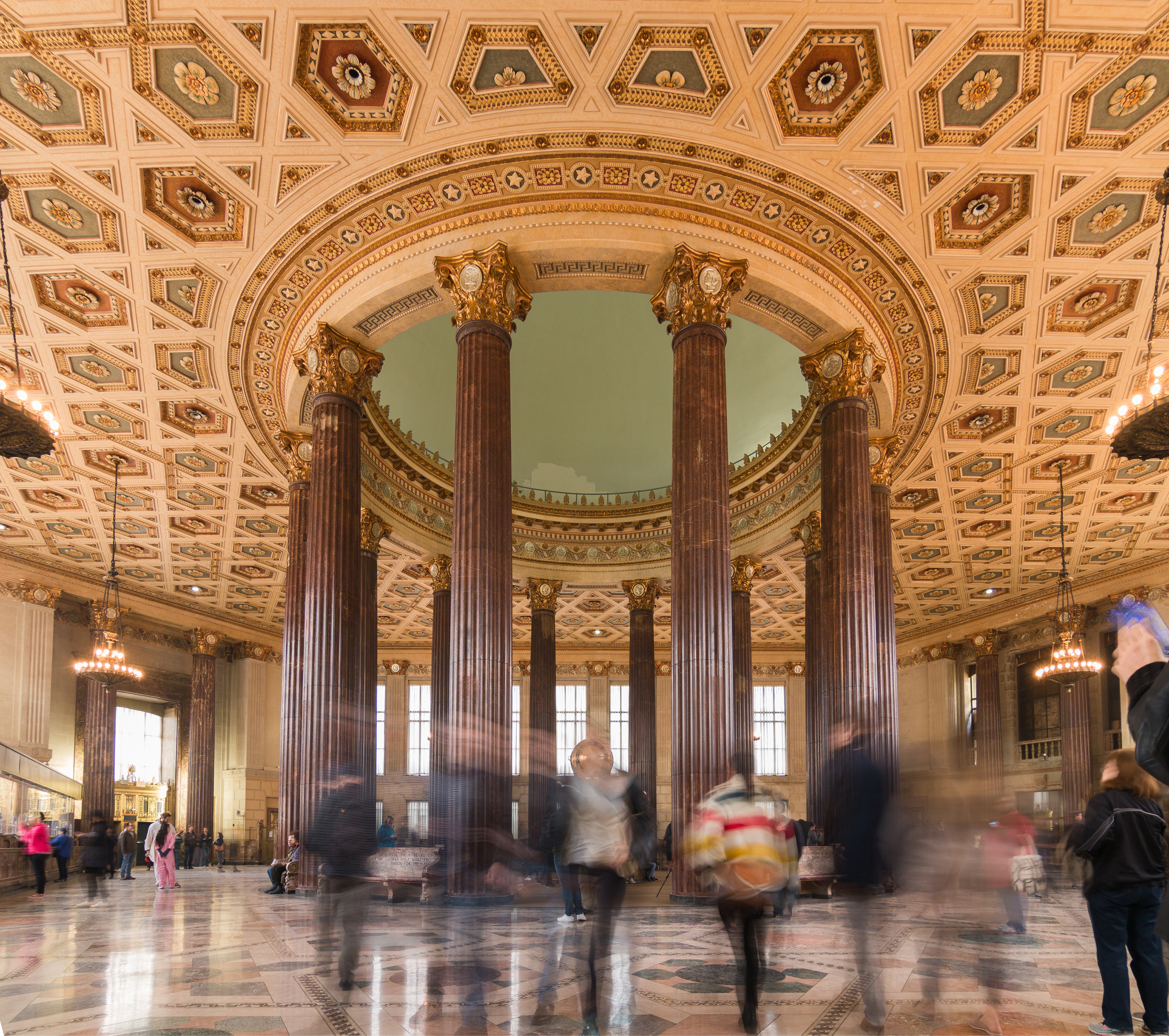
Interior of the banking room

The interior was originally clad in green marble. Initially, the banking room was much smaller, with a counter screen enclosing a triangle at the center of the room. The bank's original design included a gray Vermont marble floor and a cream-colored plaster wall. The original design had a stained-glass dome in the roof of the main banking room, measuring 40 feet (12 m) across. At the rear of the room was a vault door weighing 15 tons; a section of the floor had to be dropped every time the vault door opened. There was also a board of directors' room at the rear of the banking room. The subbasement had a shooting range for the bank's security guards, which is no longer in use.

The modern banking room is approximately a triangle that measures 160 feet (49 m) on each side. The banking room covers 16,750 square feet (1,556 m^{2}), with a ceiling measuring 40 feet (12 m) tall. Seven kinds of marble are used in the banking room. The marble floor contains star and hexagonal motifs. When the bank was in operation, there were pink- and black-marble tellers' counters along the sides of the room. The lower section of the walls is made of plain sandstone, and it contains openings with scrolled keystones above them. The sandstone wall is topped by a frieze with medallions that depict silver dimes with winged caps. Above the frieze are fluted pilasters that flank the tall windows from outside. The coffered ceiling has similar star and hexagon motifs to the floor. Surrounding the ceiling is a band, containing stars inside circles and flowers inside rectangles. In addition, six bronze chandeliers are suspended from the ceiling.

At the center of the banking room is a rotunda, which was added in the 1931–1932 expansion. The rotunda contains twelve red marble columns. The capitals of each column are gilded and are designed in the Corinthian order, with medallions of dimes. The columns hold up a decorated, multicolored entablature, which surrounds a sky-blue circular dome at the center. There are also pink marble benches at the columns' bases. Underneath the dome is a three-faced bronze clock, which stands on a black-marble pedestal and is encircled by a marble bench.

The banking room's southwest corner contains a pair of tall marble columns on either side of the main entrance. The southeast corner includes a pair of marble columns, between which a marble staircase leads down to a triangular lobby and a vestibule on DeKalb Avenue. The DeKalb Avenue lobby has walls with marble wainscoting and scalloped pilasters, above which runs a cornice with a Greek-key pattern. Ornamental screens are placed across doorways that lead from the lobby to the basement. The entrance vestibule has marble walls with bronze grilles. Both spaces contain coffered ceilings. Above the lobby and vestibule is the Ladies' Lounge, which overlooks the banking room. The lounge's floor is similar in design to the hexagonal floor of the banking room. The walls contain marble wainscoting and wallpaper, topped by a multicolored cornice.

==== Lobby and amenities ====
The double-height residential lobby on Fleet Street has white oak walls. Designed by the firm of Woods Bagot, the residential lobby contains milled wooden panels interspersed with wooden slats, as well as wood veneers. The lobby also contains some stone surfaces and a vaulted ceiling, both of which were intended to reference the design of the banking hall.

The building contains 120,000 square feet (11,000 m^{2}) of amenity spaces. The main amenity spaces span the fifth and sixth floors. The tower's fifth floor includes an outdoor terrace wrapping around the bank's dome. There are three swimming pools on the roof of the bank building. A cocktail bar and a lounge are placed next to the pool area. This area is called The Dome Pool and Terrace. The building also has a fourth swimming pool within an indoor fitness center. The indoor pool consists of a whirlpool and a 75-foot-long (23 m) lap pool. The amenity areas also have a conference room, meeting room, dining room, kitchen, billiards room, and movie room for residents. The gym space covers over 36,000 square feet (3,300 m^{2}). These spaces are managed by Life Time Fitness. Above this area is a mechanical space measuring 24 feet (7.3 m) high.

A 66th-floor recreational area and an 85th-floor lounge are also included in the building. The basketball court on the 66th floor was advertised as the tallest residential basketball court in the world. The basketball court was designed with a similar color palette to that of the Barclays Center nearby. Also included on this level is a dog run, a Foosball space, and an outdoor playground. The 66th floor is open to the outdoors on all sides, allowing wind to pass through the building and reducing sway on upper floors.

==== Tower units ====
The tower accommodates approximately 150 condominiums and 425 apartments for rent, encompassing roughly 466,000 square feet (43,300 m^{2}). (Note: The number of rental apartments has alternatively been cited as 400 or 450.) The condominium apartments start on the 52nd or 53rd story and are more than 500 feet (150 m) above ground level. Before the Brooklyn Tower was completed, in 2022, several designers were hired to create three model apartments, each with different furnishings and decorations. The smallest apartments are studio apartments, while larger units have up to three bedrooms. There is one full-floor unit: the penthouse, which has four bedrooms. The penthouse is variously cited as measuring 5,100 square feet (470 m^{2}) or 5,900 square feet (550 m^{2}) across.

With a mix of residential units planned as rental properties, the developers applied for tax breaks through the state's 421-a tax exemption program in 2015, prior to that program's expiration, which would require dedicating at least twenty percent of the building's units as affordable housing. As such, 30 percent of the Brooklyn Tower's total apartments were allocated to affordable housing, to which prospective residents could apply using New York state's housing lottery system. The affordable apartments largely consist of studios or one-bedroom apartments and are available to residents who earn at most 130 percent of the median income of the surrounding ZIP Codes. Only 19 of the affordable apartments have more than one bedroom.

Each unit uses marble, bronze, and stainless steel finishes, similar to the materials used on the tower's exterior. The units contain wooden doors with mahogany finishes and brass hardware, as well as brass sconces and black-granite doorways. The kitchens include bronze details and finishes, as well as appliances from Miele, including refrigerators, dishwashers, ovens, and washer-dryers. Also included within the kitchens are black and bronze cabinetry with countertops made of marble or black granite. The kitchen drawers are not equipped with handles, which was intended to emphasize the space's open-plan design. The bathrooms contain hexagonal floor tiles and walls made of marble, as well as glass sconces on medicine cabinets. Each condominium has full-height windows measuring 11 feet (3.4 m) tall. Due to the tower's hexagonal massing, the walls in each apartment are generally not parallel to each other.

== History ==
=== Bank building ===
==== Construction ====
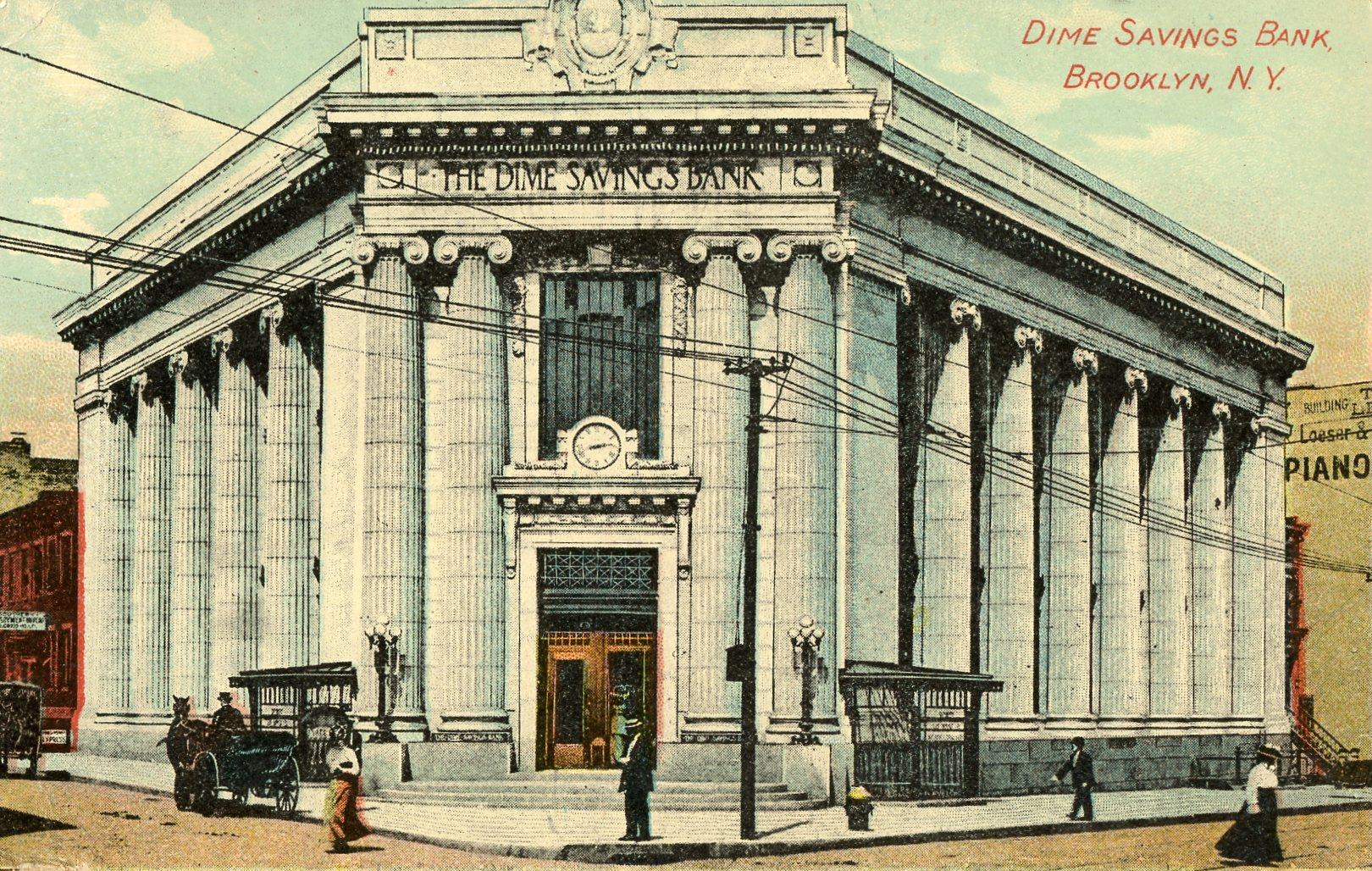
1912 postcard

The Dime Savings Bank of Brooklyn was chartered in 1859; its name referenced the fact that clients could originally create an account with as little as a dime. The bank's home office moved several times in the late 19th century as the city of Brooklyn grew. By the 1900s, Brooklyn was part of the City of Greater New York, and transportation and businesses were expanding into the area east of Brooklyn Borough Hall (including what is now Albee Square). A new home-office building for the Dime Savings Bank at DeKalb Avenue and Fleet Street was announced in September 1905. The irregular site had cost $230,000 to acquire.

Work started in 1906 to designs by Mowbray and Uffinger. John Thatcher and Sons were the general contractors on the project. The bank's Pentelic marble was supplied by an English syndicate, which reopened the ancient marble quarries shortly before the bank was built. The building cost $600,000, including the cost of the site. The New-York Tribune said the bank was the "first institution of importance to cross to the far side of DeKalb Avenue", at a time when the shopping district of Downtown Brooklyn was largely south of DeKalb Avenue. The Dime Savings Bank moved to its DeKalb Avenue building on December 19, 1908.

==== Expansion and later years ====
The Dime Savings Bank's home office was expanded in 1918 to designs by Russell S. Walker. The addition at 67–73 Fleet Street, measuring 71 by 57 feet (22 by 17 m), complemented the original design of the bank on DeKalb Avenue and Fleet Street. The Dime Savings Bank opened its first bank branch in Bensonhurst in 1929, followed by a second branch in Flatbush in 1932. To keep up with this growth, the bank hired Halsey, McCormack and Helmer (now Mancini Duffy) to design a significant expansion of its central branch, which was built from 1931 to 1932. For this expansion, Halsey, McCormack and Helmer received an "outstanding building" award from the Brooklyn Chamber of Commerce, as did general contractor William Kennedy Construction Company. The Dime Savings Bank was authorized to sell life insurance in September 1941. To accommodate the new life-insurance department and expanded offices for other departments, the bank built an annex with five stories and a basement along Flatbush Avenue Extension.

The Dime Savings Bank opened a permanent exhibit for homebuyers on the sixth floor of its building in 1944, with more than 42,000 visitors in its first year. A free exhibit for homebuyers opened on the second floor in 1948 and was relocated to the main floor, adjacent to the rotunda, in 1949; it had 250,000 visitors in five years. The bank building also hosted other events, such as an orchid show in 1954 and a showcase of artwork by Pablo Picasso in 1962. The tellers' windows on the sidewalk started operating on Saturdays in 1956, making Dime's 9 DeKalb Avenue branch the only bank building in the city to operate during Saturdays. The next year, Dime renovated the homebuyers' exhibit next to the rotunda.

Paul Goldberger wrote for The New York Times in 1986 that "no other grandiose bank teaches us so fine a lesson in urban design" as the Dime Savings Bank Building. The New York City Landmarks Preservation Commission hosted public hearings in June 1993 to determine whether to designate the Dime Savings Bank's facade and interior, along with three other banks in Brooklyn and two in Manhattan, (Note: The others were the Williamsburgh Savings Bank Tower, Williamsburgh Savings Bank Building (175 Broadway), Brooklyn Trust Company Building, Bowery Savings Bank Building (130 Bowery), and Bowery Savings Bank Building (110 East 42nd Street).) as city landmarks. The New York City Landmarks Preservation Commission (LPC) designated the bank building as a city landmark on July 19, 1994. Dime was acquired by Washington Mutual in 2002 and then by JPMorgan Chase in 2008. Subsequently, the 9 DeKalb Avenue building was used as a JPMorgan Chase branch.

=== Development of residential tower ===
==== Site acquisition ====
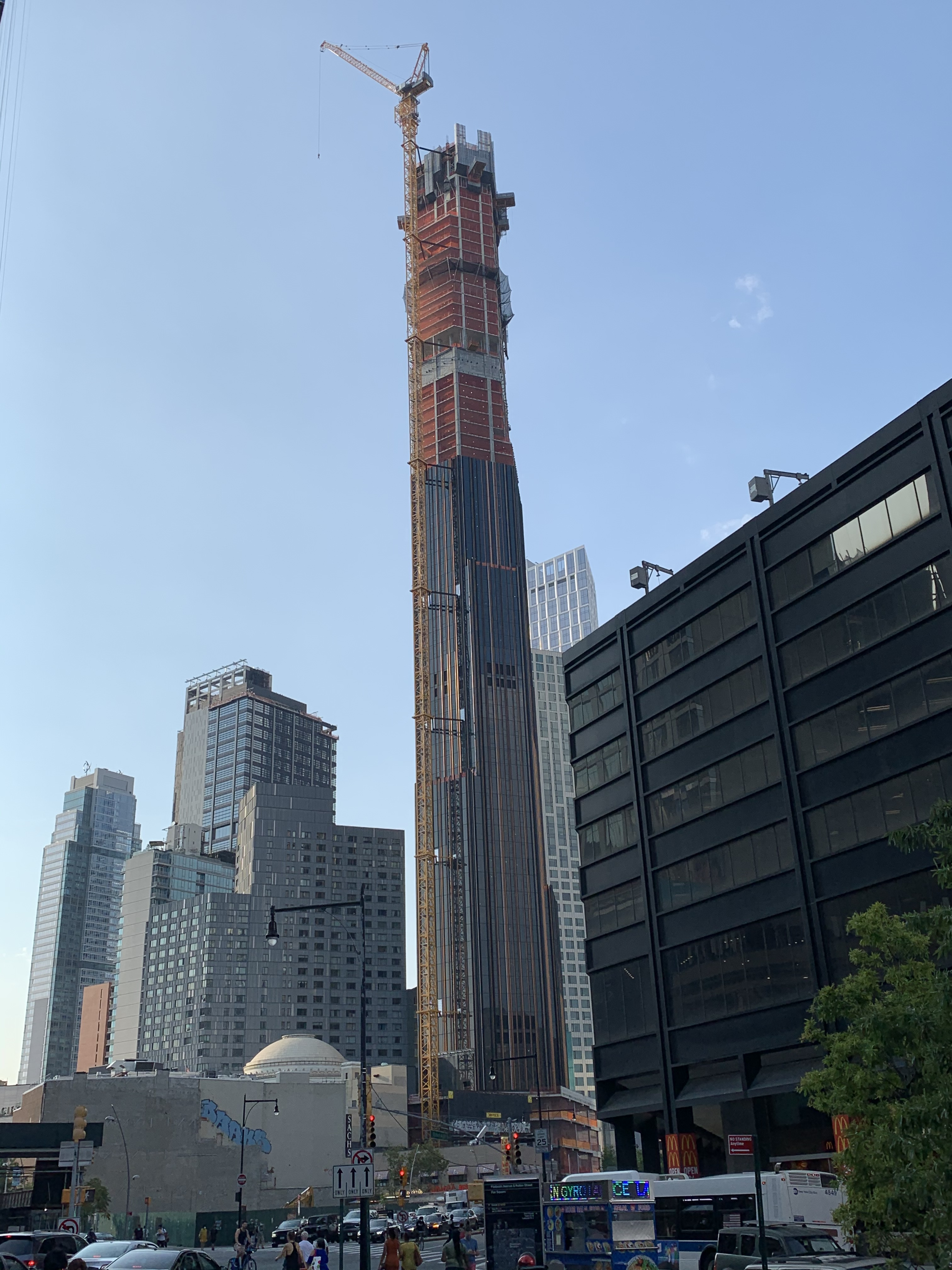
The tower under construction, looking north from Flatbush Avenue and Fulton Street

In 2004, the New York City Department of City Planning approved a significant rezoning for portions of Downtown Brooklyn. This resulted in major expansion of office space and ground-floor retail, such as those at City Point. JDS and Joseph Chetrit's Chetrit Group went into contract to buy 340 Flatbush Avenue Extension, a six-story office structure adjoining the Dime Savings Bank, in late 2013. The sale was finalized in June 2014, with Chetrit and JDS paying $43.5 million.

JDS and Chetrit also planned to acquire a two-story building at DeKalb and Flatbush Avenues, occupied by cheesecake restaurant Junior's, to use its air rights. The deal would have amounted to approximately 20 stories of additional space in the new building. The Junior's restaurant, which opened in 1950, was a popular restaurant within Brooklyn. Alan Rosen, the owner of the Junior's building, placed it for sale in February 2014, with a stipulation that any buyer reopen a Junior's restaurant at the ground floor. Rosen also received a higher offer, worth about $45 million, that would have required Junior's to leave the site. After complaints from customers who feared that the store would be closed, Rosen ultimately decided against selling his building in September 2014.

Meanwhile, JPMorgan Chase had expressed interest in selling the Dime Savings Bank's air rights to JDS and Chetrit in April 2014. This would add about 385,000 square feet (35,800 m^{2}) of developable space, or about 30 stories. According to The New York Times, if JDS and Chetrit were able to acquire all the air rights on the block, then a skyscraper of more than 1,000 feet could be erected on the site. Plans for the structure were first filed in the middle of that year, calling for a 70-story, 775-foot building designed by SHoP Architects. The building marked the third collaboration between JDS and SHoP, after 111 West 57th Street and the American Copper Buildings.

==== Financing and approval ====
In December 2015, Fortress Investment Group provided a $115 million loan to JDS and Chetrit Group for the purchase of the site and for the refinancing of debt associated with the Dime Savings Bank property. At the time, the bank was expected to be sold for over $100 million. The same month, JDS and Chetrit acquired the Dime Savings Bank Building from JPMorgan Chase for $90 million using the money from the refinancing. This was part of a trend during the early 21st century, when many old bank buildings across the United States were converted to residential structures.

JDS and Chetrit released a modified plan in early 2016, increasing the height slightly while reducing the amount of retail space. Under the new plans, the tower was to be 1,066 feet tall. Brooklyn Community Board 2's land-use committee quickly endorsed the project. Because the proposed skyscraper involved modifying the landmarked bank building, JDS and Chetrit needed to obtain permission from the LPC, which approved the proposed modifications in April 2016. Changes include the removal of non-original additions to the bank, repairing damage to the bank's marble and copper elements, and demolishing part of the bank's rear to make way for the new residential addition. When the plans were approved, some observers objected to the height and to the shadows cast by the new building. However, the community as a whole presented little opposition to the plans.

In February 2017, Bank OZK and Melody Finance issued a $135 million bridge and pre-development loan for the project. The loan replaced Fortress's debt and previous funding from the Kushner Companies. Work on 9 DeKalb Avenue's foundation began that June. JDS invested an additional $60 million in equity in August 2018 to purchase Chetrit's stake in the property, obtaining full ownership of the project. Thirty percent of the building's apartments were classified as affordable housing, allowing JDS to claim a 35-year tax abatement for the building. Unidentified real-estate professionals, interviewed by the website Curbed, expressed skepticism over whether people were willing to pay the average asking price of $2,300 per square foot ($25,000/m^{2}) for 9 DeKalb Avenue's apartments. At the time, the building was far from the more upscale areas of Manhattan where people paid almost three times that rate.

==== Construction and issues ====
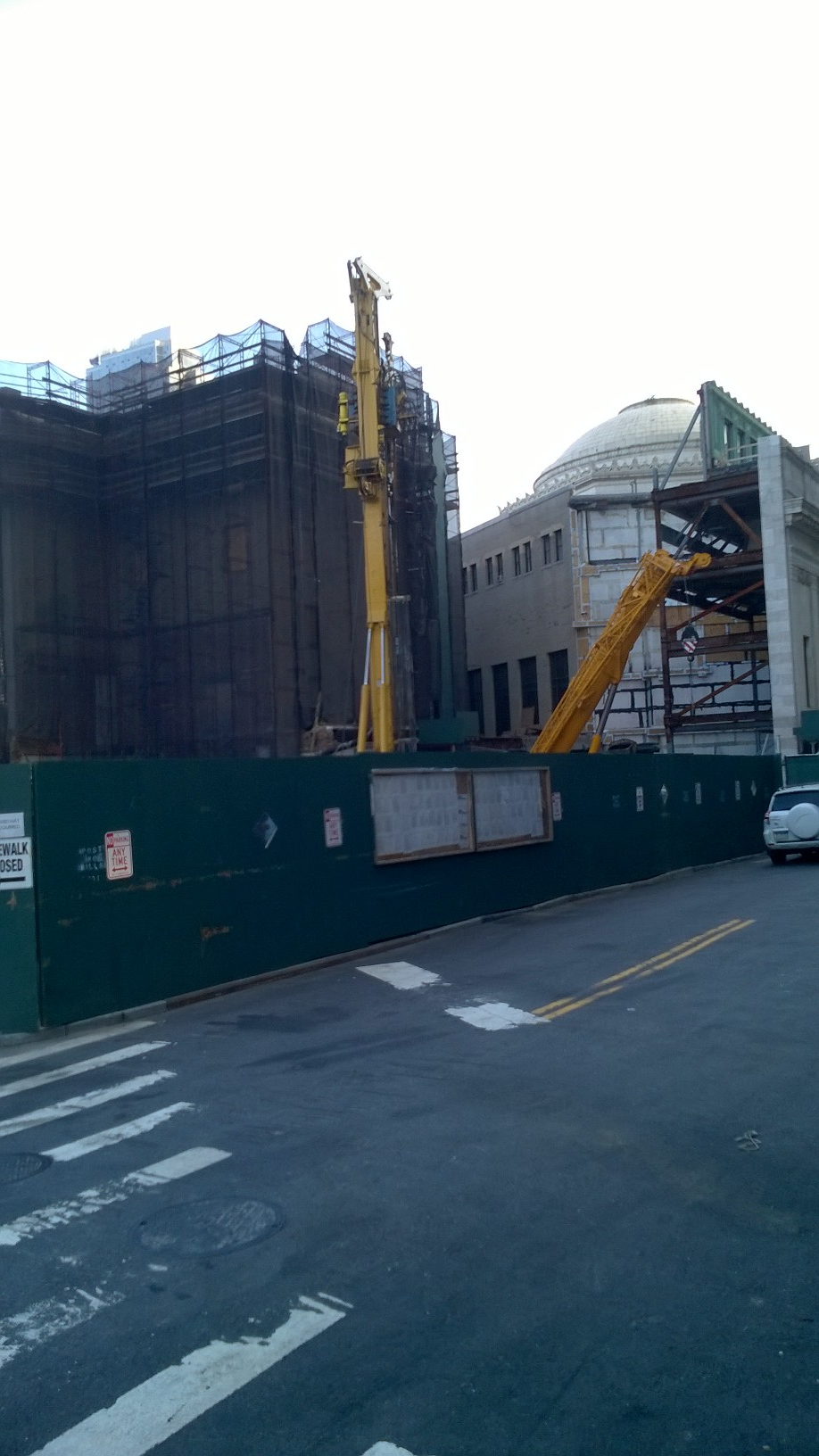
Initial stage of the tower's construction, August 2017

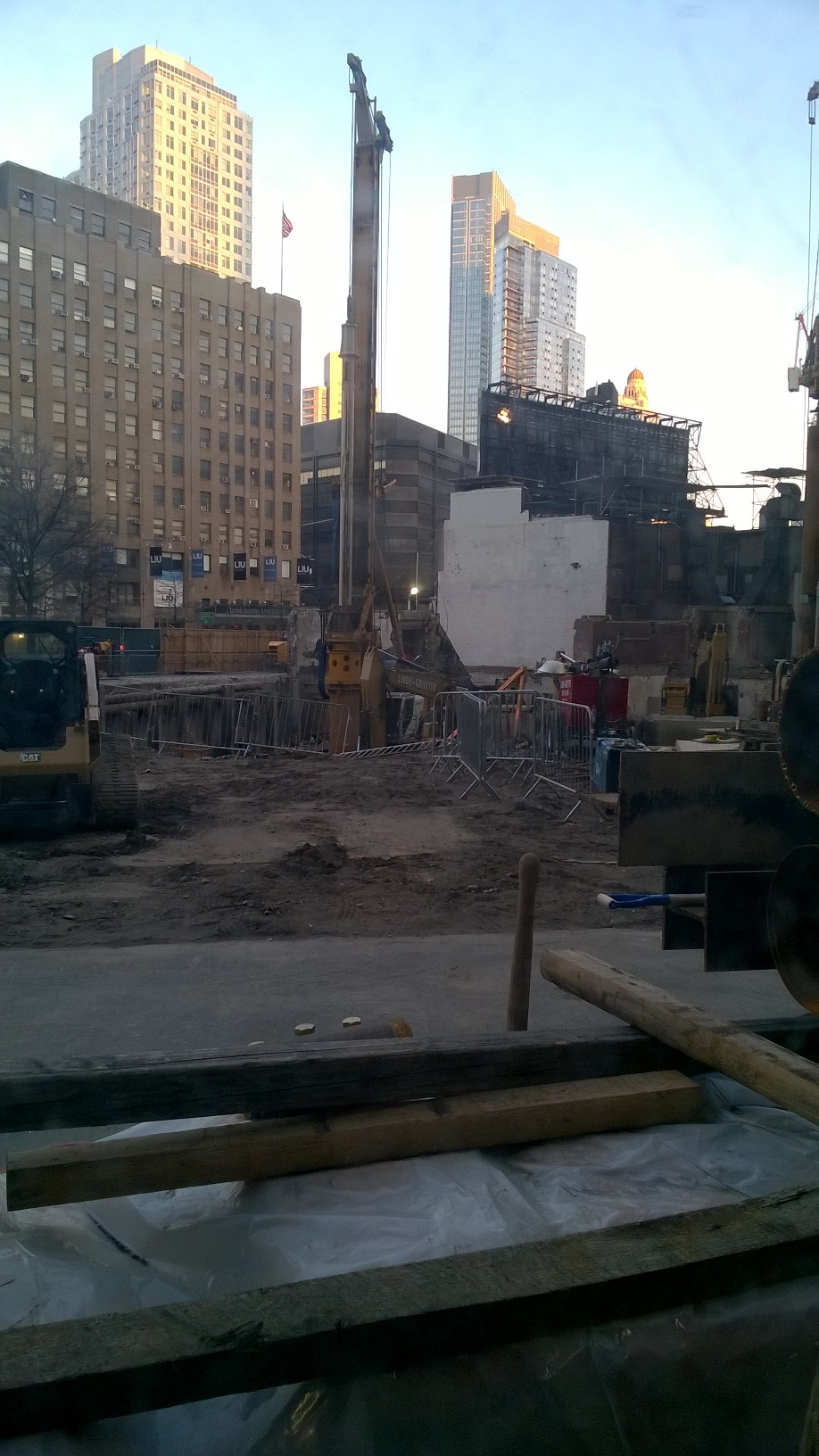
9 DeKalb Avenue construction site, April 2019

Construction of the above-ground superstructure began in mid-2018. In November 2018, Silverstein Properties' debt fund Silverstein Capital was reported to be nearing a $240 million mezzanine loan for the project, in addition to $400 million in additional debt from a senior lender. The loan closed in April 2019, along with a $424.1 million senior loan from Otéra Capital. This represented a total loan of $664.1 million. At the time, banks were increasingly hesitant to finance luxury apartments because they were concerned an oversupply of such apartments; the lenders said that the project had appealed to them because of its complexity. Due to the COVID-19 pandemic in New York City, the building's completion was pushed back by around four months. The concrete core had reached 28 stories by November 2020, and the curtain wall was installed starting the next month. The skyscraper reached its halfway point in April 2021. As of July 2021, the Brooklyn Tower had surpassed 721 feet (220 m), making it the tallest building in Brooklyn.

The building topped out on October 28, 2021. By then, sales were projected to start in early 2022, with a temporary certificate of occupancy being issued by the end of 2022. After the building topped out, the global supply chain crisis slowed down the delivery of several finishes, as well as hardware such as doors. By February 2022, the facade installation had reached the upper residential floors. Chetrit sued JDS that month, claiming that he was still owed $17.9 million after he sold his stake to JDS over three years prior. That March, sales launched on the condos above the 52nd floor. The cheapest condos were studios costing $875,000 while the most expensive were four-bedroom apartments costing $8 million. At the time, real estate consultants said potential buyers might have had some concerns because of mechanical and safety issues at another supertall building in Manhattan, 432 Park Avenue. Marketproof executive Kael Goodman expressed optimism that the building's units would be sold quickly. Although exterior construction was substantially completed by 2022, the building did not receive a permanent Certificate of Occupancy until April 25, 2025.

Near the end of construction in March 2022, The New York Times reported on Stern's claims that the Brooklyn Tower would not sway in the wind like Manhattan's skinny supertalls were notorious for doing. "Sometimes there are growing pains [...] I think we've learned all those lessons already", said Stern. Nonetheless, the Brooklyn Tower was observed to be swaying back and forth in high winds less than two years later. Video of the tower aggressively swaying from side to side in a time lapse was viewed by millions across social media.

==== Opening ====
The tower's entrance on Flatbush Avenue

The developers hired broker Jackie Totolo in early 2022 to market the retail space. That May, Life Time Fitness became the building's first commercial tenant, leasing 100,000 square feet (9,300 m^{2}) as a fitness center and coworking space. Life Time was to operate the building's amenity spaces as part of its lease agreement. The construction crane was being disassembled by April 2022, and workers were installing the final facade panels on the crown two months later. The facade was largely completed by October 2022. JDS had planned to begin accepting applications for rental apartments in August 2022, but the application process had not started by that October. The Brooklyn Tower's crown was completed in February 2023. The next month, Stern placed the 368 rental apartments and the retail space for sale, asking $600 million to $700 million for these portions of the building. By then, the building was planned to receive a temporary certificate of occupancy. A housing lottery for 120 of the apartments commenced that April. By mid-2023, the amenity spaces were expected to open the next year.

In December 2023, Silverstein Capital Partners took over the building's senior loan from Otéra Capital. The podium was being finished at the beginning of 2024, and tenants had started moving in. One of the building's studio apartments sold for over $2,000 per square foot ($22,000/m^{2}) in early 2024, becoming the most expensive studio apartment ever sold in Brooklyn per square foot. At the time, the rental apartments were being marketed for over $5,000 per month. That March, JDS Development defaulted on one of the building's mezzanine loans (valued at $240 million), and Silverstein Capital Partners indicated that it would sell the retail and rental-apartment portions of the building at a foreclosure auction. Public records indicated that only 18 out of 148 condos had been sold at the time. During June, Silverstein and JDS began negotiating a settlement to avoid foreclosure. Ultimately, Silverstein paid $672 million to take over the unsold apartments from JDS the next month.

Work on the podium continued through late 2024, and Silverstein was planning to resume apartment sales by early 2025. By March 2025, either 19 or 23 of the condos had been sold, and residents reported that they went into vacant units just to enjoy the views. Life Time downsized its lease that month, agreeing to occupy an 80,000-square-foot (7,400 m^{2}) health club on seven floors. Condo sales resumed in June 2025, with Corcoran Sunshine as the real-estate brokerage; the units were advertised as being at 85 Fleet Street. At the time, the fitness center was still not open, and early residents instead received temporary off-site gym memberships and partial common charge credits. The penthouse was placed for sale that December; it remained unsold in April 2026. That September, an arbitrator ordered Stern to pay Silverstein $47 million in penalties.

== Reception ==
When the Brooklyn Tower was being built, a writer for Wallpaper magazine wrote that the tower's design "was a sublime mix of interlocking forms and cascading setbacks". In 2022, the design for the tower's residential lobby and amenity spaces by Woods Bagot was named a honoree in the "On the Boards: Multi-Family Residence" category of Interior Design magazine's Best of Year Awards. Architectural Digest referred to the design of the tower as "neo Art Deco". A CNN reporter wrote: "The building has had a striking effect on the borough's architecture, from its soaring height to its bold exterior of fluted black stainless steel." Architectural critic Justin Davidson wrote for Curbed in August 2023 that while the lower facade's "geometric gamesmanship has a Baroque intensity", on the upper stories, "patterns and proportions shift along the way, creating a restless energy you can sense even from a distance". Davidson cited the Seagram Building, the Woolworth Building, and the original Dime Savings Bank Building as having influenced the residential tower's design. In discussing both the Brooklyn Tower and 130 William Street in Manhattan, Davidson wrote, "The designs express not just an abundance of money, but a distinct architectural philosophy: The city can tolerate personality." Alexandra Lange of Bloomberg News wrote that the Brooklyn Tower, along with the neighboring 100 Flatbush, were reminiscent of the 1930s Art Deco architecture of New York City.

Kim Velsey of Curbed wrote in April 2024 that, when the building was being built, it garnered criticism from real-estate professionals who felt that the tower would be more suited to Billionaires' Row in Manhattan. Writers from The Architect's Newspaper and The Financial Times said that many locals have compared it to the Tower of Sauron from the Lord of the Rings franchise, saying that it "exudes a certain menace." That year, the international Council on Tall Buildings and Urban Habitat gave the Brooklyn Tower the Award of Excellence in the "Best Tall Building 300 Meters and Above" category. Cara Greenberg wrote in Dezeen website that the Brooklyn Tower helped revitalize Brooklyn's skyline and that, prior to the tower's construction, "Brooklyn labored under a stubborn inferiority complex" as compared with Manhattan.

== See also ==
- List of tallest buildings in Brooklyn
- List of tallest buildings in New York City
- List of New York City Designated Landmarks in Brooklyn

Records
Preceded by Brooklyn Point	Tallest building in Brooklyn; 2021–present	Current holder
