= Statues for Equality =

Public art organization

Statues for Equality is an initiative to improve the gender parity in public monuments worldwide. Creators Gillie and Marc noted that up to 2019, only five of New York City's 150 monuments commemorated nonfictional women.

The project's first public exhibit opened on August 26, 2019, to coincide with Women's Equality Day. The installation displayed ten bronze statues at 1285 Avenue of the Americas near Rockefeller Center, depicting Oprah Winfrey, Pink, Nicole Kidman, Jane Goodall, Cate Blanchett, Tererai Trent, Janet Mock, Tracy Dyson, Cheryl Strayed and Gabby Douglas Each woman is depicted standing in the center of a flower of their own choosing. The statues have since been removed, with eight moved to permanent locations elsewhere.

The project is also responsible for the Statue of Ruth Bader Ginsburg to be unveiled outside 445 Albee Square in Downtown Brooklyn's City Point in New York City on March 15, 2021.
