= City Point (Brooklyn) =

Mixed-use development in Brooklyn, New York

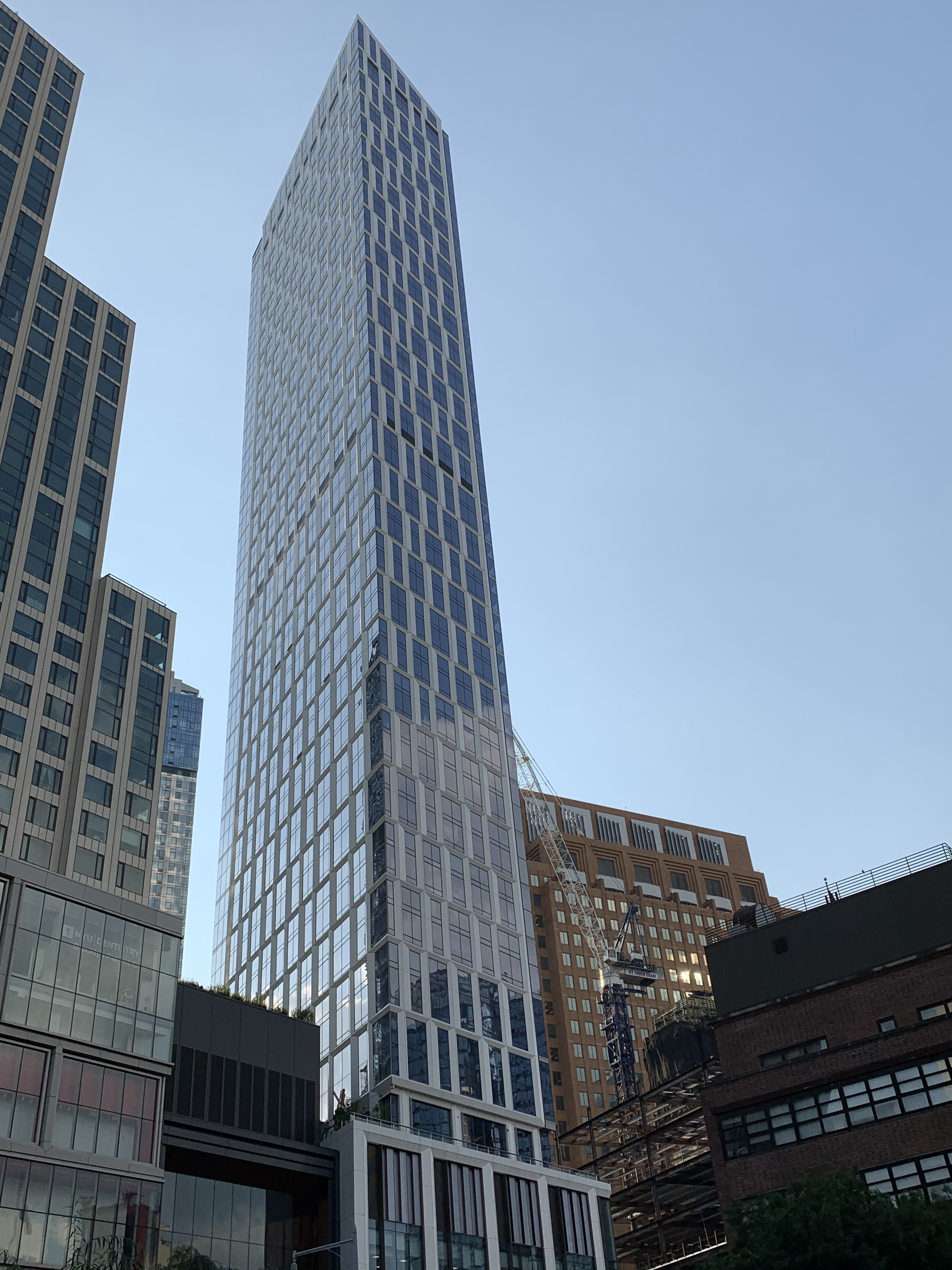
- Brooklyn Point, the tallest building in the City Point complex; prior to construction of The Brooklyn Tower.
- Interactive map of the City Point area
- Alternative names: 1 City Point; 10 City Point; City Tower; One DeKalb Avenue

General information
- Type: Mixed-use
- Location: 336 Flatbush Avenue Extension
- Coordinates: 40°41′25″N 73°58′56″W
- Completed: 2015 (City Point I); 2016 (City Point II); 2020 (City Point III)
- Management: The Brodsky Organization

Height
- Roof: 361 feet (110 m) (City Point I); 525 feet (160 m) (City Point II); 720 feet (220 m) (City Point III)

Technical details
- Floor count: 30
- Floor area: 1.6 to 1.9 million square feet (150,000 to 180,000 m^{2})

Design and construction
- Architect: Cook + Fox Architects
- Main contractor: Albee Development LLC

Website
- citypointbrooklyn.com

City Point is a mixed-use multi-building residential and commercial complex in Downtown Brooklyn, New York City. City Point is, by square footage, the largest mixed-use development in the city. City Point III, standing at 720 feet in height, is currently the second tallest building in Brooklyn (behind the Brooklyn Tower) as well as the fourth tallest on Long Island (behind the Brooklyn Tower, the Skyline Tower in Long Island City, Queens, and Sven in Long Island City).

City Point was supported by the New York City Economic Development Corporation as a sustainable mixed-use development for retail and housing. The project was developed by Albee Development LLC and designed by Cook + Fox architects, and is LEED-silver certified. It was expected to create at least 328 construction jobs and 108 permanent jobs.

The complex is built over an entrance to the DeKalb Avenue station on the New York City Subway's B, Q, and R trains. It is across the Flatbush Avenue Extension from Long Island University's Brooklyn campus, and across Fleet Street from the Brooklyn Tower. City Point is located on the former site of the Albee Square Mall, and its southern entrance is centered on the Fulton Street Mall.

== Description and history ==
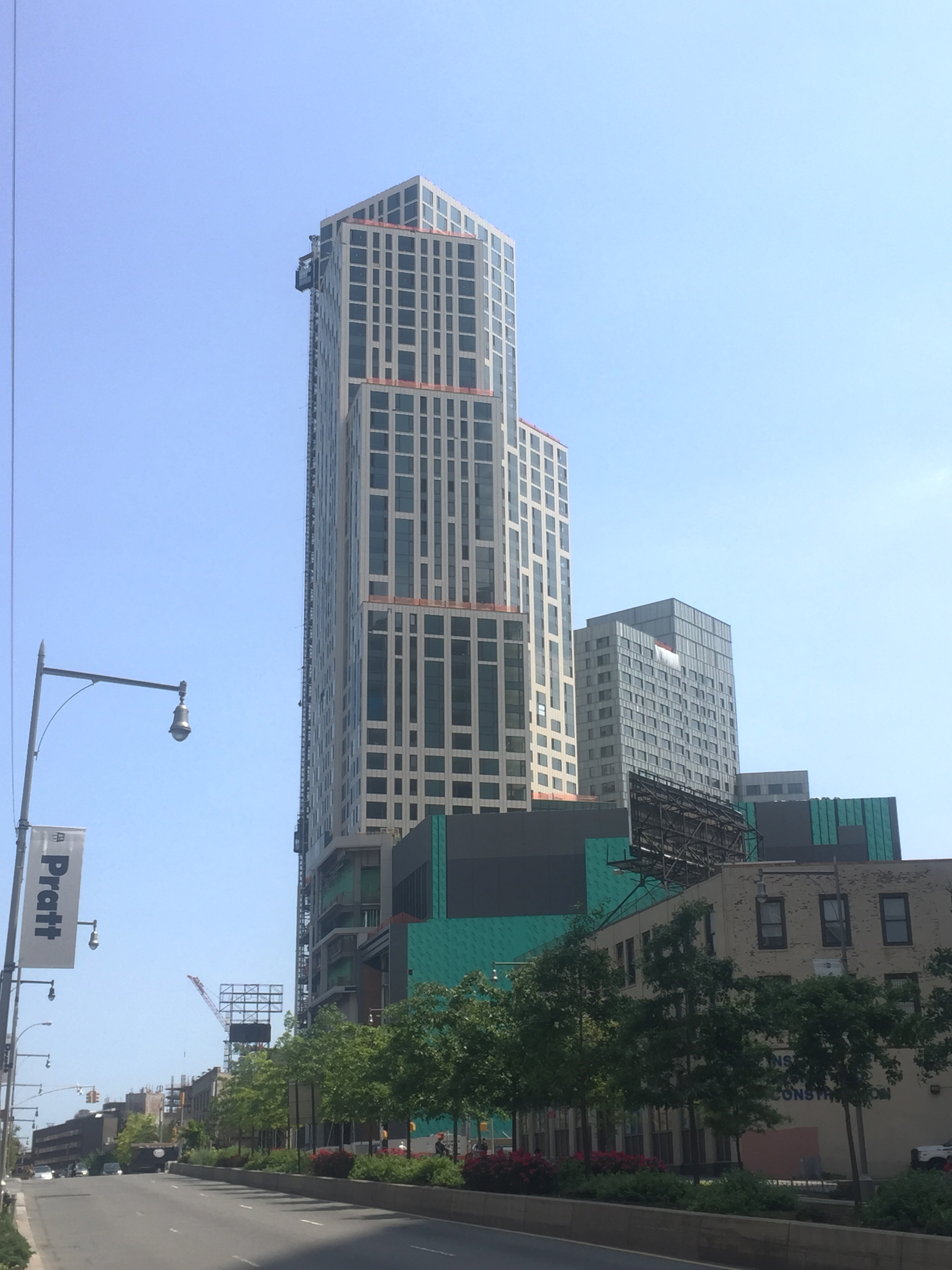
Looking southeast along Flatbush Avenue Extension in 2015 at City Point Tower II on the left and City Point Tower I on the right. The site of City Point Tower III, completed in 2020, is in the foreground.

In 2004, the New York City Economic Development Corporation adopted the "Downtown Brooklyn Plan", which consisted of a series of zoning changes and public works. City Point was one of the winning developments proposed, sitting on municipal-owned land, in an area already well-established as a shopping corridor.

The development was stalled in permitting but was helped through by then-Brooklyn Borough President Marty Markowitz, when the developers, Acadia Realty, made donations to a non-profit Markowitz operated. Markowitz and Acadia denied wrongdoing and cast the blame on the insistence of a partner firm, PA Associates, who were later indicted with bribing former New York State Senator Carl Kruger.

=== Towers ===
The first tower, City Point Tower I (also known as 7 DeKalb), opened in 2015. It is a 19-story, 225,000-square-foot tower with 200 units of affordable housing, and 50,000 square feet (4,600 m^{2}) of retail space.

The second tower, City Point Tower II (also known as 1 DeKalb Avenue), or 10 City Point, doing business as City Tower was completed in 2015 and opened in 2016. It is a 30-story, 335,000-square-foot tower with 440 market-rate units.

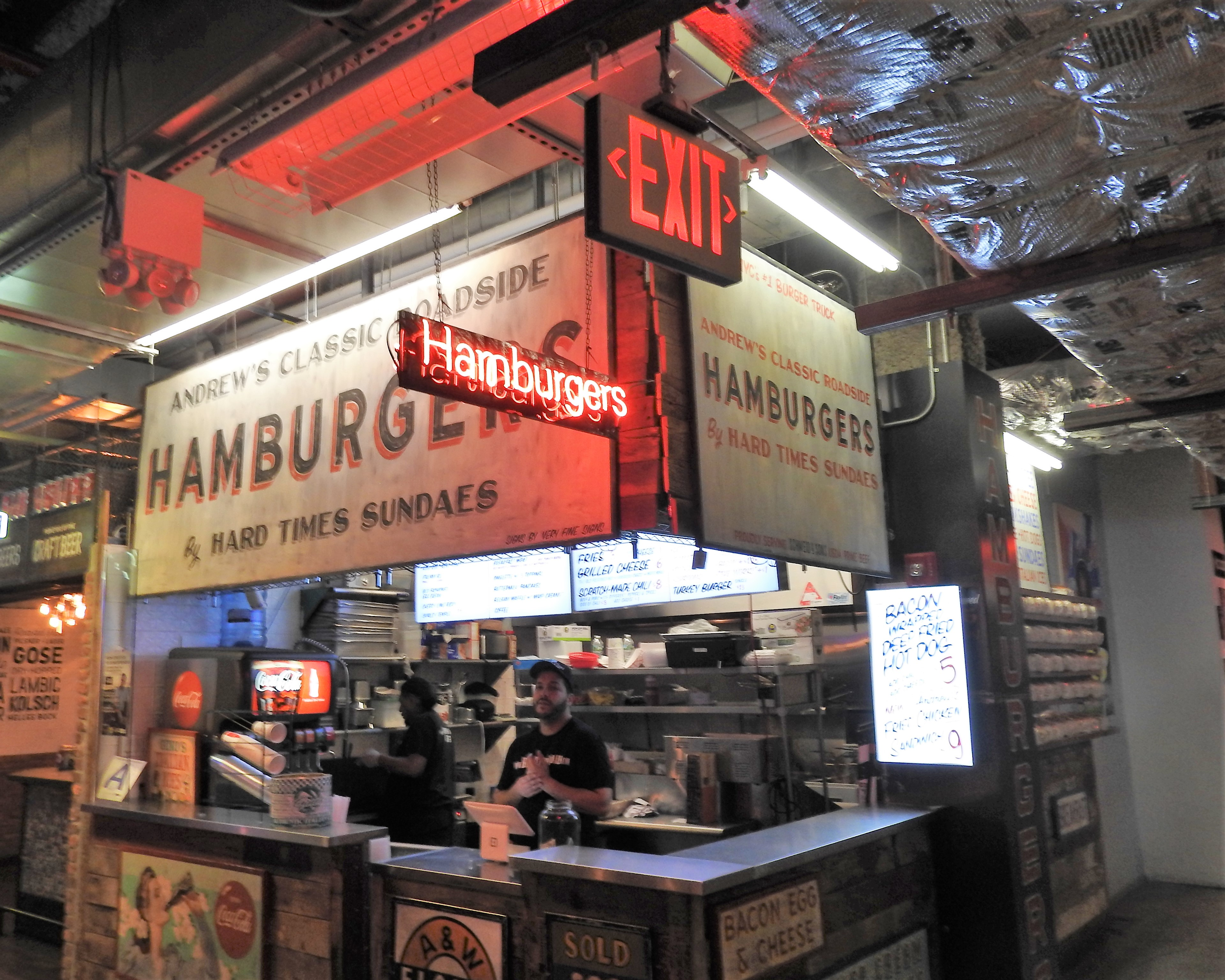
Burger stand in DeKalb Hall

A third tower—City Point Tower III, located at 138 Willoughby Street planned to be 720 feet (220 m) tall, making it the tallest in Brooklyn in 2020. 9 DeKalb Avenue (now The Brooklyn Tower) surpassed City Point Tower III in height in 2021. It was planned to contain 458 market-rate condo units taking up 1,082,218 square feet (100,541.3 m^{2}), with three stories of commercial space occupying 502,460 square feet (46,680 m^{2}). Tower III will be doing business as Brooklyn Point and was being designed by the firm Kohn Pedersen Fox. This would be the only for-sale residential development at City Point.

=== Shopping ===
Accessible by entrances on Flatbush Avenue Extension and on Fulton Street is a shopping plaza with big box national chain stores, smaller retail shops, a movie theater, bar, and grocery store, as well as restaurants and a 27,000 square foot food court in the basement of Tower II called DeKalb Market Hall. DeKalb Market Hall has 40 different vendors, small businesses based in the New York City area.

Between the first and second towers is "the podium", within which was built 660,000 square feet (61,000 m^{2}) of retail space, including a 4-floor Primark store. and an Alamo Drafthouse. On January 29, 2017, Target opened its store in City Point Tower II, with a Trader Joe's opening in June of the same year.

A Fogo de Chão restaurant opened on the ground level in April 2024.

=== Statue of Ruth Bader Ginsburg ===
The statue of Ruth Bader Ginsburg was installed outside 445 Albee Square in City Point on March 12, 2021. The statue consists of a 6 ft (1.8 m) bronze statue, set on a 1 ft (0.30 m) base, depicting Ruth Bader Ginsburg, the second woman to serve on the United States Supreme Court. The statue was moved in October 2022 and relocated to South Brooklyn Health's Ruth Bader Ginsburg Hospital, which opened on May 2, 2023.

== Notable tenants ==
- Alamo Drafthouse
- Fogo de Chão
- Primark
- Katz's Delicatessen
- Target
- Trader Joe's

== See also ==
- List of tallest buildings in Brooklyn

Records
Preceded by The Hub	Tallest building in Brooklyn; 2020–2021	Succeeded by Brooklyn Tower
