= One Willoughby Square =

Office building in Brooklyn, New York

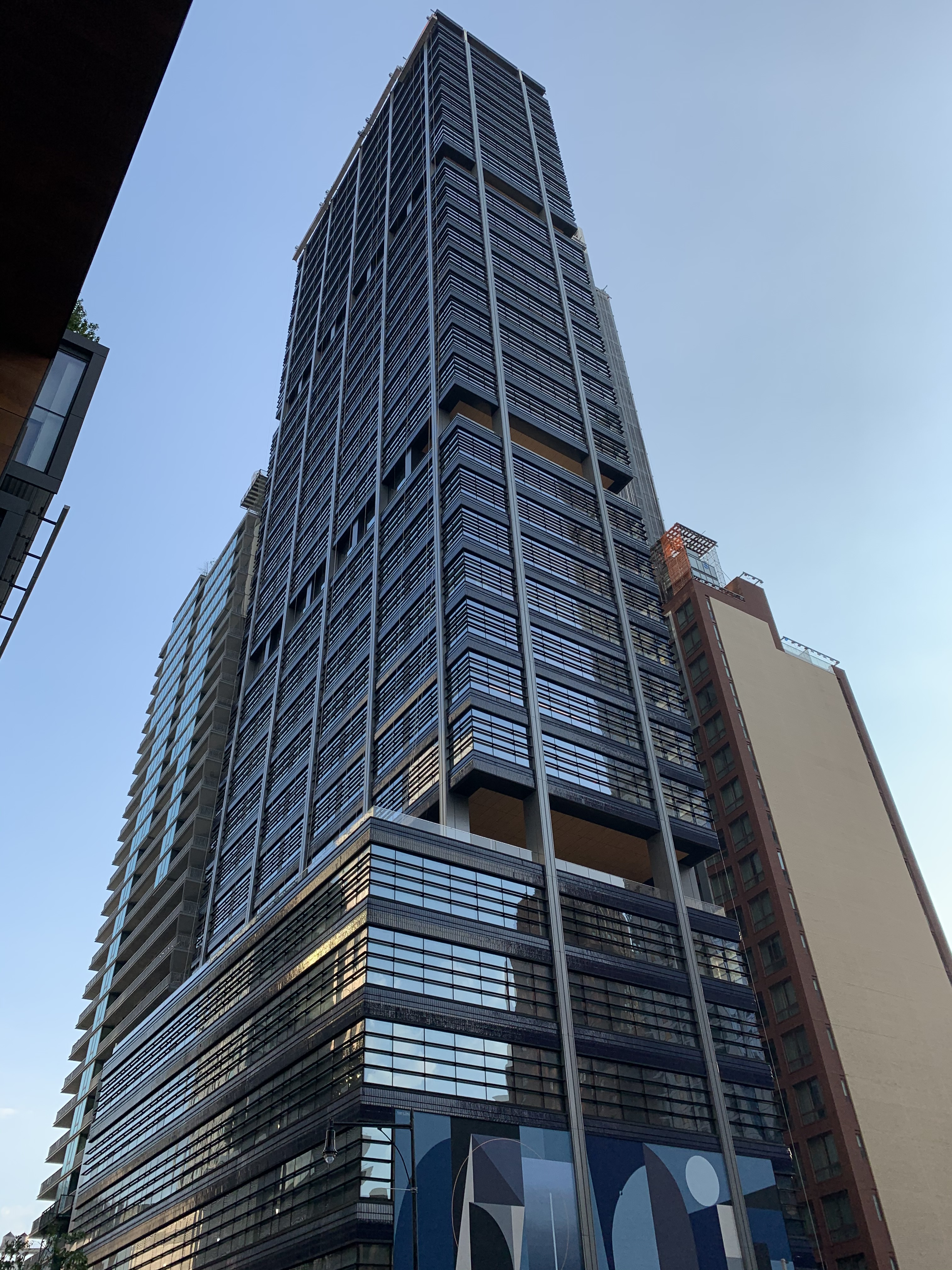
- Interactive map of the One Willoughby Square area

General information
- Status: Topped-out
- Type: Commercial office
- Location: 420 Albee Square West; Brooklyn, NY
- Coordinates: 40.691227°N 73.983589°W
- Estimated completion: 2021

Height
- Roof: 495 ft (151 m)

Technical details
- Floor count: 34
- Floor area: 500,000 square feet (46,000 m^{2})

Design and construction
- Architect: FXCollaborative
- Developer: JEMB Realty

One Willoughby Square (originally 420 Albee Square), styled as 1WSQ, is an office building in the New York City borough of Brooklyn. The building is being developed by JEMB Realty, and current plans have been drafted by FXCollaborative.

== History ==
The developer purchased the main site at 420 Albee Square for $38.5 million in 2014 and bought the rest of the development area from the New York City government for $18.3 million in 2017. The Girard family had owned it for years and operated the site as a parking lot. The developers also purchased 120,000 square feet (11,000 m^{2}) of development rights from the neighboring 217 Duffield Street, in exchange for financing a park on the site.

In September 2014, the developers filed plans for a 65-story, 679 feet (207 m) tall mixed-use tower named 420 Albee Square, designed by SLCE Architects. The planned tower would have been one of the tallest in Brooklyn and featured 751,548 square feet (69,821.1 m^{2}) of space with 271,203 square feet (25,195.6 m^{2}) devoted to office and the rest spread among 620 apartments. However, by November 2015 these plans had been scrapped in favor of a shorter 35-story tower featuring 500,000 square feet (46,000 m^{2}) of office space.

Kohn Pedersen Fox was brought on as design architect and their design featuring a glass and masonry facade was revealed in June 2017. However, FXFOWLE later replaced Kohn Pedersen Fox and redesigned the building entirely. One Willoughby Square will be the first major ground-up office project to rise since Downtown Brooklyn was rezoned in 2004 and will also become the tallest office tower in Brooklyn.

Permits for the office development were filed in September 2017. Construction at the site began in early 2018. The building topped out in October 2019. Otera Capital, a Canadian real estate lending company, provided a $235 million construction loan for the project in July 2018.

== Architecture and design ==
Because of an existing hotel and apartment tower built around the perimeter of the site, One Willoughby Square will have an irregular T-shaped floor plan. Current plans for the building include blue glazed bricks and a pleated pattern in two shades. The building features factory-style windows to maximize light. Additionally, the mechanicals, elevators and bathrooms of the building will be offset to the side of the tower (rather than its center) to reduce the amount of interior walls and maximize open floor space. Every other floor in the building will have an outdoor balcony. In addition, there are three “super floors” that will have 18-foot ceilings heights and terraces and loggias.

In front of the building, originally developers were planning to construct a 700-car underground parking garage, but this was cancelled.

== Usage ==
The second through sixth floors of the building will be used for a new school for the New York City School Construction Authority.
