= Krista Ninivaggi =

Krista Lyn Ninivaggi
- Born: June 24, 1979 (age 47); New Jersey
- Education: Rhode Island School of Design
- Years active: 2002-present
- Known for: Hospitality interiors, large-scale multifamily residential interiors
- Awards: Curbed Young Gun (2013) Contract Magazine Designer of the Year (2014)
- Website: http://k-and.co/

Krista Ninivaggi is a New York-based interior designer who primarily works in hospitality design. She is one of the few designers named by Contract Magazine as its Designer of the Year while still in her 30s. During her time at Rockwell Group and AvroKO, she focused on restaurant design, but has since expanded her portfolio to include art design and office spaces.

== Early life ==
Krista Ninivaggi grew up in New Jersey with her mother and father, Helene and John Ninivaggi. She has one younger sister. Ninivaggi began her design career at Rhode Island School of Design. She graduated with two bachelor's degrees, one in fine arts and another in architecture. During her years as a student she had several internships, including at the Guggenheim Museum and at Gwathmey Siegel & Associates Architects. After graduation, Ninivaggi moved to New York City.

== Career ==
New York is where Ninivaggi developed a sophisticated and cutting-edge approach to hospitality design. She mentioned she wanted to be able to "script the night" through her hospitality designs. After graduation, Ninivaggi moved to New York City where she began her career at Rockwell Group in the fall of 2002. After 3 years of working at Rockwell Group, she left the company in 2006 and worked with a design consultancy for a brief period, and then moved over to begin work for AvroKO. She credits her time at AvroKO to when she was able to see a number of high concept interiors work realized. Ninivaggi remained at AvroKO until 2010, and then began work at ShoP Architects in 2011. She said that she received the job at ShoP Architects through a softball league that also proved to be an ideal networking opportunity; she played on the field with people who later became her colleagues. During her time at ShoP, she was named director of interiors. Ninivaggi later left ShoP Architects to found her firm, K&Co, which specializes in hospitality and large-scale multi-family residential interiors.

== Materials and fabrication ==
During Ninivaggi's time at ShoP she began to work strongly with the relationship between materials and technology. She has spectacular skill in the technique of "direct to fabrication". She used technology such as laser cutter and 3D printers in order to make mockups of various lighting designs, etc. Ninivaggi's expertise in material innovation was also the basis for her contribution to flooring company Tarkett's "Collections Infinies". Ninivaggi is one of the "five creative stars" who were invited to develop designs to be digitally printed on Tarkett's luxury vinyl tile. Her design that was featured is called "Glow", and the designers were said to have been chosen for their "creative strength and vision".

== Projects ==
During the beginning of her career at Rockwell Group, Ninivaggi worked on several projects. One of these included the interiors of Nobu Fifty Seven, a sushi restaurant in New York City. As she moved onto work for AvroKO, she worked at the Lily & Bloom Restaurant in Hong Kong's LKF Tower. This project included multiple custom made design elements that she had to take into consideration. While at AvroKO, Ninivaggi also did design work for the Park Avenue Café. This café changes its interiors for each season, which means there are 4 scenarios that Ninivaggi had to design for in this project. During her time at ShoP, Ninivaggi amassed a lengthy portfolio of accomplishments. She is credited with building the ShoP interiors team "virtually from scratch...leading the design of the interiors of Barclays Center in Brooklyn, Shopbop headquarters in Manhattan, projects in Botswana and Washington, D.C., as well as the firm's own new office in the Woolworth Building". For the Barclays center, the spaces included the Vault Suites, individual suites, the 40/40 Club, and nearly every other main area. Ninivaggi's team also designed a prototype for an e-classroom that is to be used in the teachers college at Columbia University. At Ninivaggi's own company, K&Co, one of her most high-profile works was a rainbow pool at the residential complex Manhattan Park on Roosevelt Island. In 2015 she collaborated with Pliskin architecture, Citi Habitats New Developments, and artist HOT TEA on a design for what's known as the "pop up pool club" and is considered to be one of the many great public art installations in New York City. In 2016, artist Andrew Faris was the featured artist for the second consecutive year of the project.
