= Statue of Ruth Bader Ginsburg =

2021 statue in New York City, USA

- Artist: Gillie and Marc Shattner
- Medium: Bronze sculpture
- Subject: Ruth Bader Ginsburg
- Dimensions: 180 cm (6 ft)
- Location: Brooklyn, New York, U.S.; 40°35′10″N 73°57′55″W

The statue of Ruth Bader Ginsburg is a 7 ft (2.1 m) bronze statue of Ruth Bader Ginsburg, the second woman to serve on the United States Supreme Court. It was installed outside 445 Albee Square in Downtown Brooklyn's City Point in New York City on March 12, 2021. The statue was moved to South Brooklyn Health in October 2022 and is located inside the lobby of the facility's Ruth Bader Ginsburg Hospital, which opened on May 2, 2023.

== Background ==
The statue is a 7 ft (2.1 m) bronze sculpture depicting Ruth Bader Ginsburg, the second woman to serve on the United States Supreme Court, standing atop a stepped pedestal representing the Supreme Court and her climb to get to it. It was installed at 445 Albee Square, outside downtown Brooklyn's City Point, a mixed-use residential and commercial development. It was unveiled on March 12, 2021, to commemorate Women's History Month and Ginsburg's 88th birthday on March 15.

Ginsberg was born and grew up in Brooklyn. Brooklyn borough president Eric Adams has also declared March 15, 2021, "Justice Ginsburg Day".

The larger-than-life statue was created by the husband-and-wife artist team Gillie and Marc Shattner (who earlier made a bronze bust of her with her approval), as part of their Statues for Equality initiative. Through 2019, only five of New York City's 150 monuments commemorated real-life women. The artist team is known for their temporarily installed sculptures of animals, though in 2020 they installed ten statues of notable women in New York City.
