= Albee Square =

Square in Brooklyn, New York

Coordinates: 40.691°N 73.9854°W

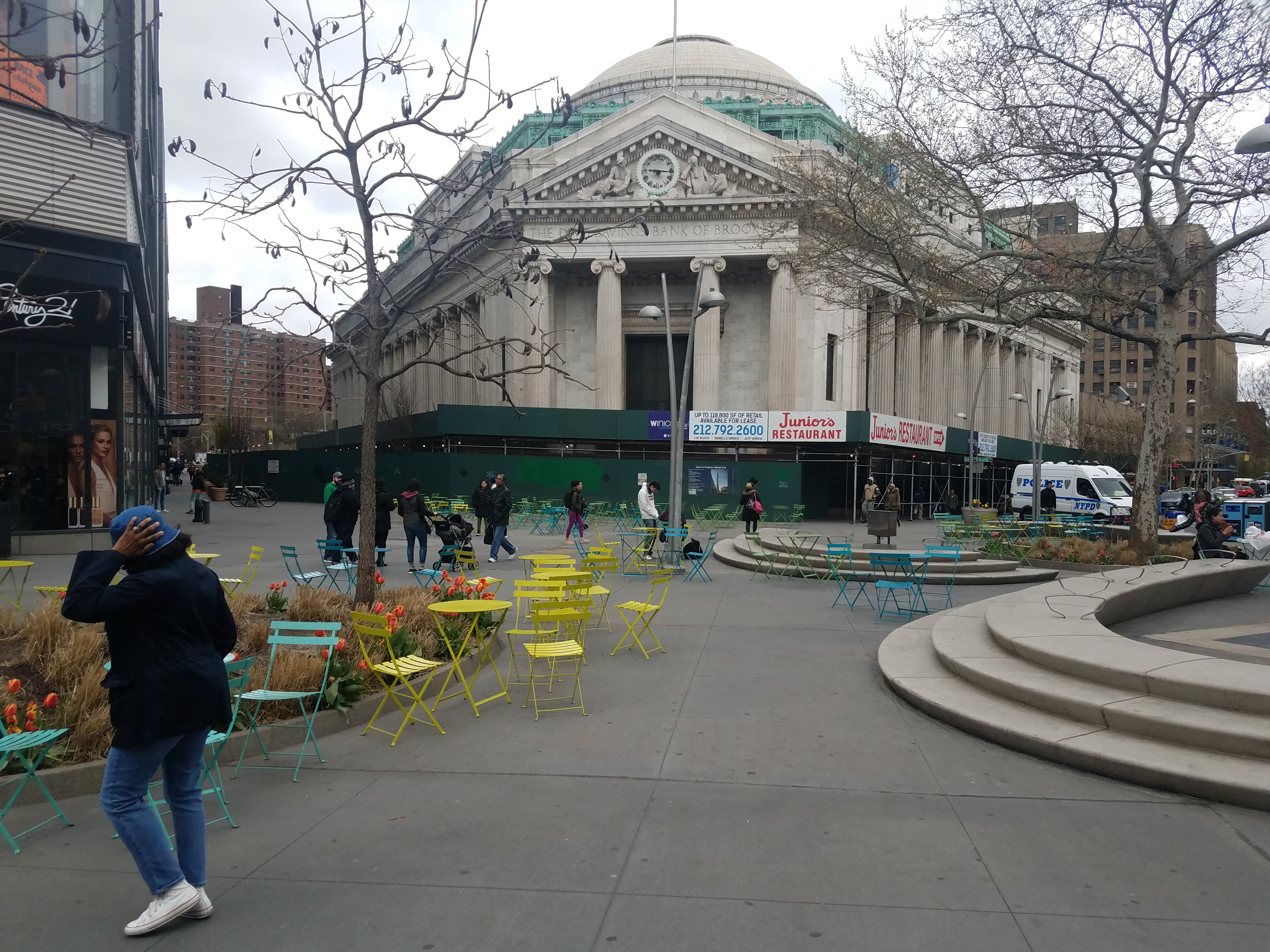
Albee Square facing the Dime Savings Bank Building, 2018

Albee Square is a public plaza in Downtown Brooklyn, New York City. The plaza is located at the intersection of Fulton Street, DeKalb Avenue, and Albee Square West. It is named after Edward Franklin Albee II who was the owner of several area theaters during the 1800s. Albee Square was a theater until 1977 when it was replaced by the Albee Square Mall, which was subsequently demolished for new development in 2004. The Dime Savings Bank Building, part of The Brooklyn Tower, is located on the northeast corner of Albee Square.

Albee Square West is also the name of a street that originates at Albee Square. It carries northbound traffic for one block from Fulton Street at its southern end to Willoughby Street at its northern end. At its northern end, Albee Square West becomes Gold Street, a one-way southbound street that continues north for two blocks to Myrtle Avenue. the mixed-use City Point development the proposed One Willoughby Square development are located on Albee Square West.

The Statue of Ruth Bader Ginsburg, a 6 ft (1.8 m) bronze statue, set on a 1 ft (0.30 m) base, of Ruth Bader Ginsburg, the second woman to serve on the United States Supreme Court, was unveiled outside 445 Albee Square on March 15, 2021.
