= List of food and drink podcasts =

This is a list of food and drink podcasts which are listed by release date of the first episode.

== List ==
Podcast	Year	Host(s)	Produced by	Ref
The Splendid Table	1997			
Food for Thought	2005			
Crash Test Kitchen	2005			
Art of the Drink	2006			
The Beerists Podcast	2012			
Bon Appétit Foodcast	2014			
Gastropod	2014			
Doughboys	2015			
The Racist Sandwich	2016			
The Four Top	2016			
Your Last Meal	2016			
Toasted Sister	2017			
Starving For Attention	2017			
Off Menu with Ed Gamble and James Acaster	2018			
Food 360	2019			
Food Court with Richard Blais	2020			
A Hot Dog Is A Sandwich	2020			
Maintenance Phase	2020			
The Restaurant Guys	2005			
Metal Mastication	2023			
