= The Four Top =

American culinary podcast

- Genre: Food; Beverage; Interview Podcast; Talk Podcast

Cast and voices
- Hosted by: Katherine Cole

Music
- Theme music composed by: Kielen King
- Opening theme: El Luchador Negro (Instrumental)

Production
- Production: Katherine Cole; Izzy Kramer; Kielen King

Publication
- No. of seasons: 3
- No. of episodes: 62
- Updates: Monthly (Monday)

Related
- Website: thefourtop.org

The Four Top is an American food and beverage podcast hosted by wine journalist Katherine Cole previously presented by Oregon Public Broadcasting. The podcast addresses current topics related to the food and drink industry in the United States and abroad. The Four Top debuted in September 2016 and airs weekly and seasonally. The last new episode of the podcast was released in February 2025.

== Format ==
The Four Top is a roundtable discussion of current issues related to food and beverage culture. Episodes are broken up into three "courses," or discussion topics. Three guest panelists join Cole for each episode. A "four top" is a restaurant-jargon term for a table for four diners.

== Guests ==
The Four Top's panelists rotate from episode to episode. Guests have included food-media personalities like Christopher Kimball, Steven Raichlen, Sprudge founder Jordan Michelman and Andrew Knowlton; authors like Bianca Bosker, Alice Feiring, Michael Ruhlman, Karen Karbo, and Alex Prud'homme; and others including Harold McGee, Dave Arnold, Curtis Ellis, and Gregory V. Jones.

== Awards ==
- James Beard Foundation Broadcast Media Award, 2017.
- IACP Digital Media Award for Culinary Audio Series, 2017.

== See also ==
- List of food podcasts
