= SHoP Architects =

Architecture firm

Practice information
- Firm type: Architectural design
- Partners: Christopher Sharples, Coren Sharples, Gregg Pasquarelli, Kimberly Holden, William Sharples
- Founded: 1996
- Location: Manhattan, New York City

Significant works and honors
- Buildings: Barclays Center, Steinway Tower, Brooklyn Tower, American Copper Buildings
- Awards: AIANY Honor Award, National Design Awards, National Design Award from the Smithsonian, AIANYS Best in State Award, AIANYS Award of Excellence, International Architecture Awards from the Chicago Athenaeum Museum of Architecture and Design

Website
- www.shoparc.com

SHoP Architects is an American architecture firm based in Lower Manhattan, New York City, with projects located on five continents. Led by four principals, the firm provides services to residences, commercial buildings, schools and cultural institutions, as well as large-scale master plans.

SHoP stands for Sharples Holden and Pasquarelli. Founded in 1996 by Gregg Pasquarelli, Christopher Sharples, Coren Sharples, Kimberly Holden, and William Sharples, the firm has approximately 180 employees. Its work has been exhibited internationally and included in the permanent collection of the Museum of Modern Art. Its first monograph, Out of Practice, was published in 2012 by the Monacelli Press.

== Work ==
The firm is known for its designs of the Barclays Center arena in Brooklyn, New York, its contract with the Howard Hughes Corporation to develop the new Pier 17 building at the South Street Seaport, and the design of 111 West 57th Street, also known as Steinway Tower. The Steinway Tower is one of several projects SHoP has designed in collaboration with JDS Development Group. Other buildings include the American Copper Buildings and 9 DeKalb Avenue, also known as the Brooklyn Tower.

It has also designed the Museum of Sex, a renovation of Governors Island, and the expansion of the Google headquarters in Silicon Valley, California.

SHoP is also known for its work on large-scale development projects. These include the Domino Sugar Factory redevelopment, Essex Crossing, and Schuylkill Yards.

== Awards and honors ==
In 2014, SHoP was named Fast Company magazine's "Most Innovative Architecture Firm in the World", and one of its "Most Innovative Companies in the World" for its policy of accepting equity in projects, rather than traditional payment, in exchange for services, as well as for its use of modular construction methods.

SHoP Architects' awards also include the 2009 National Design Award for Architecture Design from the Smithsonian Institution's Cooper Hewitt National Design Museum, the Chicago Athenaeum American Architecture Awards, and awards from the American Institute of Architects' New York City and New York State chapters.

== Criticism ==
Justin Davidson, the architecture critic for New York magazine, called the firm "ubiquitous" and criticized its plan with the Howard Hughes Corporation for the South Street Seaport, saying its single tower creates "a new barrier between the seaport and the world beyond." He writes that both the developer and the firm need to understand the area's "benign shabbiness" and not "set a new precedent [of] claiming the waterfront for residences."
