= Mt. Bagel =

Bagel shop in Seattle, Washington, U.S.

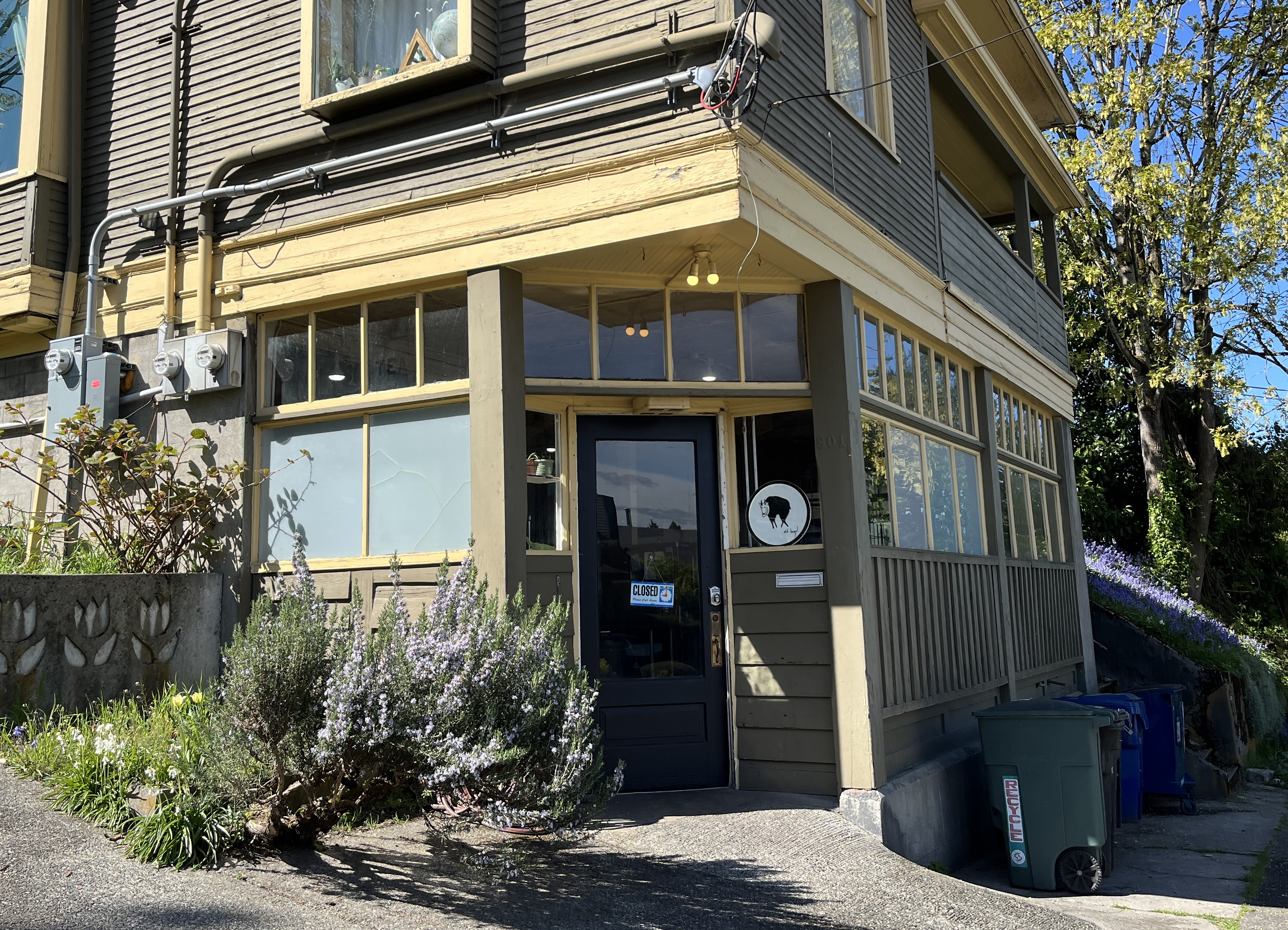
- The bagel shop's exterior in 2024
- Interactive map of Mt. Bagel

Restaurant information
- Established: 2019
- Owner: Roan Hartzog
- Location: 801 26th Avenue E, Seattle, King, Washington, 98112, United States
- Coordinates: 47.6260°N 122.2989°W
- Website: mtbagel.com

Mt. Bagel is a bagel shop in Seattle's Madison Valley neighborhood, in the U.S. state of Washington. Established by Roan Hartzog in 2019, the business initially operated via delivery before moving into a brick-and-mortar stop in Ballard in 2020. In 2023, Mt. Bagel relocated to Madison Valley.

== Description ==
The bagel shop Mt. Bagel operates on 26th Avenue East at the intersection of East Valley Street, in Seattle's Madison Valley neighborhood. The business made approximately 600 to 700 bagels per day, as of mid 2023, and offers six varieties and three schmears.

== History ==
The bakery Mt. Bagel was established in 2019, initially operating via delivery in Seattle. In August 2020, the business announced plans to move into a 200-square-foot brick-and-mortar space in the Ballard neighborhood.

In 2022, owner Roan Hartzog announced a move to Bend, Oregon. May 20 was the final day of operation. Then, in January 2023, Hartzog reversed course and announced plans to move into a brick-and-mortar restaurant in a Madison Valley space that had previously hosted Mt. Bagel as a pop-up.

Hartzog and the business were featured on an episode of Rachel Belle's podcast Your Last Meal.

== Reception ==
According to KUOW-FM, Mt. Bagel was a "cult favorite" during the COVID-19 pandemic. In 2020, Adam H. Callaghan of Seattle Metropolitan called the business "the Hamilton ticket of bagels". Writers for Eater Seattle included Mt. Bagel in a 2023 list of ten "sensational" bagel shops in the metropolitan area.

The business ranked first in The Infatuation's 2023 "definitive ranking of the best bagels" in the city. The website's Kayla Sager-Riley and Aimee Rizzo wrote, "Who knew that we would live in a world where in exactly 60 seconds, a batch of bagels could sell out like a highly anticipated sneaker release? These bagels are not only Seattle's finest, but they have ruined basically all others." The duo opined, "A spoonful of the spicy scallion cream cheese is phenomenal on its own, but when smeared on a coveted everything bagel that has a crackly outside and soft, malty inside, all becomes well—flowers begin to bloom, the sun shines, and butterflies start landing on you like in a Disney movie. If you can get your hands on some fresh Mt. Bagel beauties from their Madison Valley kitchen, freeze a few to trade as currency for when the apocalypse comes. They'll probably be worth more than the newest Air Jordans." ParentMap said in 2024, "If Yelp reviews are to be trusted, and in this case, they are, then Mt. Bagel tops this list. For New York-style bagel purists, it's a winner."

== See also ==
- List of bakeries
