= 111 West 57th Street =

Skyscraper in Manhattan, New York

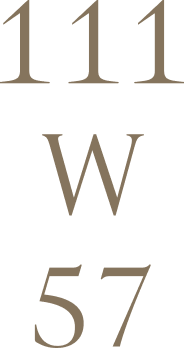

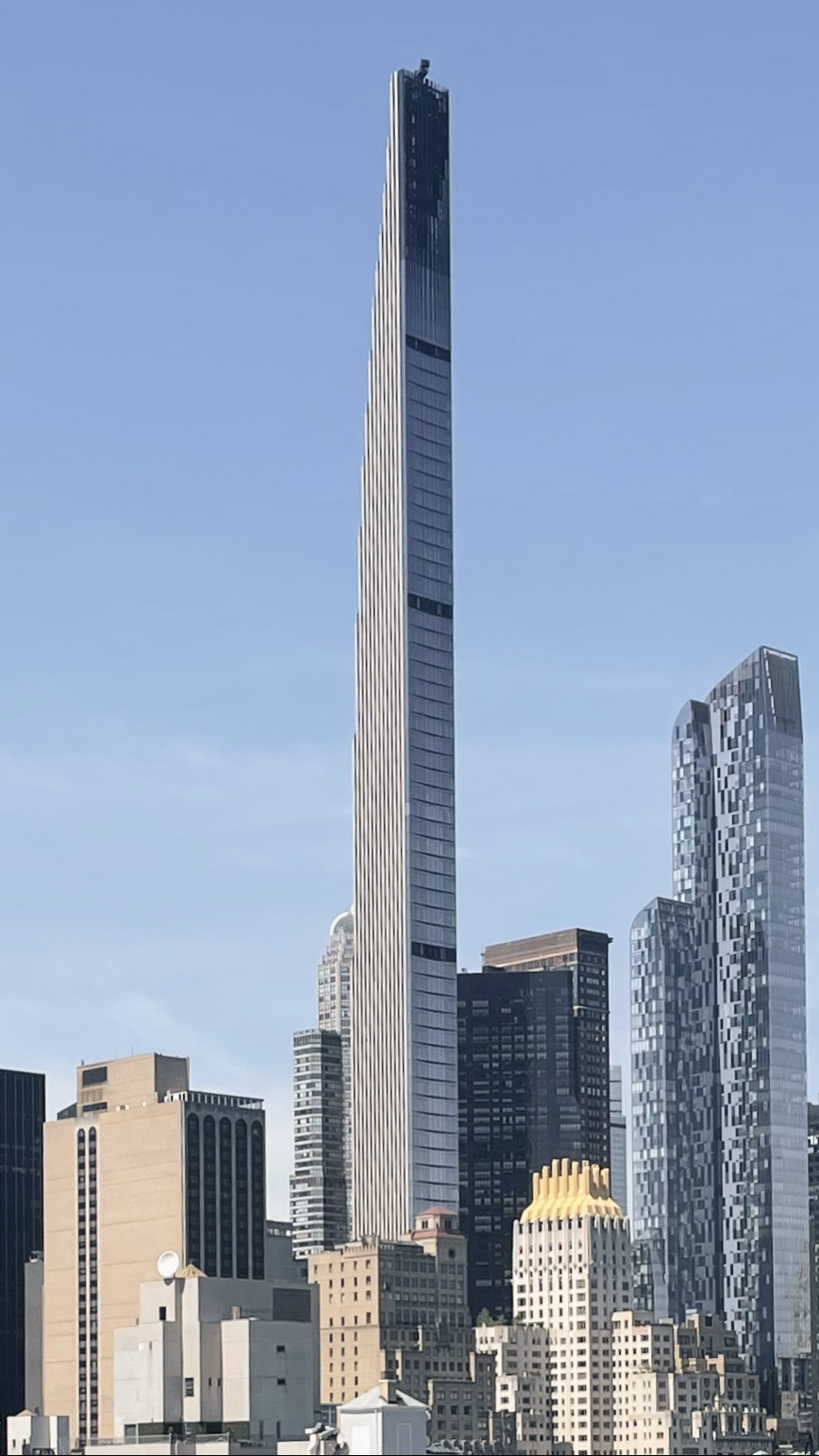
- 111 West 57th Street in May 2022
- Alternative names: Steinway Tower

General information
- Status: Completed
- Type: Residential
- Architectural style: Neo-Art Deco (residential tower); Neoclassical (Steinway Hall)
- Location: Manhattan, New York, United States
- Coordinates: 40°45′54″N 73°58′39″W
- Construction started: July 8, 2015 (residential tower); June 1924 (Steinway Hall)
- Topped-out: October 2019 (residential tower)
- Completed: 2022 (residential tower); October 27, 1925 (Steinway Hall)
- Renovated: 2019–2021 (Steinway Hall)
- Cost: $2 billion

Height
- Architectural: 1,428 ft (435 m)
- Tip: 1,428 ft (435 m)
- Top floor: 91 (Note: SHoP Architects classifies the true number of stories above ground as "construction levels", which are labeled with a different "marketing floor" number. The numbering is as follows: 5th through 7th stories above ground – respectively labeled as floors 8–10; 8th story – not given a number; 9th and 10th stories – labeled as floors 11–12; 11th through 17th stories – labeled as floors 13–20; 19th through 85th stories – labeled as floors 25–91)

Technical details
- Structural system: Concrete frame
- Floor count: 84
- Floor area: 572,348 ft^{2} (53,172.9 m^{2})
- Lifts/elevators: 14

Design and construction
- Architects: SHoP Architects (Steinway Hall conversion and residential tower); Warren and Wetmore (Steinway Hall)
- Developer: JDS Development Group and Property Markets Group
- Engineer: Jaros, Baum & Bolles (MEP)
- Structural engineer: WSP

Other information
- Number of units: 59
- Public transit: Subway: at 57th Street

Website
- 111w57.com

New York City Landmark
- Designated: November 13, 2001
- Reference no.: 2100
- Designated entity: Steinway Hall facade

New York City Landmark
- Designated: September 10, 2013
- Reference no.: 2551
- Designated entity: Steinway Hall rotunda

111 West 57th Street, also known as Steinway Tower, is a supertall residential skyscraper in the Midtown Manhattan neighborhood of New York City, New York, U.S. Developed by JDS Development Group and Property Markets Group, it sits on Billionaires' Row on the north side of 57th Street near Sixth Avenue. The main portion of the building is an 84-story, 1,428-foot (435-meter) tower designed by SHoP Architects and completed in 2021. Preserved at the base is the 16-story Steinway Building (also Steinway Hall), a former Steinway & Sons store designed by Warren and Wetmore and completed in 1925, which originally carried the address 111 West 57th Street. The residential tower is designed in a neo-Art Deco style, while Steinway Hall is designed in a neoclassical style.

111 West 57th Street contains 59 luxury condominiums: 14 in Steinway Hall and 45 in the tower. The residential tower has a glass facade with piers made of terracotta; its pinnacle contains setbacks on the southern side. The tower is the fourth-tallest building in the United States, as well as the thinnest skyscraper in the world with a width-to-height ratio of about 1:24. Steinway Hall is a New York City designated landmark and has a facade made mostly of brick, limestone, and terracotta. 111 West 57th Street contains numerous resident amenities, housed mostly in the building's base, as well as a large rotunda within Steinway Hall that is also a designated city landmark.

The Steinway & Sons store at 111 West 57th Street was proposed in 1916 but was not completed for another nine years due to lawsuits and other delays. Steinway Hall served as a store, recital hall, and office building for almost nine decades, though it was unsuccessful as a speculative development. Plans for a residential skyscraper on the site date to 2005, and JDS acquired the lots for the skyscraper between 2012 and 2013. The tower was constructed as an addition to Steinway Hall, which was restored as part of the project. Construction on the tower began in 2014, though the development faced several challenges, including financing difficulties, lawsuits, and controversies over employment. The tower topped out during April 2019 and was finished in 2022.

== Site ==
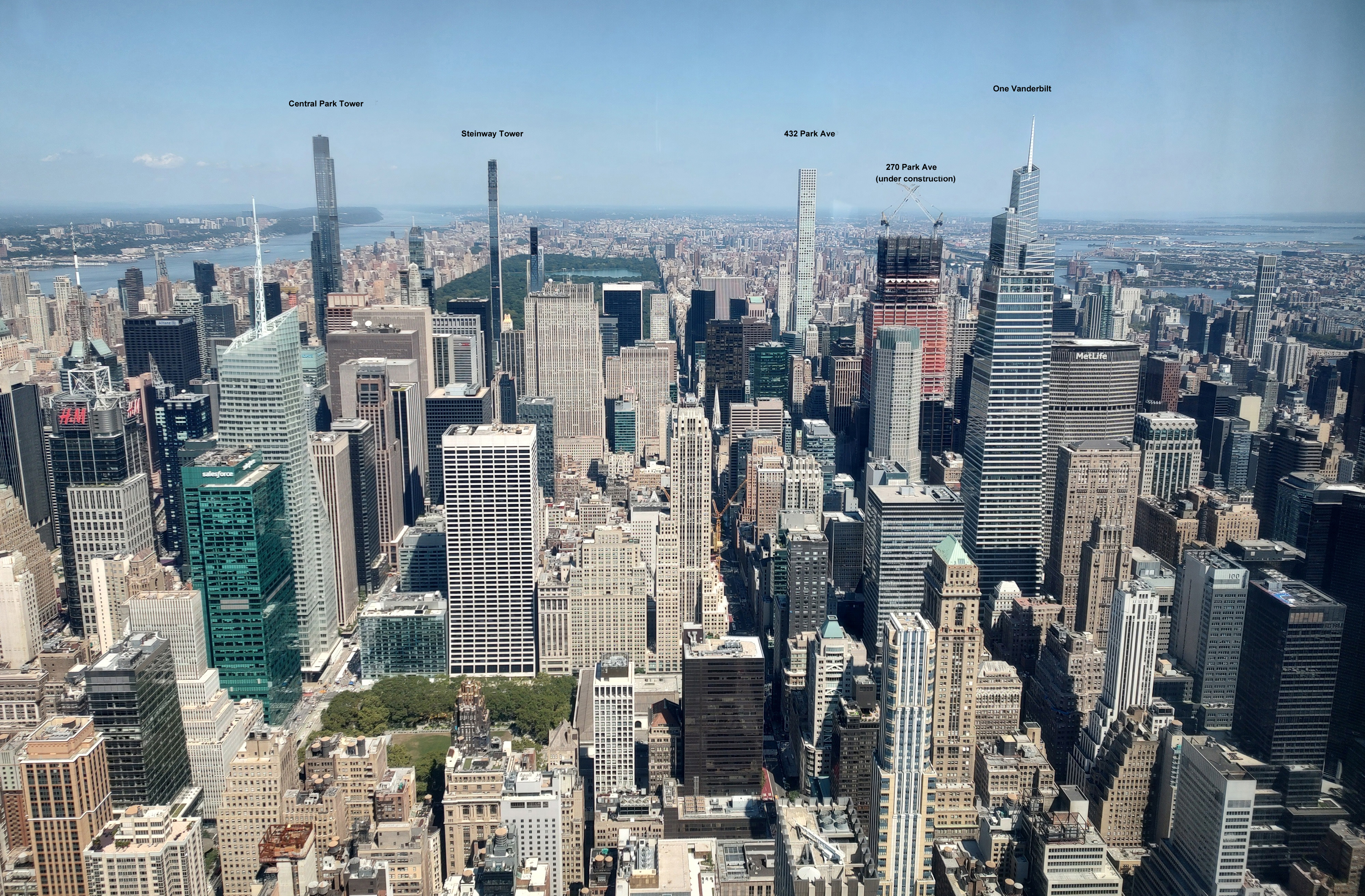
Midtown Manhattan in September 2023, looking north from the Empire State Building's 102nd floor (1,224 feet or 373 meters). 111 West 57th Street is labeled as "Steinway Tower".

111 West 57th Street is in the Midtown Manhattan neighborhood of New York City, New York, U.S. It is located one city block south of Central Park, between Sixth Avenue to the east and Seventh Avenue to the west. The building occupies the land lots at 105–113 West 57th Street and contains frontage along 57th Street to the south and 58th Street to the north. The rectangular site covers 20,621 square feet (1,915.8 m^{2}), with a frontage of 106 feet (32 m) on 57th and 58th Streets, and a depth of 200.83 feet (61.21 m) between the two streets.

111 West 57th Street occupies the same block as the Calvary Baptist Church, One57, and Alwyn Court to the west, and abuts The Quin immediately to the east. 111 West 57th Street is also near Carnegie Hall, Carnegie Hall Tower, and Metropolitan Tower one block west; Parker New York, 130 West 57th Street, and 140 West 57th Street across 57th Street to the south; and Hampshire House and Trump Parc across 58th Street to the north. The building stands across from the 57th Street station of the New York City Subway's F and M trains. 111 West 57th Street is one of several major developments around 57th Street and Central Park that are collectively dubbed Billionaires' Row by the media. Other buildings along Billionaires' Row include 432 Park Avenue four blocks southeast, 220 Central Park South one block northwest, Central Park Tower one block west, and the nearby One57.

111 West 57th Street's base contains Steinway Hall, a former store and recital hall completed in 1925 for Steinway & Sons. Steinway Hall was designed by Warren & Wetmore and is a New York City designated landmark. Steinway Hall was part of an artistic hub developed around the two blocks of West 57th Street from Sixth Avenue west to Broadway during the late 19th and early 20th centuries, following the opening of Carnegie Hall in 1891. The area contains several buildings constructed as residences for artists and musicians, such as 130 and 140 West 57th Street, the Rodin Studios, and the Osborne Apartments. In addition, the area contained the headquarters of organizations such as the American Fine Arts Society, the Lotos Club, and the American Society of Civil Engineers.

== Architecture ==
111 West 57th Street, also known as Steinway Tower, was developed by Michael Stern's JDS Development Group and Kevin P. Maloney's Property Markets Group (PMG). WSP USA was the structural engineer for the project, while Jaros, Baum & Bolles was the engineer in charge of mechanical, electrical, and plumbing.

The building has two components. The base of the development contains Warren and Wetmore's Steinway Hall, above which is a 1,428-foot-tall (435 m) tower designed by SHoP Architects. According to documents filed by SHoP Architects principal Gregg Pasquarelli, the roof slab of the tower is 1,257 feet 6 inches (383.29 m) above ground level while the pinnacle is 1,423 feet 7 inches (433.91 m) above ground. The building contains 84 stories above ground level or 85 including the roof slab. The top story is numbered as floor 91, while floor numbers 5–7, 13, and 21–25 are skipped. The tallest habitable story of the tower is 1,134 feet (346 m) above ground level. There is also a sub-cellar and cellar, used primarily for utilities and storage.

=== Form ===
The 16-story, L-shaped Steinway Hall has frontages of 63 feet (19 m) along 57th Street and 100 feet (30 m) on 58th Street. The concert hall has a setback above the 12th story on 57th Street, and setbacks above the 9th and 12th stories on 58th Street. The 16th story along 57th Street (marketed as floor 19) is also set back from all sides. The roof of Steinway Hall contains a campanile with a pyramidal copper roof and lantern, similar to the Mausoleum at Halicarnassus. Christopher Gray of The New York Times described the campanile as having a "sculptural, even funerary, caste".

The residential tower atop Steinway Hall occupies a site measuring about 59 by 75 feet (18 by 23 m) across. (Note: One source gives a more precise width of 58.75 feet (17.91 m), while another source cites a different width of 58 feet (18 m).) It is one of the tallest buildings in the United States, as well as the thinnest skyscraper in the world with a width-to-height ratio of about 1:24. Due to its slenderness, the top stories sway several feet during high winds. The building has been characterized as part of a new breed of New York City "pencil towers". The tower's northern elevation rises directly up to the pinnacle, and the southern elevation contains several setbacks as the tower rises, thinning the tower's footprint on higher floors. (Note: These setbacks are located at floors 51, 64, 71, 76, 80, 83, 86, and 89.) The pinnacle's lighting pattern was commissioned by L'Observatoire International. Because of the shape of the tower's pinnacle, 111 West 57th Street has been nicknamed the "stairway to heaven".

=== Facade ===
==== Steinway Hall ====
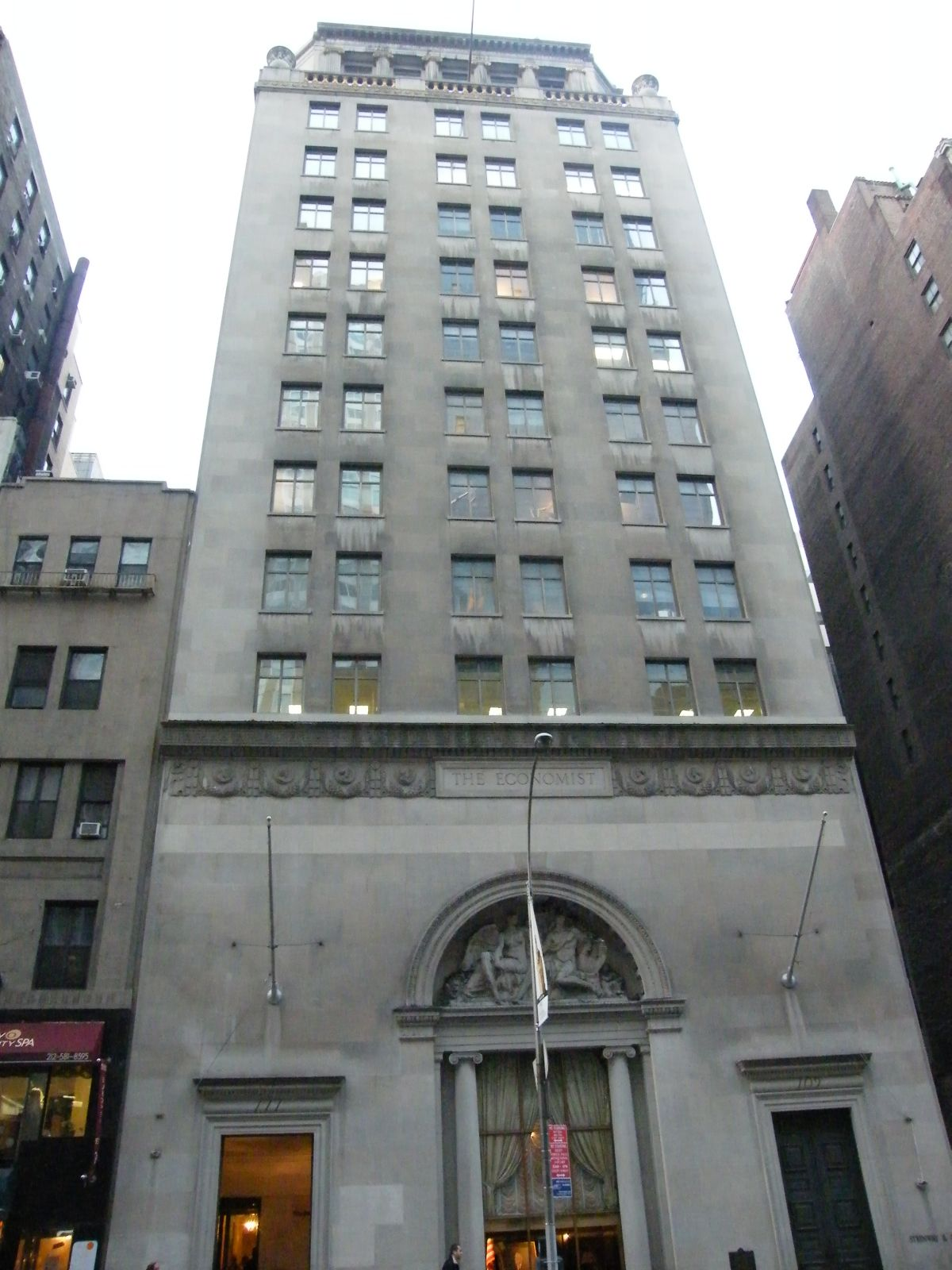
The 57th Street side of Steinway Hall before the construction of the residential tower

Steinway Hall's exterior is neoclassical in style. On the first three stories of Steinway Hall's southern elevation, facing 57th Street, the facade is made of Indiana limestone above a pink-granite water table. Two rectangular portals flank a large central arch there. The outer portals contain wooden pocket doors, which are surrounded by moldings and topped with entablatures. The central opening is a display window that contains an entablature supported by Ionic columns on either side, as well as a lunette above the entablature. The lunette has a cement sculptural group by Leo Lentelli, which contains a bas-relief of Apollo. Above the third story is a frieze that has medallions depicting classical composers and pianists, in addition to a plaque.

The northern elevation on 58th Street is clad with brick, limestone, and terracotta. The lowest two floors are faced with rusticated limestone blocks; the first floor has loading docks on either end of the 58th Street elevation. One of the 58th Street loading docks led to a freight elevator for Steinway Hall's tenants, while the other led to a freight elevator used specifically by Steinway & Sons.

Steinway Hall's upper stories are clad with brick. On 57th Street, there are three pairs of windows on each of the 4th through 12th stories. On 58th Street, there are five windows on each of the 3rd through 12th stories; there is a balustrade at the third story and a cornice atop the 9th story. Above the 12th story, on both 57th and 58th Streets, is a parapet capped by urns. The western elevation is clad with plain brick and contains some window openings. The 13th through 15th stories of Steinway Hall have chamfered corners and Ionic colonnades, with a parapet above the 15th story. The 16th story has brick piers at each corner, shallow arches on each side, band courses at the bottom, and a cornice at the top.

==== Tower ====
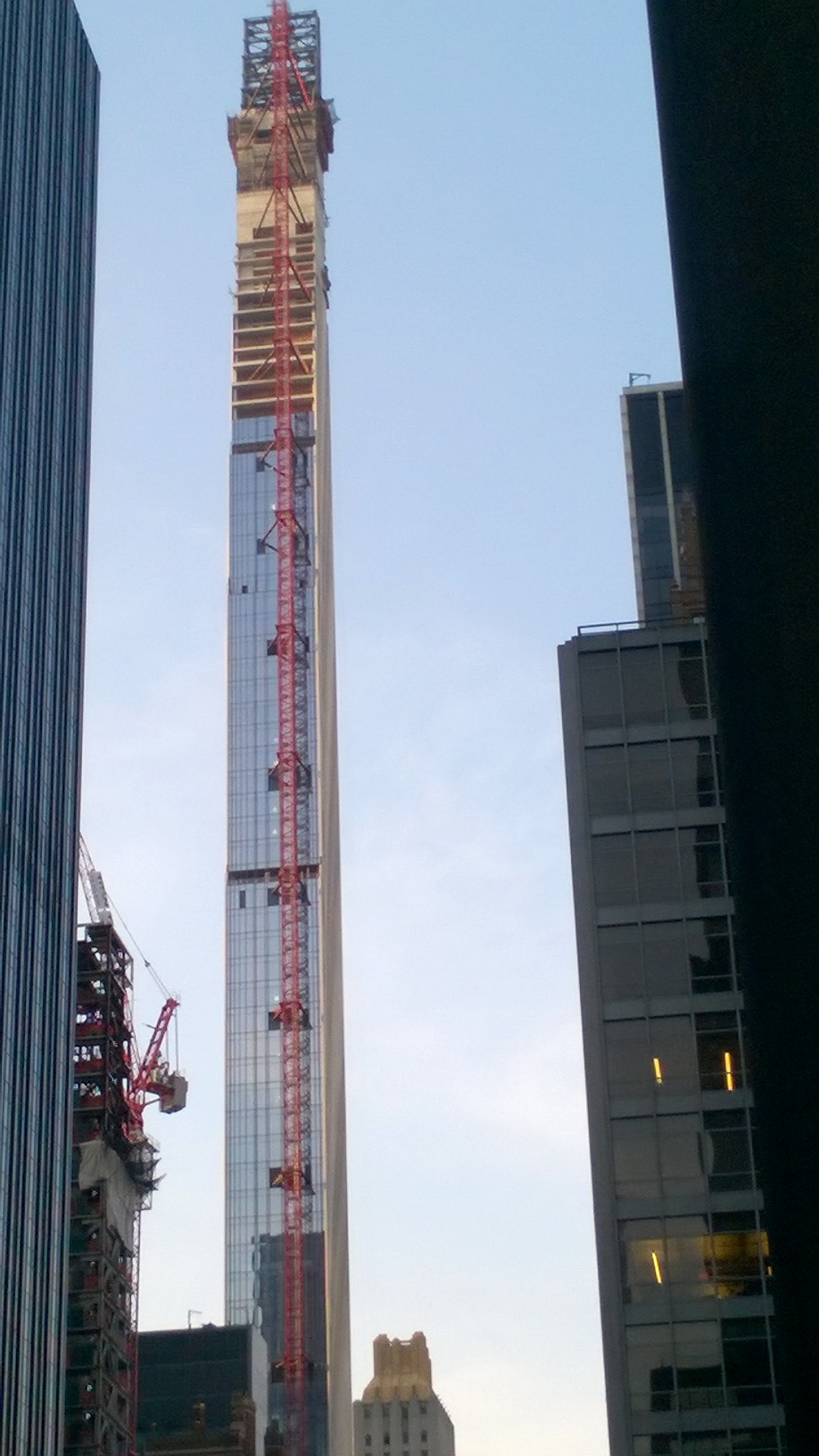
The slender southern elevation with pinnacle installation, as seen from Sixth Avenue in July 2019

The tower section is designed in a neo-Art Deco style. The tower's facade was designed by BuroHappold and was inspired by older New York City skyscrapers including the Empire State, Chrysler, and RCA buildings. Within the portion of the ground level not occupied by Steinway Hall, there are doors with aluminum or bronze frames. This section serves as the retail entrance and was included only because zoning rules mandated it. The northern and southern elevations consist of large glass curtain walls. There are bronze mullions between the windows, which project slightly from the glass curtain wall. The top section of the northern elevation, above the highest habitable story, contains reflective glass panels in front of the pinnacle's reinforced concrete walls. There are glass parapets above each setback, and the roof terraces also contain guard rails made of aluminum, bronze, or steel.

The eastern and western elevations contain narrow windows between vertical piers of glazed terracotta, which are made of extruded and glazed blocks arranged in a wave-like pattern. Six tones of white were used for the terracotta, which was manufactured in Germany and poured into one of 26 molds. The terracotta piers are meant to be reminiscent of older terracotta designs in New York City, and the beige color complements the limestone facade of Steinway Hall. Each of the terracotta piers rises to the height of one of the setbacks on the pinnacle. There are also bronze mullions, which contain curving patterns resembling bird feathers, between the piers. The piers and mullions help stabilize the tower by creating wind turbulence.

=== Structural features ===
==== Steel and concrete frame ====
The existing Steinway Hall contains a structural steel frame atop a foundation with reinforced concrete and steel grillages. The rock under the building can support a load of 60 short tons per square foot (590 t/m^{2}), and the building's footings measure between 6 and 13 feet (1.8 and 4.0 m) thick. The foundations of the tower contain nearly 200 steel rods, which descend as much as 100 feet (30 m) into the underlying bedrock. These deep foundations are necessitated by the tower's extreme slenderness. The building has two cellar levels. Steinway Hall originally had a cellar vault extending under the roadway at 57th Street, which was partially infilled and modified as part of the tower's construction.

The superstructure of the tower is made mostly of concrete, the strength of which ranges between 6,000 and 14,000 pounds per square inch (41,000 and 97,000 kPa). The structural design was influenced by Stern's requirement that there be no columns obstructing residents' views from their apartments, as well as the small dimensions of the tower's floors. The core structural system is formed by two large shear walls installed behind the eastern and western facades, maximizing usable floor area. The two shear walls range in thickness from 30–36 inches (760–910 mm) on the lower stories to 16 inches (410 mm) on the upper stories. On the upper floors, the shear walls are recessed to accommodate corner windows.

The tower's floor plates are high-strength concrete slabs with a compressive strength of 14,000 pounds per square inch (97,000 kPa). They are reinforced with 5,500,000 square feet (510,000 m^{2}) of rebar and welded plates. The floors are supported by additional beams at three-story intervals. At the southern end of each floor are 6-foot-wide (1.8 m) beams, as there is no space for standalone columns at the south end of the building. There are two columns at the northern end of each floor; aside from these, the floor slabs are not interrupted by any other columns. On the mechanical floors, four outrigger walls link the columns with the mechanical core. Interior walls above the floor slabs also connect the shear walls. Three of the floors are unenclosed, allowing wind gusts to pass through the building, and thereby reducing vibrations caused by vortex shedding.

==== Crown ====
The building is topped by a "crown" measuring about 160 feet (49 m) or 170 feet (52 m) tall, which was inspired by the crown of the Chrysler Building. The crown rests on a deck made of metal composite and is reinforced by steel beams; it houses some of the building's mechanical equipment. The top of the tower includes an 800-short-ton (710-long-ton; 730 t) tuned mass damper to provide stability against high winds or earthquakes. The damper consists of a pair of weights with tuned steel plates.

=== Interior ===
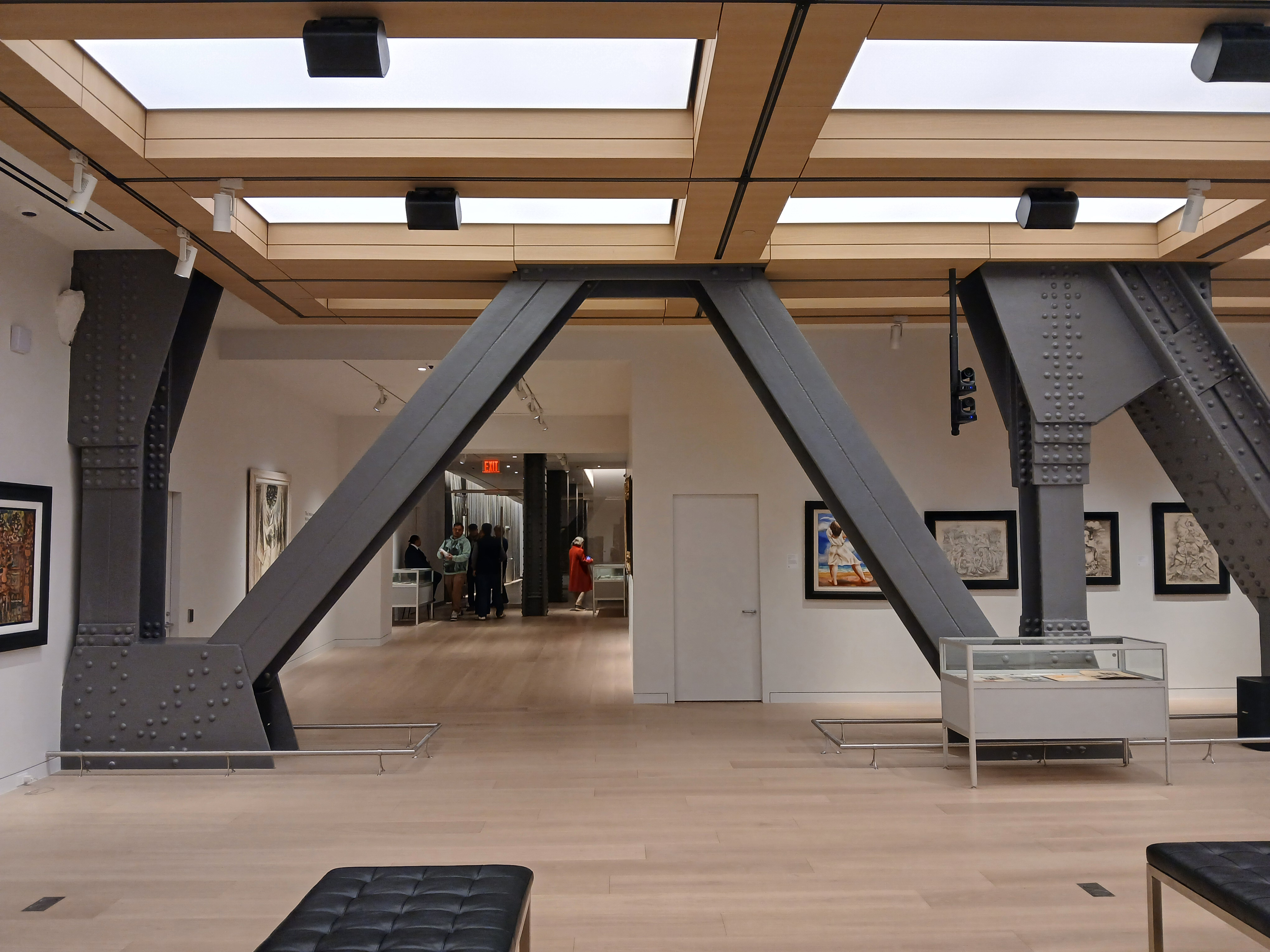
Interior of Bonhams space

Studio Sofield designed the new spaces and redesigned the existing spaces at 111 West 57th Street; the interior of the original Steinway Hall had originally been designed by Walter L. Hopkins. There are 59 apartments in total. Originally, the building had 60 units, with 46 in the tower and 14 in Steinway Hall; the tower's top two units have been combined for a total of 45 tower apartments. According to the New York City Department of City Planning, the building has a gross floor area of 303,225 square feet (28,170.5 m^{2}).

The building has 20,000 square feet (1,900 m^{2}) of amenity space across several floors. Spanning the cellar and floors 1, 3, and 4 is a "non-residential unit", which contains 54,158 square feet (5,031.4 m^{2}) of commercial space. Several stories in the tower and base contain mechanical equipment, (Note: These are floors 2, 9, 21, 40–41, and 62–63, as well as the space on and above floor 84.) while floors 51, 71, and 86 are unenclosed. 111 West 57th Street contains fourteen elevators: five in Steinway Hall and nine in the tower. Seven of the tower elevators are within individual suites, while the remaining seven elevators are shared by all residents. Steinway Hall had initially contained six elevators, one of which was upgraded as part of the residential project. Decorations, such as bas-reliefs of tourist landmarks such as St. Patrick's Cathedral and the Whitney Museum, are scattered throughout the building. There is also a four-story, 42,000-square-foot (3,900 m^{2}) commercial space, which is used by auction house Bonhams as of 2026.

==== Ground floor ====
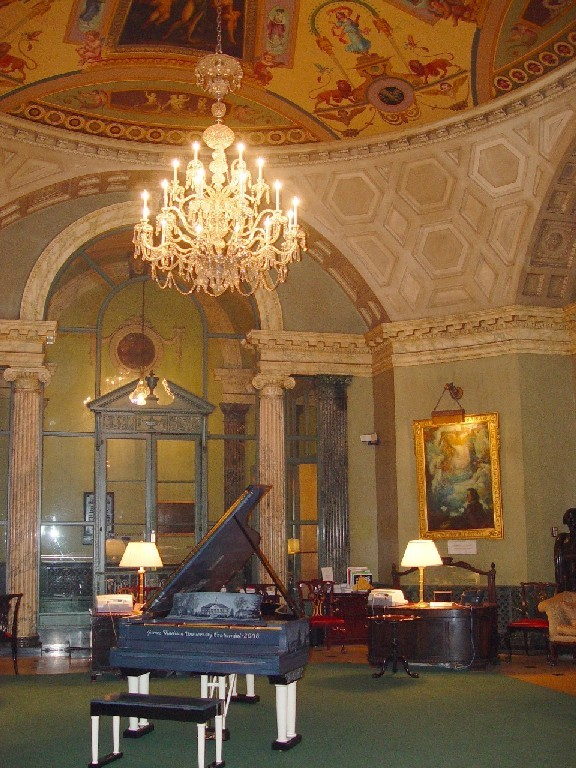
Rotunda interior before residential conversion

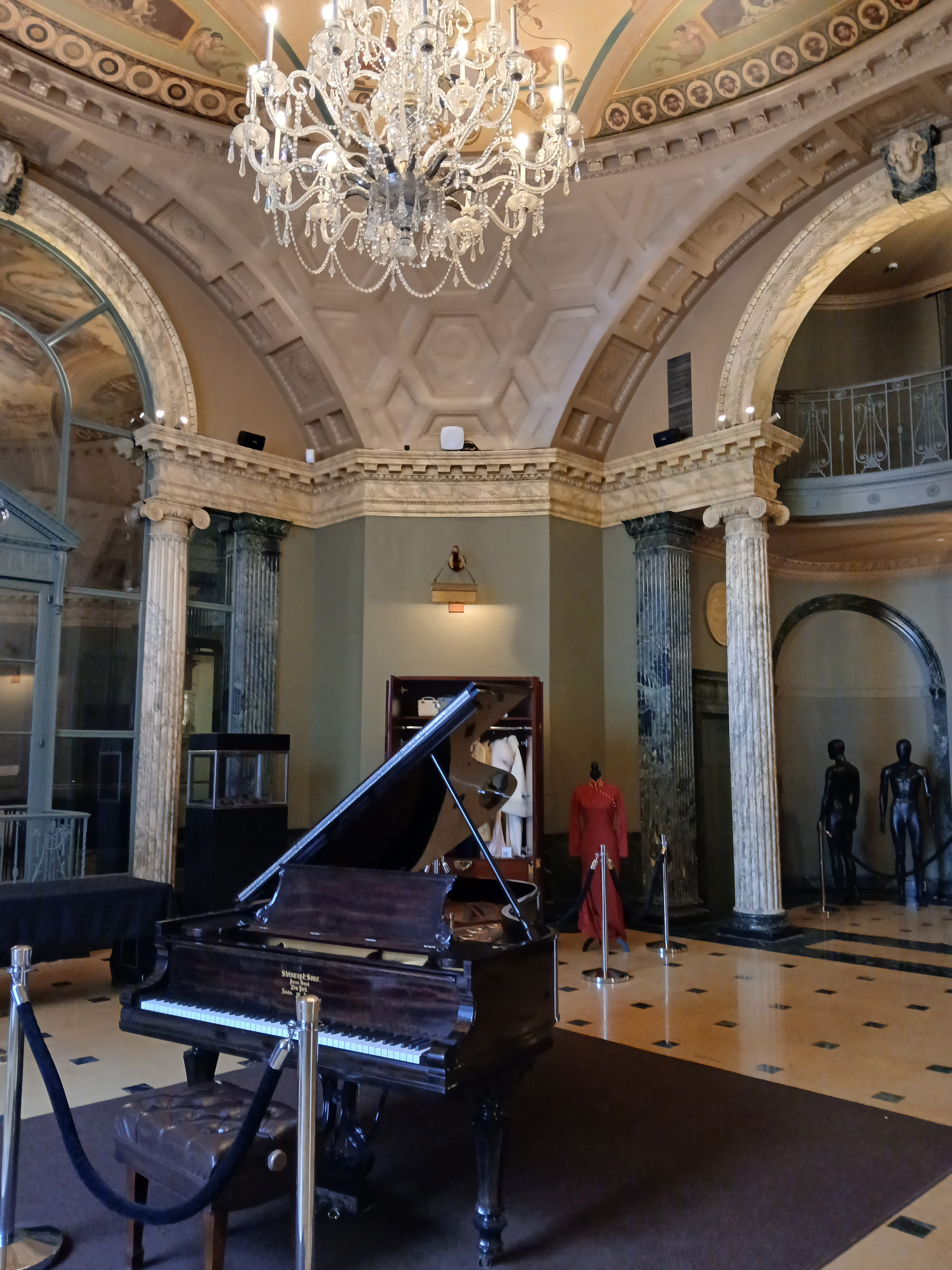
Rotunda interior after residential conversion

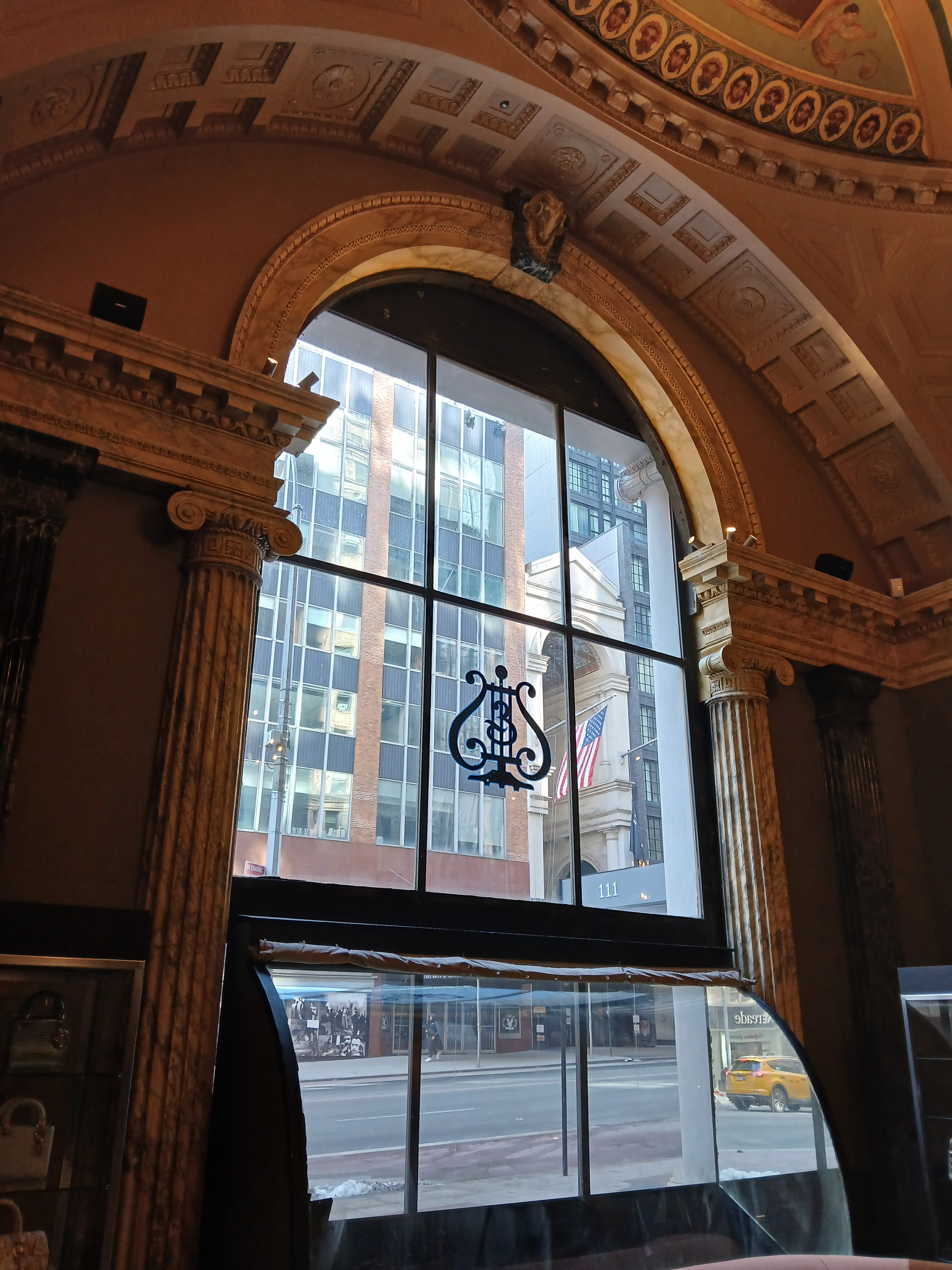
Window on the south wall

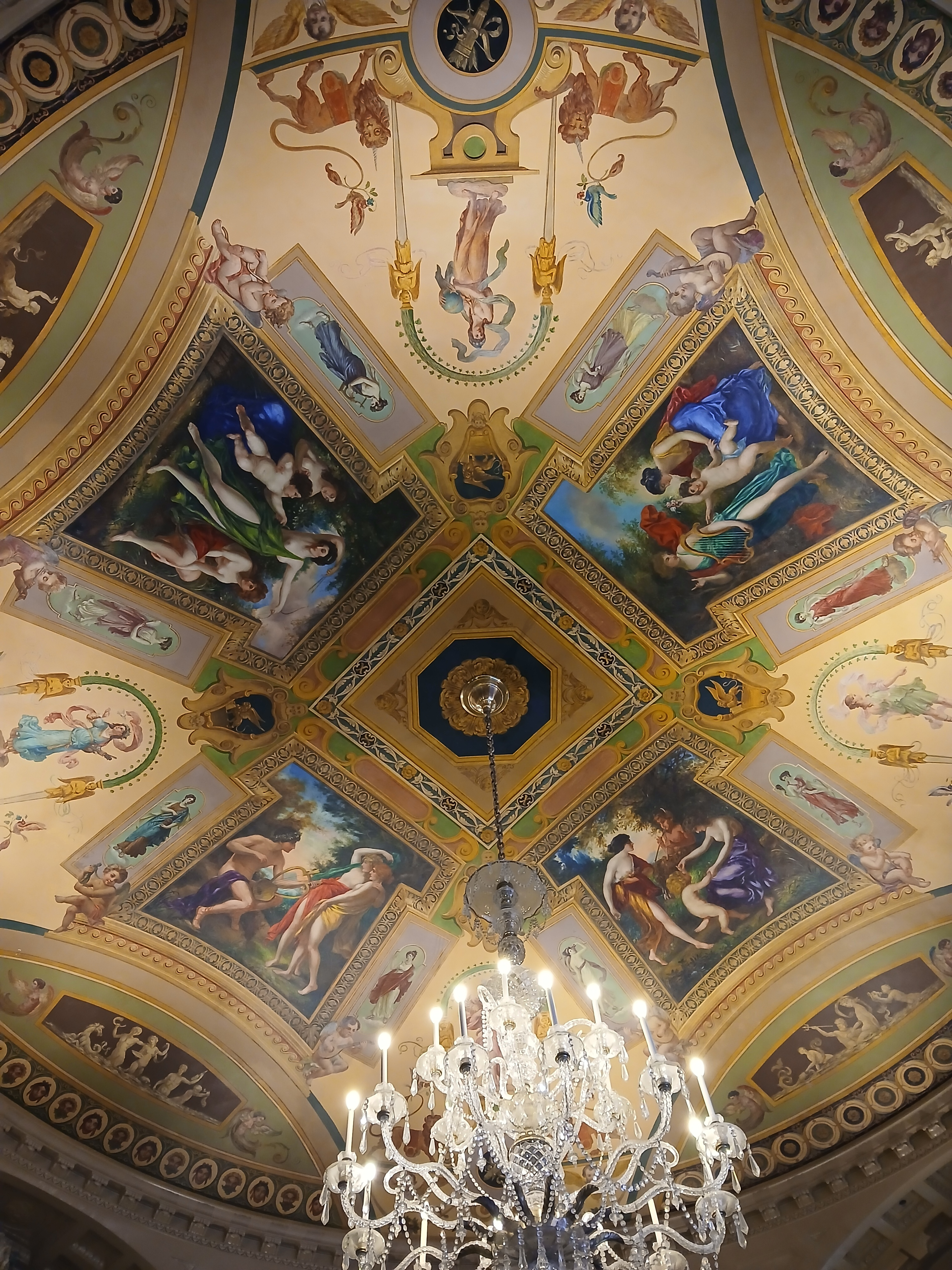
Detail of ceiling murals

The original western and eastern entrance vestibules on 57th Street have pink-granite floors and coffered domed ceilings. The eastern vestibule leads to a rectangular foyer with a vaulted ceiling, which in turn connects to the main rotunda and the original floor 2. The western vestibule leads north to a marble corridor that connects to Steinway Hall's original elevator lobby. The original elevator lobby had Botticino marble walls and black-and-white terrazzo flooring. A stone porte-cochère for residents is on 58th Street. There is a passenger and freight elevator connecting the cellar and ground-level loading dock.

Steinway Hall's octagonal rotunda has a domed ceiling measuring 35 feet (11 m) tall and 45 feet (14 m) across. The rotunda floor is made of yellow Kasota limestone from the U.S., with inlaid green marble rectangles from the Alps. The sides of the rotunda consist of four arches, each made of white Italian marble; pilasters made of green Greek marble, supporting coffered pendentives, and a continuous marble cornice just below the dome. A large chandelier hangs from the dome. Four paintings by Paul Arndt, depicting "the influence of music on human relations", are hung on the wall. The paintings are surrounded by grotesques and images painted by Cooper and Gentiluomo. The rotunda's southern wall contains the arched display window facing 57th Street. Behind the northern wall are three green-marble archways on floor 1 and a balcony on floor 2. The central arch on the north wall led to piano showrooms in the rear of floor 1, while the right arch led to the basement. The rotunda could seat up to 300 guests and a small symphony orchestra. When used by Steinway & Sons, the rotunda contained ornate furniture and paintings evocative of an upper-class home. After the residential tower was built in the 2010s, the rotunda was fitted with tinted interior windows, from which residents of 111 West 57th Street could view the space.

Steinway Hall's showrooms were clustered around a corridor that led from the rotunda. The corridor from the rotunda to these showrooms had dull red and old rose furniture, as well as green wall surfaces. The showrooms were covered with wood panels for better acoustics; as of 2026, the corridor from the rotunda is paneled in velvet. The first showroom past the rotunda and foyers was the Pine Room, which had pine-paneled walls, draped windows, illumination from chandeliers and ceiling bulbs, and an ivory-white plaster ceiling in low relief. Dimmers were provided so the light could be intensified for instrument examination. Two other showrooms had cream-colored, paneled walls and low-relief ceilings; one of these rooms had decorative paintings and medallions on the ceiling. Another showroom, known as the skylight room, had black-and-white wallpaper decorations depicting scenes in the French Empire style, as well as a skylight over more than half the room. The rear of the ground floor contained the Walnut Room, with walnut-paneled walls, windows facing 58th Street, and a beamed ceiling with pastel-color designs. Antique pieces throughout all the display rooms were arranged to complement the piano displays.

Following the construction of the residential tower, the rotunda was converted to a retail space with entrances from the residential lobby and the street. Numerous artists, including Nancy Lorenz and John Opella, were hired to design the decorations in the residential lobby. The residential lobby contains gold and silver-leaf murals with ebony and elephant motifs, a reference to the materials used in pianos; the murals include a depiction of two elephants escaping the Central Park Zoo. Also in the lobby is a mailroom, concierge area, shared toilet, and lounge. Wood from the building's former loading docks was reused in the floor of the lobby. Lorenz designed custom bronze doors for the elevator lobby. There is also a 80-foot-tall (24 m) retail lobby with a glass wall.

==== Amenities and Steinway Hall units ====
Floor 2 contained four display rooms, which generally were larger than the ground-floor showrooms. They generally had cream-colored walls and ceilings and were connected by a corridor with pea-green walls. The floor surfaces were laid in California redwood planks 2 inches (51 mm) thick, which could withstand the weight of the pianos. Floor 3 was initially Steinway Hall's executive offices while floors 4 and 8 (originally the fourth and fifth floors, respectively) were composed of soundproof music studios. The original musical salon on floor 3 could fit 240 or 250 people and was designed with blue-gray plaster walls, a cream-colored low-relief ceiling, a gold-leaf cornice, an oak parquet floor, and a lighting system with a dimmer. Following the residential conversion, floor 8 has contained a residents' rehearsal room and offices; the room's design references the building's historical use. The non-residential areas between the cellar and floor 4 are served by a single elevator.

Floors 10 and 10M constitute the building's common amenity area. There is an 82-by-12-foot (25.0 by 3.7 m) indoor pool housed within a 14-foot-tall (4.3 m) room. The pool has a limestone deck and cabanas, and there are sauna, steam, and treatment rooms adjacent to the pool. Floors 10 and 10M also contain a private dining room, fitness center, and study. The fitness center has a terrace at mezzanine level, while the private dining room adjoins a catering kitchen. In addition, there is a lounge with outdoor terrace, as well as a golf simulator. The building also has a padel court, which, at the time of construction, was New York City's only private padel court. Also within the amenity area is a bar inspired by the St. Regis New York's King Cole Bar, with skylights, murals, and a balcony. The amenity area is decorated with a chandelier that was relocated from the rotunda. The amenity areas on floors 10 and 10M are connected by their own elevator.

The remaining stories of Steinway Hall were originally rented as office space. The floors up to the 15th story (now floor 18) typically measured 11,500 square feet (1,070 m^{2}), with more space facing 58th Street than 57th Street. The 16th story (now floor 19) was much smaller and was intended as a studio apartment. After the residential conversion, the space above the amenity area was converted to 14 units, which range between 2,580 and 5,269 square feet (239.7 and 489.5 m^{2}). They consist of ten 3-bedroom units, three 1-bedroom units, and one studio apartment. Floor 11 has one 3-bedroom unit as well as the studio and 1-bedroom units, while floors 12, 14, 16, and 17 each have two 3-bedroom units. The largest unit, a three-bedroom duplex penthouse on floors 19 and 20, contains a stone entrance foyer, private terraces, an office, a den, a kitchen, and a living room with 26-foot (7.9 m) ceilings. These units are all connected to ground level and floor 10 by a pair of elevators.

==== Tower units ====
The 45 (originally 46) condominiums in the building's tower range from 3,873 to 7,128 square feet (359.8 to 662.2 m^{2}). The apartments start above the 17th story, numbered as floor 20, because the views of Central Park from the lower floors are obstructed by neighboring buildings. There is a maximum of one apartment on each floor. The units are mostly single-story, three-bedroom apartments, though there were originally seven duplex units on floors 60–61 and 72–83, which each have between two and four bedrooms. By 2025, the top two duplex units had been combined into a single unit on floors 80–83, with five bedrooms. Many of the stories are open in plan and have 14-foot (4.3 m) ceilings. Each floor is arranged in a dumbbell shape, with rooms to the north and south of the structural core, connected by a narrow passageway.

Many residences include spaces such as galleries and formal dining rooms with alcoves. In addition, materials like oak floors and panel doors are used throughout the apartments. P. E. Guerin Hardware designed the hardware, including bronze living-room doorknobs shaped like the tower's massing. The kitchens typically have quartzite counters as well as built-in appliances such as dishwashers, ovens, refrigerators, and freezers. The units also contain dark wood and onyx floors, alluding to the design of Steinway Hall, and the rooms are separated by doors measuring 9 feet (2.7 m) tall. A typical unit, such as the residence on floor 43, has a living room facing north toward Central Park and master and guest bedrooms facing south, as well as walk-in closets and custom bathroom appliances. Quartzite decorations are used throughout the bathrooms as well. Some tower units have been customized, such as a unit on floor 34 that was redesigned by Kelly Behun with a musically influenced theme.

A pair of elevators connect each of the tower stories to the ground level and floor 10. One is a double-deck elevator with a service cab on the lower deck, which also descends to the cellar, while the other is a single-deck elevator. In addition, each of the duplex units has a private elevator connecting both floors in the unit.

== History ==
=== Steinway Hall ===
Since 1864, Steinway & Sons had operated a piano showroom and performance auditorium at 14th Street in Lower Manhattan, where the piano industry was concentrated. When Carnegie Hall opened in 1891, the piano industry moved uptown to 57th Street, prompting Steinway & Sons to look for new sites in that area.

==== Construction and opening ====
By July 1916, the company had identified a site at 109–113 West 57th Street, between Sixth and Seventh Avenues, with a parcel extending back to 58th Street. The site had previously been occupied by residences. William K. Benedict and Marvin & Davis designed a 10-story building for the site. Work was delayed because the 1916 Zoning Resolution prohibited non-residential buildings on that section of 58th Street; additionally, neighborhood residents had filed lawsuits against Steinway & Sons, which were settled by July 1920. Steinway & Sons acquired eight lots on 57th and 58th Streets from 1920 to 1924, and Warren and Wetmore designed a 16-story building, for which plans were filed in July 1923. The new Steinway Hall was built from June 1924 to April 1925. Many of the studios had already been rented by late 1924.

The hall at 111 West 57th Street officially opened on October 27, 1925, with a performance by Willem Mengelberg and 35 musicians from the New York Philharmonic, broadcast over radio. The building had cost $3 million, representing about a quarter of Steinway & Sons' total assets at the time. Steinway & Sons used the five lowest floors and rented out the upper floors. The basement housed storage, shipping, and a grand-piano testing area; the first story, a reception room and salesroom; the second story, salesrooms; the third floor, executive offices; and the fourth and fifth stories, music studios. Steinway & Sons used only the rear of the fourth story, where it had a large workroom. The "piano bank" in the basement had over 300 pianos, valued at over $15 million.

==== Usage ====
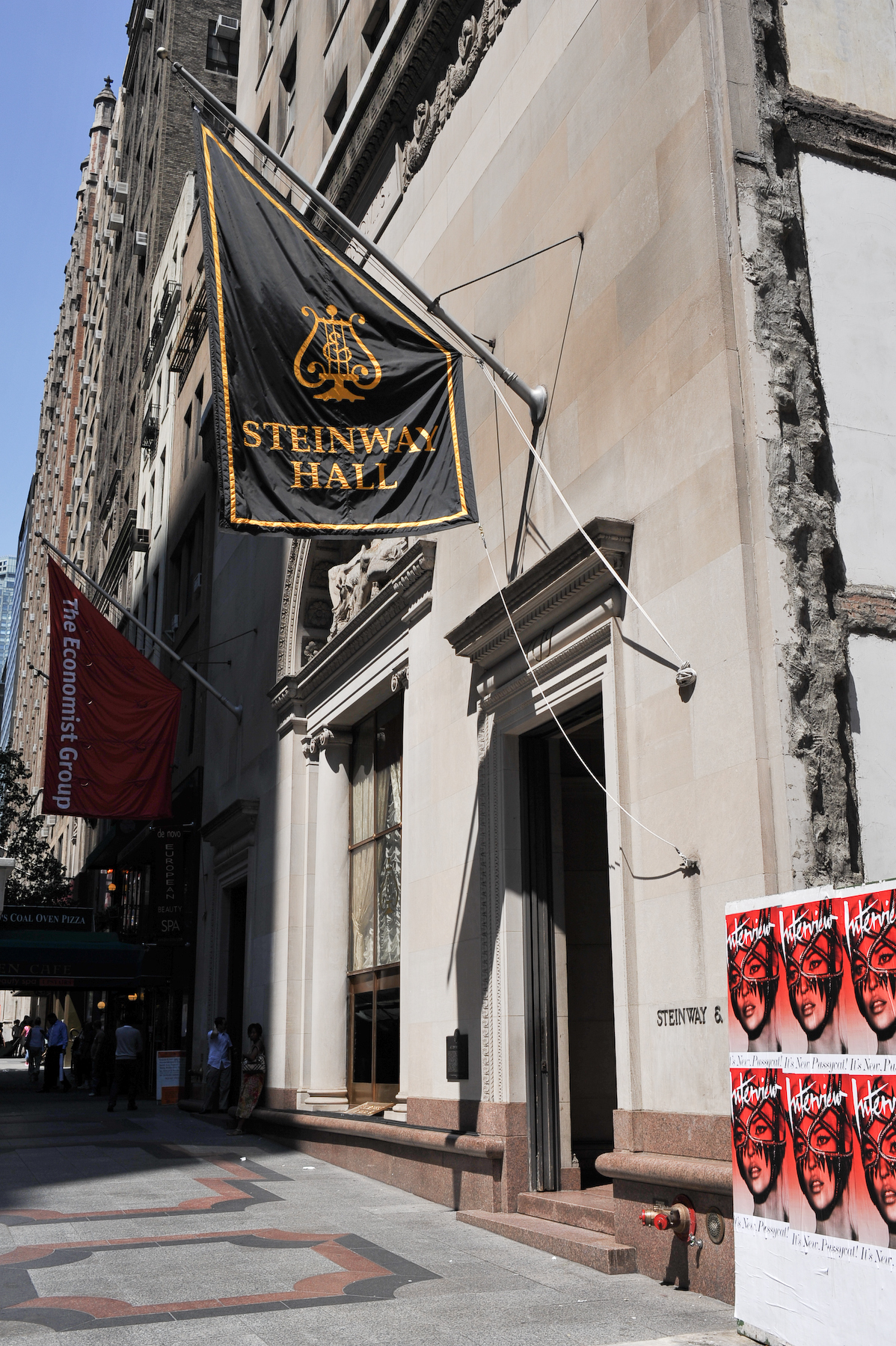
Entrance to Steinway Hall at 111 West 57th Street, seen in 2008, before the residential tower's development

According to a New Yorker article in 2001, "almost every twentieth-century virtuoso has passed through" the first-floor reception room while headed to the Concert and Artists Department in the basement. Among the notable performances at the 57th Street building was the 1928 duo piano recital by Vladimir Horowitz and Sergei Rachmaninoff. The 57th Street building was also intended as a speculative development for Steinway & Sons; it was not particularly successful in that respect, with a rate of return of only 2 percent. Even so, by 1940, all studios in the Steinway Building had been leased. Throughout the years, the building's tenants included publications such as Musical America, Architectural Forum, and The Economist, as well as CBS broadcasting studios. Other artistic tenants, included Louis Harvy Chalif's School of Dancing, also occupied space on the upper floors.

Steinway Hall received an $850,000 first mortgage from Hubbard, Westervelt & Mottelay Inc. in 1939. The onset of World War II forced the temporary closure of the building's recital hall. In March 1957, the Manhattan Life Insurance Company leased some space on the third floor for its tabulating and accounting departments. Steinway Hall and its land were sold to Manhattan Life the following year, with the insurance company planning to occupy the building as its home office. At that time, Musical Forum, Columbia Artists Management, and the Philharmonic Symphony Society of New York were among Steinway Hall's tenants. 111 West 57th Street subsequently became the Manhattan Life Insurance Company Building, but Steinway & Sons continued to lease space there, including the ground-floor showroom.

Steinway Hall was acquired by 111 West 57th Street Associates in 1980, and Bernard H. Mendik simultaneously paid $8.65 million for the leasehold. The Apollo sculpture above the main entrance was restored, and the plaque above the entrance was replaced, in 1990 after The Economist moved to 111 West 57th Street. In 1997, Jeffrey Biegel performed the first classical music recital transmitted live over the internet, with audio and video, at Steinway Hall. Steinway repurchased the building in early 1999 for about $62–63 million, allowing the company to begin collecting rent from tenants. Steinway also leased the land for 99 years from the building's former owner, which retained ownership of the plot. The New York City Landmarks Preservation Commission (LPC) designated Steinway Hall as a New York City landmark in November 2001, thereby legally protecting it from demolition. Manhattan Life moved out of the building that year, and an XM Satellite Radio studio opened there.

=== Residential tower planning ===
==== Early plans ====
In May 2005, Investcorp and Ceebraid-Signal purchased the one-story Ritz Fur Shop building at 107 West 57th Street, next to Steinway Hall, for $23 million, along with $8.75 million for neighboring air rights. According to The Real Deal, the sale was finalized in 2006 for $52 million. The companies planned a 35-story tower on the site with 37 residential units, three lower floors of office space, and ground floor and basement retail space. In October 2006, Barry Sternlicht's Starwood Capital Group purchased the site at 105–107 West 57th Street for $52 million with a $30 million loan from Eurohypo. Demolition of the site was underway the same year. Before the 2008 financial crisis, Starwood Capital reportedly planned to construct a new hotel tower for sister company Starwood as part of a new "Hotel Crillon" luxury brand based on Paris's Hôtel de Crillon. According to the writer Katherine Clarke, the site was so small that any potential tower on the site could not realistically be more than 700 feet (210 m) tall.

In early 2012, Starwood sold a majority interest in the assemblage to JDS Development Group for $40 million and stayed on as a joint venture partner. David Juracich, an acquaintance of JDS's chief executive Michael Stern, maintained an indirect stake in the project. That March, the first plans for the site at 105–107 West 57th Street were filed with the New York City Department of Buildings for a 51-story tower rising 671 feet (205 m) and containing 27 condominiums. Renderings of the planned development were revealed that September. Designed by CetraRuddy, the tower would have had a sloped facade, covered with balconies facing Central Park. At the time, construction was expected to take place from early 2013 to late 2014. Because the site was only 43 feet (13 m) wide, the floor plans would have been severely constrained, to the point that there might not have been enough space for mechanical rooms or elevators. In addition, the 671-foot height would not stand out against neighboring high-rises, a point of contention for Stern.

==== JDS and PMG takeover ====
At the end of 2012, Steinway & Sons announced that it would sell Steinway Hall, adjacent to the planned development at 107 West 57th Street, for $46 million. At the time, Steinway & Sons was losing $5 million a year from continuing to own Steinway Hall. A joint venture of JDS Development, PMG, and Arthur P. Becker officially purchased Steinway Hall in March 2013. JDS paid $131.5 million to Wexford Capital for the land underneath the building, an adjacent structure, and air rights in July 2013. After the purchase, Starwood Capital Group exited the joint venture, leaving JDS and PMG as the developers, and Steinway & Sons was allowed to remain in the building for 18 months. As for the other eleven tenants, JDS and PMG either bought out the leases or waited for them to expire.

Not long after the developers bought Steinway Hall, they secured a $230 million acquisition loan from Annaly Capital Management on the development site. Stern and Maloney did not yet have the cash to fund the tower's construction, and Maloney reached out to Becker, who contacted British financier Andy Ruhan about the possibility of investing in the site. Although Ruhan had promised to be a primary investor, he subsequently lowered his investment and took a 26.3 percent stake with Becker. Becker and Ruhan agreed to give 49.9% of their profits to Russian oligarchs Serguei Adoniev and Albert Avdolyan, who had lent them $21 million via a set of LLCs. While this was not strictly illegal, the agreement was not divulged to 111 West 57th Street's other investors, who may have otherwise balked because of negative rumors about Adoniev's business dealings. AmBase Corporation purchased a 59 percent stake in the development for $56 million in June 2013. Stern and Maloney retained the remaining 14.7 percent stake.

==== New plans ====
The acquisition of Steinway Hall and air rights allowed JDS and PMG to develop a substantially taller building. so they decided to create new plans. JDS and PMG considered several architects, including CetraRuddy, Gehry, and HOK, before ultimately hiring SHoP Architects. In an interview, Stern said that he had selected SHoP because the firm was "not afraid to push boundaries", as in its design of the Barclays Center arena. Though Stern and Maloney could theoretically have built a skyscraper on the narrow lot adjoining Steinway Hall, they wanted to convince the LPC to let them build a tower through the center of that building, set back from 57th Street. The LPC had to approve all plans involving modifications of Steinway Hall, but the agency was known for its strict disapproval of almost any plan that involved demolishing an official landmark. As such, any additions would need to be constructed around the existing structure.

In August 2013, the developers filed permits for a 74-story, 1,200-foot (370 m) tower that would hold 100 condominiums above six floors of retail. SHoP's plans incorporated the existing structure into the base of the new tower. Further complicating the planning process, the LPC had considered landmark status for Steinway Hall's rotunda in mid-2013; such a designation would require the developers to preserve the space. JDS and PMG expressed support for the landmark status, and the LPC designated the rotunda as a landmark that September. The same month, The Wall Street Journal published updated renderings for the tower. The new design would stretch 1,350 feet (410 m) tall with 45 full-floor apartments, giving the 60-foot-wide (18 m) tower a slenderness ratio of 1:23. JDS and Property Markets Group presented their plans to the LPC in October 2013, promising to restore Steinway Hall's rotunda in exchange for the LPC's approval. Despite doubts from preservationists and some LPC board members, the commission approved the plans, allowing the developers to apply for full construction permits. The rotunda was closed after the Steinway store moved out.

=== Tower construction ===
==== Early progress ====
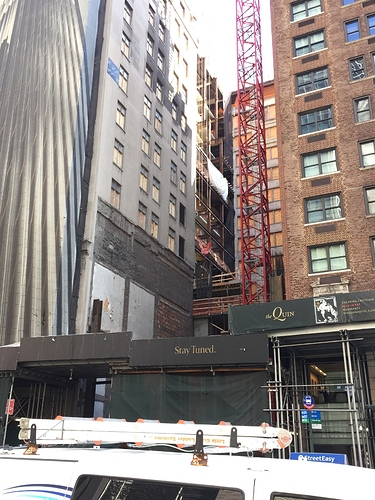
The construction site in June 2016

JDS and PMG began looking for funding after obtaining the requisite approvals, and they held a groundbreaking ceremony for the project in early 2014. That July, the developers installed a crane to construct the tower; measuring 220 feet (67 m), it was the tallest freestanding crane ever used in New York City. Maloney asked the Emirati businessman Khadem al-Qubaisi to help finance the Steinway project, but Maloney's partners would not accept al-Qubaisi's offer. In January 2015, the New York City Department of Buildings approved final permits for the project. The new permits called for an 80-story tower with a 1,397-foot (426 m) roof, as well as 24-foot (7.3 m) crown bringing its pinnacle to 1,421 feet (433 m). At the time, the tower was to contain 55 luxury condominiums and would be finished in 2017. Due to technicalities in New York City zoning law, the new tower was classified as an alteration to the existing Steinway Hall, which also had the address 111 West 57th Street. With the tower's construction, that building's floor area would increase 2,850 percent. The tower's proposed height was slightly increased in March 2015 to 1,428 feet (435 m). The developers created a mockup of the facade panels, and they also opened a sales office on Fifth Avenue.

Meanwhile, construction costs had risen by over $50 million because of complications in working around Steinway Hall. The site had to be excavated manually to avoid disturbing Steinway Hall's tenants; materials had to be staged inside the building; and the crane could not operate if the wind speed was over 35 miles per hour (56 km/h). To cover the extra costs, the developers had issued six capital calls totaling $63.6 million. After AmBase participated only in the first four capital calls, providing a small amount of funding each time, JDS and PMG lowered AmBase's stake from 60.3 percent to 43.5 percent. By May 2015, AmBase was looking to reduce its involvement in 111 West 57th Street. The developers received a $725 million construction loan from American International Group (AIG) and Apollo Global Management shortly afterward, following a year of negotiations. AIG provided the $400 million senior loan, while Apollo gave a $325 million mezzanine loan; the Qatar Investment Authority provided $161.5 million of the mezzanine loan to one of Apollo's subsidiaries. JDS and PMG raised an additional $125–150 million themselves.

Apollo's chief operating officer initially estimated that the apartments would sell for $7,000 to $10,000 per square foot ($75,000 to $108,000/m^{2}), and the developers were considering selling units for up to $100 million apiece. Corcoran Group, a brokerage operated by Barbara Corcoran, had been the original broker for the apartments, earning a flat monthly fee of $10,000 until the condominium offering plan was accepted. The brokerage would thereafter earn a 2.1% commission from each apartment sale. The Attorney General of New York's office approved the building's condominium offering plan in late 2015, which indicated that the units would sell for a total of $1.45 billion, with the maximum price for one apartment being $60 million. In March 2016, Maloney told Bloomberg News that sales at the building would not commence until the following year due to a general slowdown in the luxury residential market. By June 2016, the project had risen above street level.

==== Progress and financial issues ====
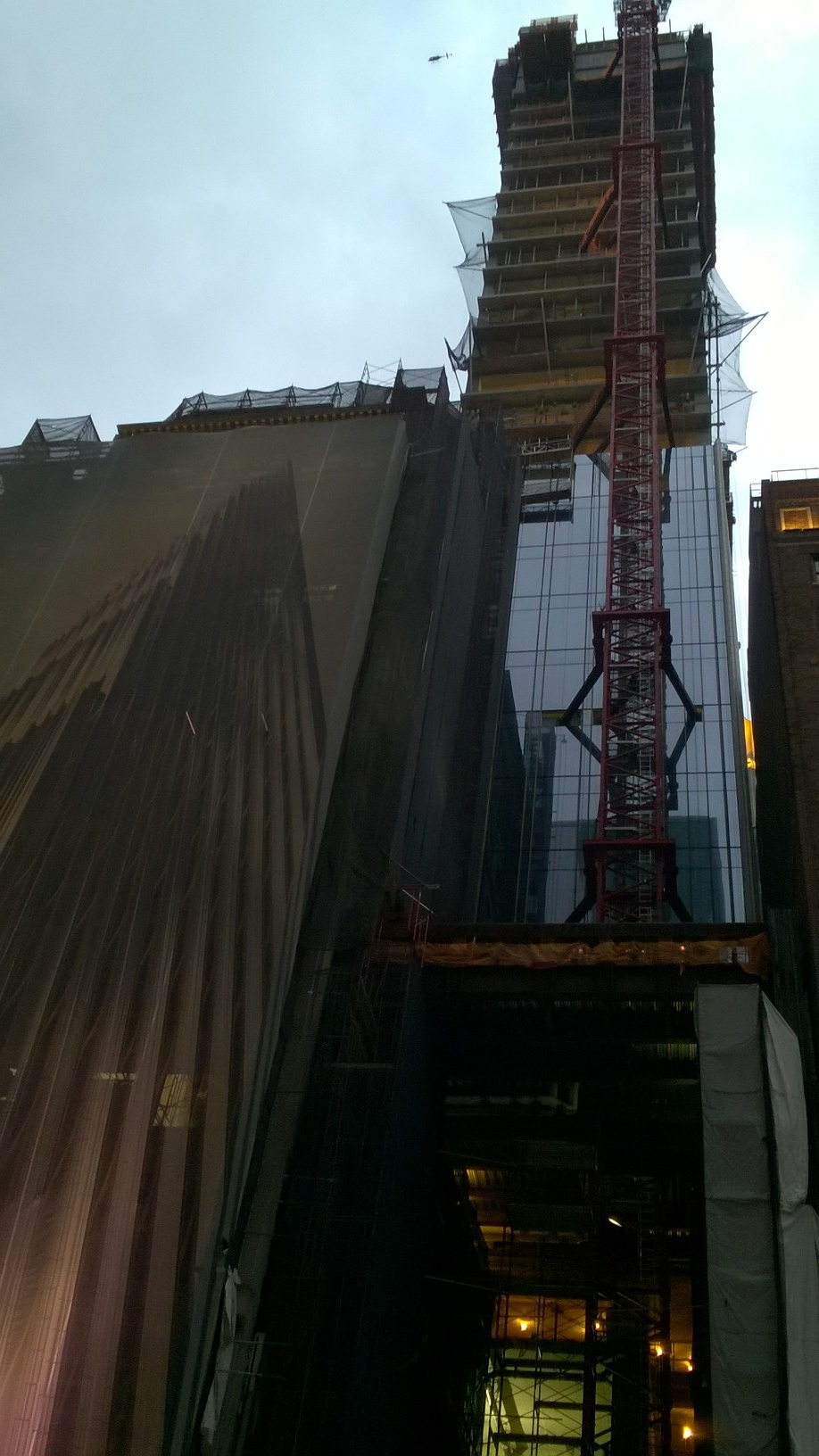
Construction in November 2017, shortly after glass installation began

The project faced financial difficulties and a lawsuit from AmBase, as well as squabbling between Stern and Maloney regarding the delays and budget. In January 2017, the developers defaulted on the $325 million mezzanine loan from Apollo, and investors were no longer receptive to the developers' capital calls. JDS and PMG negotiated a forbearance agreement on $300 million of the debt, while the remaining $25 million was sold to Spruce Capital Management. The terms of the agreement with Spruce were unusually strict, allowing the company to take full control of the building within 20 days of a foreclosure proceeding, and without any public auction, unless the developers filed an objection. The developers were trying to negotiate another $100 million mezzanine loan from Baupost Group to repay Spruce, but the loan was vetoed by AmBase.

Meanwhile, the landmarked facade of Steinway Hall was restored in early 2017. JDS also restored Steinway Hall's eighth-story recital hall after Marci Clark, the director of JDS's marketing department, discovered archival photos of the hall. Construction had stalled by July 2017, after the tower had been built to 20 stories. At the time, Spruce claimed that it had not received payment on the $25 million mezzanine loan and filed paperwork to begin the process of foreclosure, leading AmBase to file another lawsuit against Maloney, Stern, and Spruce. The New York Supreme Court ruled in favor of Spruce, allowing that firm to transfer the development entirely to Maloney and Stern, wiping out AmBase's investment completely. By November 2017, the tower had reached a height of roughly 500 feet (150 m), and initial glass facade installation had begun. At that point, the developers had spent close to $1 billion and were still far from completing the tower. Despite the building's monetary and legal issues, a number of apartments in the tower had already gone to contract.

In March 2018, the tower's height surpassed the halfway point at over 700 feet (210 m). Two months later, Madison Realty Capital provided a $90 million preferred equity investment, allowing construction to continue. In exchange, Stern and Maloney had to pay Madison Realty all the funds available at the project's completion, in addition to as much as 30% of annual profits, and Madison Realty could veto any significant changes that Stern or Maloney contemplated. Shortly after, Corcoran Group was also fired as the building's broker and was replaced by Douglas Elliman, prompting Corcoran to sue. The developers filed paperwork with the Attorney General of New York to raise prices at the project in August 2018. Sales at the project were officially relaunched shortly afterward, with prices ranging from $18 million to over $56 million; a few apartments were placed on sale at a time. By then, the building was more commonly known by its address than as "Steinway Tower". (Note: Some later sources, such as Business Insider, continued to refer to the tower as "Steinway Tower".)

==== Completion ====
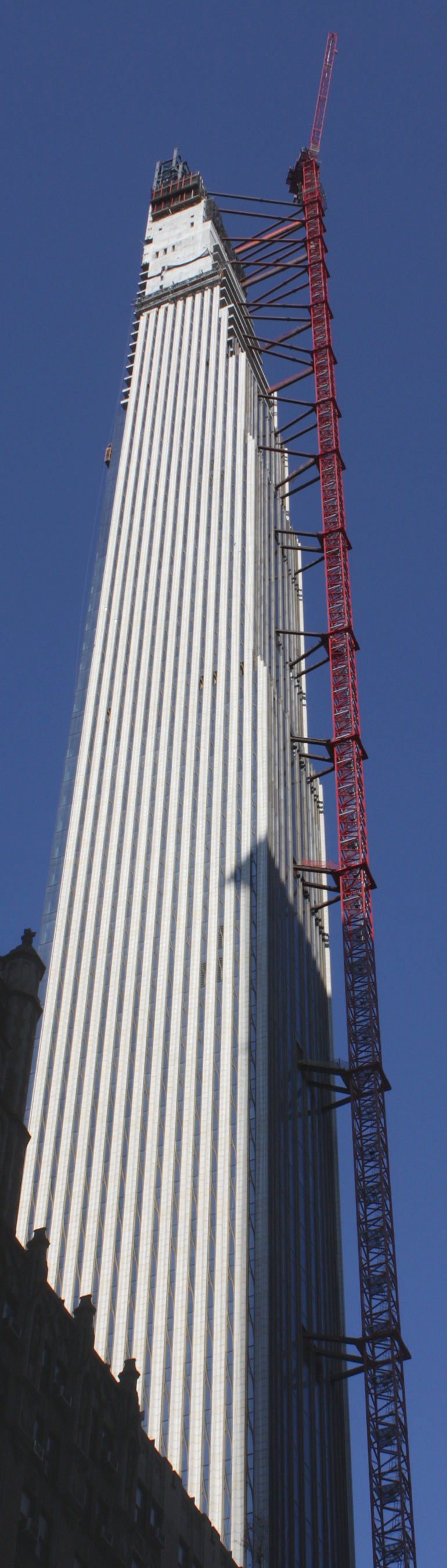
Topped out in 2019; western facade from 57th Street

The building's concrete form topped out during April 2019, and the steel reached the top of the parapet that October. Despite an unfavorable luxury real estate market, the building's 7,175-square-foot (666.6 m^{2}) penthouse entered contract in mid-2019 for "close to" its offer of $58 million, making it one of the most expensive New York condo sales of 2019. In August 2019, the developers hired Newmark Group to find tenants for the building's 50,000 square feet (4,600 m^{2}) of retail space on the building's first four floors and basement. One month later, JDS asked lenders for a $1.1 billion loan to replace AIG's $725 million in construction debt. In 2020, Steinway Hall's landmarked rotunda was restored by John Canning Studios, which mitigated water damage, repaired the ceiling and entablatures, and cleaned the walls and metalwork. The facade and roof of the hall were also restored. The building's condominium offering became effective in February 2020 after 15% of the units had been sold, and the first sale for a unit in Steinway Hall was finalized that April.

Construction slowed considerably due to the onset of the COVID-19 pandemic in early 2020, as well as a crane collapse later that year. Prospective buyers were not allowed to tour the building for about 16 months due to pandemic restrictions. This caused the project to fall into danger of missing key construction deadlines and a corresponding decline in sales. Despite a general decrease in real estate activity due to the pandemic, there were several multi-million-dollar sales at 111 West 57th Street during mid-2020, and a penthouse went into contract for $50 million that December. Another apartment was the subject of a bidding war between the cryptocurrency businessman Gavin Wood and an unidentified buyer, who eventually beat out Wood. The facade of the tower was being completed by September 2020, and the crane was being disassembled from the facade by March 2021.

In May 2021, Todd Morley proposed constructing a non-fungible token museum at 111 West 57th Street, which would have used the top of the building as an antenna. In addition, the developer Steve Witkoff was hired as a consultant during the building's completion. By then, Stern and Maloney planned to complete the interior in stages, prioritizing the completion of apartments for which sales contracts were being signed. Corcoran Group was reinstated as the building's broker in February 2022, and the podium was being completed by that March. By the next month, workers had installed the final elements of the facade, and the first condominium sales were being finalized. By May 2022, nearly half of the condominiums had been sold. The interiors were completed in November 2022, and all construction was finished by the end of the year.

=== Residential use ===
When the building was finished, Maloney said he considered it to have been commercially unsuccessful. Following slow sales, Apollo Global wrote off part of its mezzanine loan on 111 West 57th Street in August 2023. A model apartment by Rafael de Cardenas, occupying floor 66, was completed the same month. That October, M&T Bank provided a $30 million loan for the project. The tower's early condominium owners included the government of Canada (which bought an apartment for its consul general) and the developer Christian Candy. Nikki Field of Sotheby's International Realty took over as the building's condominium sales agent in July 2024, at which point 23 units remained unsold. Over the next two years, Field's team sold 22 units (many at discounted rates) for a combined $480 million.

Bonhams auction house leased the former piano showroom in September 2024. The building had 10 unsold apartments by April 2025, and two of the original condo owners were recorded as having sold their apartments by August. The Bonhams space in the building opened in February 2026, opening the rotunda to the public for the first time in over a decade. By January 2026, only two apartments remained unsold, of which one was sold that April. Maloney retrospectively said that "financially, it was a disaster", referring to the financial shortfalls during construction and the fact that it had taken a decade to sell all the apartments.

== Issues and incidents ==
=== Lawsuits ===
==== AmBase lawsuits ====
AmBase sued Stern and Maloney in April 2016, alleging that the developers neglected to account for cost overruns reaching $50 million. AmBase sought damages of $105 million in relation to the two capital calls in which they did not participate, claiming that these capital calls served mainly to dilute their stake. AmBase's founder Richard Bianco accused Stern and Maloney of using illegitimate third-party funding sources to finance their own ownership stake, and AmBase also claimed that Becker and Ruhan did not have their 26 percent stake diluted despite not participating in the capital calls. This initial litigation prompted a series of suits that lasted several years. JDS and PMG countersued in January 2017, alleging that since there had never been an officially approved budget, there was no measure by which to determine cost overruns.

AmBase filed another lawsuit in mid-2017, claiming that Maloney and Stern were colluding with the lender, Spruce Capital Management, to allow a foreclosure which would wipe out AmBase's $66 million equity investment while preserving Maloney and Stern's $35 million stake. After AmBase was granted an initial injunction, the New York Supreme Court's trial division ruled in August 2017 that Maloney and Stern could receive full control of the project, thereby eliminating AmBase's investment. The Appellate Division also ruled against AmBase in January 2018.

AmBase refiled the second lawsuit in federal court in early 2018, claiming that Maloney and Stern's alleged collusion with Spruce violated the Racketeer Influenced and Corrupt Organizations Act and seeking a $136 million judgment. At the time, Bianco faced his own lawsuit from hedge fund IsZo Capital, which claimed the company had purposefully forced the 2017 foreclosure by denying the Baupost Group loan, for Bianco's own benefit. In October 2018, AmBase's federal lawsuit was dismissed after the court found no evidence of collusion between Maloney, Stern, and Spruce. After the dismissal of their three previous lawsuits, AmBase again sued Spruce Capital, Maloney, and Stern in May 2019, restating previous allegations of collusion and seeking additional damages for the developers' alleged breach of their fiduciary duties. AmBase then appealed to the United States Court of Appeals for the Second Circuit, which declined the appeal in September 2019. The lawsuits continued into the 2020s; the litigation was so extensive that one judge had compared one of AmBase's revised complaints to a copy of the book War and Peace. The New York Court of Appeals allowed the litigation to proceed in June 2026, and a trial was set for that November.

==== Other lawsuits ====
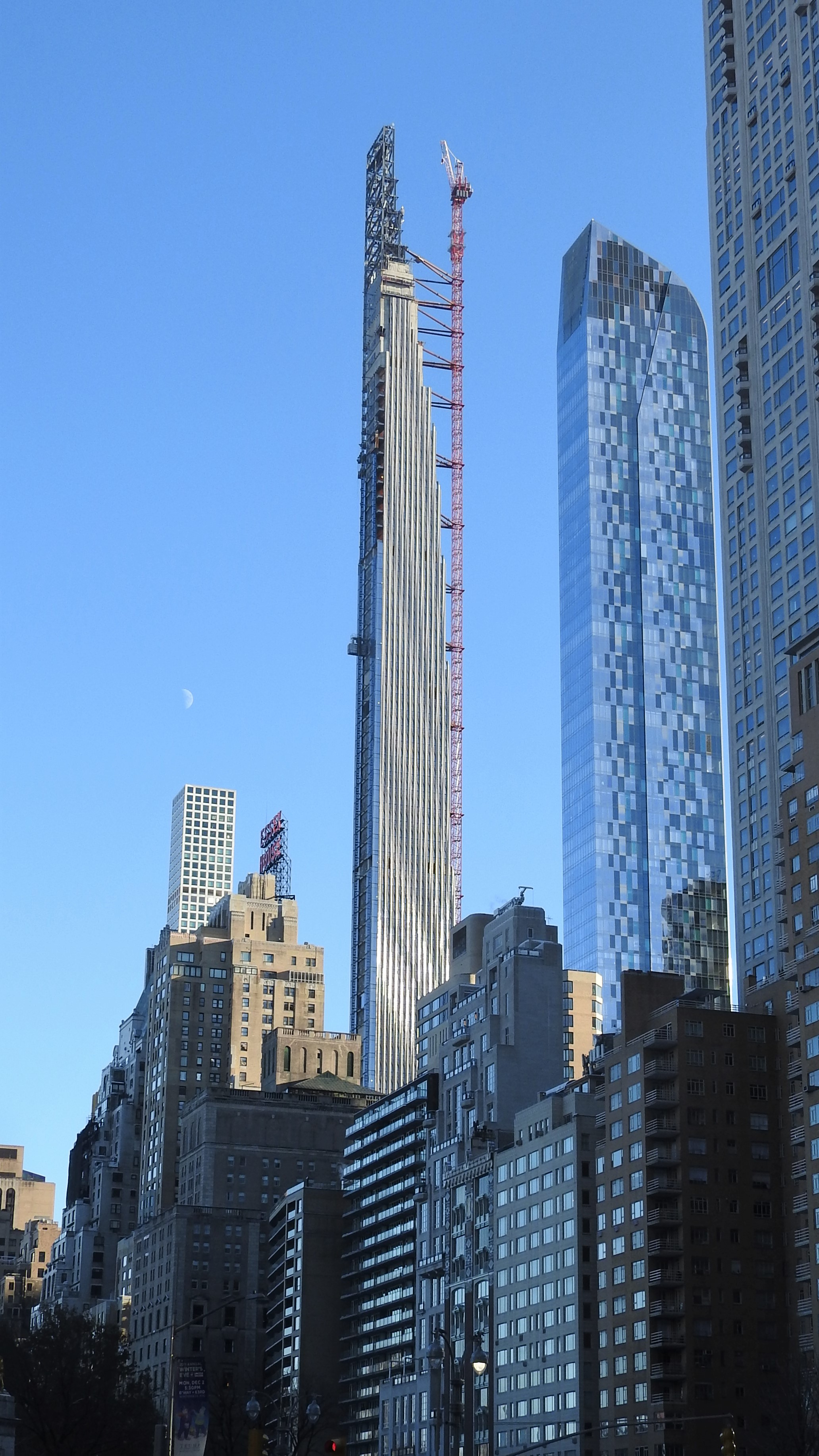
Seen in December 2019 from Columbus Circle. From left to right, 432 Park Avenue, the sign above the Essex House, One57, and 220 Central Park South can be seen in the background.

After the Corcoran Group was fired in May 2018, Barbara Corcoran sued the building's developers for $30 million the next month, claiming that her brokerage company's contract to market the building's units had been unfairly terminated. The developers claimed that the Corcoran Group had been fired after failing to sell 25 percent of the building's units by the middle of 2018 as required by their contract. However, Corcoran claimed that due to the numerous lawsuits, delays, and cost overruns, the developers had halted marketing and sales for the units which made it impossible for the brokerage to reach their sales hurdles. Corcoran also sued Douglas Elliman for tortious interference, claiming the company had hired away the building's sales director in violation of her non-compete clause.

In December 2020, JDS sued HVAC contractor Copper II and the contractor's insurer Talisman Casualty for over $11.7 million. In its lawsuit, the developers claimed that Copper II had delayed its installation of the HVAC system, causing sustained water damage on several floors. In August 2021, JDS sued crane contractor US Crane & Rigging and one of its subsidiaries for $50 million, claiming that the contractor's negligence had caused glass panels on the facade to break the previous October (see § Safety incidents). In addition, during the COVID-19 pandemic, aggrieved investors met across the world to discuss issues with the building's construction, with several investors filing separate lawsuits against the developers.

=== Labor disputes ===
The developers intended for the tower to become New York City's tallest building constructed with non-union labor. Non-unionized workers were cheaper to hire and did not need to be compensated double overtime, hourly pension fees, and benefit fees. This decision attracted scrutiny from New York City's politically powerful construction unions. The Building and Construction Trades Council of Greater New York's leader, Gary LaBarbera, criticized the developers for not using union labor or providing adequate safety training. The union detailed multiple incidents that had occurred at the site including "a worker falling from scaffold that lacked a railing, one worker who fell in a partial building collapse and another who had his leg crushed when a steel beam slipped." Manhattan Borough President Gale Brewer sided with LaBarbera, sending Stern a letter expressing concern over the workers' safety, training, and pay. New York City Public Advocate Letitia James echoed Brewer's concerns and agreed that the usage of non-union labor could lead to increased danger for workers. Union workers protested the project by staging inflatable rats at events where Stern appeared, and heckling him at speeches, on 57th Street, or outside Stern's residence. In exchange, Stern publicly criticized the unions.

Cyrus Vance Jr., then the New York County District Attorney, indicted subcontractor Parkside Construction in May 2018 for several financial crimes. The indictment included charges of stealing $1.7 million from 520 workers on the project by purposely shorting their hours and failing to pay them overtime, hiding nearly $42 million in wages from state insurance officials to avoid paying workers' compensation premiums, and using undocumented immigrants. The company's owners, Francesco and Salvatore Pugliese, were charged with grand larceny, insurance fraud and scheme to defraud, and several Parkside staff were also charged in the scheme. Parkside had previously been sued in 2015 in a class-action lawsuit by former workers on the site, who had alleged widespread wage theft. In February 2021, the Pugliese brothers pleaded guilty to insurance fraud and were forced to pay the insurance fund $1.4 million in exchange for a conditional discharge. The brothers did not receive a prison sentence, nor were they forced to give restitution to their employees.

=== Safety incidents ===
On January 21, 2019, a suspended scaffold attached to the building broke free from the exterior, collided with windows, and showered pieces of broken glass over nearby sidewalks due to high winds. The New York City Buildings Department initiated a partial stop work order, and issued the site a violation for failure to safeguard construction equipment. Pieces of concrete also allegedly fell off the building while the concrete was being poured, hitting the nearby Hampshire House, and a terracotta block fell from the tower in January 2020, denting the roof of a passing taxi. Another high wind on October 29, 2020, knocked the tower's construction crane loose, causing it to smash into the facade and scatter debris on the street below. Investigators subsequently traced the cause of the crane's partial collapse to an unsecured cable. Two weeks later, on November 15, a glass curtain wall fell 56 floors into a nearby street. On December 24, 2020, another pane of glass fell from the 58th Street side of the building, although nobody was hurt.

In February 2022, a slab of ice was suspected to have fallen from 111 West 57th Street, damaging a car on the ground and injuring its driver. The Department of Buildings fined the building's owners after that incident.

== Reception ==
Writing for Vanity Fair, architectural critic Paul Goldberger referred to the plans for the tower as "quite possibly the most elegant" of Billionaires' Row's structures. Goldberger described it as "a subtle and graceful re-interpretation in modern form of the stepped-back, "wedding cake" towers of New York's past". C. J. Hughes of The New York Times said that the tower rejected "the crystalline look so popular with new developments in the neighborhood". Architectural critic Carter Horsley wrote that the tower was "a very original design by SHoP" and that it "definitely has a feminine character" with its crown resembling a tiara. Skyscraper Museum founder Carol Willis was optimistic that several Billionaires' Row buildings would become New York City designated landmarks in the 2050s, saying: "I have no doubt that some—such as 432 Park Avenue and 111 W 57 Street—will be designated as superior examples of the iconic forms characteristic of New York of the 2010s." Bianca Bosker of The Atlantic called 111 West 57th Street "a luxury condominium resembling the love child of a dustbuster and a Mach3 razor".

Some critics also wrote about the building's slenderness ratio. Justin Davidson of New York magazine wrote: "No tower will be the last, biggest, or tallest for long, but this one might be the best." A writer for The Wall Street Journal in 2021 said: "These are not the proportions of a classical column but of a coffee stirrer."

The construction of 111 West 57th Street also garnered criticism. In 2015, when the tower was still in development, a neighborhood group protested the fact that the Steinway Tower and other Billionaires' Row towers would cast long shadows over Central Park. When the building was nearly complete, in 2019, a writer for Business Insider visited one of the condominium units, saying: "I can't say that my tour of its first condo felt too different from another Billionaires' Row apartment I've visited." Edwin Heathcote of the Financial Times described the new residential skyscraper as a "skinnyscraper" that was the "purest illustration of architecture as an expression of surplus capital". Heathcote lamented that its purpose—rather than being a bustling city unto itself that would unite people, as was the goal for skyscrapers built in the 1920s and 1930s—was the "exclusion of 99.99 per cent".

== See also ==
- List of New York City Designated Landmarks in Manhattan from 14th to 59th Streets
- List of tallest buildings
  - in New York City
  - in the United States
  - in the world
  - with a residential purpose
