= Kevin Malone (disambiguation) =

Kevin Malone is a fictional character in the American television series The Office.

Kevin Malone may also refer to:

- Kevin Malone (baseball) (born 1957), American former baseball general manager

== See also ==
- Kelvin Malone (1961–1999), American spree killer
- Kevin Malone (composer) (dates unknown), classical music composer
- Kevin P. Maloney (born 1958), American real estate developer
