= Leon Coffee House =

Mexican coffee shop in Seattle, Washington, U.S.

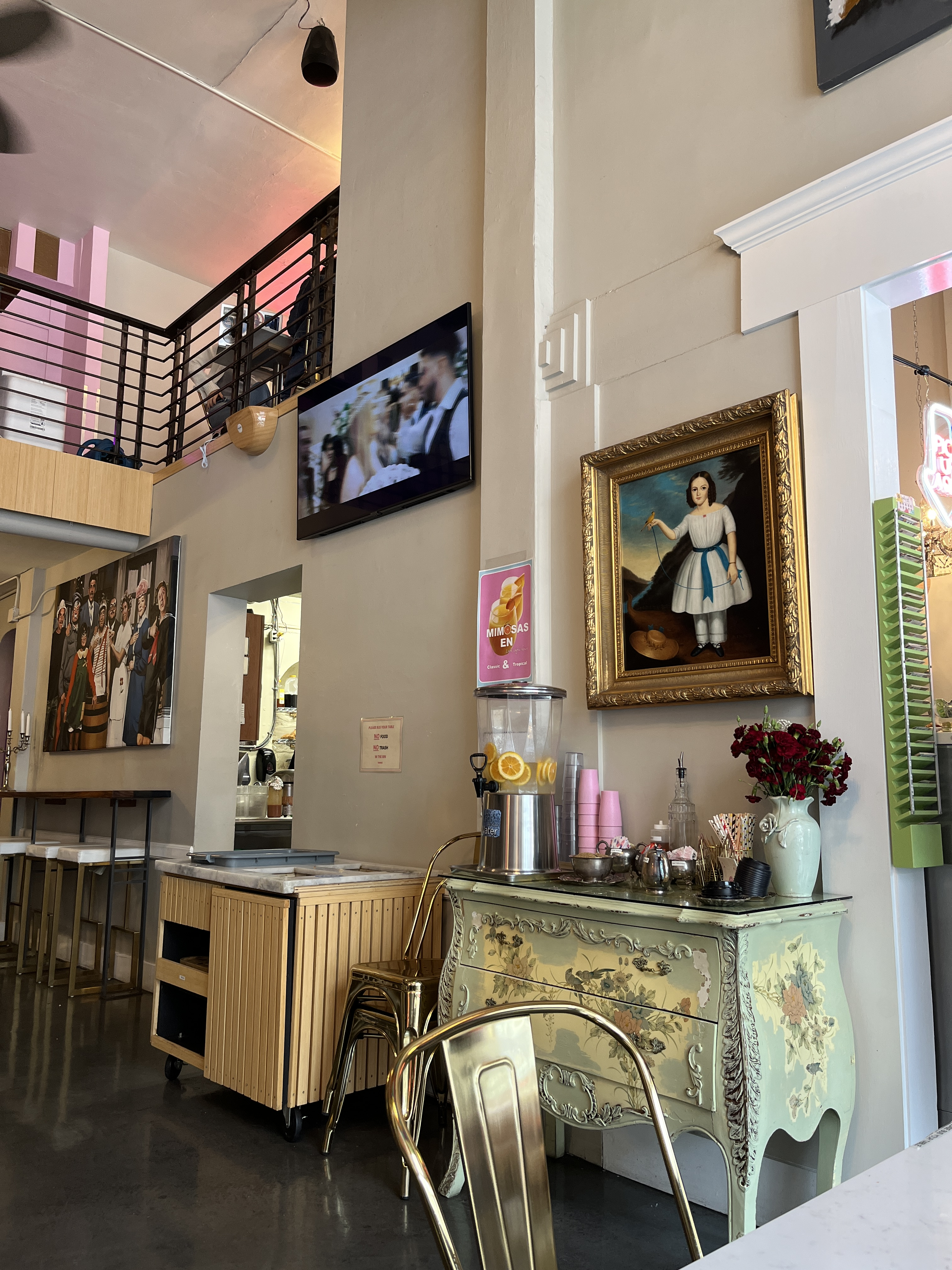
- The restaurant's interior, 2024
- Interactive map of Leon Coffee House

Restaurant information
- Established: 2021
- Owner: Lupe Chavez
- Food type: Mexican
- Location: 1309 Northeast 45th Street, Seattle, King, Washington, 98105, United States
- Coordinates: 47.6612°N 122.3139°W
- Website: leoncoffeehouse.com

Leon Coffee House is a coffee shop in Seattle's University District, in the U.S. state of Washington. Established in 2021, the family-owned business is among the city's only Mexican coffee shops and has a colorful interior with various backdrops and decorations. The menu includes coffee and espresso drinks, horchata and other varieties of lattes, as well as churros, flan, nachos, pastries, tamales, and waffles, among other food items.

== Description ==
Leon Coffee House is a family-owned Mexican coffee shop next to Neptune Theatre, on Northeast 45th Street, in Seattle's University District. The lower level is used more for dining and the upper level is designed for studying and working. The bright and colorful interior has various backdrops, a life-sized "Barbie box", a crystal chandelier, a floral indoor swing, Frida Kahlo paintings, neon signs, a rainbow staircase, and umbrellas of various colors hanging from the ceiling. According to Eater Seattle, Leon has "a vibe that's both decadent and whimsical".

In addition to coffee and espresso drinks, the menu includes horchata, taro, and velvet lattes, as well as mochas and drinks with matcha. Some of the restaurant's drinks feature latte art depicting animals such as bears, cat, and rabbits, as well as characters like SpongeBob SquarePants. Food options include churros, flan, granola, nachos, pastries, pork tamales, sandwiches, toasts, and waffles. Leon has a station with watermelon mint water for patrons.

== History ==
Owner Lupe Chavez opened Leon in late October or November 2021. The business is among Seattle's only Mexican coffee shops.

In 2022, Leon participated in the U District Partnership's first annual Cherry Blossom Festival, serving cherry-filled croissants, cherry-flavored Italian soda, and a cherry mocha with latte art. Leon offered drink specials for the same event in 2023. In 2024, the business was featured on the PBS series The Nosh with Rachel Belle (episode "When Food Is Art").

== Reception ==
In 2023, Piper Davidson of The Daily of the University of Washington gave Leon ratings of 2.5 for "study-ability", 2.75 for affordability, 4.0 for quality, and 3.1 overall, each on a scale of 5.0. Davidson called the restaurant "vibrant" and "any millennial Instagram influencer's fantasy", opining: "I was charmed by the Leon Coffee House. While it may not be the most studious atmosphere, it is certainly a wonderful place to treat yourself."

Jeffrey Martin of Seattle Refined called Leon "a quintessential Seattle coffee shop — with a twist" and "a wonderland of coffee, food, and Instagram-worthy ambiance". He complimented the atmosphere and the flavored water, and wrote, "This place is seriously incredible. Super friendly staff, great ambiance, plenty of space for any need. For me, this is a must-go-to coffee shop."

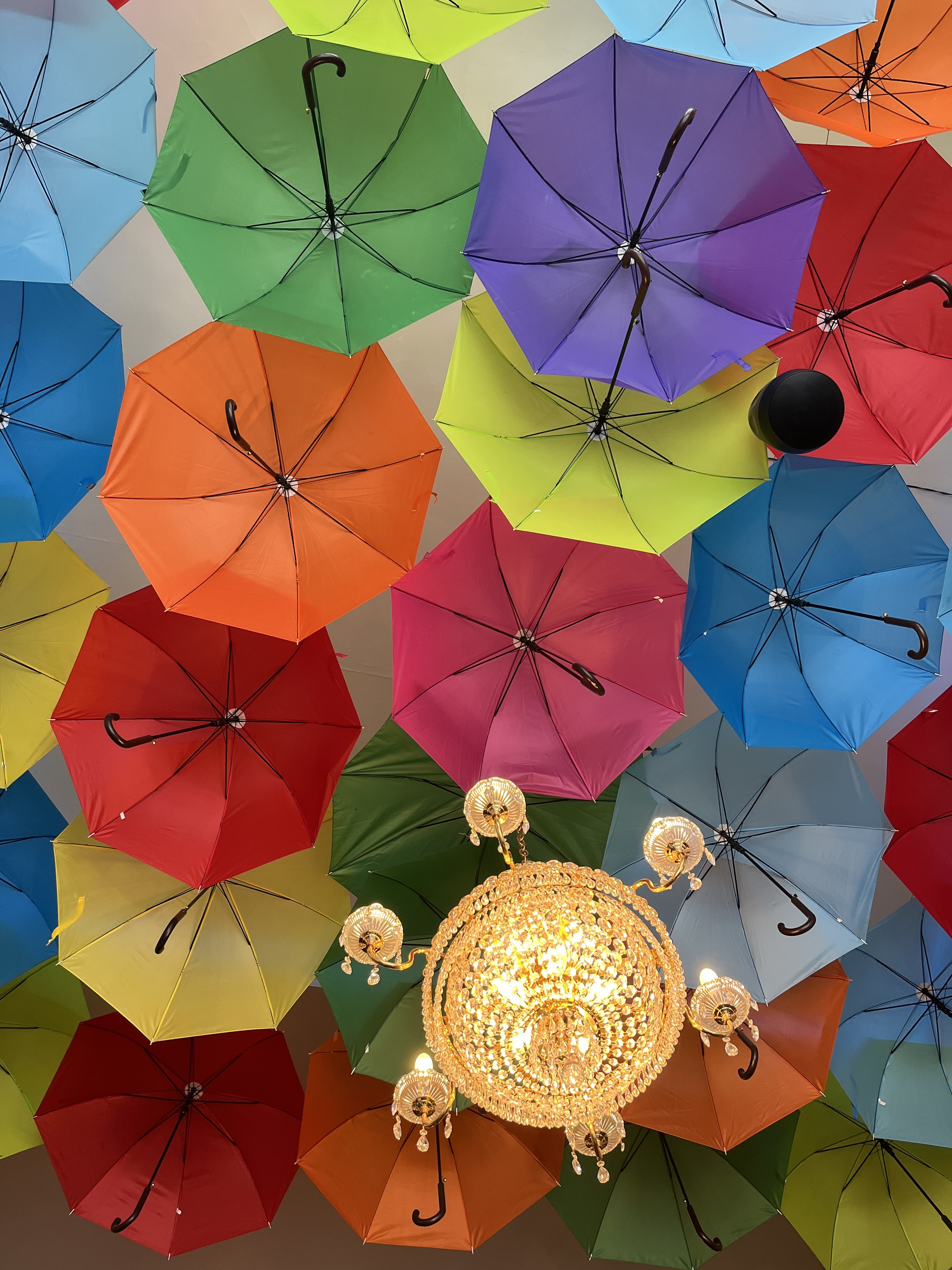
Umbrella ceiling

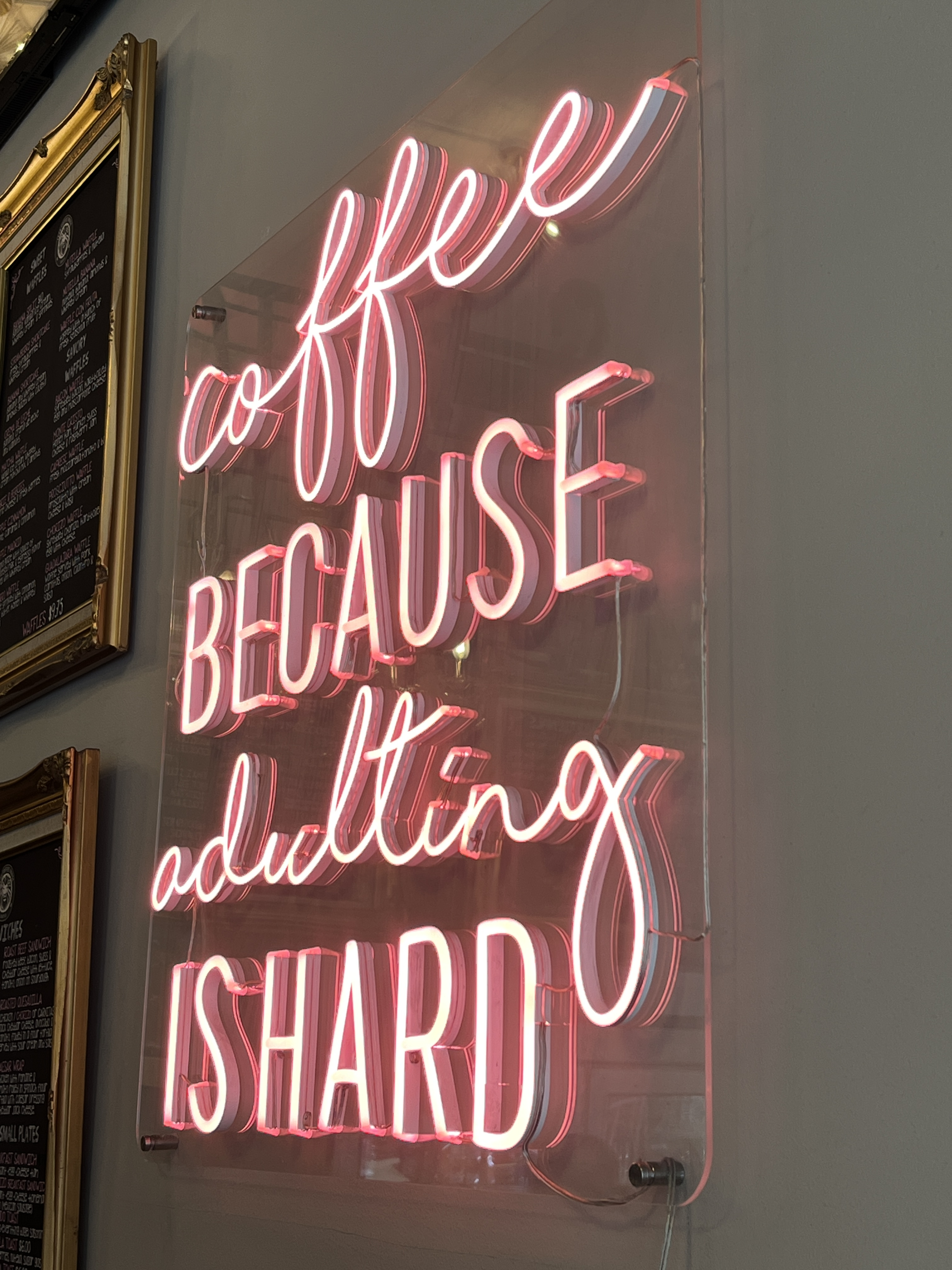
Neon sign

== See also ==
- Coffee in Seattle
- List of Mexican restaurants
