= Michael Stern (real estate developer) =

American real estate developer (born 1979)

- Born: June 13, 1979 (age 46)
- Occupation: real estate developer
- Known for: Founder of JDS Development Group
- Children: 2

Michael Stern (born June 13, 1979) is an American real estate developer.

== Early life ==
Stern was born on June 13, 1979, to a Jewish family and raised in Five Towns on Long Island. He is a graduate of Lawrence High School.

== Career ==
After school, he took a job as a project manager for a developer in Florida and after three years - with funding from friends and family - he began to build spec homes on the side. This eventually evolved into the building of townhouses, mid-rises and high-rises. In the early 2000s, he returned to New York, where he built low-rise houses in the four boroughs.

In a joint venture with Kevin P. Maloney's Property Markets Group, JDS completed the conversion of the Walker Tower at 212 West 18th Street in Chelsea into condominiums and built the 1,428 foot 111 West 57th Street in Manhattan with non-union labor, unprecedented for large-scale construction in Manhattan. JDS also developed The Copper (originally known as 626 First Avenue), a dual-tower residential skyscraper in the Kips Bay neighborhood of Manhattan in New York City, and the 1,066 foot Brooklyn Tower, which became the tallest structure in New York City outside Manhattan.

He was named to the 40 Under 40: Class of 2015 by Crain's New York.

== Personal life ==
Stern is divorced and has two children.
