= Echo Brickell =

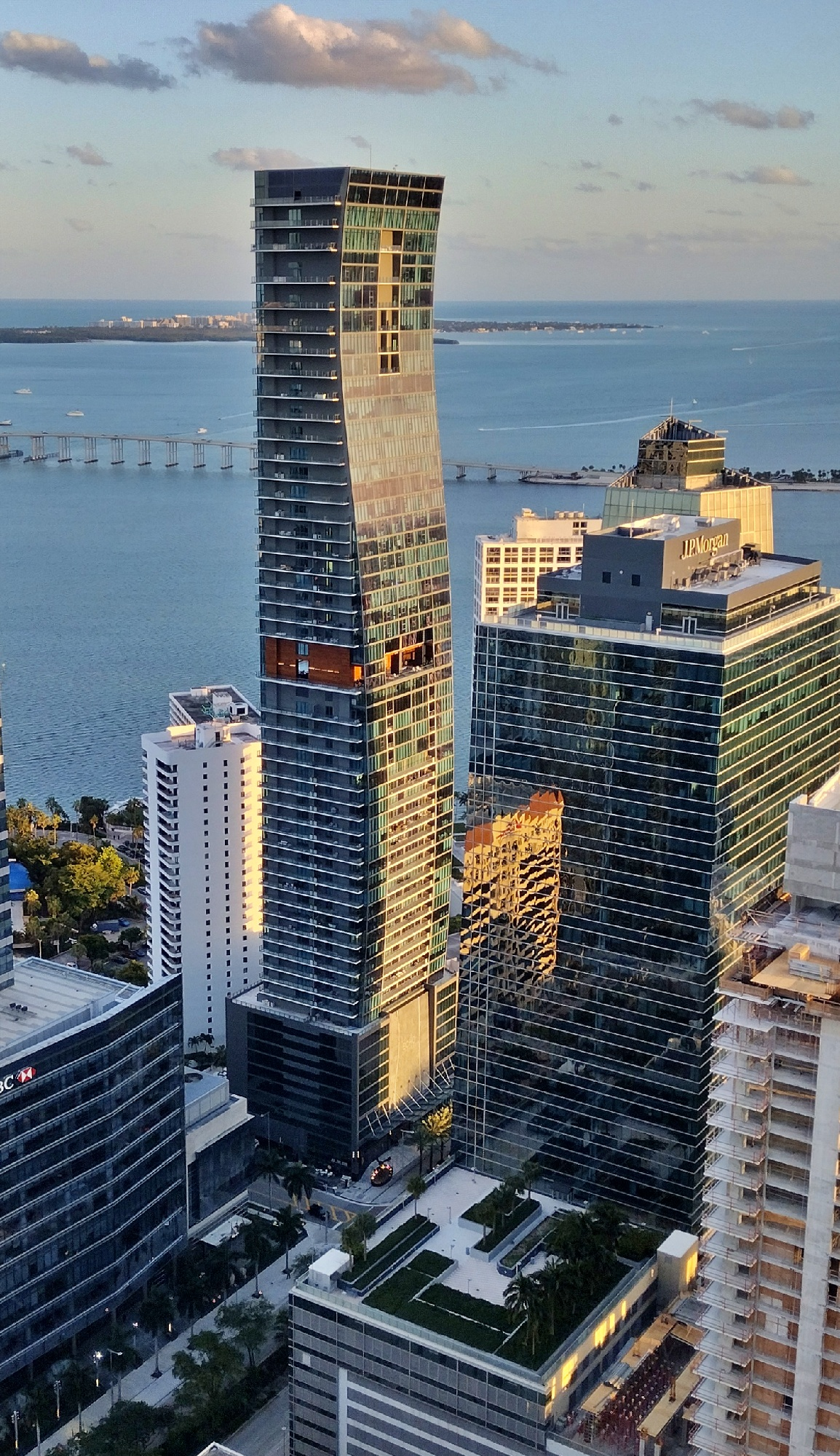
- Echo Brickell in 2024
- Interactive map of the Echo Brickell area

General information
- Status: Completed
- Type: Condo
- Location: 1451 Brickell Avenue, Miami, Florida, United States
- Coordinates: 25°45′29.5″N 80°11′32.5″W
- Construction started: October 2014
- Completed: 2017

Height
- Roof: 635 ft (194 m)

Technical details
- Floor count: 57

Design and construction
- Developer: Property Markets Group

Echo Brickell is a skyscraper in the Brickell district of Downtown Miami, Florida, United States. It was developed by Kevin P. Maloney's Property Markets Group.

== Incidents ==
On October 19, 2016, one person was killed and several others were injured after a construction accident in which a scaffold fell from the top of the building. Another scaffolding collapse took place at the construction site of Hyde Resort & Residences in Hollywood, Florida, also under lead contractor John Moriarty & Associates.
