= Katherine Cole =

American wine writer and journalist

- Education: Harvard College
- Occupations: Wine writer; Journalist; Podcaster
- Children: 2

Katherine Cole is an American wine writer and journalist based in Oregon. She is a contributing editor at SevenFifty Daily and the executive producer and the host of a James Beard-award-winning food and beverage podcast, The Four Top. She is the author of four books on wine: Rosé All Day, Voodoo Vintners, a book on biodynamic winegrowing, Complete Wine Selector: How to Choose the Right Wine Every Time, and How to Fake Your Way Through a Wine List. Cole states that she wants wine drinking to be "accessible to everyone."

== Career ==
Cole was the wine columnist for The Oregonian between 2002 and 2015. Her work can also be found in Wine Spectator, wine-searcher.com, The World of Fine Wine, Wine & Spirits, and other national and international magazines and websites. She has studied with the International Sommelier Guild and has taught journalism classes at Portland State University.

Katherine Cole is also the creator of a smartphone app, called "Oregon Wine, the App." The app features more than 150 Oregon wineries, with descriptions, photographs, and directions to each. Cole was named one of the year's 75 most influential "people, places and flavors that will shape the way you drink in 2014," in the January/February 2014 issue of Imbibe magazine. She also appeared in the 2014 documentary "American Wine Story."

== Books ==
Cole is the author of four books. Voodoo Vintners, published in 2011, reveals the mysteries of biodynamic winegrowing, and the Oregon winemakers behind this revolution. She first became interested in the topic after tasting an Oregon Pinot Gris that had been made with biodynamic grapes. Voodoo Vintners explores the history of biodynamic winegrowing and includes a chapter which addresses criticism of the movement. The book was a finalist in the Louis Roederer International Wine Book of the Year, in the International Wine Writers' Awards. In 2013, she published Complete Wine Selector: How to Choose the Right Wine Every Time. In Complete Wine Selector, Cole organizes the wines by "style" rather than by region or variety. She also writes Complete Wine Selector in a "chatty, approachable style. The Wall Street Journal has recommended How to Fake Your Way Through a Wine List for beginner wine drinkers. Rosé All Day: The Essential Guide to Your New Favorite Wine, was published in 2017. According to Cole, she started working on the book when she noticed that: “quality rosé sales were up 60% while the rest of the table wine market was growing at less than 5% in the United States.

== Personal life ==
Cole is 47 and divorced. She holds degrees from Harvard College and the Columbia University Graduate School of Journalism. She lives in Portland, Oregon with her two daughters.
