= The Racist Sandwich =

American culinary podcast

Racist Sandwich
- Genre: Food; interview
- Language: English

Cast and voices
- Hosted by: Soleil Ho; Zahir Janmohammed

Music
- Theme music composed by: AF the Naysayer
- Opening theme: "Imagerial Denoument (Instrumental)"

Production
- Production: Stephanie Kuo; Juan Diego Ramirez; Alan Montecillo

Publication
- No. of seasons: 2
- No. of episodes: 48
- Original release: May 2016
- Updates: Bi-weekly (Wednesday)

Related
- Website: www.racistsandwich.com

Racist Sandwich is an American food podcast hosted by Stephanie Kuo and Juan Diego Ramírez. The podcast was originally hosted by San Francisco Chronicle Food Critic Soleil Ho and journalist Zahir Janmohamed. The podcast focuses on race, gender and class within the food industry in the United States and abroad. The podcast debuted in May 2016 and airs bi-weekly on Wednesday. The podcast was nominated for a 2019 James Beard Foundation Broadcast Media Award.

== History ==
Zahir Janmohamed and Soleil Ho first met at a party in Portland, Oregon, where they discussed racism and sexism in the Portland restaurant industry. Janmohamed suggested that they start a podcast to discuss these issues for a wider audience. They named the podcast The Racist Sandwich after a local Portland school principal was incorrectly accused of labeling peanut butter and jelly sandwiches as racist.

In 2017, the podcast launched a Kickstarter campaign to finance their second season. The podcast also compiled a list of all Portland restaurants owned by non-white restaurateurs to make it easier for diners to find minority-owned restaurants.

In February 2019, Zahir and Soleil announced they would step down as hosts of the podcast. The podcast relaunched in October 2019 with Stephanie Kuo and Juan Diego Ramírez as the new hosts.

In March 2019, the podcast was nominated for a James Beard Foundation Broadcast Media Award. Racist Sandwich producer Stephanie Kuo produced the nominated episode, titled "Erasing Black Barbecue."

== Format ==
The first season of Racist Sandwich focuses mainly on Portland, while the second and third seasons focus more on the Midwestern United States and the rest of the country.

A typical episode of Racist Sandwich consists of an interview about food or the food industry with a culinary or cultural figure. In addition to interviews, the podcast also has special bonus episodes called "Bonus Topics" that it releases in response to current news involving the food industry and a bi-weekly newsletter called The Word Salad. Individual episodes can vary in length from 15 minutes to more than one hour.

== Guests ==
Racist Sandwich has hosted a variety of guests, including cooks like chef Samin Nosrat and baker Ruby Tandoh of The Great British Bake Off. The podcast has featured writers like novelist Viet Thanh Nguyen, Liana Aghajanian, Nicole A. Taylor, Alexander Chee, Carmen Maria Machado, poet Hanif Abdurraqib and Omar El Akkad. The show has also hosted figures from the world of entertainment like Hari Kondabolu and Jenny Yang.

== See also ==
- List of food podcasts
