= JDS Development Group =

Real-estate development group

- Type: Private
- Industry: Real estate development
- Founder: Michael Stern
- Headquarters: New York City, United States
- Number of employees: 500
- Website: JDS Homepage

JDS Development is an American real-estate development group headquartered in Manhattan, New York, with an additional presence in Miami and South Florida. The firm was founded by Michael Stern, a native of Long Island.

== History ==
The JDS Development Group was founded in 2002 by Michael Stern. The company was incorporated as a privately held New York City-based acquisition firm and real estate development. It specializes in luxury housing, leisure and mixed-use developments, it has over 7 million square feet of real estate under construction.

In 2018, Madison Realty Capital gave a construction loan of $137 million to the JDS Development Group for Monad Terrace Condominium located in Miami, Florida.

== Developments ==
JDS has created buildings in South Florida, as well as Manhattan and Brooklyn in New York City. Notable developments include The Steinway Tower, The Brooklyn Tower, and the American Copper Buildings.
