= The Beerists Podcast =

Beer review podcast

The Beerists Podcast is a craft beer podcast from Austin, Texas. Every episode, the hosts taste and review a panel of craft beers, ending each episode with an individual recommendation of each beer. Some episodes include guest tasters. The podcast launched in May 2012, and the original cast included John Rubio, Anastacia Kelly, Grant Davis, and Mike Lambert. In 2016, The Beerists Podcast won in the category of Arts for the People's Choice Podcast Awards. Today's cast includes John Rubio, Grant Davis, Mark Raup, and Pam Catoe.

== Hosts ==
John Rubio is the host and show runner of The Beerists Podcast. A professional Graphic Designer, he began his journey into craft beer in 1994 when he left home to attend university in central Texas. He currently works with several breweries on branding and design.

Grant Davis was a beer novice when started his tenure with The Beerists Podcast. Grant hosts and appears on a multitude of other podcasts, like The TV Dudes and Star Trek Discovery Pod, and co-runs a podcast recording studio in Austin, TX.

Mark Raup has been a longtime friend of the Beerists Podcast, appearing often as a guest in the early years of the show. He started his full-time Beerist career on episode 528 "Reboot" published May 22, 2022. The hate came too.

Pam Catoe joined the cast on May 22, 2022 with episode 528 "Reboot" alongside Mark Raup. She is the owner of CraftbeerAustin.com and is the SW Regional editor for PorchDrinking.com.

Mike Lambert was a Beerist from episode 3, published in 2012 through episode 527, published May 1, 2022. Mike organized a monthly beer tasting in Austin for over 10 years, and worked at a brewery in Austin, TX before leaving the show to follow his heart to Iowa.

Laura Christie was a show host from July 2019 to August 2020. She is a certified cicerone and beer educator. Her first last episode with The Beerists Podcast premiered August 16, 2020.

Anastacia Kelly was a show host from 2012-2019. She has been involved with the subject of craft beer for over a decade and has worked as a beer buyer, a brewpub bartender, and a brewery sensory analyst. Her last episode with The Beerists Podcast was recorded on July 1, 2019.

== Rating System ==
At the end of every episode the Beerists give their individual recommendations for whether they think a beer is a buy, a try, a sigh, or a die. They also have the opportunity to nominate any beer featured on that episode for a Best of the Beerists award. It is then put to a vote, and a beer that has the majority is presented with an award.
