= Kevin P. Maloney =

- Born: December 5, 1958 (age 67)
- Education: B.A. University at Buffalo
- Occupation: Real Estate Developer
- Known for: Founder of Property Markets Group
- Spouse: Tanya Babic Maloney
- Children: Three

Kevin P. Maloney (born December 5, 1958) is an American real estate developer and founder of Property Markets Group.

== Biography ==
The son of a lawyer in the United States Marine Corps Maloney was raised on a farm. He graduated from University at Buffalo where he used his student loans to purchase several properties. After college, he worked for Chemical Bank in New York City and then Ensign Bank where he was responsible for their real estate unit. In 1991, he founded Property Markets Group which specializes in residential projects in New York, South Florida and Chicago. In 1994, Gary Barnett (who would later found Extell Development Company) and Ziel Feldman (who later founded HFZ Capital Group) joined him as principals of the firm.

Maloney has developed or is developing a number of prominent buildings including the 60 story, 750 foot Echo Brickell in Miami, the $160 million condominium project, Echo Aventura, in Aventura, Florida, and two projects being co-developed with Michael Stern, the 1,428 foot 111 West 57th Street in Manhattan, and the Walker Tower at 212 West 18th Street in Chelsea which they are converting into condominiums.

PMG typically partners with other firms who are having some difficulty closing a project and need additional capital or expertise. PMG does not hold onto real estate as a long term investment; instead they sell it to either a third party or a real estate investment trust typically after it has been mostly leased or sold out as condominiums.

== Personal life ==
Maloney lives in Manhattan and Miami. He is married to Tania Babic, from London, with whom he has three children. He also has two adopted children from a previous relationship.
