= Bianca Bosker =

American journalist and author

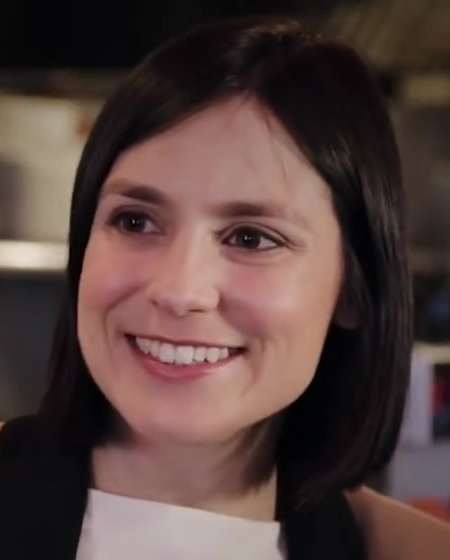
- Bianca Bosker in 2017
- Born: Portland, Oregon, U.S.
- Education: Princeton University
- Occupation: Writer
- Spouse: Matthew Nguyen
- Website: biancabosker.com

Bianca Bosker is an American journalist and bestselling author. Her nonfiction books Cork Dork and Get the Picture were New York Times bestsellers. She is a contributing writer for The Atlantic. Her work has also appeared in publications including The Wall Street Journal, Fast Company, Food & Wine, The New York Times, Far Eastern Economic Review, and The Oregonian.

Bosker is the author of Original Copies: Architectural Mimicry in Contemporary China and Get the Picture: A Mind-Bending Journey among the Inspired Artists and Obsessive Art Fiends Who Taught Me How to See. She is an alumna of Princeton University, and co-founder of the Huffington Post Technology section.
