= Rachel Belle =

Seattle radio personality

- Occupation: Radio personality

Rachel Belle is a Seattle radio personality. She is originally from Pleasanton, California and attended California State University, Chico.

Her podcast Your Last Meal, begun in 2016, was nominated for a James Beard Award in 2018. The podcast also reached iTunes' top position for food podcasts c. 2018. During the COVID-19 pandemic, she began a social media-based virtual cooking club.

Belle received the 2018 Edward R. Murrow Award for Feature Reporting for her story on the homeless Girl Scout troop at Mary's Place, a Seattle women's shelter.

In 2024, Belle's television program The Nosh with Rachel Belle began on Cascade PBS.
