= View 34 =

Residential skyscraper in Manhattan, New York

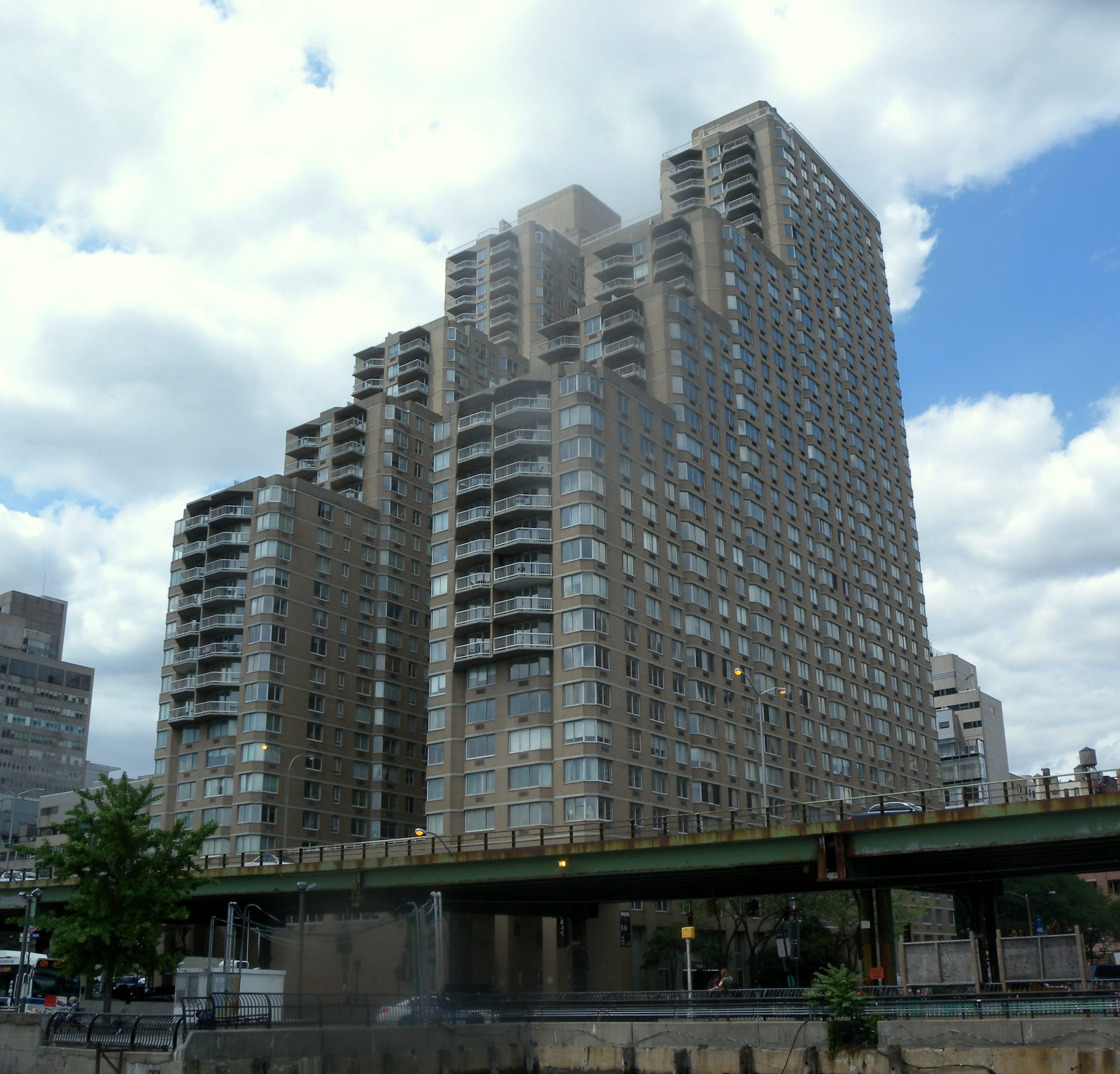
- Looking west at the building in 2011
- Former names: Rivergate

General information
- Status: Completed
- Location: 401 East 34th Street, New York City, United States
- Coordinates: 40°44′38″N 73°58′21″W
- Groundbreaking: March 7, 1983
- Opened: 1985
- Cost: US$30,000,000
- Owner: UDR, Inc.

Height
- Height: 362 ft (110 m)

Technical details
- Floor count: 35

Design and construction
- Architects: Samuel Braverman, Costas Kondylis
- Architecture firm: Philip Birnbaum & Associates
- Developer: Donald Zucker
- Structural engineer: Rosenwasser/Grossman Consulting Engineers P.C.

Other information
- Number of units: 740
- Parking: 80 spaces

View 34 (formerly known as Rivergate) is a 35-story apartment building in the Murray Hill neighborhood of Manhattan in New York City. Occupying the full block bounded by First Avenue, FDR Drive, East 34th Street and East 35th Street, the high-rise was constructed on the former site of a Coca-Cola bottling plant and sparked the redevelopment of the eastern part of Murray Hill from industrial to residential uses beginning in the 1980s.

== History ==
In 1978, developer Donald Zucker entered into an agreement with the Coca-Cola Bottling Company of New York, Inc. to purchase its bottling plant located at 425 East 34th Street for $6 million and redevelop the site with a high-rise containing 800 residential units. He retained architect Paul Rudolph to design a residential and commercial rental property on the site. Although the building would require a change in zoning from manufacturing to residential use, Zucker had hoped to begin construction on the project in the spring of 1980. However, the sale of the bottling plant would not occur until July 1980 because of delays associated with Coca-Cola getting a clear title to the property; a covenant in the land deeded from the city in 1847 required the title holder to maintain the streets around the property. On February 21, 1980, the New York City Board of Estimate voted to grant a waiver to Coca-Cola from the provision with a payment of $175,000 for back street repairs under the condition that the company relocate to a former Canada Dry plant in Maspeth, Queens, keeping the jobs in the city.

Zucker originally planned to construct a 42-story residential tower on the block, and allocated part of the site for a playground to appease the local community and to obtain a zoning bonus allowing for additional floor area from privately owned public space. An environmental impact statement for the proposed project was completed in May 1981. The project was initially opposed by Manhattan Community Board 6 and the New York City Planning Commission, which questioned if the building's proposed density would fit in adjacent to an interchange on the FDR Drive and the Kips Bay Generating Station, but negotiations led to the developer agreeing to reduce the size of the project by 20 percent and modify the design of the structure facing the East River. A park was also included on the First Avenue side of the building to upgrade public space in Community District 6, which had the fewest parks compared to other community districts in the borough.

A groundbreaking ceremony was held on March 7, 1983, and attended by several city officials including Mayor Ed Koch, Comptroller Harrison J. Goldin and Borough President Andrew Stein. Originally named Rivergate, the $30 million project was designed by Samuel Braverman and Costas Kondylis of Philip Birnbaum & Associates and planned to include 700 rental units consisting of one- and two-bedroom apartments. The building was completed at the beginning of 1985. By March of that year, one hundred tenants had moved in and another hundred had signed leases.

The original design for the 23,700-square-foot (2,200 m^{2}) public plaza on the west side of the site was made by Thomas Balsley Associates. A unique feature of the plaza was a 102-by-52-foot (31 m × 16 m) ice skating rink. Rivergate Ice Rink opened in December 1985 and was the first outdoor rink to be constructed in Manhattan since 1966 when Lasker Rink opened in Central Park. While the small size of Rivergate Ice Rink drew comparisons to the Rockefeller Center ice rink, it wasn't crowded with tourists like the one at Rockefeller Center or Wollman Rink in Central Park. The plaza's outdoor ice rink was popular among local residents and families; it included a warming hut for skaters that served hot chocolate. The northern side of the plaza included a basketball court and a children's playground. The ice rink was subsequently removed in 1996 in a redesign of the plaza by Landgarden Landscape Architects and converted into a passive recreation area with a lawn surrounded by a brick track with trees and shrubs around the perimeter.

In July 2011, Rivergate was sold by the Zucker Organization to UDR, Inc. for $443 million. The new owner began renovating the apartment complex the following year and subsequently changed the name of the building to View 34. As part of the building renovations, the total number of residential units was increased from 706 to 740 by internal subdivisions of one-bedroom apartments into studio apartments.

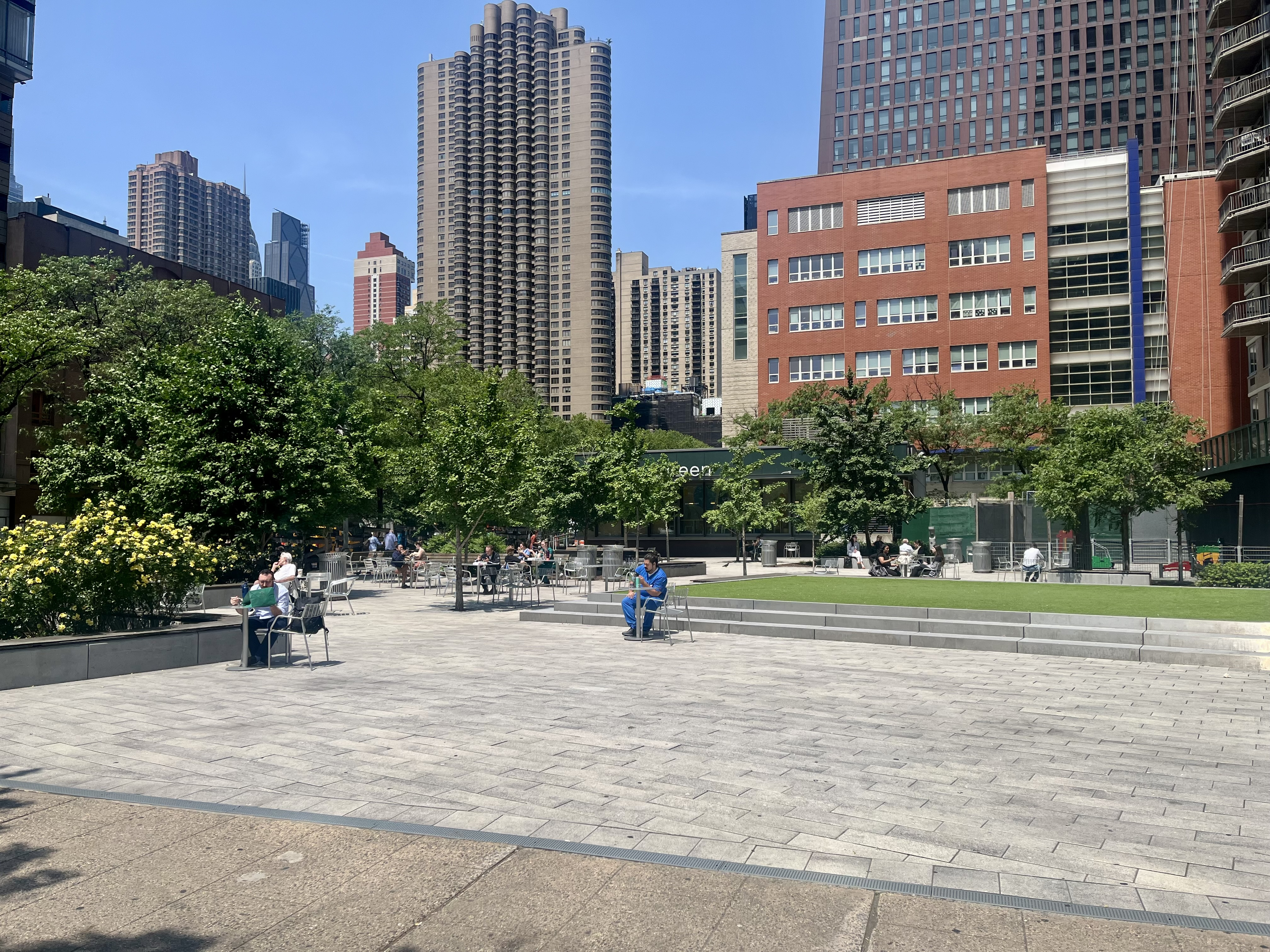
The building's public plaza in 2025, with The Corinthian, P.S. 281, and The Copper in the background

In 2014, the building owner filed an application to construct a 4,000-square-foot (370 m^{2}) retail building at the northwest corner of the public plaza. As originally constructed, the size of the plaza had exceeded its required area, which allowed some of the public space to be converted to private use. The proposed plans also involved modifications to other parts of the plaza, including the addition of a dog run, a turf area on a platform and additional seating areas. Discussions with the City Planning Commission and Community Board 6 led the developer to decrease the footprint of the new retail area to reduce the loss of public open space. (Note: The public plaza has also been referred to as Joseph Slifka Park, named after real estate developer Joseph J. Slifka (1900–1992). The development of Rivergate by Zucker was made in partnership with Slifka.) The new retail building and public plaza were designed by MuCh Architecture in collaboration with SiteWorks and include a 3,000-square-foot (280 m^{2}) restaurant, outdoor seating areas with an elevated turf lawn, a children's playground, a basketball court and a 5-by-3-by-6-foot (155 cm × 100 cm × 180 cm) mirror polished stainless steel sculpture by David Fried titled Stemmer.

== Design ==
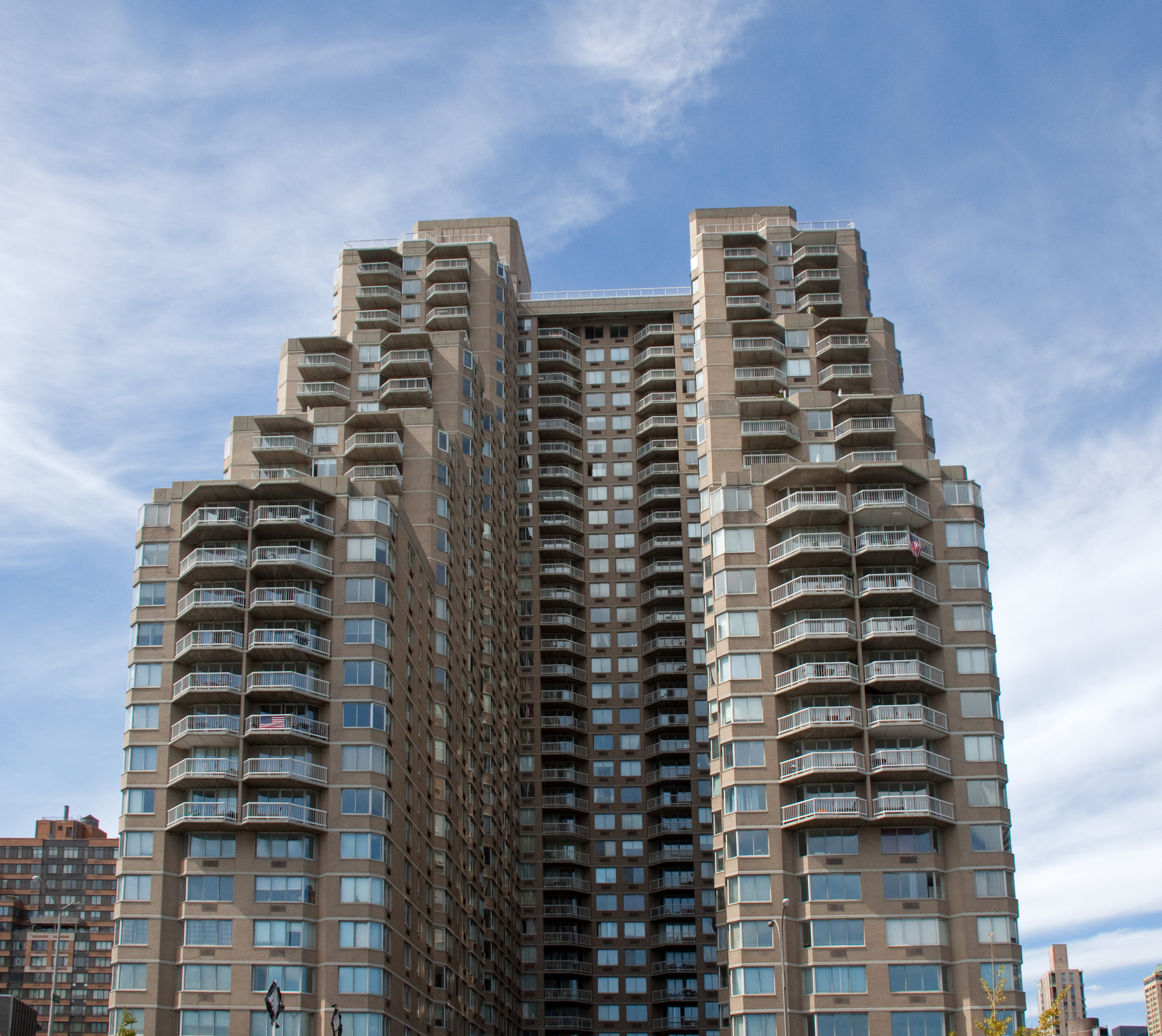
The U-shaped building has a courtyard facing the East River.

The building forms a U-shape with a narrow courtyard facing the East River and has a step design with three deep setbacks on the east side of the structure that form roof terraces for some of the apartments facing the river. It has a 6,000-square-foot (560 m^{2}), three-story glass atrium lobby designed by architect David Kenneth Specter that includes an indoor garden, waterfalls and a 32-by-8-foot (9.8 m × 2.4 m) painting by Frank Stella titled Damascus Gate Variation I. Other building amenities include a health club and roof deck. The windows of apartments in the building contain insulated glazing to reduce interior noise given the building's location adjacent to the FDR Drive and near the East 34th Street Heliport.

== Reception and impact ==
Robert A. M. Stern and the co-authors of his 2006 book New York 2000 described Rivergate as a "banal multibalconied, brown brick-clad mass," although they also wrote that the public plaza was "a happy contribution to the developing neighborhood."

The Rivergate project sparked the redevelopment of the eastern part of Murray Hill from industrial to residential uses; after the site's zoning was changed from manufacturing to residential, the City Planning Commission rezoned other sites in the area to allow for high-density residential development. The rezoning of other sites along First Avenue to the north of Rivergate led to the development of additional residential high-rises in the 1980s including Manhattan Place, the Horizon, and The Corinthian. In 2008, the city approved the rezoning of four former Consolidated Edison properties along First Avenue, including the former sites of the Waterside Generating Station and Kips Bay Generating Station, the latter of which was located across from Rivergate on the east side of First Avenue between East 35th and 36th streets. The block that formerly contained the Kips Bay Generating Station was redeveloped with an elementary school that opened in 2013 (P.S. 281 – The River School) and a pair of residential skyscrapers, American Copper Buildings, that were completed in 2017 and 2018.
