= United Nations Secretariat Building =

Skyscraper in Manhattan, New York

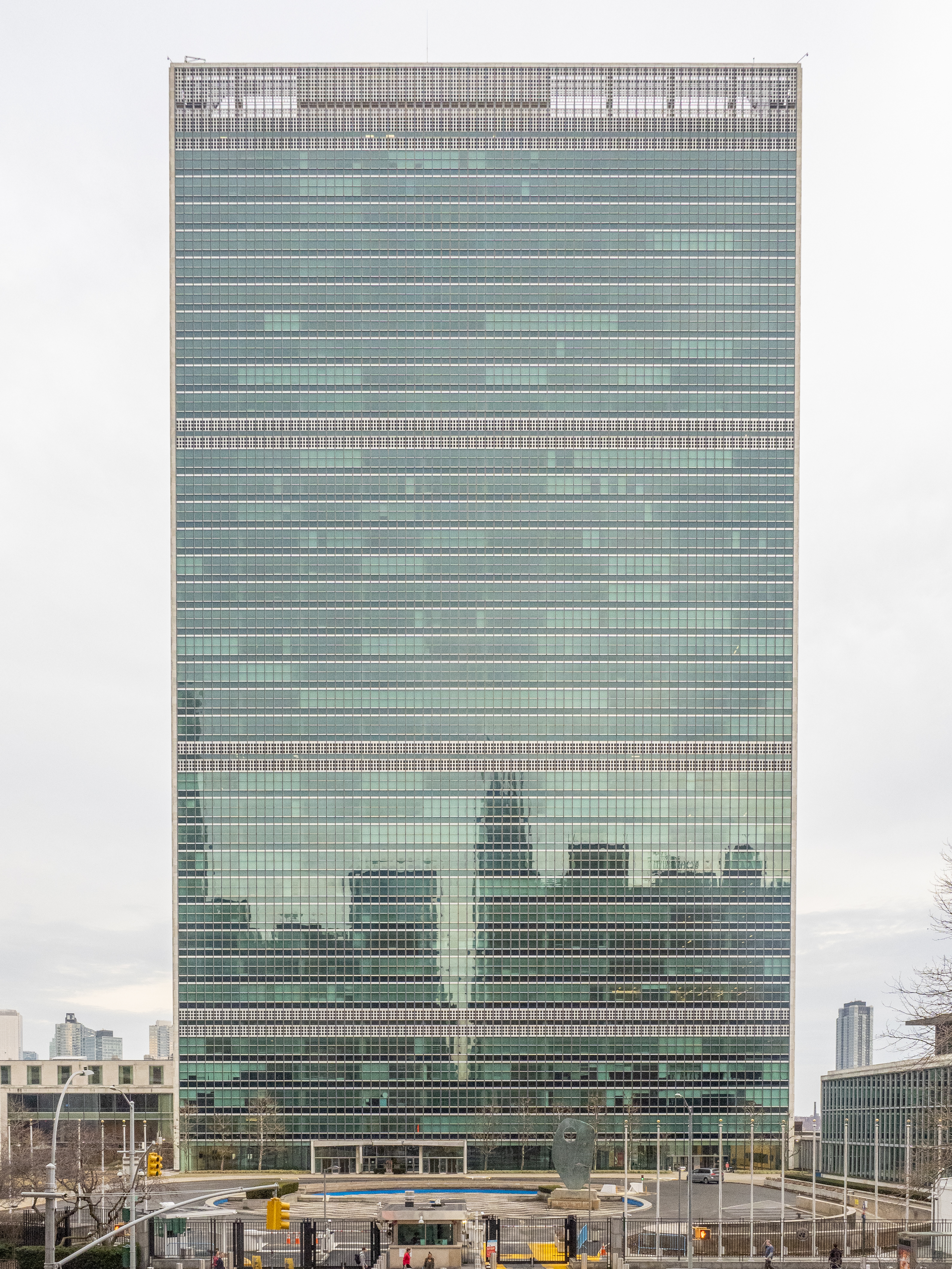
- The United Nations Secretariat Building in New York City
- Interactive map of the United Nations Secretariat Building area

General information
- Status: Completed
- Type: Office
- Architectural style: International Style
- Location: International territory in Manhattan, New York City
- Coordinates: 40°44′56″N 73°58′05″W
- Construction started: September 14, 1948
- Completed: June 1951
- Opening: August 21, 1950
- Owner: United Nations

Height
- Roof: 505 ft (154 m)

Technical details
- Floor count: 39

Design and construction
- Architects: United Nations Headquarters Board of Design (Wallace Harrison, Oscar Niemeyer, Le Corbusier, etc.)
- Main contractor: George A. Fuller Company; Turner Construction; Walsh Construction Company; Slattery Contracting Company

The United Nations Secretariat Building is a skyscraper at the headquarters of the United Nations in the Turtle Bay neighborhood of Manhattan in New York City. It contains the offices of the United Nations Secretariat, the executive organ of the United Nations (UN). The building, designed in the International Style, is 505 ft (154 m) tall with 39 above-ground stories. It was designed by a group of architects led by Wallace Harrison. Although the building is located within the United States, the site is under UN jurisdiction, so the building is exempt from some local regulations.

The Secretariat Building is designed as a rectangular slab measuring 72 by 287 ft (22 by 87 m); it is oriented from north to south and is connected with other UN headquarters buildings. The wider western and eastern elevations of the facade are glass curtain walls, while the narrower northern and southern elevations are made of marble. The Secretariat Building has 889,000 ft^{2} (82,600 m^{2}) of space. There are press offices, staff rooms, and other functions on the lower stories. The Secretariat offices are placed on the upper stories, which were originally arranged in a modular layout. The building also features various pieces of artwork. The building's style has inspired the construction of other glass curtain wall buildings in Manhattan.

The design process for the United Nations headquarters formally began in February 1947, and a groundbreaking ceremony for the Secretariat Building occurred on September 14, 1948. Staff started moving into the building on August 21, 1950, and it was completed in June 1951. Within a decade, the Secretariat Building was overcrowded, prompting the UN to build additional office space nearby. The building started to deteriorate in the 1980s due to a lack of funding, worsened by the fact that it did not meet modern New York City building codes. UN officials considered renovating the building by the late 1990s, but the project was deferred for several years. The Secretariat Building was renovated starting in 2010 and reopened in phases from July to December 2012.

== Site ==
The Secretariat Building is part of the headquarters of the United Nations in the Turtle Bay neighborhood of Manhattan in New York City. It occupies a land lot bounded by First Avenue to the west, 42nd Street to the south, the East River to the east, and 48th Street to the north. Although it is physically within the United States, the underlying land is under the jurisdiction of the United Nations (UN). The site is technically extraterritorial through a treaty agreement with the US government, though it is not a territory governed by the UN. Most local, state, and federal laws still apply within the UN headquarters. Due to the site's extraterritorial status, the headquarters buildings are not New York City designated landmarks, since such a designation falls under the purview of the New York City Landmarks Preservation Commission.

The Secretariat Building is directly connected to the Conference Building (housing the Security Council) at its northeast and the Dag Hammarskjöld Library to the south. It is indirectly connected to the United Nations General Assembly Building to the north, via the Conference Building. West of the Secretariat Building is a circular pool with a decorative fountain in its center, as well as a sculpture executed in 1964 by British artist Barbara Hepworth in memory of Secretary-General Dag Hammarskjöld. The Japanese Peace Bell is just north of the building, and a grove of sycamore trees is planted next to the Secretariat Building. On the western part of the site, along First Avenue, are the flags of the UN, its member states, and its observer states.

Outside of the UN headquarters, Robert Moses Playground is directly to the south, and Tudor City and the Ford Foundation Center for Social Justice are to the west. In addition, One and Two United Nations Plaza (including the Millennium Hilton New York One UN Plaza hotel) are to the northwest. The building is physically isolated from other nearby structures, with the nearest New York City Subway station being several blocks away. Because of this, the Secretariat Building appears as a freestanding tower.

Historically, the site was part of a cove called Turtle Bay. The cove, located between what is now 45th and 48th Streets, was fed by a stream that ran from the present-day intersection of Second Avenue and 48th Street. A creek from the southern end of modern-day Central Park also drained into Turtle Bay. The first settlement on the site was a tobacco farm built in 1639. The site was developed with residences in the 19th century. Slaughterhouses operated on the eastern side of First Avenue for over a hundred years until the construction of the United Nations headquarters. The UN purchased the site in 1946 under the sole condition that it could never slaughter cattle on the land.

== Architecture ==
The Secretariat Building was designed in the International Style by a team of ten architects working under planning director Wallace K. Harrison. The Board of Design comprised Nikolai Bassov of the Soviet Union; Gaston Brunfaut of Belgium; Ernest Cormier of Canada; Le Corbusier of France; Liang Seu-cheng of China; Sven Markelius of Sweden; Oscar Niemeyer of Brazil; Howard Robertson of the United Kingdom; G. A. Soilleux of Australia; and Julio Vilamajó of Uruguay. Abel Sorenson was the interior designer. In addition, David Fine of United States Steel oversaw the construction of the Secretariat Building. The building houses the administrative functions of the UN, including day-to-day duties such as finance and translation. It contains three basement levels and 39 above-ground stories. When the building was completed, it was cited as measuring 544 ft (166 m) tall, although Emporis and The Skyscraper Center both cite the height as 505 ft (154 m).

=== Form and facade ===
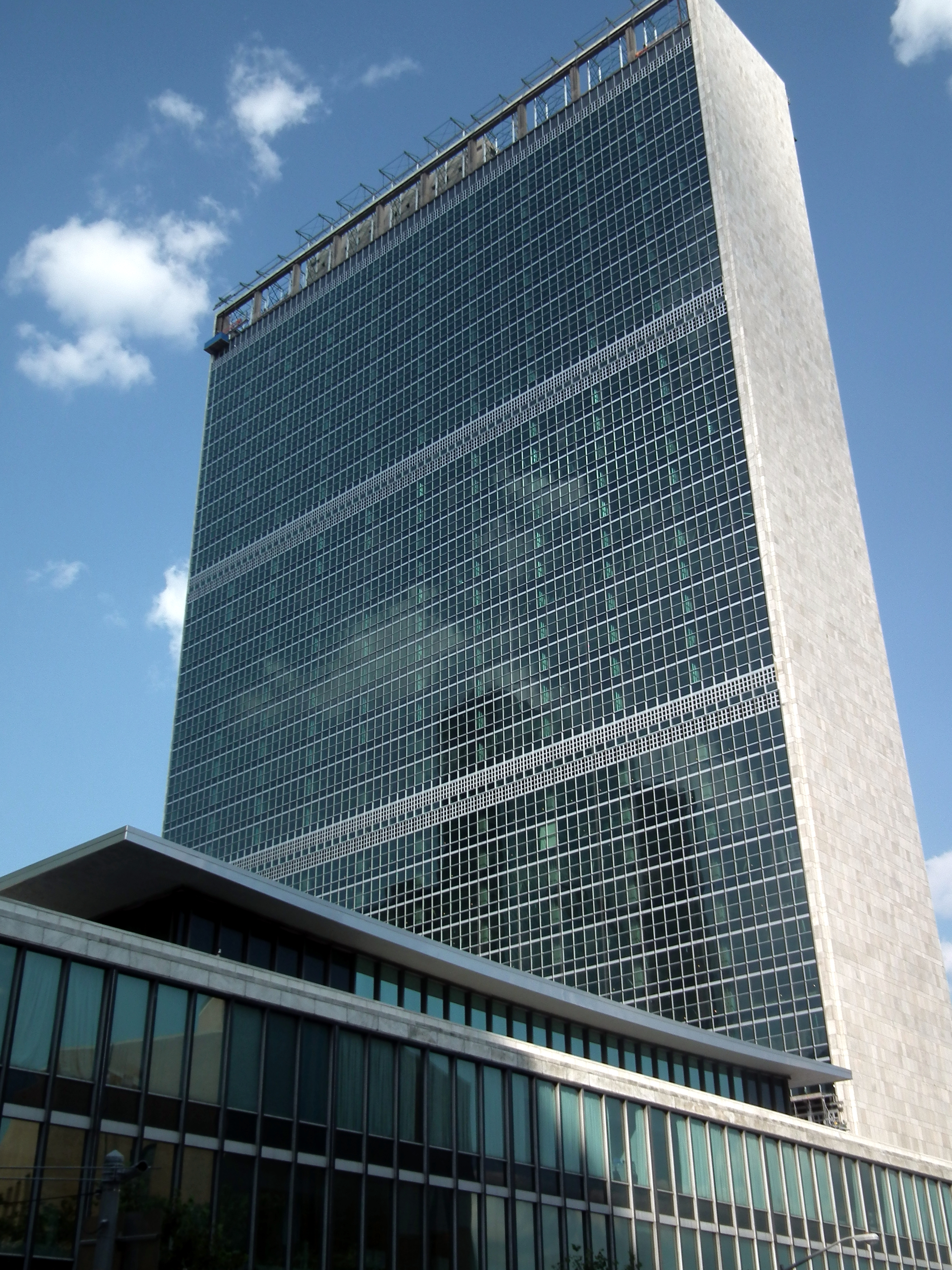
View of the building from the southwest, with the Dag Hammarskjöld Library in the foreground

The building is designed as a rectangular slab measuring 72 by 287 ft (22 by 87 m), (Note: Adlerstein 2015, p. 6, gives alternate measurements of 287 by 74 ft (87 by 23 m).) with the longer axis oriented north–south. The Secretariat's architects wanted to design the massing as a slab without any setbacks. This contrasted with older buildings, such as those at the Rockefeller Center complex, which featured setbacks corresponding to the tops of their elevator banks.

The cornerstone of the UN headquarters was dedicated at the Secretariat Building in 1949. The cornerstone is a block of New Hampshire granite, weighing 3.75 short tons (3.35 long tons; 3.40 t) and measuring 4 by 3 by 3 ft (1.22 by 0.91 by 0.91 m). The name of the United Nations is inscribed in English, Spanish, French, Russian, and Chinese, which at the time were the five official languages of the United Nations. The cornerstone was initially intended to be relocated to the General Assembly Building when that building was completed. UN officials ultimately decided to permanently affix the stone to a high pedestal next to the Secretariat Building.

==== Curtain walls ====
The wider western and eastern elevations of the facade consist of glass curtain walls set within a metal grid. The Secretariat Building was the first skyscraper in New York City to use a glass curtain wall. The western and eastern elevations contain 5,400 windows in total. A total of 300,000 ft^{2} (28,000 m^{2}) of glass was used, a greater proportion than any other structure in the world at the time. The General Bronze Corporation manufactured and supplied the building with 5,400 individual windows, spandrel frames, louvers, and architectural metalwork. The original curtain wall was a single layer of blue-green glass that absorbed heat. The reflective glass was chosen mainly as a means to reduce heat on the western elevation, which absorbed most of the sunlight during a typical workday. The eastern elevation was clad in the same material for aesthetic reasons. General Bronze Corporation manufactured the windows to meet the specifications of Harrison's design: "a curtain wall cantilevered two feet, nine inches, in front of the steel structure so that it formed a flush skin of blue-green Thermopane heat-absorbing glass, painted black on the inner face." The modern facade, installed in 2010, is made of low emissivity glass that resembles the original facade. The modern curtain wall consists of two layers of glass panes, which are more resistant to shattering in case of a bombing.

When the building was completed, the curtain walls were cantilevered 2 ft 9 in (0.84 m) from the superstructure and were attached to the concrete floor slabs. Each of the original windows were aluminum sash windows, separated by aluminum mullions that projected slightly from the facade. The sash windows were compatible with conventional window cleaning equipment. The modern curtain walls are hung from the superstructure via outrigger plates, and there are projecting aluminum mullions similar to those on the original sash windows. The western and eastern elevations are each divided vertically into ten bays, each measuring 28 ft (8.5 m) wide. Within each bay are seven panels, each measuring 4 ft (1.2 m) wide and 12 ft (3.7 m) tall. Three of the old curtain-wall panels are preserved in the Museum of Modern Art.

Spandrel panels separate the windows on different stories. The inner faces of the spandrels are painted black, insulating the building while also giving the impression of depth. The curtain walls initially had weep holes, which were intended to prevent the windows from cracking. Most of the weep holes were plugged in 1952 and 1953 because the building's shape and its susceptibility to high winds frequently caused rainwater to leak into the building. Floors 6, 16, 28, and 39 house mechanical equipment and thus contain pipe galleries rather than glass panels. The facades of these mechanical stories consist of latticed panels, except on floor 39, where there is a mechanical penthouse behind an open-air grille. The architect Henry Stern Churchill wrote that the mechanical penthouse was "a very simple shape and could very well have been left visible".

==== Marble slabs ====
The narrower northern and southern elevations are made of masonry clad with Vermont marble. These elevations rise as unbroken slabs and do not contain any openings. The building's steel superstructure, including steel bracing, was concealed within these marble slabs. According to Harrison, the marble walls not only allowed the Secretariat Building to be seen as a monument, but also reduced competition between staff members who wanted corner offices.

=== Structural features ===
The foundation includes concrete piers that extend down to the underlying bedrock. Steel pilings are used at points where the bedrock is more than 20 ft (6.1 m) deep. The piles are installed in sets of 5 to 20 and range from 50 to 90 ft (15 to 27 m) deep. Each set of pilings is covered by a concrete cap. The building's structural loads are carried by an internal superstructure that includes about 13,000 short tons (12,000 long tons; 12,000 t) of steel. The columns of the superstructure are arranged in a 10×3 grid. The ten north–south bays are all 28 ft (8.5 m) wide, but the three west–east bays are all of different widths. The westernmost bay is 20 ft 8 in (6.30 m) wide; the central bay is 18 ft 2 in (5.54 m) wide; and the easternmost bay is 27 by 8 ft (8.2 by 2.4 m) wide. The narrow central bay was used as an elevator core. The floors are generally made of mesh and reinforced concrete, which is covered by either terrazzo, cement, asphalt-tile, or carpeting. Electrical and air ducts are placed underneath each floor slab. The interior partition walls are made of rough masonry, marble, plaster, glass, aluminum, or pointed steel.

=== Interior ===
The Secretariat Building was constructed with 889,000 ft^{2} (82,600 m^{2}) of space and, at the time of its completion, could accommodate 4,000 workers. Floors 6, 16, and 28 are used as mechanical floors, and floor 39 serves as a mechanical penthouse, accessible only by stairs. In addition, the United Nations headquarters had a pneumatic mail system, with tubes connecting to a central collection point in the Secretariat Building. Objects could be transported between floors via a conveyor belt system that traveled at 100 ft/min (30 m/min). There was also a dumbwaiter that stopped at every floor except for the lobby and the mechanical stories. The pneumatic mail system only served two stories, while the conveyor belt and dumbwaiter systems were primarily used by the building's messenger stations, which occupied only eleven stories. The building is decorated with various pieces of art from the United Nations Art Collection.

The Secretariat Building was built with 21 high-speed passenger elevators and eight bronze-and-glass escalators. The building has two freight elevators serving all stories and three banks of six passenger elevators. The low-rise, mid-rise, and high-rise banks of elevators respectively serve floors 2–15, 16–27, and 28–39. The elevators were programmed so that, if a person on one of the office floors was waiting for a "down" elevator for more than 60 seconds, they would instead be able to enter the next "up" elevator. The elevators were initially staffed by elevator operators before being converted to manual operation in 1967.

==== Lower stories ====
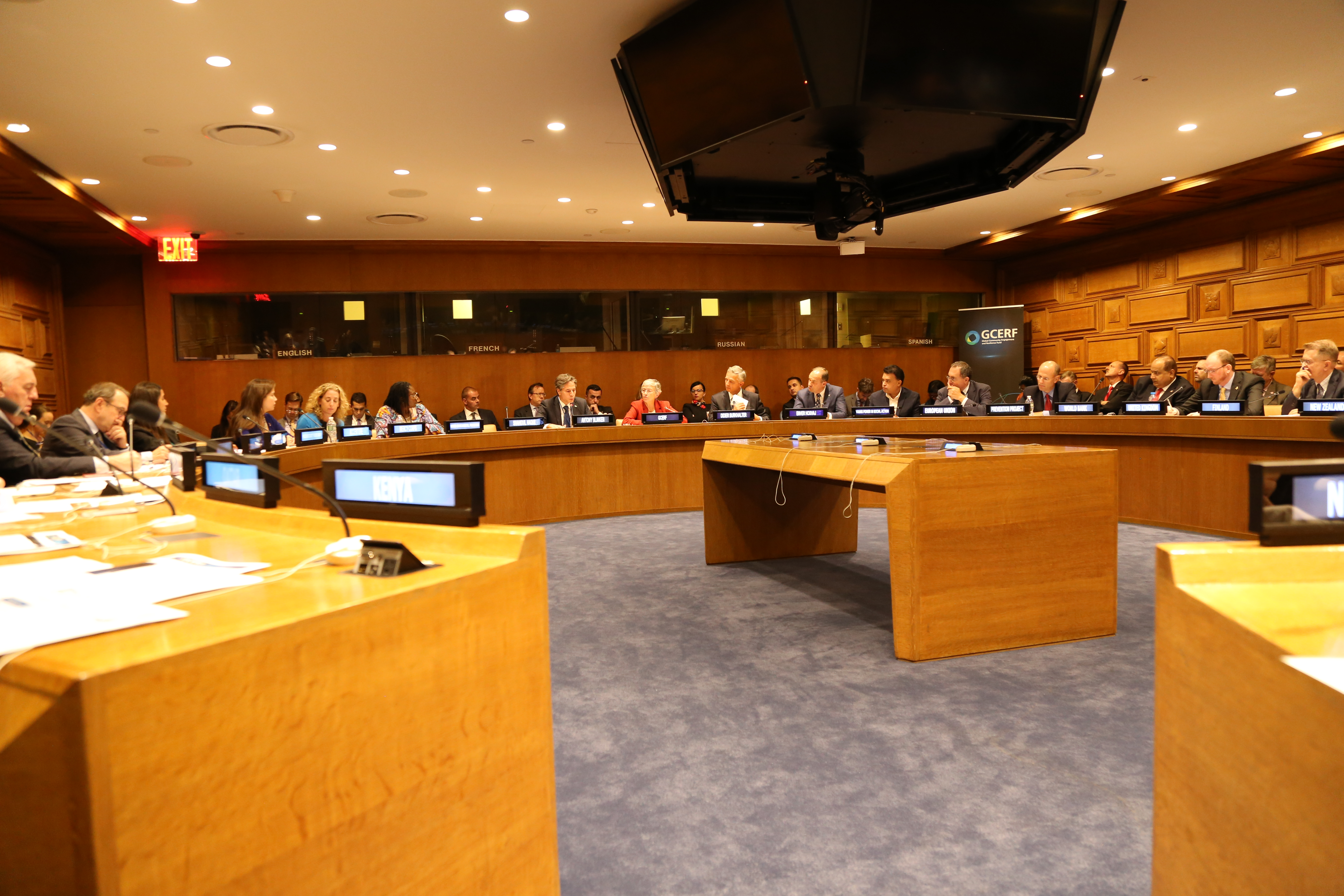
Meeting room within the building

Under the building is a three-story garage for UN employees, with 1,500 parking spaces. The first basement level also houses the UN's post office and a studio for educational films. On the second basement level are lockers for maintenance workers and a room for printing and collating documents. The third basement level includes a small firehouse for the UN headquarters and a furnace room, as well as a document distribution room in the third basement. The radio department of the United Nations Department of Public Information is headquartered on one of the basement levels. Tunnels from the basements lead south to the library and north to the General Assembly Building.

The building's lobby has black-and-white terrazzo floors, as well as columns covered with green Italian marble. Black-and-white terrazzo floors are also present at all entryways, and all corridors in the building near the elevator banks. There are full-height windows within the lobby. Also within the lobby is Peace, a 15 by 12 ft (4.6 by 3.7 m) stained glass window by Marc Chagall, dedicated in memory of Hammarskjöld in 1964. When the building was constructed, the lowest stories were to contain broadcasting studios, press offices, staff rooms, and other functions. Media correspondents for the United Nations occupied floors 2 to 4. There was a meditation space on floor 2 that doubled as a press conference room. In addition, there was a bank branch on floor 4. The fourth and fifth floors were connected by an open stairway.

On floor 5 are employee amenities, including a health clinic and a passageway to a staff dining room above the adjacent Conference Building. The dining room was initially supposed to be an open-air terrace facing the East River, but it was partially enclosed due to pollution from Waterside Generating Station, a nearby power plant. The dining room frequently hosted parties and receptions for UN staff before being converted into offices in 1981. The modern-day dining room, completed in 1982, is a 750-seat space in the headquarters complex's South Annex. Floor 7 had a large telephone switchboard for the UN's Information Office. The switchboard, installed by the New York Telephone Company, was originally designed to accommodate 3,000 lines, though it could be expanded to as many as 8,000 lines. Floor 17 housed an interpreters' lounge and the UN's art and cartography divisions, while floor 20 had an in-house barber shop.

==== Offices ====
The offices were placed on the upper floors. Each office story has a gross floor area of 19,000 ft^{2} (1,800 m^{2}). There were private offices on the perimeter of each floor. Secretarial offices, support staff, and elevator cores were clustered in the middle of each story. The eastern side of the building was more desirable because it faced the East River, and higher-level diplomats needed large amounts of space for secretaries, filing cabinets, and other functions. As a result, low-level officials worked on the shallower western side of the building, while high-level officials worked on the eastern side. Spaces such as the women's restrooms were originally also placed on the western side, overlooking Midtown Manhattan. High-ranking officials, such as Under-Secretaries-General, had wood-paneled suites with attached conference rooms.

The offices are divided into modules measuring 4 ft (1.2 m) wide, with movable partitions that align with the facade's mullions. The offices initially included French desks as well as aluminum chairs. Some of the original furnishings were restored in 2010, while others were replaced with replicas. The building uses over 10 acres (4.0 ha) of acoustic ceiling tiles. Each ceiling has lighting fixtures spaced at regular intervals, which are outfitted with egg-crate louvers to reduce glare. The ceilings slope up near each window. (Note: Most of the ceiling is 8 ft (2.4 m) tall, but the sections of ceiling near each window are 9.5 ft (2.9 m) tall.) Each office had a set of Venetian blinds, allowing occupants to adjust natural light levels as necessary; there were 2,200 Venetian blinds in total. The New York Times reported that the building contained 7 mi (11 km) of partitions, 260 mi (420 km) of electrical wiring, 11,000 electrical outlets, and 46 mi (74 km) of pipes. Throughout the late 20th century, the original layout of the offices was changed. The partitions initially reached from the floor to the ceiling, but they were replaced with half-height partitions in 2010, when each story was converted into an open plan.

The Secretariat Building's air-conditioning system had 4,000 individual sets of controls. This system not only reduced cooling costs by at least 25 percent, but also allowed delegates and staff to customize the temperatures of their own offices. Offices within 12 ft (3.7 m) of a window are cooled by high-velocity air conditioning units underneath the windows. For offices near the center of the building, cool air is delivered through low-velocity units in the ceilings. The cool air was provided by a pair of centrifugal compressors, which could collectively generate 2,300 tons of air. There are hot-water heating units beneath the windows, within the north and south walls of the building, and underneath the floor slab of the first story; in addition, there are steam heaters in the pipe galleries. The dehumidifiers on each story are supplied by chilled water from the East River at a rate of more than 14,000 U.S. gal (53,000 L) per minute. The use of East River water precluded the need for a dedicated cooling tower, which would have required increasing the building's height and strengthening the superstructure.

On floor 38 are offices and an apartment for the Secretary-General of the United Nations. The suite was donated by the Austrian Chamber of Commerce and designed by Gerhard Karplus of New York City and Mr. and Mrs. Karl Mang of Vienna. Prior to a 2000s renovation, it was covered in walnut paneling. The Secretary-General's conference room was decorated with various pieces of furniture designed by Austrian architects and a watercolor painting by Raoul Dufy, while the Secretary-General's office on the East River had a kitchen and more Austrian furniture. In addition, floor 38 had a private switchboard and an office for the President of the United Nations General Assembly; most Secretariat employees were not allowed to visit this story.

== History ==
=== Development ===
Real estate developer William Zeckendorf purchased a site on First Avenue in 1946, intending to create a development called "X City", but he could not secure funding for the development. At the time, the United Nations General Assembly was located at the New York City Pavilion at Flushing Meadows–Corona Park in Queens. The UN had offices at a temporary headquarters in Lake Success, New York, although it wished to build a permanent headquarters in the US. Several cities competed to host the UN headquarters before New York City was selected. John D. Rockefeller Jr. paid US$8.5 million for an option on the X City site, and he donated it to the UN in December 1946. The UN accepted this donation, despite the objections of several prominent architects such as Le Corbusier. The UN hired planning director Wallace Harrison, of the firm Harrison & Abramovitz, to lead the headquarters' design. He was assisted by a Board of Design composed of ten architects.

==== Planning ====
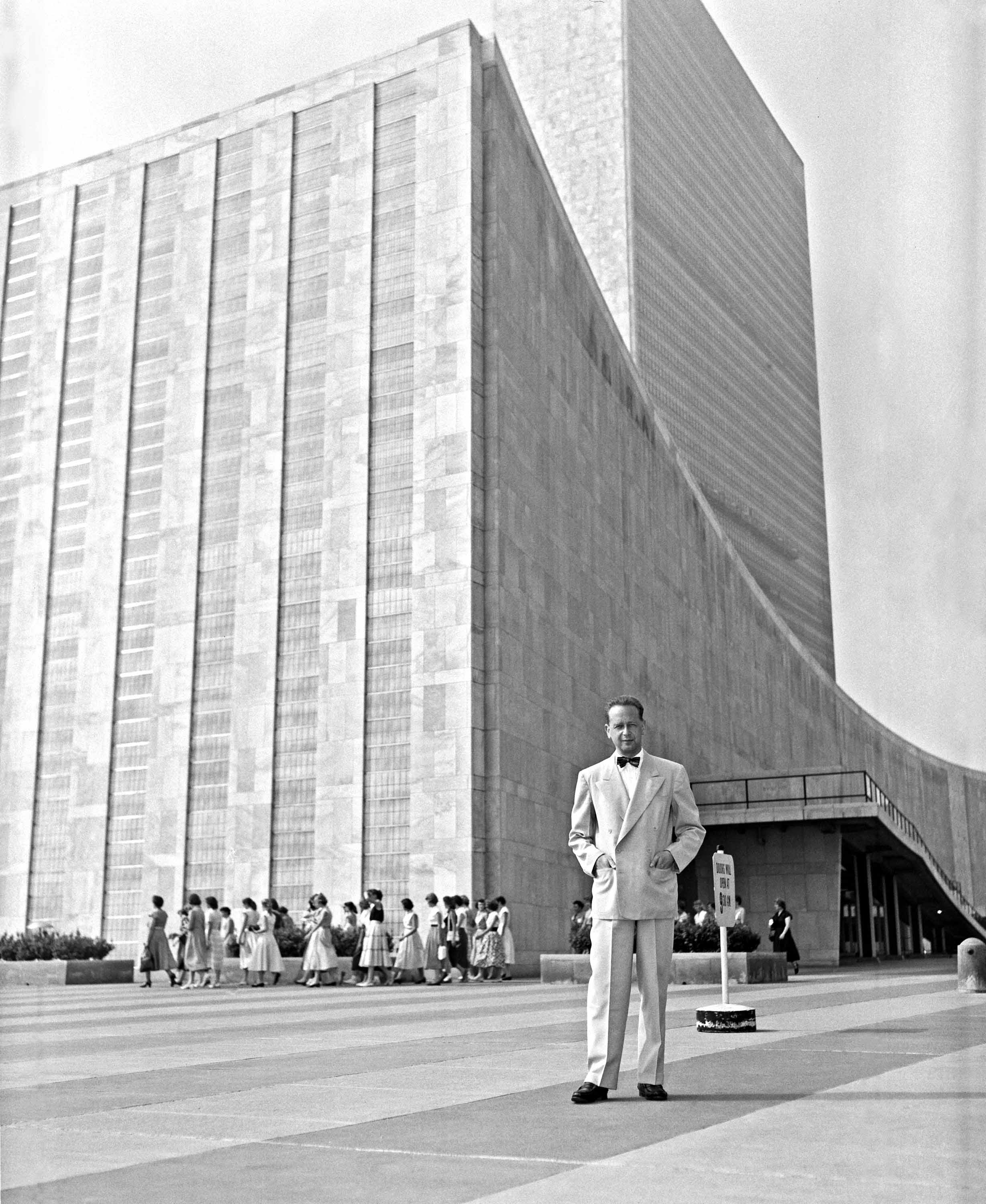
The 2nd Secretary-General of the United Nations, Dag Hammarskjöld, in front of the General Assembly building with the Secretariat Building in the background, 1953

The design process for the United Nations headquarters formally began in February 1947. Each architect on the Board of Design devised his own plan for the site, and some architects created several schemes. All the plans had to include at least three buildings: one each for the General Assembly, the Secretariat, and conference rooms. The plans had to comply with several "basic principles"; for example, the Secretariat Building was to be a 40-story tower without setbacks. It would be a freestanding tower surrounded by shorter structures, something which may have been influenced by Le Corbusier's ideals. Early designs called for the Secretariat tower to accommodate 2,300 workers; the architects subsequently considered a 5,265-worker capacity before finalizing the capacity at 4,000 workers. The tower was to be placed at the south end of the complex because it was near 42nd Street, a major crosstown street, and because the underlying bedrock was shallowest at this end.

By March 1947, the architects had devised preliminary sketches for the headquarters. The same month, the Board of Design published two alternative designs for a five-building complex, anchored by the Secretariat Building to the south and a pair of 35-story buildings to the north. After much discussion, Harrison decided to select a design based on the proposals of two board members, Oscar Niemeyer and Le Corbusier. Even though the design process was a collaborative effort, Le Corbusier took all the credit, saying the buildings were "100% the architecture and urbanism of Le Corbusier". The Board of Design presented their final plans for the United Nations headquarters in May 1947. The plans called for a 45-story Secretariat tower at the south end of the site, a 30-story office building at the north end, and several low-rise structures (including the General Assembly Building) in between. The committee unanimously agreed on this plan.

The Secretariat tower was planned to be the first building on the site, and it was initially projected to be finished in late 1948. The project was facing delays by mid-1947, when a slaughterhouse operator on the site requested that it be allowed to stay for several months. The complex was originally planned to cost US$85 million. Demolition of the site started in July 1947. The same month, UN Secretary-General Trygve Lie and the architects began discussing ways to reduce construction costs by downsizing the headquarters. Lie then submitted a report to the General Assembly in which he recommended reducing the Secretariat tower from 45 to 39 stories. The UN had contemplated installing a swimming pool in the building during the planning process, but the pool was eliminated due to objections from American media organizations. The General Assembly voted to approve the design for the headquarters in November 1947. By the next month, the architects were considering adding granite panels to the western elevation of the facade, since sunlight would enter through that facade during the majority of the workday.

In April 1948, US President Harry S. Truman requested that the United States Congress approve an interest-free loan of US$65 million to fund construction. Because Congress did not approve the loan for several months, there was uncertainty over whether the project would proceed. Around that time, the UN had decided to reduce the Secretariat Building to 39 stories. The height reduction, along with other modifications, was expected to save US$3 million. Congress authorized the loan in August 1948, of which US$25 million was made available immediately from the Reconstruction Finance Corporation. Lie predicted the US$25 million advance would only be sufficient to pay for the Secretariat Building's construction. To ensure that the project would remain within its US$65 million budget, Lie delayed the installation of the building's furnishings, thereby saving US$400,000.

==== Construction ====
The groundbreaking ceremony for the initial buildings occurred on September 14, 1948. Workers removed a bucket of soil to mark the start of work on the Secretariat Building's basement. The next month, Harrison requested that its 58 members and the 48 U.S. states participate in designing the interiors of the building's conference rooms. It was believed that if enough countries designed their own rooms, the UN would be able to reduce its expenditures. Also in October, the American Bridge Company was hired to construct the steel superstructure of the Secretariat Building. Le Corbusier insisted that the facade of the Secretariat Building contain brises soleil, or sun-breakers, even as Harrison argued that the feature would be not only expensive but also difficult to clean during the winter. This prompted the architects to erect a mockup of the planned facade on the roof of the nearby Manhattan Building. By late 1948, the Secretariat Building was scheduled to receive its first tenants in 1950.

Fuller Turner Walsh Slattery Inc., a joint venture between the George A. Fuller Company, Turner Construction, the Walsh Construction Company, and the Slattery Contracting Company, was selected in December 1948 to construct the Secretariat Building, as well as the foundations for the remaining buildings. The next month, the UN formally awarded a US$23.8 million contract for the Secretariat Building's construction to the joint venture. The Secretariat Building was to be completed no later than January 1, 1951, or the joint venture would pay a minimum penalty of US$2,500 per day to the UN. The joint venture had started constructing the piers under the building by the end of January 1949, and site excavations were completed the next month. In April 1949, workers erected the first steel beam for the Secretariat Building, and the flag of the United Nations was raised above the first beam. The cornerstone of the headquarters was originally supposed to be laid at the Secretariat Building on April 10, 1949. Lie delayed the ceremony after learning that Truman would not present to officiate the cornerstone laying. The cornerstone was held in a storage yard in Maspeth, Queens, in the meantime.

The Secretariat Building's steel structure had been completed by October 1949. At a topping out ceremony on October 5, the UN flag was hoisted atop the roof of the newly completed steel frame. The facade was still not completed; the aluminum had only reached the 18th floor and the glass had reached the 9th floor. Six days later, Truman accepted an invitation to the cornerstone-laying ceremony. New York Governor Thomas E. Dewey laid the headquarters' cornerstone on October 24, 1949, the fourth anniversary of the United Nations' founding. Construction workers completed a sample office on the eighth floor in January 1950. By that June, the building was 80 percent completed, and the first occupants were scheduled to move there within two or three months. The southern half of the parking lot, underneath the Secretariat Building, was also finished; the northern half was being completed as part of the General Assembly Building. The building as a whole was not planned to be completed until January 1951.

=== Completion and early years ===
==== Opening ====
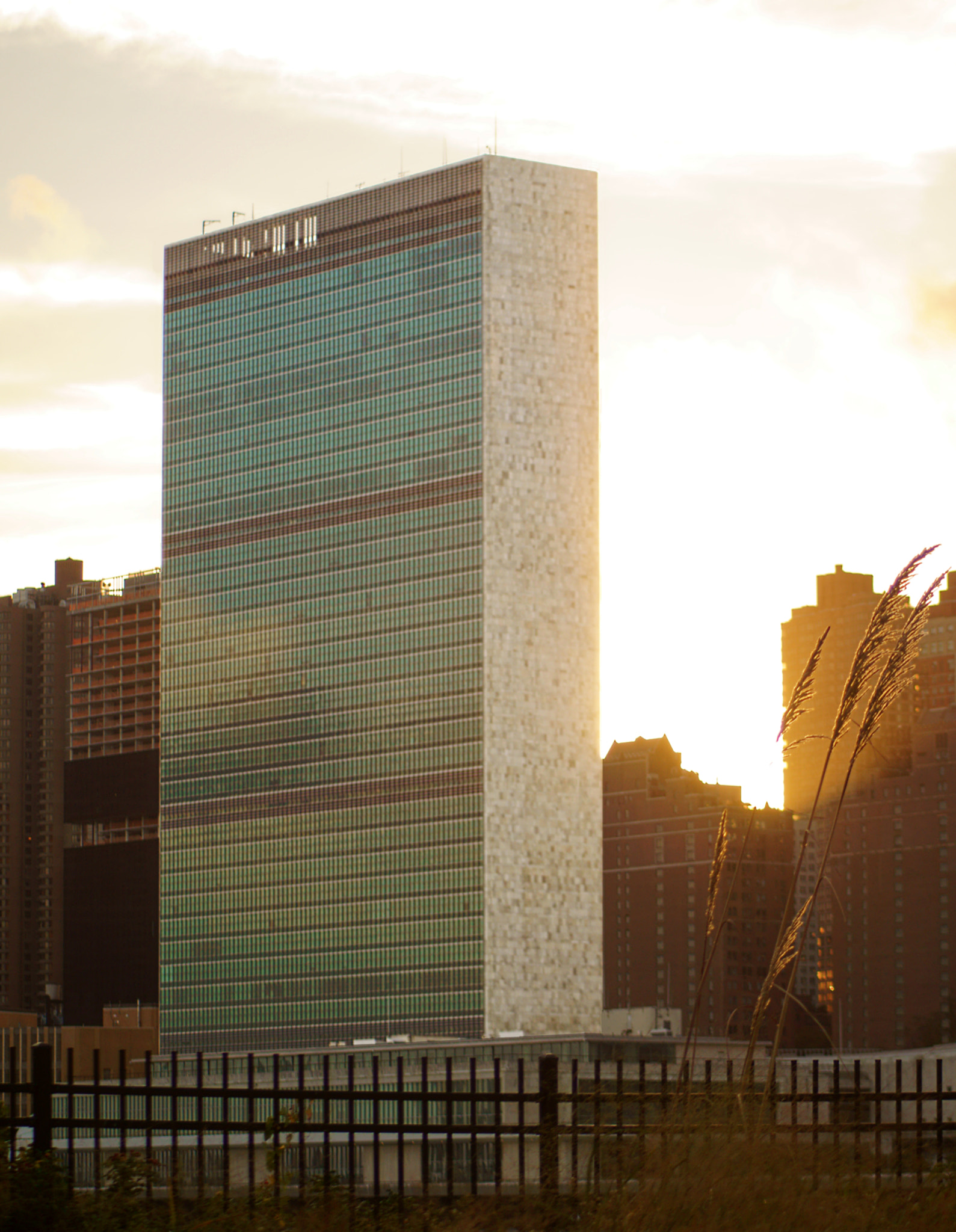
At dusk

The first portion of the building to be completed was its parking lot, which opened in July 1950. Staff started moving into the Secretariat on August 21, 1950, with 450 staff members moving into the basement levels and the first 15 stories. Staff members with frequent meetings, such as interpreters, remained at the Lake Success office for the time being. The lobby contained a temporary location for the UN's bookstore, which relocated to the General Assembly Building in 1952 following that structure's completion. At the time, the UN had 57 member states and could accommodate 13 more nations.

Initially, the UN did not allow visitors in the Secretariat Building. Shortly after the building opened, it was discovered that smoke from Consolidated Edison's nearby Waterside Generating Station was polluting the air intakes for the building's air conditioning system. The UN ultimately agreed in November 1950 to relocate the Secretariat Building's air intakes. The same month, the UN decided to spend US$360,000 to furnish three floors of offices for UNICEF and the Technical Assistance Administration. Media correspondents moved into the building in January 1951, and the Secretariat Building was fully occupied by that June. Building officials also announced in early 1951 that they would repair the windows, which were leaking due to poor weather-stripping. Officials had recorded 4,916 instances of leaks before the windows were repaired in mid-1951. During a storm that October, after the windows had been repaired, officials recorded only 16 leaks.

The building had 3,000 workers by the end of 1951. A Chicago Daily Tribune reporter said the staff were "neither united nor very peaceful", in part because staff tended to sit with those from their own countries. William R. Frye of The Christian Science Monitor said that the Secretariat Building's vertical office layout had led many staff members to express nostalgia for the old Lake Success offices. The Secretariat Building's cafeteria opened in January 1952, and the fountain outside the building was dedicated in June 1952. The Secretariat Building finally began receiving visitors that year, after the rest of the UN complex opened. By the end of 1952, the complex received about 1,500 visitors per day. Workers cleaned the building for the first time in April 1953, and repairs to the facade were completed by that September.

==== UN expansion ====
The UN's membership expanded during the 1950s, prompting officials to expand the building's communications equipment in 1958. The next year, Secretary-General Dag Hammarskjöld proposed allocating US$635,000 to install automatic elevators in the Secretariat Building due to increasing labor costs. At that time, the building received about 2,500 to 3,000 tourists a day. By 1962, the Secretariat Building was occupied by 3,000 Secretariat employees (three-quarters of the total staff), as well as other UN organizations. That year, Secretary-General U Thant proposed constructing a two-story annex at a cost of US$6.3 million, but a UN committee rejected this proposal. A journalists' club in the building was opened the same year. In 1964, a UN panel approved a proposal to replace the elevators and renovate two of the building's unoccupied stories, but it rejected other proposals to expand the headquarters. Two years later, Thant proposed constructing another office building within the UN headquarters. By then, the Secretariat Building was nearing capacity, and some organizations, such as UNICEF, had been forced to relocate. The building's manual elevators were replaced by automatic cabs in 1967.

Yet another expansion of the UN headquarters, including a park connected with the Secretariat Building, was proposed in 1968. This led to the construction of One United Nations Plaza, on 44th Street just outside the UN complex, in 1975. The main headquarters was expanded slightly from 1978 to 1981. As part of this project, a new cafeteria was built at the northern end of the headquarters, and the Secretariat Building's cafeteria was converted into additional offices. Another office tower outside the headquarters proper, Two United Nations Plaza, was completed in 1983. By then, the Secretariat had over 6,000 employees, some of whom were forced to work within the United Nations Plaza towers. The new buildings were barely sufficient to accommodate the UN's demand for office space; the organization itself had expanded to 140 members by the 1970s. Furthermore, the Secretariat Building's tenant list had largely remained constant from its opening through the end of the 20th century. As a result, the building housed several departments that had existed since the 1950s but were unrelated to the Secretariat. Newer Secretariat departments occupied space in nearby office buildings rather than in the United Nations Secretariat Building.

=== Maintenance issues and renovation proposals ===
Due to funding shortfalls in the 1980s, the UN diverted funding from its headquarters' maintenance fund to peacekeeping missions and other activities. The Secretariat Building's heating and cooling costs alone amounted to US$10 million a year. Because the headquarters was an extraterritorial territory, the Secretariat Building was exempt from various building regulations. Furthermore, the building's machinery created electromagnetic fields, which reportedly made some employees ill. Although the General Assembly had voted to fund the installation of electromagnetic shields in the building in 1990, that money was instead used for roof repairs.

By 1998, the building had become technologically dated, and UN officials considered renovating the headquarters. The Secretariat Building did not meet modern New York City building regulations: it lacked a sprinkler system, the space leaked extensively, and there were large amounts of asbestos that needed to be removed. The mechanical systems were so outdated that the UN had to manufacture its own replacement parts, and up to one quarter of the building's heat escaped through leaks in the curtain wall. The building used massive amounts of energy because, at the time of the tower's construction, the UN had not been as concerned about energy conservation. Part of one story had been vacated because of interference from electromagnetic fields. The New York Times wrote that "if the United Nations had to abide by city building regulations [...] it might well be shuttered". At the time, the UN had proposed renovating the building for US$800 million, as UN officials had concluded that the long-term cost of renovations would be cheaper than doing nothing.

The UN commissioned a report from engineering firm Ove Arup & Partners, which published its findings in 2000. The report recommended renovating the UN headquarters over six years and adding ten stories to the Secretariat Building. Several options for renovating the UN headquarters were presented. The most expensive alternative, costing US$245 million, called for the Secretariat Building to be rebuilt in several phases, requiring the relocation of one-third of the building's staff. Another option would have cost only US$74 million and would have entailed the construction of several smaller office buildings. The UN could not secure funding for the project at the time. Following the September 11 attacks in 2001, the Secretariat Building's curtain walls were covered with a green coating, which was intended to limit damage in case of a bombing. In 2002, Secretary-General Kofi Annan proposed replacing the Robert Moses Playground with a new tower, relocating the Secretariat's offices there temporarily, and renovating the Secretariat Building itself. The UN selected Fumihiko Maki to design a building on the Moses site, but the New York State Legislature refused to pass legislation in 2005 that would have allowed these plans to proceed.

The UN then decided to renovate its existing structures over seven years for US$1.6 billion. The Secretariat Building would be renovated in four phases, each covering ten stories, and the UN would lease an equivalent amount of office space nearby. Louis Frederick Reuter IV was the original architect for the renovation, but he resigned in 2006 following various disputes between UN and US officials. Michael Adlerstein was hired as the new project architect. Engineering firm Skanska was hired to renovate the Secretariat, Conference, and General Assembly buildings in July 2007. At that point, the cost of the project had risen to US$1.9 billion. Prior to the start of the renovation, in 2008, Secretary-General Ban Ki-moon approved a pilot program to reduce heat emissions by raising temperatures throughout the building. By then, the offices had been rearranged so frequently that the heating and cooling system no longer worked as intended.

=== Substantial renovation and reopening ===
The renovation of the United Nations headquarters formally began in 2008. Adlerstein planned to reconstruct the Secretariat Building's offices entirely while preserving the appearance of the exterior and public spaces. All of the building's 5,000 workers had to relocate to nearby office space. Work on the building began in mid-2010. The work involved redesigning the mechanical systems, adding blast protection, and upgrading the building to conform to New York City building codes. In addition, large amounts of asbestos were removed from the structure, and workers installed a fire-alarm and sprinkler system. The curtain wall was also rebuilt in several sections, starting from the lowest levels and working upward. The building was also retrofitted with various green building features as part of the project.

The building reopened in phases, with the first workers returning in July 2012. On October 29, 2012, the basement of the UN complex was flooded due to Hurricane Sandy, leading to a three-day closure and the relocation of several offices. By that December, the last workers had moved back into the Secretariat Building. Following the renovation, the Secretariat Building housed all of the Secretariat's divisions. Some of the building's previous occupants, such as the Department of Peace Operations, had relocated to other buildings. In 2019, due to a budget shortfall, the UN curtailed heating and air-conditioning service in the building, and it shut down some of the Secretariat Building's escalators.

== Impact ==
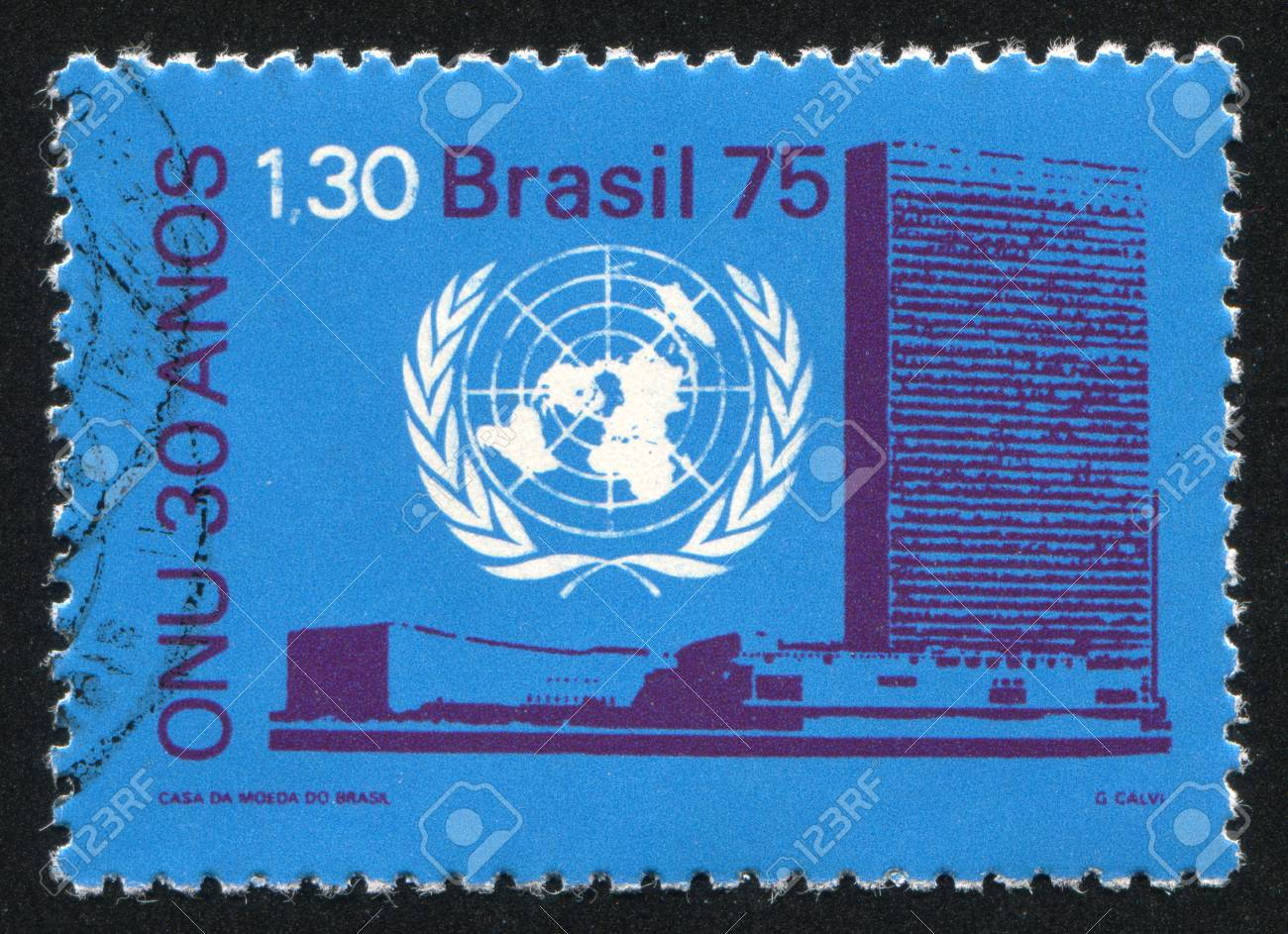
Illustration of the Secretariat Building on a 1975 Brazilian stamp

When the Secretariat Building was being constructed in June 1949, Building magazine described the tower as "a vast marble frame for two enormous windows ... a mosaic reflecting the sky from a thousand facets". Newsweek characterized the structure as being "a cross between Hiroshima, an Erector set, and a glazier's dream house". Upon the building's completion in 1951, Office Management and Equipment magazine presented UN officials with a plaque recognizing the building as "office of the year". The Secretariat Building's staff quickly nicknamed it the "Glass House".

Following the building's completion, it received a significant amount of architectural commentary, though reviews were mixed. Vogue magazine compared the tower to an "ice-cream sandwich", describing it as being "as much monument as office". Time magazine wrote: "Some architectural critics have called the Secretariat everything from a 'magnified radio console' to 'a sandwich on end'." The architect Henry Stern Churchill wrote of the building: "Visually it completely dominates the group; when one thinks of U.N. one thinks only of the vast green-glass, marble-end slab." Architectural Forum wrote: "Not since Lord Carnarvon discovered King Tut's Tomb in 1922 had a building caused such a stir." The architect Aaron Betsky wrote in 2005: "The Secretariat becomes both an abstraction of the office grids behind it and an abstract painting itself, posed in front of Manhattan as one approaches from the major airports on Long Island."

Some critics had negative views of the building. British architect Giles Gilbert Scott described the Secretariat Building as "that soapbox", saying: "I don't know whether that's architecture." Architectural critic Lewis Mumford regarded the building as a "superficial aesthetic triumph and an architectural failure" that was only enlivened during the nighttime when the offices were illuminated. He wrote of the interiors: "So far from the being the model office building it might have been, it really is a very conventional job." Mumford reluctantly acknowledged that the building could be a global symbol, saying that the building represented the fact that "the managerial revolution has taken place and that bureaucracy rules the world".

Other glass-walled buildings in Manhattan, such as Lever House, the Corning Glass Building, and the Springs Mills Building, were built after the United Nations Secretariat Building. The development of Lever House and the glass-walled Seagram Building, in turn, led to development of other glass-walled skyscrapers worldwide. Additionally, One United Nations Plaza was designed to complement the style of the Secretariat Building. The Secretariat Building and its connected structures have been depicted in numerous films such as The Glass Wall (1953) and North by Northwest (1959). The 2005 film The Interpreter was the first filmed inside the headquarters.

In September 2021, at the 76th session of the United Nations General Assembly, BTS filmed a performance video of "Permission to Dance" a track from their single album Butter, set inside and around the United Nations Secretariat Building.

== See also ==
- List of tallest buildings in New York City
- United Nations in popular culture
