= Kips Bay Generating Station =

Power station in Manhattan, New York (1926–1987)

Coordinates: 40°44′40″N 73°58′19″W

Kips Bay Generating Station was a steam plant in Manhattan, New York City, that operated from 1926 until 1987. The facility was located in the Murray Hill neighborhood on the east side of First Avenue between East 35th and 36th streets, alongside the East River. Originally built by the New York Steam Corporation, the plant produced steam for the New York City steam system and was later operated by Consolidated Edison after merger of the companies. The steam plant was demolished from 1987 to 1994. As part of the decommissioning and sale of Con Edison's nearby Waterside Generating Station in 2005, the former site of the Kips Bay Generating Station was sold to a private developer, remediated, and redeveloped into high-rise apartments and a school.

== History ==
=== Opening and early years ===
In the 1920s, the New York Steam Corporation underwent an important stage of expansion of its district heating system that coincided with the development of many large buildings in Midtown Manhattan, including those in the area near Grand Central Terminal. The corporation's growth during this period included the construction of the Kips Bay Generating Station, which was the fourth steam plant constructed by the corporation, and an increase in steam production capacity at its Sixtieth Street Station on the East River. The company also secured an arrangement to obtain steam produced during off-peak hours from the Waterside Generating Station—a nearby electric power station operated by the New York Edison Company—as the peak demand for steam normally occurred in the morning hours while the peak demand for electricity occurred in the afternoon hours.

Plans for the construction of a new power plant for the New York Steam Corporation located at 407–425 East 35th Street were filed with the Manhattan Bureau of Buildings in June 1926. The drawings called for a 145-foot-high (44 m) structure occupying a footprint of 188 by 151 feet (57 by 46 m). The plant was built on the former site of a lumber yard located on the eastern portion of the block bounded by East 35th Street on the south, East 36th Street on the north, First Avenue on the west, and the East River on the east. The general contract for construction of the steam power plant was awarded to Dwight P. Robinson & Co.

The first boiler of the station was placed into service on December 23, 1926, and two additional boilers were operating by the end of the year. The three water-tube boilers were manufactured by the Ladd Water Tube Boiler Company and designed in consultation with Combustion Engineering and Thomas E. Murray, Inc. Each boiler could generate up to 325,000 pounds (147,000 kg) of steam per hour. The plant had been placed into operation while it was still under construction in order to meet New York City's demand for steam. Expansion of the plant continued with the addition of two more boilers to increase its capacity; a fourth boiler was placed into service in 1927 and the fifth boiler began operating on November 29, 1930. After enlargement, the plant had a total capacity of 2,450,000 pounds (1,110,000 kg) of steam per hour and was the largest central station steam generating plant in the world. The facility also contained generators producing up to 13,000 kilowatts of power for the sole purpose of running its equipment. The plant had seven coal pulverizing mills, one of which had a capacity of 50 short tons (45,000 kg) per hour and was the largest of its type in the world. The location of the steam plant adjacent to the East River allowed barges to dock next to the facility and unload the coal used as fuel for the boilers. The plant contained a single smokestack 380 feet (120 m) in height.

The increased capacity and dependable supply of steam provided by the New York Steam Corporation enabled the New York Central Railroad to close both of its boiler plants that supplied steam to the Grand Central Zone (also known as Terminal City) in 1929. These included the railroad's steam plant at Park Avenue and East 50th Street, which was replaced by the Waldorf Astoria New York, and its steam plant underneath Grand Central Terminal, which was repurposed as the M42 sub-basement.

=== Subsequent modifications ===
In 1942, the final link of the East River Drive from East 34th to 49th streets was completed adjacent to the Kips Bay Generating Station. Although the segment of highway next to the steam plant was constructed using land reclamation from the East River, it necessitated $700,000 of modifications to the systems that transported coal and ash between the plant and barges docked in the river.

Consolidated Edison fully merged with the New York Steam Company on March 8, 1954. The steam company was originally established as an independent utility in 1879 and Consolidated Gas (now Consolidated Edison) had acquired a controlling interest in the company in 1929. In the late 1960s, the plant was capable of burning coal and fuel oil and had a total capacity of 2,273,000 pounds (1,031,000 kg) of steam per hour, which was more steam than all of Con Edison's other facilities combined. The use of coal was discontinued by the early 1970s and the plant's coal handling facilities were demolished. At this time, Con Edison added a 255,000-US-gallon (970,000 L) underground storage tank, a pump house, and other equipment to the storage yard on the west end of the plant as well as a sidewalk plaza on the east side of First Avenue. The underground storage tank was used as a backup fuel supply for the Waterside Generating Station. Fuel oil was delivered by barges to a pier on the East River located to the south of the foot of East 36th Street and piped to the plant's storage tanks.

=== Closure and redevelopment ===
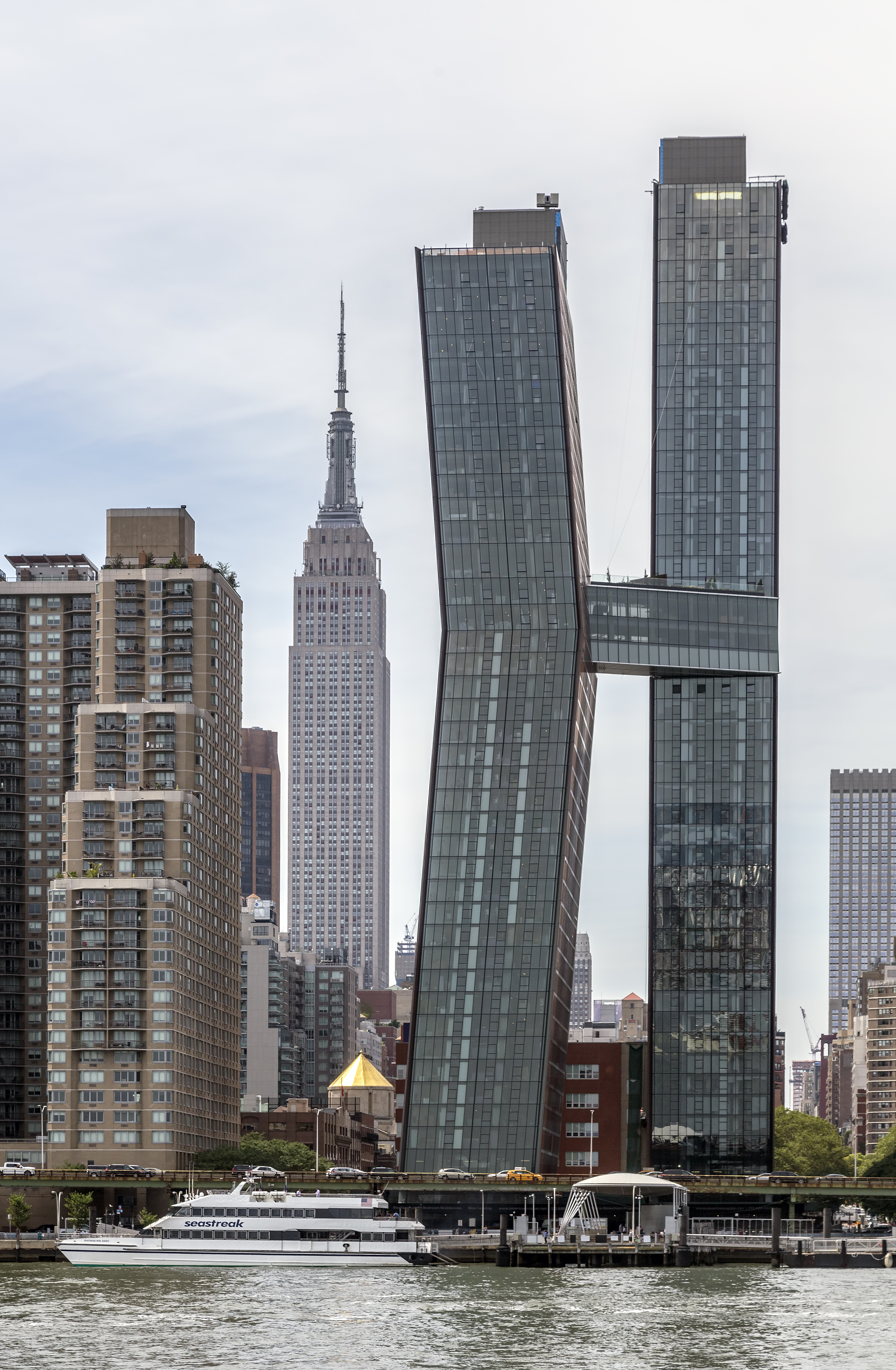
Redevelopment on the site included a pair of residential skyscrapers

In the mid-1980s, the neighborhood surrounding the steam plant between First Avenue and the FDR Drive began to change when some of the blocks were rezoned from manufacturing to commercial districts to allow for residential development, which led to the construction of the Rivergate, Manhattan Place, and Horizon high-rise apartment buildings. While the above-grade portions of the steam plant were demolished from 1987 to 1994, the site had subsequently been used by Con Edison for vehicle storage and continued to serve as a backup fuel storage site for the Waterside Generating Station. All of the remaining surface and subsurface structures at the site—then referred to as the Kips Bay Fuel Terminal—were demolished and removed by 2004.

Con Edison listed the former site of the Kips Bay Generating Station for sale in 1999 along with two other nearby properties owned by the utility. Later that year, Con Edison announced plans to sell the site of the Waterside Generating Station to private developers along with three other properties that had been placed on the market. Con Edison closed on the sale of these properties in 2005, the same year that the Waterside plant was decommissioned. In 2008, environmental remediation of the properties was completed and a rezoning of the sites was approved by the New York City Planning Commission and the New York City Council.

The block that formerly contained the steam plant was redeveloped with an elementary school that opened in 2013 (P.S. 281 – The River School) and a pair of residential skyscrapers, American Copper Buildings, that were completed in 2017 and 2018. The former fueling pier of the Kips Bay Generating Station was incorporated into the East 34th Street Ferry Landing.
