= The Copper (building) =

Residential skyscrapers in Manhattan, New York

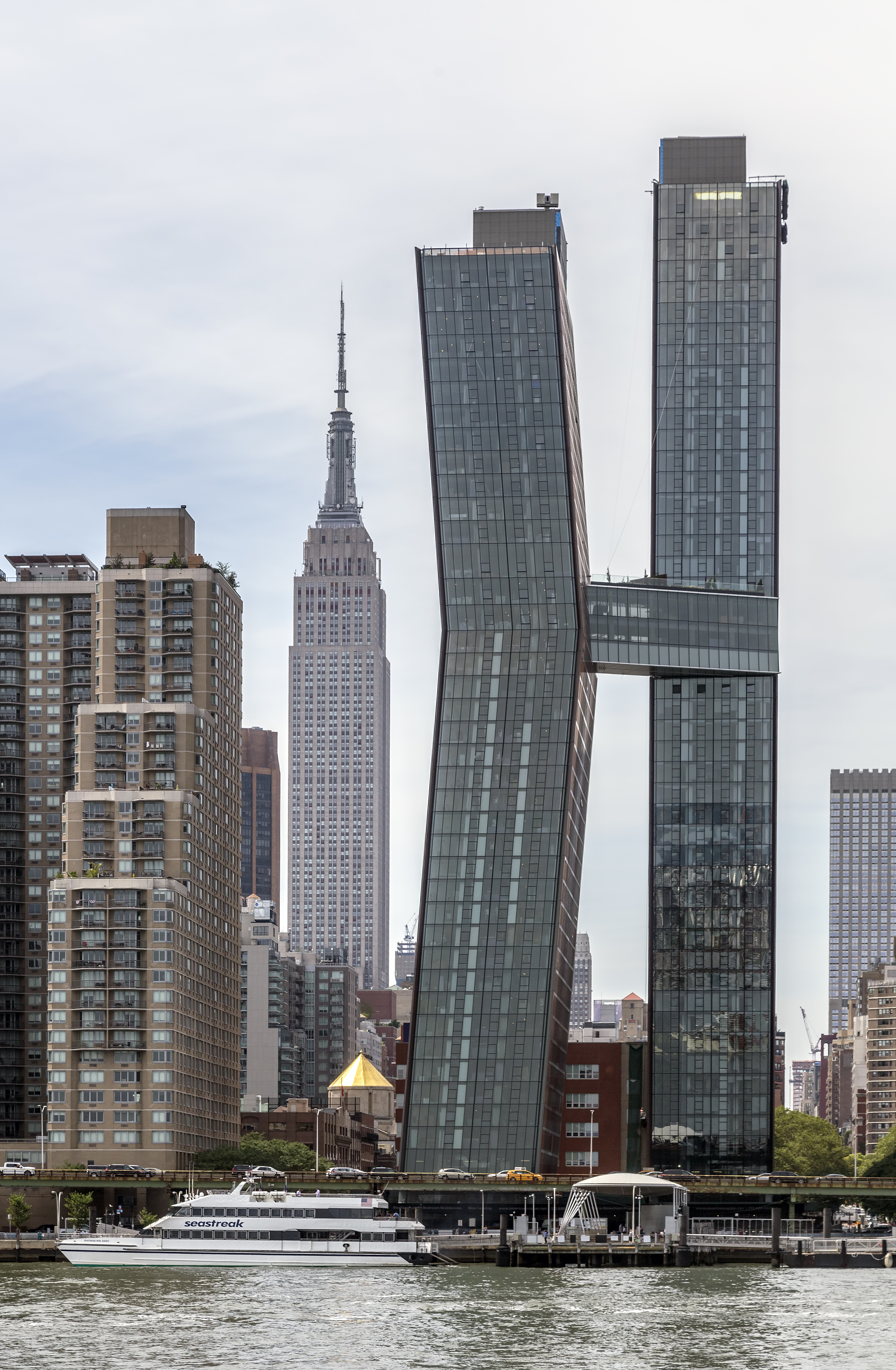
- View from the East River
- Interactive map of the The Copper area
- Former names: American Copper Buildings; 626 First Avenue

General information
- Status: Completed
- Type: Residential
- Location: 626 First Avenue; Kips Bay
- Coordinates: 40.74454°N 73.972°W
- Completed: 2017
- Operator: GO Management; GO Partners

Height
- Roof: 540 feet (160 m) (West tower); 470 feet (140 m) (East tower)

Technical details
- Floor count: 48 (West tower); 41 (East tower)
- Floor area: 824,000 square feet (76,600 m^{2})

Design and construction
- Architect: SHoP Architects
- Developer: JDS Development Group
- Other designers: SCAPE (landscape architect)
- Main contractor: JDS Construction Group / Facade by The Elicc Group

Other information
- Number of units: 761
- Parking: 294 spaces

The Copper (formerly known as American Copper Buildings and 626 First Avenue) is a complex consisting of two luxury residential skyscrapers in the Murray Hill neighborhood of Manhattan in New York City. The buildings were developed by JDS Development and were designed by SHoP Architects with interiors by SHoP and K&Co. The buildings are one of several major collaborations between JDS and SHoP; others include 111 West 57th Street, also in Manhattan, and The Brooklyn Tower in Brooklyn.

The site of the two towers was originally a lot that hosted Consolidated Edison's Kips Bay Generating Station. The developer Sheldon Solow bought the generating station's site and resold a portion of the site to JDS in 2013. JDS built the American Copper Buildings from 2014 to 2016; American Copper West opened in April 2017, and American Copper East opened in late 2018. The facade is clad in copper and glass, and the structures are designed so they appear to bend toward each other. The two towers are connected by a three-story skybridge, which includes some of the buildings' amenity spaces. The buildings are residential and include 761 rental units, 20% of which are affordable.

== History ==
=== Planning and construction ===
The site of the two towers was originally a lot that hosted the Consolidated Edison Kips Bay Generating Station. The lot was one of three parcels purchased by Sheldon Solow (along with the former Consolidated Edison Waterside power plant on the east side of First Avenue from 38th to 41st streets) and was planned to be redeveloped as part of a seven-tower, $4 billion complex designed by Skidmore, Owings & Merrill. The SOM plan would also have included a park and a public school, as well as an adjacent public space designed by American architect Richard Meier.

Solow sold the southwest corner of the lot in 2010 to the New York City School Construction Authority for $33.25 million, which was used to build P.S. 281 – The River School. He later sold the remaining plot on 35th Street to JDS and Largo in 2013 for $172 million. JDS and Largo secured a loan from Cornerstone Real Estate Advisors to purchase the land. Following a ULURP, Solow changed his plans to a twin-tower structure, which JDS followed per the zoning, although with a new architect. JDS executives were attracted to the lot in part due to the waterfront location and proximity to the United Nations and Langone Medical Center.

Construction began on the site in mid-2014, and the copper cladding was first applied in mid-2015. The west and east towers topped out in late 2015 and early 2016, respectively, and installation of the skybridge between the two towers began in January 2016. The official name of the towers – The American Copper Buildings – was released in April 2016 as the property launched initial leasing efforts. In December 2016, the project received a $500 million senior mortgage from American International Group along with a $160 million mezzanine loan from Apollo Global Management and SL Green Realty.

=== Opening ===
The two separate structures opened in phases for renters, with American Copper West opening in April 2017 and American Copper East in late 2018. A cafe called Hole in the Wall opened in the base of the east tower in June 2019.

JDS and Baupost entered into a contract to sell the property to investors Black Spruce Management and Orbach Affordable Housing Solutions in December 2021 for about $850 million. The high price has been interpreted as indicative of broader investor confidence in the recovery of New York City despite the ongoing COVID-19 pandemic. JPMorgan provided $675 million in financing to Black Spruce and Orbach in March 2022.

== Architecture ==
=== Form and facade ===
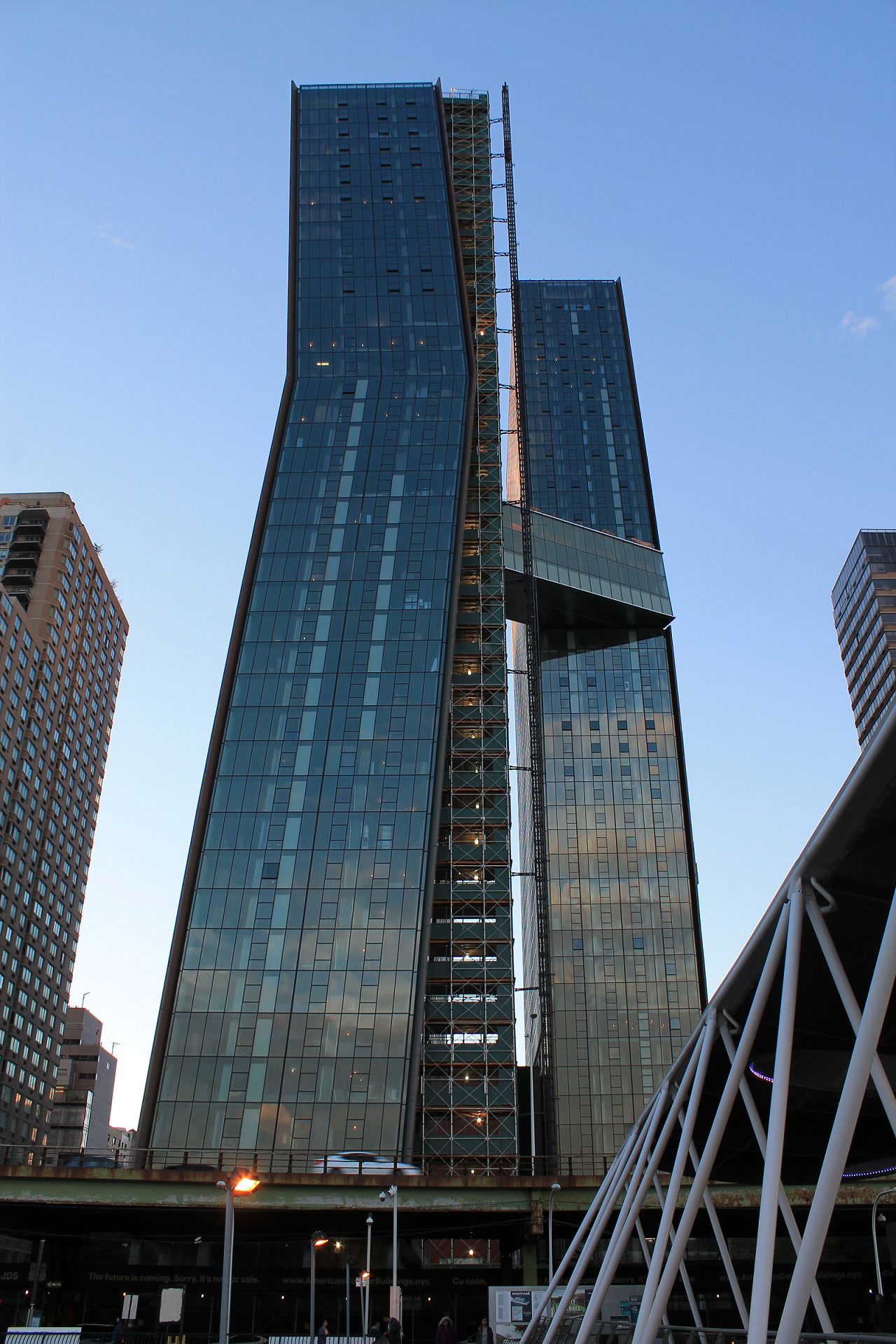
Under construction, 2016

The north and south elevations of the building's facade are clad in copper, while the east and west elevations are floor to ceiling glass. The two towers are designed such that they appear to "dance" with each other. They are connected by a three-level bridge approximately 300 feet (91 m) from the ground. The west tower is 540 feet (160 m) and the east 470 feet (140 m) high.

The copper exterior has a patina. Pure copper exposed to rain grows a thin, dark-brown film that grows denser over time and lightens to a pale gray with blue-green hues, called verdigris (a word derived from green-grey in old French), similar in color to celadon. The architect used the copper facade for texture and added variation by staggering the panels in patterns that emanate from the skybridge. The facade was installed by the Elicc Group.

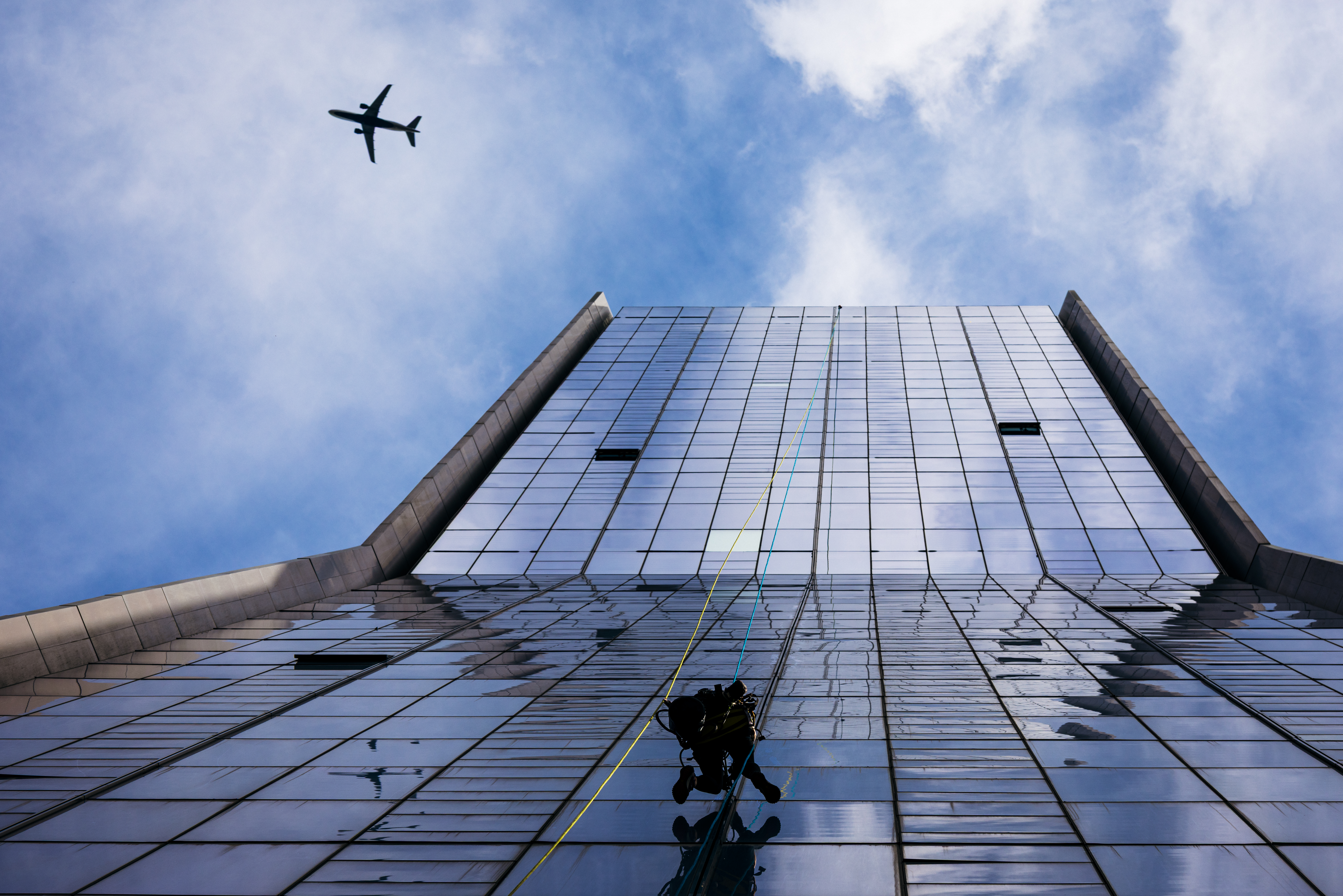
a façade technician performing a rope-access inspection on the east elevation of The Copper's west tower

==== Skybridge ====
The two towers are connected by a three-story skybridge on floors 27, 28, and 29, which includes a portion of the project's 60,000 square feet (5,600 m^{2}) of amenities such as a 75-foot (23 m) lap pool, and lounge for residents. The skybridge also includes a mechanical floor used by both towers for efficiency, creating space for the east tower's roof deck pool and lounge. Atop the skybridge are private outdoor terraces attached to adjacent apartments. According to the developers, it is the first such bridge constructed in Manhattan in eight decades. The bridge structure is composed of steel trusses that weigh up to 421,000 pounds (191,000 kg). Measuring 100 feet (30 m) long, the skybridge is clad in glass that contains an aluminum mesh interlayer that reduces solar gain and gives the appearance from the exterior as an opaque material. The skybridge was furnished by design firm K&Co.

=== Interior ===
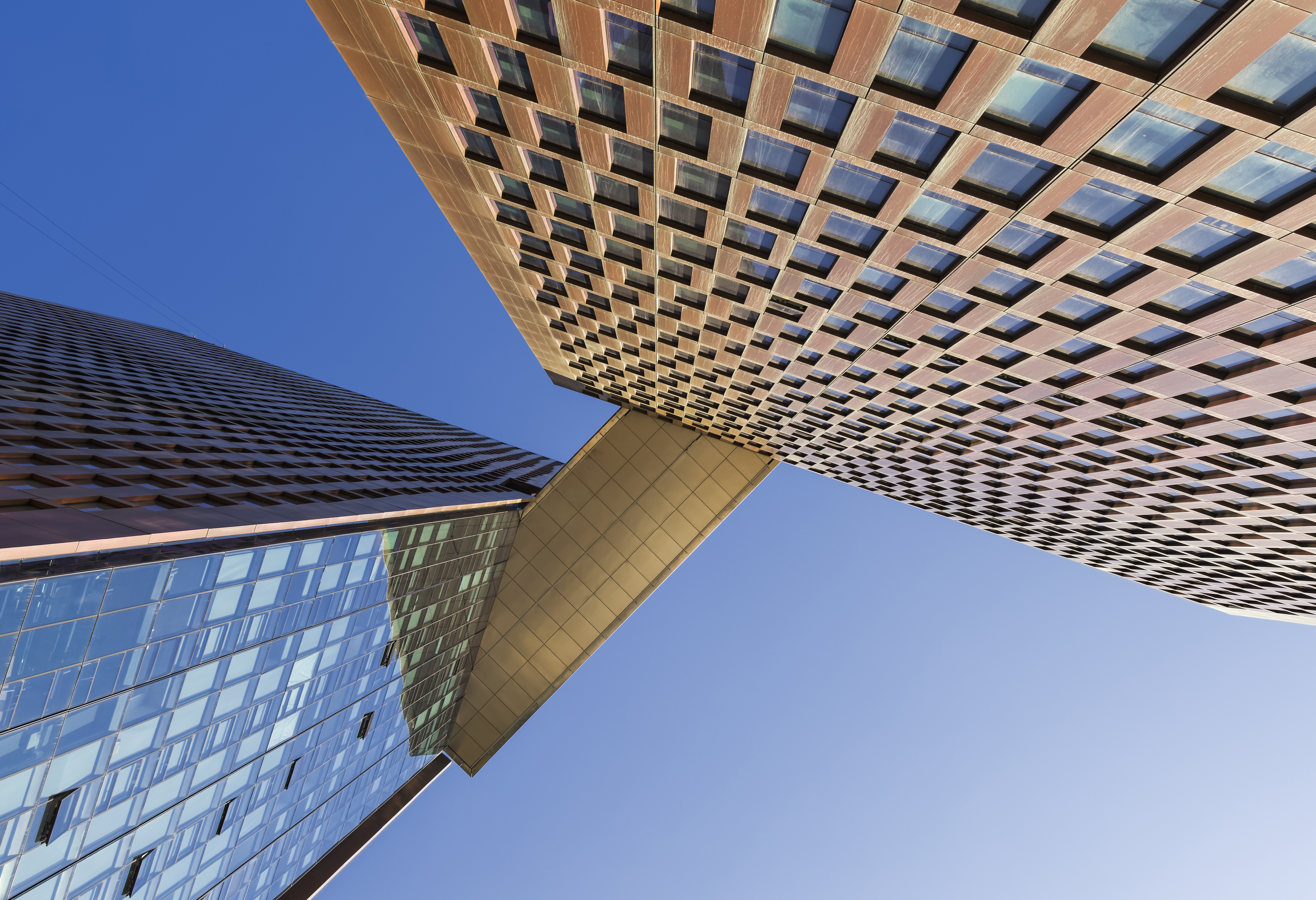
View from below the skybridge of the American Copper Buildings in 2018

The buildings are residential and include 761 rental units. Nearly twenty percent of the units in the two towers, or 160 apartments in total, are designated as affordable, with the remainder rented at market rate. The buildings are split between 725,000 square feet (67,400 m^{2}) of residential space, 94,700 square feet (8,800 m^{2}) of amenities and facilities for residents, and a small 4,100-square-foot (380 m^{2}) retail complex on the ground floor. Each tower includes its own lobby with 25-foot ceilings, custom lighting, and wood paneling. Apartments range from studios to three bedrooms. Finishes include oak flooring, light fixtures designed by the architect, Miele appliances, marble countertops and backsplashes in kitchens, and "crocodile" marble accent shower walls.

The bridge connecting the development's two towers includes a pool, whirlpool, and a lounge for residents. The building includes a gym, a landscaped plaza, and other amenities. An outdoor pool and lounge are on the top of the east tower, with the top of the west tower reserved for mechanical space.

While the buildings' parcel was for sale during Hurricane Sandy, rainfall turned an onsite pit into a "small lake". The buildings were therefore developed with precautions against floods and extreme weather caused by climate change. In the event of power loss caused by a storm, there are five emergency generators to power the buildings' eight passenger and two freight elevators and to provide power to tenants' refrigerators and a single outlet in each apartment for an indefinite period of time. Architectural choices were also informed by potential floods. Lobby walls utilize stone instead of wood, and the buildings' copper covering begins approximately 20 feet (6.1 m) above the ground, preventing potential damage from high waters.

== Reception and awards ==
The project has been praised by architecture critics for moving away from all glass design to embrace texture, depth, and character. It was named the Best Tall Building in the Americas at the Council for Tall Buildings and Urban Habitat's 2018 Tall Buildings Awards. SCAPE Landscape Architecture also received the ASLA-NY 2019 Award for the First Avenue Water Plaza, in the General Landscape Architecture Design category.

== See also ==
- Inclined building
