= Times Square–42nd Street station =

New York City Subway station in Manhattan

Times Square–42 Street
- New York City Subway station complex
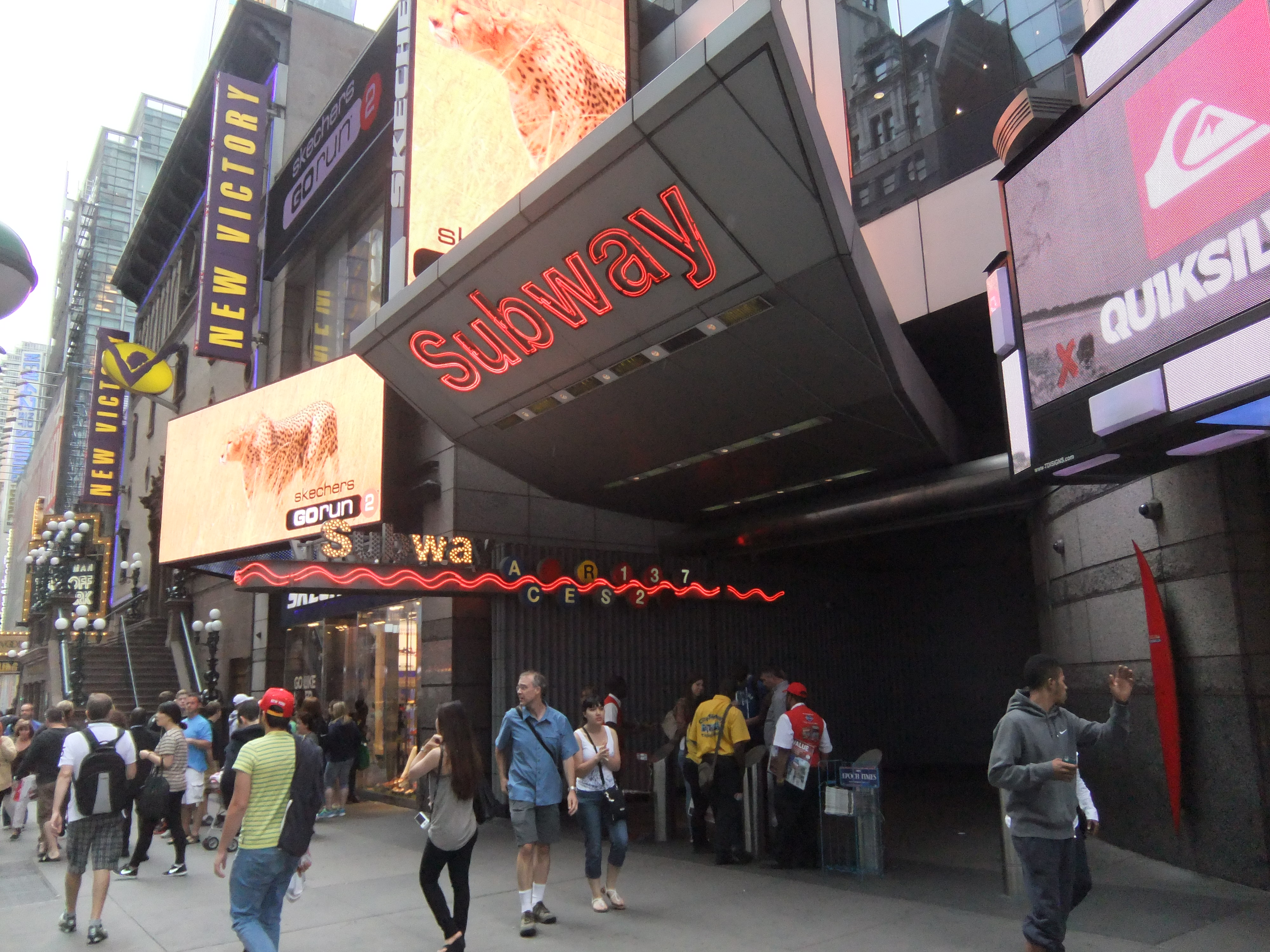
- Entrance to the station at 42nd Street & 7th Avenue

Station statistics
- Address: West 42nd Street, Broadway, & Seventh Avenue; New York, New York
- Borough: Manhattan
- Locale: Times Square, Midtown Manhattan
- Coordinates: 40°45′21.6″N 73°59′13.2″W
- Division: A (IRT), B (BMT, IND)
- Line: IRT 42nd Street Shuttle; BMT Broadway Line; IRT Broadway–Seventh Avenue Line; IRT Flushing Line
- Services: 1 (all times); 2 (all times); 3 (all times); 7 (all times) <7> (rush hours until 9:30 p.m., peak direction); N (all times); Q (all times); R (all except late nights); W (weekdays only); S (all except late nights)
- System transfers: At 42nd Street–Port Authority Bus Terminal: A (all times); C (all except late nights); E (all times) At 42nd Street–Bryant Park/Fifth Avenue, daytime (6 a.m. to 12 a.m.) only: 7 (all times) <7> (rush hours until 9:30 p.m., peak direction); B (weekdays during the day); D (all times); F (all times) <F> (two rush hour trains, peak direction); M (weekdays during the day)
- Transit: NYCT Bus: M7, M20, M34A SBS, M42, M104, SIM8, SIM22, SIM25, SIM26, SIM30; MTA Bus: BxM2 Port Authority Bus Terminal New Jersey Transit Bus: 101, 102, 105, 107, 108, 109, 111, 112, 113, 114, 115, 116, 117, 119, 121, 122, 123, 124, 125, 126, 127, 128, 129, 130, 131, 132, 133, 135, 136, 137, 138, 139, 144, 145, 148, 151, 153, 154, 155, 156, 157, 158, 159, 160, 161, 162, 163, 164, 165, 166, 167, 168, 177, 190, 191, 192, 193, 194, 195, 196, 197, 198, 199, 319, 320, 321, 324, 355
- Structure: Underground
- Levels: 5

Other information
- Opened: June 3, 1917; 109 years ago
- Accessible: Yes (passageways to 42nd Street–Port Authority Bus Terminal and 42nd Street–Bryant Park are not ADA-accessible)

Traffic
- 2025: 61,203,303 (Note: Ridership data includes Times Square–42nd Street station, 42nd Street–Port Authority Bus Terminal station, and 42nd Street–Bryant Park/Fifth Avenue station) ▲6.4%
- Rank: 1 out of 423
Location
Location within New York City Subway
Location within New York City
Location within New York
Street map
Station service legend
Symbol	Description
Stops all times except late nights	Stops all times except late nights
Stops all times	Stops all times
Stops rush hours in the peak direction only	Stops rush hours in the peak direction only
- Times Square–42nd Street Subway Station
- U.S. National Register of Historic Places
- New York State Register of Historic Places
- MPS: New York City Subway System MPS
- NRHP reference No.: 04001016
- NYSRHP No.: 06101.007629

Significant dates
- Added to NRHP: September 17, 2004
- Designated NYSRHP: July 20, 2004

The Times Square–42nd Street station is a major New York City Subway station complex located under Times Square, at the intersection of 42nd Street, Seventh Avenue, and Broadway, in Midtown Manhattan. The complex allows free transfers between the IRT 42nd Street Shuttle, the BMT Broadway Line, the IRT Broadway–Seventh Avenue Line and the IRT Flushing Line, as well as to the IND Eighth Avenue Line a block west at 42nd Street–Port Authority Bus Terminal. The complex is served by the 1, 2, 3, 7, N and Q trains at all times, the W train during weekdays; the R and 42nd Street Shuttle (S) trains at all times except late nights; and <7> trains during rush hours in the peak direction. A free passageway from the shuttle platform to the 42nd Street–Bryant Park/Fifth Avenue station, served by the 7, <7>, B, D, F, <F>, and M trains, is open during the day from 6 a.m. to 12 a.m.

The present shuttle platforms were built for the Interborough Rapid Transit Company (IRT) as a local station on the city's first subway line, which was approved in 1900. The station opened on October 27, 1904, as one of the original 28 stations of the New York City Subway. As part of the Dual Contracts between the IRT and the Brooklyn–Manhattan Transit Corporation (BMT), the Broadway–Seventh Avenue Line platforms opened in 1917, followed by the Broadway Line platforms in 1918 and the Flushing Line platforms in 1928. The original platforms were also reconfigured to serve the shuttle. The complex has been reconstructed numerous times over the years. The free transfer between the IRT and BMT opened in 1948, while the transfer to the IND station was placed within fare control in 1988. The complex was placed on the National Register of Historic Places in 2004. In the early 21st century, the shuttle station was reconfigured.

Excluding closed platforms, the Flushing Line and shuttle stations have one island platform and two tracks, while the Broadway Line and Broadway–Seventh Avenue Line have two island platforms and four tracks. All platforms and most of the station complex is compliant with the Americans with Disabilities Act of 1990, except for the IND passageway, which has steep ramps at both ends. The Times Square–42nd Street complex, including the Eighth Avenue Line, is the busiest station complex in the system, serving 65,020,294 passengers in 2019.

== History ==
The IRT platforms have been connected to each other as a transfer station as the lines opened: first between the 42nd Street Shuttle and the Broadway–Seventh Avenue Line in 1917, then the transfer was incorporated with the Flushing Line in 1927. On December 24, 1932, a 600-foot-long (180 m) passageway was opened, connecting the IND Eighth Avenue Line's 42nd Street–Port Authority Bus Terminal station and the IRT platforms, with a new entrance at West 41st Street between Seventh Avenue and Eighth Avenue. The passageway was located outside a fare control, and passengers had to pay an extra fare to transfer between the IND and the IRT station. The free transfer between the IRT and BMT was added on July 1, 1948. The block-long passageway that runs west to the 42nd Street–Port Authority Bus Terminal station was reopened within fare control on December 11, 1988.

=== First subway ===
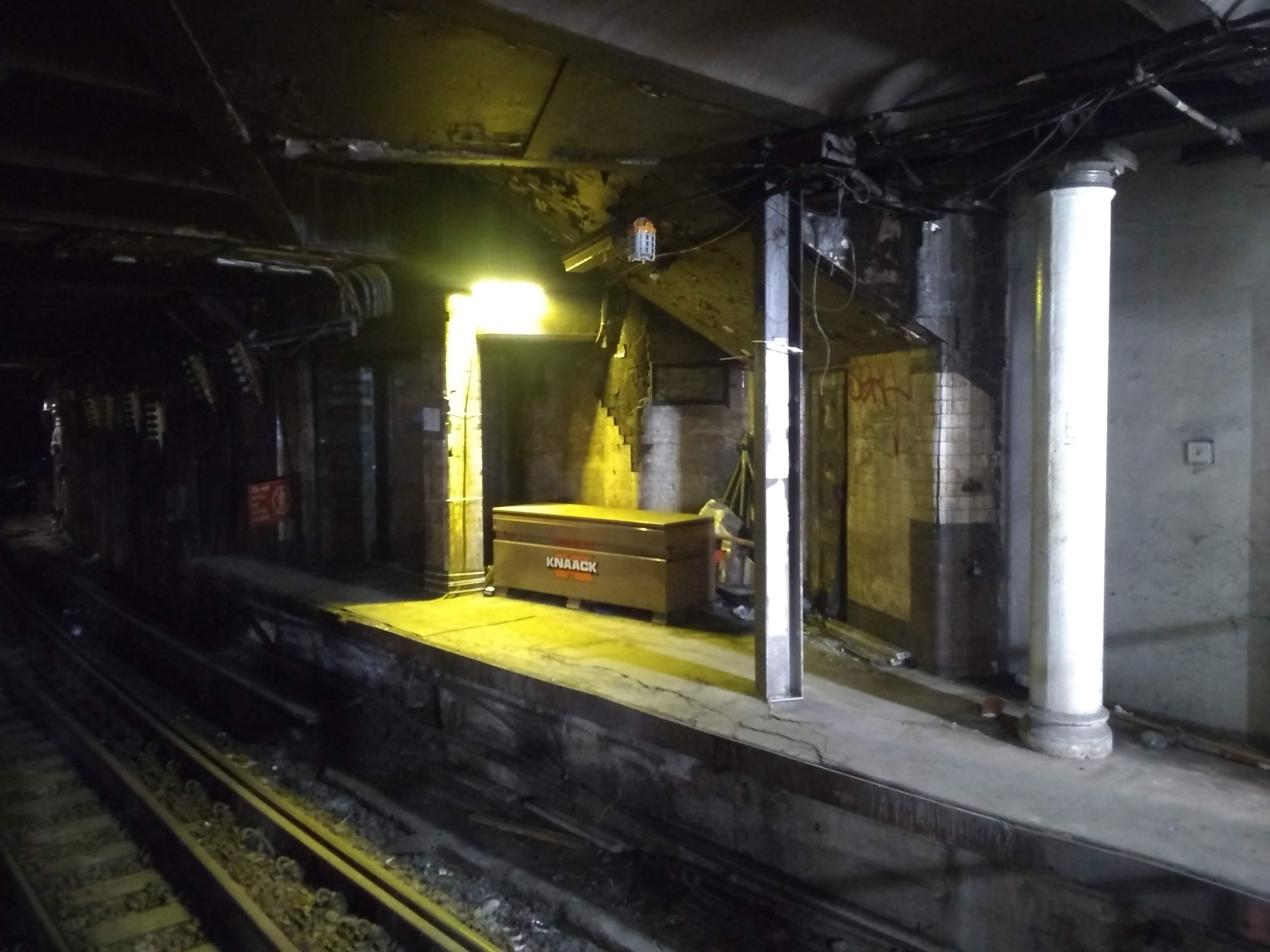
A section of the original IRT northbound platform at Times Square, now a closed-off section of the track 4 shuttle platform

Planning for a subway line in New York City dates to 1864. Development of what would become the city's first subway line started in 1894, when the New York State Legislature passed the Rapid Transit Act. The subway plans were drawn up by a team of engineers led by William Barclay Parsons, the Rapid Transit Commission's chief engineer. It called for a subway line from New York City Hall in lower Manhattan to the Upper West Side, where two branches would lead north into the Bronx. A plan was formally adopted in 1897, which called for the subway to run under several streets in lower Manhattan before running under Fourth Avenue, 42nd Street, and Broadway. A previous proposal had called for the entire length of the subway to use Broadway, but the "awkward alignment...along Forty-Second Street", as the commission put it, was necessitated by objections to using the southernmost section of Broadway. Legal challenges were resolved near the end of 1899. The Rapid Transit Construction Company, organized by John B. McDonald and funded by August Belmont Jr., signed the initial Contract 1 with the Rapid Transit Commission in February 1900, in which it would construct the subway and maintain a 50-year operating lease from the opening of the line. In 1901, the firm of Heins & LaFarge was hired to design the underground stations. Belmont incorporated the Interborough Rapid Transit Company (IRT) in April 1902 to operate the subway.

The present shuttle station at Times Square–42nd Street was constructed as part of the route segment underneath 42nd Street and Times Square, which extended from Park Avenue and 41st Street to Broadway and 47th Street. Construction on this section of the line began on February 25, 1901. Work for that section had been awarded to Degnon-McLean. By late 1903, the subway was nearly complete, but the IRT Powerhouse and the system's electrical substations were still under construction, delaying the system's opening. After the New York City Board of Aldermen renamed Longacre Square to Times Square, in April 1904, the Rapid Transit Commission agreed to rename the subway station at Broadway and 42nd Street as the "Times Station". As late as October 26, 1904, the day before the subway was scheduled to open, the walls and ceilings were incomplete.

The Times Square station opened on October 27, 1904, as one of the original 28 stations of the New York City Subway from City Hall to 145th Street on the West Side Branch. Prior to the subway station's opening, Times Square had been renamed from Long Acre Square to give the station a distinctive name. Within three years of the line's opening, the Times Square station was the city's third-busiest subway station, and its busiest local station, with 30,000 daily riders. After the first subway line was completed in 1908, the station was served by local trains along both the West Side (now the Broadway–Seventh Avenue Line to Van Cortlandt Park–242nd Street) and East Side (now the Lenox Avenue Line). West Side local trains had their southern terminus at City Hall during rush hours and South Ferry at other times, and had their northern terminus at 242nd Street. East Side local trains ran from City Hall to Lenox Avenue (145th Street).

=== Expansion ===
To address overcrowding, in 1909, the New York Public Service Commission (PSC) proposed lengthening the platforms at stations along the original IRT subway. As part of a modification to the IRT's construction contracts made on January 18, 1910, the company was to lengthen station platforms to accommodate ten-car express and six-car local trains. In addition to $1.5 million (equivalent to $51.8 million in 2025) spent on platform lengthening, $500,000 (equivalent to $17.3 million in 2025) was spent on building additional entrances and exits. It was anticipated that these improvements would increase capacity by 25 percent. Platforms at local stations, such as the Times Square station, were lengthened by between 20 and 30 feet (6.1 and 9.1 m). The northbound platform was extended to the north and south, while the southbound platform was lengthened to the south, necessitating a reconfiguration of the Knickerbocker Hotel entrance.

==== Dual Contracts ====
The Dual Contracts were formalized in March 1913, specifying new lines or expansions to be built by the IRT and the Brooklyn Rapid Transit Company (BRT). As part of the Dual Contracts, the Public Service Commission planned to split the original IRT system into three segments: two north–south lines, carrying through trains over the Lexington Avenue and Broadway–Seventh Avenue Lines, and an east–west shuttle under 42nd Street. This would form a roughly H-shaped system. The original alignment under 42nd Street would become a shuttle service, and a new set of platforms would be built for the Broadway–Seventh Avenue Line.

===== IRT "H" system =====
In December 1913, the PSC began soliciting bids for the construction of the Seventh Avenue Line tunnel between 42nd and 30th Streets, including two express stations at 34th and 42nd Streets. The new IRT line was to cross the original subway tunnel at a flat junction near 45th Street, necessitating that the new station be placed between 40th and 42nd Streets. The PSC awarded a $2.2 million contract to an IRT subsidiary, and the Board of Estimate approved the contract the next month.

The next contract to be awarded was for the section between 42nd and 44th Streets. The Oscar Daniels Company submitted a low bid for the construction of that section, Despite protests from IRT officials, who said their bid was more expensive because it included additional safety measures, the commission refused to re-award the contract to the IRT. The construction of the new junction included rebuilding the roof, moving pillars, and demolishing part of the original subway tunnel's wall. The new tunnel had been excavated northward to the existing IRT line by June 1915, and workers were laying tracks for the new tunnel by 1916.

The Broadway–Seventh Avenue Line station opened on June 3, 1917, as part of an extension of the IRT to South Ferry. A shuttle service ran between Times Square and Penn Station until the rest of the extension opened a year later on July 1, 1918. Afterward, the shuttle ran from Times Square to South Ferry. On August 1, the Dual Contracts' "H system" was put into service, and the former main line platforms became part of the 42nd Street Shuttle. Initially, a temporary wooden platform was placed over track 2 of the original subway, and black bands were painted on the walls to guide passengers to the shuttle platforms.

The Broadway–Seventh Avenue Line station was the site of a 1928 wreck that killed 16 people, the second worst in New York City history (the worst being the Malbone Street Wreck in Brooklyn, which killed at least 93).

===== BRT platforms =====
Also planned under the Dual Contracts was the Broadway Line of the Brooklyn Rapid Transit Company (BRT; after 1923, the Brooklyn–Manhattan Transit Corporation or BMT). The Broadway Line station was planned as a local station, with the express station to be located between 47th and 49th Streets. Opponents of the plan said it would cause large amounts of confusion, as Times Square was a "natural" transfer point. In February 1914, the PSC ordered the BRT to make the Broadway Line's 42nd Street station an express station. The change was made at the insistence of Brooklynites who wanted an express station in the Theater District of Manhattan.

The BRT station was to have two small mezzanines above the platforms, one each at 40th and 42nd Streets, but local civic group Broadway Association advocated for a connection between the two mezzanines. The PSC approved the construction of a large concourse above the BRT station in 1917. The concourse would only have cost an extra $1,400, but the station's general contractor refused to build the concourse because of a dispute over the price of cast-iron columns. A. W. King was hired to install finishes in the Times Square station in July 1917. The Broadway Line station opened on January 5, 1918, as the northern terminal of a shuttle service running south to Rector Street. Through service began operating in July 1919 when the line was extended northward.

===== Flushing Line =====
The Dual Contracts also included completing and opening the Steinway Tunnel as part of the new Flushing subway line. The tunnel, running under the East River with trolley loops on both the Manhattan and Queens sides, had sat unused since 1907, when test runs had been performed in the then-nearly-complete tunnel. The route, traveling under 41st and 42nd Streets in Manhattan, was to go from Times Square through the tunnel over to Long Island City and from there continue toward Flushing. The section of the tunnel between Grand Central–42nd Street and Queens had opened on June 22, 1915.

In July 1920, the PSC announced it would extend the Flushing Line two stops west to Times Square, with an intermediate station under Bryant Park. On November 9, 1921, the New York State Transit Commission opened up the contract for the extension for bidding. The extension would take a slightly different route than the one specified in the Dual Contracts. The original proposal had the line constructed under 42nd Street to a point just to the east of Broadway, which would have forced riders transferring to the IRT Broadway–Seventh Avenue Line to walk a long distance.

The Times Square station would be designed at a lower level than the two existing stations at Times Square. It would have two upper mezzanines connected by passageways: a mezzanine east of Seventh Avenue extending to Broadway, and one west of Seventh Avenue. Escalators would connect these upper mezzanines with the lower mezzanine, and a provision would be made to permit the installation of an escalator to the east of Seventh Avenue. There would be two entrances at street level at each of the western corners of 41st Street and Broadway, and two entrances at the northeastern corner of 41st Street and Seventh Avenue. The project was expected to reduce crowding on the 42nd Street Shuttle by enabling riders to use the Queensboro Subway to directly access Times Square. 24,000 of the estimated 100,000 daily shuttle riders transferred to and from the Queensboro Subway. The line was to extend as far as Eighth Avenue to connect with the proposed IND Eighth Avenue Line.

On November 22, 1921, the Powers-Kennedy Contracting Corporation was awarded a contract to construct the extension on a low bid of $3,867,138, below the estimated cost of over $4 million. This low bid was the narrowest margin ever recorded for any large city contract, beating out the next highest bidder by 0.7 percent. While the contractor was provided four years to complete work, engineers expected to reduce the time needed to do so to as little as three years. Since work on the project had to be completed underneath the foundations of several large buildings, such as theatres, and the north end of the New York Public Library, the contractor had to provide a $1 million bond. Powers-Kennedy started excavating the line westward from Grand Central in May 1922. The Flushing Line extension was to run beneath the original line from Vanderbilt to Fifth Avenue. The contractors had completed the tunnels to Fifth Avenue by May 1923, and the Fifth Avenue station opened on March 22, 1926, as the temporary western terminus of the line. In fall 1926, it was announced that the line would be completed by January 1, 1927.

In June 1926, the Ascher Company was awarded a contract to complete the Flushing Line's Times Square station. On February 8, 1927, the New York City Board of Transportation informed the New York State Transit Commission that work on the Times Square station was sufficiently completed to enable the start of train service beginning on February 19, 1927, with the completion of work to a point between Eighth Avenue and Seventh Avenue. Plans for the construction of an extension of the line to between Eighth Avenue and Ninth Avenue to provide a physical connection with the IND Eighth Avenue Line were underway. On March 1, 1927, the opening of the line was set for March 15, the third time an opening date was set for the line. Work had been postponed given the amount of work that remained to be completed. The opening of the line was about a year behind the April 29, 1926, date specified in the contract. The delay was the result of surprisingly difficult construction. The Board of Transportation had withheld retained percentages, as allowed in the contract, penalizing the contractor, and trying to incentivize it to speed up work. No retained percentages were provided to the contractor until February 1927. The Flushing Line was extended to Times Square on March 14, 1927.

A pedestrian passageway under 41st Street, connecting the Independent Subway System (IND)'s 42nd Street station with the IRT and BMT stations at Times Square, opened on December 24, 1932; the passageway included an entrance on 41st Street between Seventh and Eighth Avenues. Passengers had to pay an additional fare to transfer to and from the IND.

=== Mid-20th century ===
==== 1930s to 1950s ====
In Fiscal Year 1937, the express-track side of the southbound Broadway–Seventh Avenue platform was extended 6.5 feet (2.0 m) to the south to provide ample space at the center door of ten-car trains. In addition, the IRT opened a new entrance to the northwestern corner of Seventh Avenue and 42nd Street through the Rialto Building, on the site of the Rialto Theatre.

The city government took over the BMT's operations on June 1, 1940. At midnight, a ceremony commemorating the transfer, with five hundred people in attendance, was held at the Times Square station. The last BMT train had left the 57th Street station five minutes earlier. When the train arrived at Times Square, BMT president William S. Menden handed over his company's properties to Mayor Fiorello H. LaGuardia, who then gave them to New York City Board of Transportation chairman John H. Delaney. The city government then took over the IRT's operations on June 12, 1940. The Board of Transportation operated the New York City transit system until the creation of the New York City Transit Authority in 1953.

As part of a pilot program, the BOT installed three-dimensional advertisements at the Times Square station in late 1948. The New York City Transit Authority (NYCTA), the BOT's successor, announced plans in 1956 to add fluorescent lights across the entire Times Square station complex. The Flushing Line platforms at Times Square, as well as platforms at all other stations on the Flushing Line with the exception of Queensboro Plaza, were extended in 1955–1956 to accommodate 11-car trains. One of the complex's entrances on 43rd Street was closed in 1957 to make way for a Times Square visitor center. This entrance was rebuilt next to the information center after numerous protests, and it reopened in July 1958.

==== 1960s to 1980s ====
A new entrance at the southwest corner of Seventh Avenue and 42nd Street opened in 1964, and a shopping arcade within the basement of the Rialto Building was closed in July 1967. The BMT station received a minor overhaul in the late 1970s when the MTA fixed the station's structure and the overall appearance, and it repaired staircases and platform edges, removed pedestrian ramps, and replaced lighting.

By the 1970s, city officials planned to raise funds for a renovation of the Times Square station complex, using sales-tax revenue from materials used in the construction of the New York Marriott Marquis hotel. As part of a pilot program to reduce high crime in the New York City Subway system, in May 1981, the MTA spent $500,000 to install CCTV screens at the Columbus Circle subway station. The MTA expanded the experiment to the Times Square–42nd Street station in 1983. The cameras were deactivated in 1985 after further tests showed that their presence did not help reduce crime. The MTA considered transferring 220 CCTV cameras from these stations to token booths at the stations with the most crime. On August 1, 1988, the passageway between the IND Eighth Avenue Line station and the IRT/BMT complex was finally placed within fare control. The two previously-separate stations had the highest crime rates in the system at the time.

=== Late 20th and early 21st centuries ===
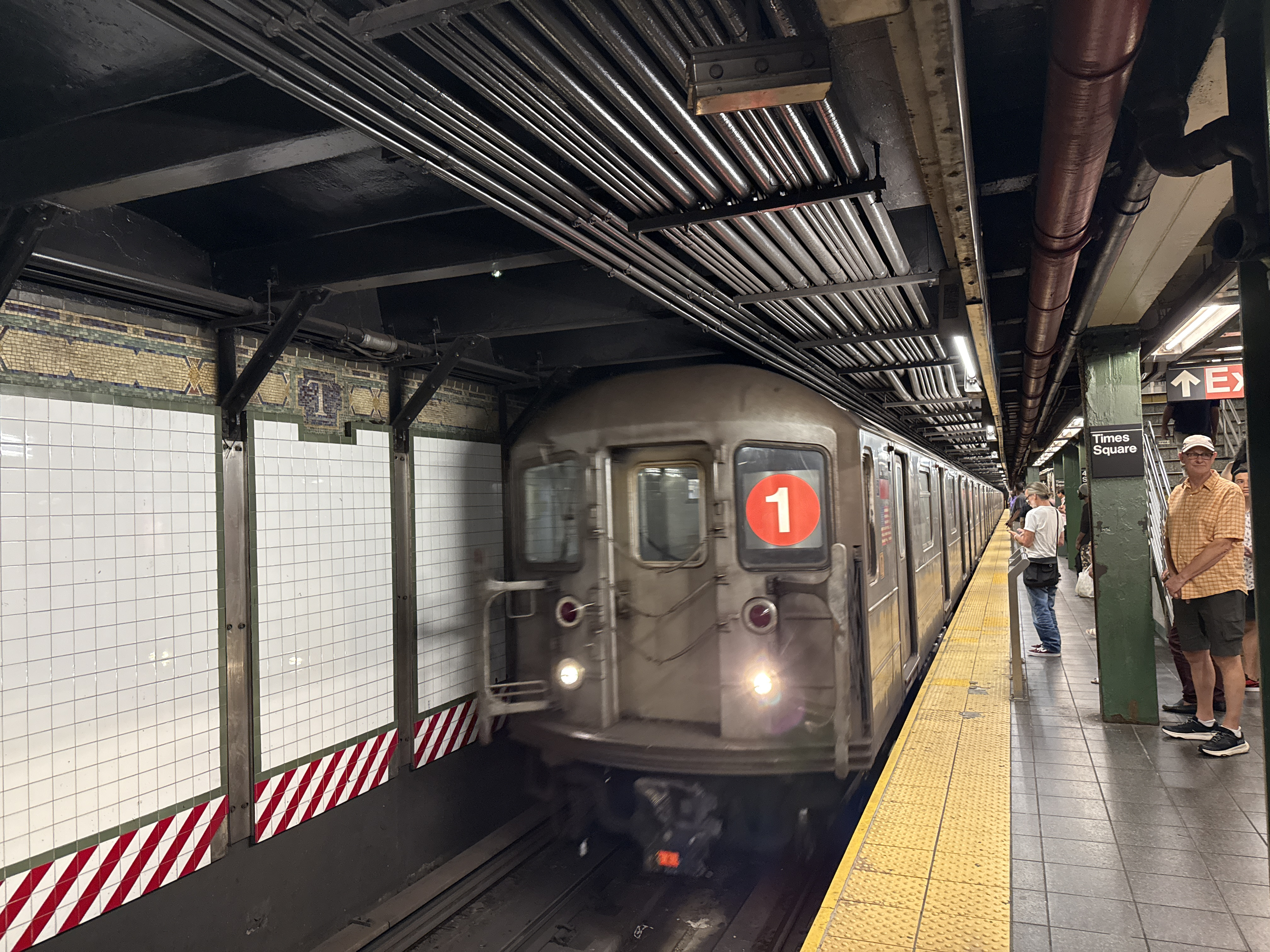
An uptown 1 train stops at Times Square–42nd Street station on the IRT Broadway–Seventh Avenue Line

The Empire State Development Corporation (ESDC), an agency of the New York state government, had proposed redeveloping the area around a portion of West 42nd Street in 1981. As part of the redevelopment, in 1988, the state and NYCTA announced that they would spend $125 million on renovating the Times Square subway complex. The project would have included an underground rotunda with stores, connecting several office buildings; new subway entrances inside these buildings; and elevators. The project excluded renovation of the platforms or the passageway under 41st Street. Park Tower Realty, which had committed to developing four buildings in the redevelopment, would have paid for 60 percent of the project's cost, while the New York City Transit Authority would have provided $45 million and the city would have provided $10 million. The project was canceled in August 1992 after Prudential Insurance and Park Tower Realty was given permission to postpone the construction of these buildings.

The station underwent total reconstruction in stages starting in 1994. Phase 1 rebuilt the Broadway–Seventh Avenue Line platforms with a new mezzanine, stairs, and elevators, and was completed in 2002. Phase 2, finished in 2006, rebuilt the Broadway Line, Flushing Line, and Eighth Avenue Line portions of the station.

==== Phase 1 and 2 renovation ====
In 1995, the MTA announced it would build a main entrance on the south side of 42nd Street between Seventh Avenue and Broadway. The site of the new entrance was occupied at the time by an "interim" retail space. Originally, the MTA had proposed consolidating 11 separate entrances to the complex into one full-time main entrance and four part-time entrances. The new main entrance opened in July 1997. It features a bright neon and colored glass flashing sign with train route symbols and the word "Subway", as well as an elevator and escalators.

In July 1998, the MTA started accepting bids for the renovation of the Times Square station. The first phase would include renovating the Broadway–Seventh Avenue Line platforms, part of the Broadway Line platforms, and the mezzanine, while the second phase would cover the rest of the station. The goal was to reduce congestion and improve rider access, comfort and safety by improving visual lines and increasing pedestrian capacity. The main corridor would be widened 15 feet (4.6 m) and the number of sharp corners would be reduced. In addition, there would be new elevators to make the station compliant with the for Americans with Disabilities Act of 1990, new escalators, and wider corridors and stairs. William Nicholas Bodouva & Associates designed the materials for the renovation. Slattery Skanska, a firm owned by Slattery Associates and Skanska, received an $82.8 million contract for the station's renovation in December 1998. Bovis Lend Lease and CTE Engineers served as construction managers for the first two phases of the project.

The renovation of the complex began when the entrances at the northwest and southwest corners of 42nd Street and Seventh Avenue were temporarily closed in May 1999. Phase 1 of the project cost $85 million and entailed expanding the main entrance on 42nd Street by 10 feet (3.0 m); making passageways as much as 6 feet (1.8 m) wider; and constructing new entrances in nearby office buildings. New entrances were added on the northwest and southwest corners of Seventh Avenue and 42nd Street. The southwest-corner entrance at 5 Times Square has both escalators and stairs. The northwest-corner entrance in 3 Times Square only has stairs because the MTA allowed the building's developer Rudin Management to pay $1.3 million instead of adding two escalators.

The second phase cost $91 million. This phase included converting 7,000 ft^{2} (650 m^{2}) of storage rooms to offices; widening a mezzanine from 12 to 60 feet (3.7 to 18.3 m); razing a 120-foot-long (37 m) passageway that contained a "mixing bowl" of stairs and elevators; and refurbishing the 700-foot-long (210 m) passageway leading from the IND station to the rest of the complex. The cost of renovating the station had exceeded $257.3 million by 2004. The mezzanine above the BMT Broadway Line, which formerly housed a record shop named Record Mart, was renovated with a large oval balcony looking over the trackway. In 2004, four unisex stall bathrooms were opened on the mezzanine between the IRT and BMT lines; they are staffed and maintained by employees of the Times Square Alliance, the local Business Improvement District. Record Mart reopened in 2007 on the south side of the IRT/BMT corridor, and when it closed permanently in 2020, it had been Manhattan's oldest operating record store.

==== Phase 3 renovation ====
During the third phase of the station's renovation, the shuttle platform would have been relocated 250 feet (76 m), and a new island platform for the shuttle would have been created. By 2004, the work was planned to be completed in 2006 at a cost of $85 million. Although planning had been completed in 2006, the project was delayed due to a lack of funding. As part of the 2015–2019 Capital Program, the MTA scheduled some improvements to make it accessible under the guidelines of the Americans with Disabilities Act of 1990. The 42nd Street Shuttle became ADA-accessible, the shuttle was reconfigured from three tracks to two tracks, and the trains became six cars long. A new platform, 28 feet (8.5 m) wide and located between tracks 1 and 4, was built along the section of the shuttle that runs under 42nd Street, which is located within a straight tunnel. The whole project was expected to cost $235.41 million. The Times Square shuttle platform was extended 360 feet (110 m) east to allow for a second point of entry at Sixth Avenue, with a connection to the IND Sixth Avenue Line, as well a second connection to the IRT Flushing Line via its Fifth Avenue station.

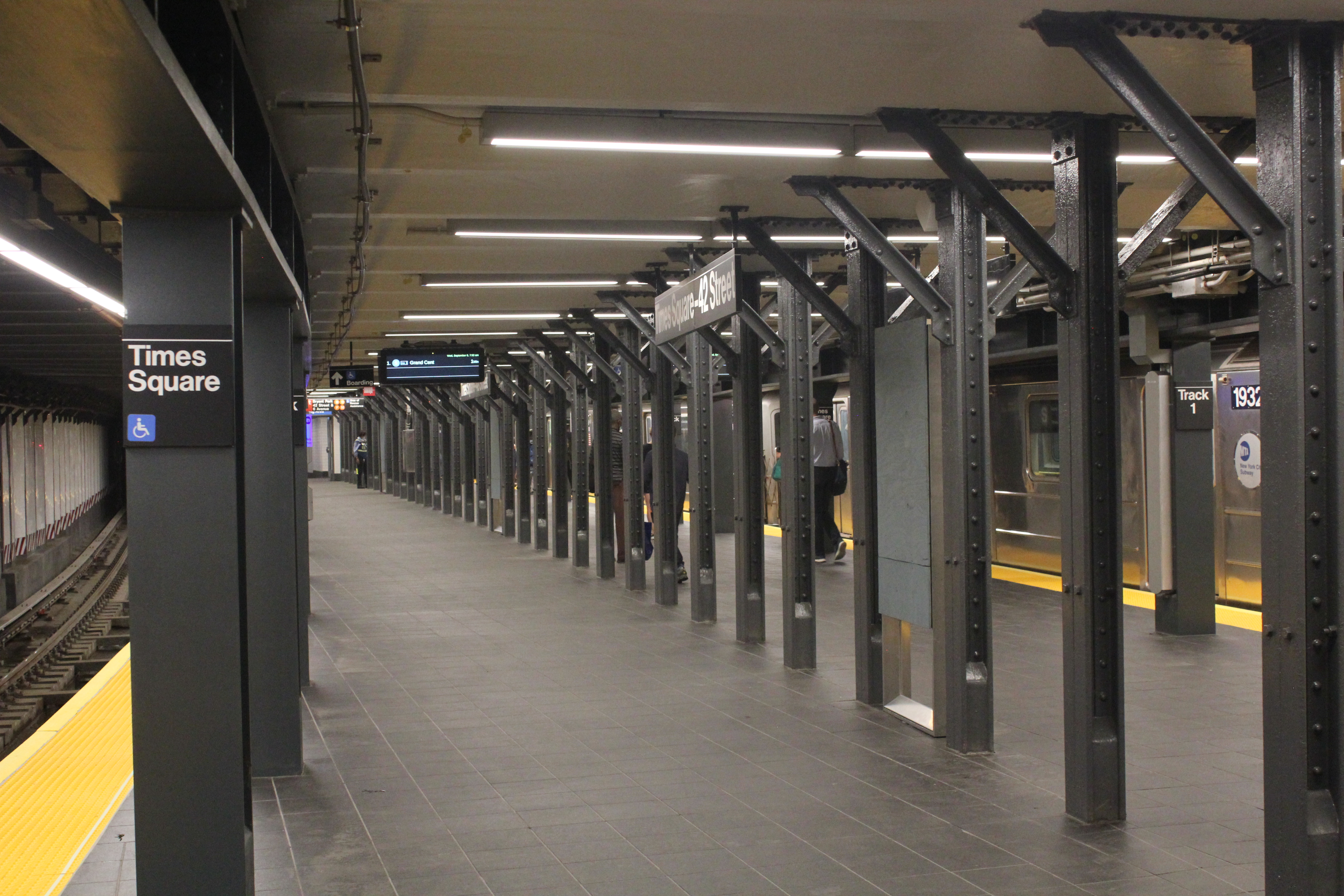
Widened platform at Times Square, which was built during the restoration project

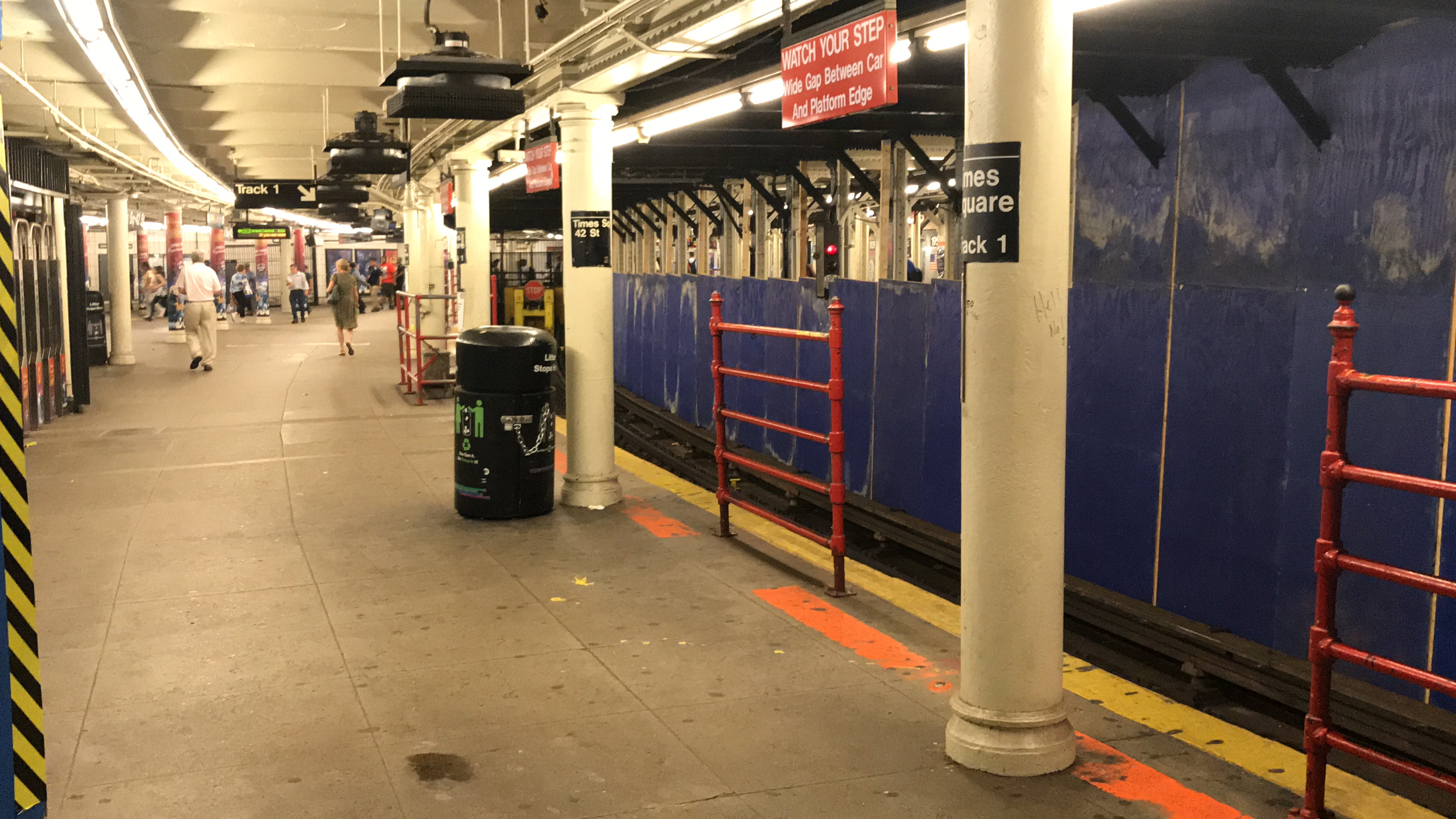
Track 1 platform at the start of construction; Track 3 (since removed) is blocked off by a blue construction wall

The entire Times Square station was rehabilitated with congestion mitigation measures. A wider stairway was installed from the shuttle mezzanine to street level, and a new control area was installed at the bottom of the stairway. The cost of this part of the project is $30 million. In conjunction, a second project added access to the Times Square complex. As part of the project, the eastern platform was closed to public access, and the exit to 43rd Street was closed, covered over, and turned into an emergency exit, starting on October 19, 2019. This entrance would be replaced by a new entrance with a 15 foot (4.6 m) wide stairway covered by a canopy. The staircase would lead from the shuttle mezzanine to street level, blocking portions of the station's original finishes. A new control area would be installed at the bottom of the stairway. To further increase capacity, 21 columns were eliminated; other columns at the station were thinned, requiring the underpinning of roof beams; and 142 columns in the concourse area were relocated away from the car doors. The cost of this project was estimated to be $28.93 million.

The new control area provided an additional 5,000 square feet in mezzanine space, while the new entrance provided an additional 450 square feet of space. The entrance's canopy has 238 triangular glass frames that replicate the crystals part of the New Year's Eve Crystal Ball. Eighteen new CCTV cameras, ten new turnstiles, two emergency exit gates, and four new digital information screens were installed in the new control area. Two new mosaics by Nick Cave, titled "Equal All" and "Each One", were installed as part of the project.

The northern section of the original west platform wall dating from 1904 was removed, and One Times Square's owner Jamestown Properties built elevators connecting the station to the street. The wall was broken into sections and moved to the New York Transit Museum to mitigate the adverse effects of the station renovation. To further mitigate damage done to portions of the original station, certain features were repaired and restored, including the original southwest platform and control area wall finishes, the original cast iron columns, the ceiling plaster ornamentation, and the cast iron guard rails. In addition, the east platform walls that were located within back-of-house space were protected. The damaged Knickerbocker marble lintel located at the west platform control area were replicated. To reference portions of the original tracks located at tracks 2 and 3, the granite paving for the shuttle platform was modified with a veneer steel rail. These 60 foot (18 m) long sections are located on the new platform between tracks 1 and 4. Finally, a plaque describing the history of the station was installed underneath the replicated Knickerbocker lintel.

The construction contract for the project was originally scheduled to be awarded in June 2018. This was delayed by several months because of changes to the project schedule and cost. The construction duration was expected to be extended by three months, and the cost would increase by $25 million, because of additions to the original construction plan. A construction contract was awarded in March 2019, with an estimated completion date of March 2022. The shuttle was temporarily closed in mid-2020 for this work. The new platform opened on September 7, 2021, along with the passageway to the 42nd Street–Bryant Park station. This made the shuttle station ADA-accessible; though the passageway was not yet accessible, elevators were planned for its Bryant Park end. The new $40 million station entrance, including the new elevator, formally opened on May 16, 2022. The MTA spent $30 million to construct the new staircase entrance and Jamestown paid $10 million for the elevator.

==== Other modifications ====
In the late 2000s, the MTA began construction on an extension of the IRT Flushing Line to 34th Street, which would require demolishing the lower level of the 42nd Street–Port Authority Bus Terminal station. By January 2010, the lower level platform was being demolished as part of the Flushing Line extension, which slopes down through where the old lower level platform was. On September 13, 2015, the Flushing Line was extended one stop west from Times Square to 34th Street–Hudson Yards.

In February 2022, the MTA announced that the IRT Flushing Line platforms would receive platform screen doors as part of a pilot program. The announcement came after several people had been shoved onto tracks, including one incident that led to the death of Michelle Go on the BMT platform. The MTA started soliciting bids from platform-door manufacturers in mid-2022; the doors are planned to be installed starting in December 2023 at a cost of $6 million. Designs for the platform doors were being finalized by June 2023. As part of a pilot program, a Knightscope K5 robotic police officer was deployed at the station in September 2023; the NYPD had removed the robot by February 2024.

=== Bombings and terrorist plots ===
A bombing at the station on October 12, 1960, injured 33 passengers. In September 2009, Najibullah Zazi and alleged co-conspirators planned suicide bombings on subway trains near this station and the Grand Central–42nd Street station, but the plot was discovered before they could carry it out. There was also a bombing on December 11, 2017, during the morning rush hour, when a pipe bomb device partially detonated in the 41st Street passageway.

== Station layout ==
Metrically accurate station map of Times Square–42nd Street, showing platforms, mezzanines, stairs, elevators, escalators, exits, ticket machines (OMNY), gates, benches, trashcans, and restrooms.

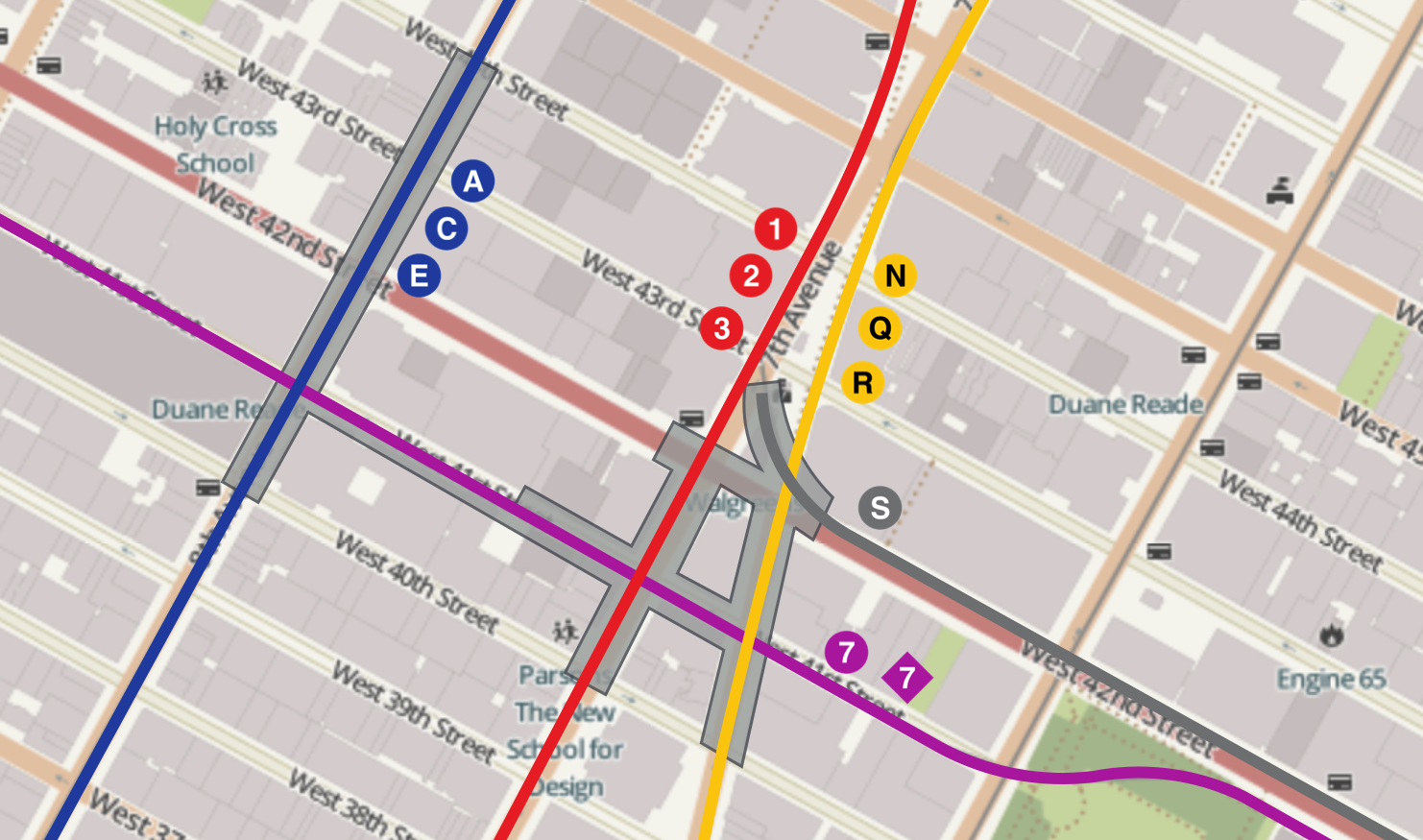
Physical locations of the platforms

Entrance

Times Square was named for The New York Times. The Times headquarters, built by Times owner Adolph S. Ochs, housed the original subway station (now the shuttle platforms) in its basement.

Four separate stations comprise the Times Square complex, which is connected to the 42nd Street–Port Authority Bus Terminal station of the IND Eighth Avenue Line. The shallowest station is the 42nd Street Shuttle platform, which runs in a northwest–southeast direction under 42nd Street east of Broadway, and is 20 feet (6.1 m) below street level. The IRT Broadway–Seventh Avenue Line station runs 40 feet (12 m) under Seventh Avenue. The BMT Broadway Line station runs in a true north–south alignment 50 feet (15 m) under Broadway. The deepest station, serving the IRT Flushing Line, is 60 feet (18 m) below street level and runs roughly west–east under 41st Street. The Times Square–42nd Street and 42nd Street–Port Authority Bus Terminal stations are both fully wheelchair-accessible. However, the ramp between the two parts of the complex is not wheelchair-accessible.

=== Mezzanines ===
There are several mezzanines throughout the complex, connected by several ramps and stairs. The primary, upper mezzanine is near the level of the shuttle platforms and consists of four passageways in a trapezoidal layout, arranged under 42nd Street, Broadway, 41st Street, and Seventh Avenue. An oval-shaped cut is on the Broadway side of the main mezzanine, below which are the northern ends of the BMT platforms. A pair of escalators to the Flushing Line is at the southwestern corner of this mezzanine. Some parts of the mezzanine have glass-tiled walls, while other parts are clad with white ceramic tile topped by mosaic bands. "Music Under New York" controls various spots within the mezzanine for performers.

Near the south end of the BMT platforms, there is a smaller mezzanine overhead, which leads to exits at 40th Street.

Under the IRT Broadway–Seventh Avenue Line platforms, but above the Flushing Line platforms, is a lower mezzanine level extending from west to east. This mezzanine connects to a steep ramp that leads to the passageway to the IND Eighth Avenue Line platforms. A 600-foot-long passageway under 41st Street connects the IND station with the rest of the complex. The passageway is located above the mezzanines at either end. It is stair-free but contains steep ramps at both ends, which are not ADA-compliant.

=== Exits ===
Exits to the 42nd Street–Port Authority Bus Terminal station, on Eighth Avenue between 40th and 44th Street, are signed as serving the A, C, E, and 7 trains. Several exits are signed as serving most or all of the services in the complex. There are two exits inside buildings on 42nd Street west of Seventh Avenue: the north side within 3 Times Square and the south side within 5 Times Square. On the south side of 42nd Street between Seventh Avenue and Broadway, there is an elevator and escalator bank inside the Times Square Tower. The street level fare control at this site features restored original "Times Square" mosaics from the Contract I station walls (now used by the shuttle). One street stair rises to the southeast corner of Broadway and 42nd Street. A block to the south, one stair goes into a building at the northwest corner of 41st Street and Seventh Avenue, and two street stairs go to the southeast corner. An exit-only stair rises to the southwest corner of 41st Street and Broadway.

Two sets of exits on 40th Street are separate from the main mezzanine areas and are signed as only serving certain services. At 40th Street and Seventh Avenue, one stair goes into a building at the southwest corner, and one street stair goes to the southeast corner. These serve a mezzanine above the Broadway–Seventh Avenue Line platforms and are signed as serving the 1, 2, 3, 7, and S trains. One street stair rises to each of the corners of 40th Street and Broadway, serving the southern mezzanine above the Broadway Line platforms. Those entrances are signed as serving the N, Q, R, W, and S trains.

There are several closed exits throughout the station complex. Until 1981, there was a stair to the southeastern corner of 41st Street and 8th Avenue. Another stair rose to the south side of 41st Street between Seventh and Eighth Avenues in the passageway between the Eighth Avenue Line station and the rest of the station complex, and was closed in 1989 due to very low usage. A street stair to the northeastern corner of 42nd Street and Seventh Avenue, by One Times Square, was closed around 1998–2000. Two stairs to the northeastern corner of 41st Street and Seventh Avenue were closed during the same time, as were stairs to both western corners of that intersection. In 2019, a stair to the southwestern corner of 43rd Street and Broadway was closed as part of the shuttle modernization project. Many of the station's entrances were historically constructed within other buildings.

== IRT 42nd Street Shuttle platform ==
Times Square
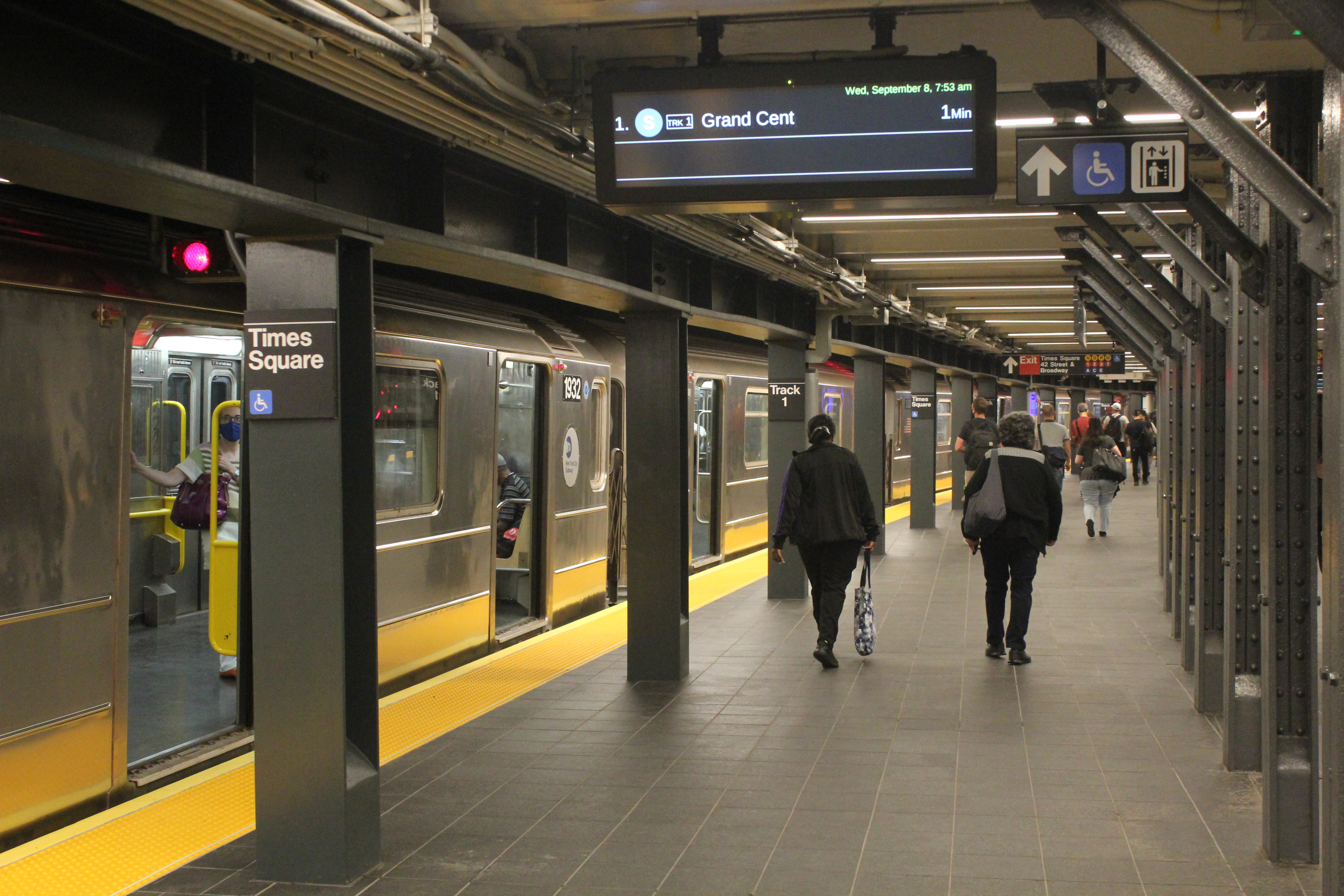
- Shuttle platform facing track 1

Station statistics
- Division: A (IRT)
- Line: IRT 42nd Street Shuttle
- Services: S (all except late nights)
- Structure: Underground
- Platforms: 1 island platform
- Tracks: 2

Other information
- Opened: October 27, 1904; 122 years ago
- Accessible: Yes (Transfer accessible to BMT Broadway Line, IRT Broadway–Seventh Avenue Line, and IRT Flushing Line platforms only)
- Former/other names: 42 Street
Services
Preceding station	New York City Subway	Following station
Terminus	42nd Street	Grand Central S Terminus
Non-revenue services and lines
Preceding station	New York City Subway	Following station
50th Street Broadway–7th local	no service	
Track layout
Station service legend
Symbol	Description
Stops all times except late nights	Stops all times except late nights

The Times Square station on the 42nd Street Shuttle consists of an island platform between tracks 1 and 4, which was completed in 2021. It is 28 feet (8.5 m) wide and is 360 feet (110 m) long, with a slight northward curve at the western end. At the east end of the platform is a passageway to the 42nd Street–Bryant Park station, running between tracks 1 and 4. The 42nd Street Shuttle serves the station at all times except between approximately midnight and 6:00 a.m., when the shuttle does not run. The next station to the east is Grand Central.

The island platform replaced a layout dating from the original IRT subway, completed in 1904. It was originally a four-track local stop with two side platforms outside the local tracks. Most of the wall along the side platform for track 1 was removed in 1914 to provide a connection to the new Times Square station on the IRT Broadway–Seventh Avenue Line. An underpass formerly connected the original side platforms. In 1918, the southbound express track (formerly track 2) was removed and replaced by a temporary wooden platform for access to the original northbound express track (formerly track 3). Track 3's wooden platform was subsequently replaced by a more permanent platform, while the old local platforms still served tracks 1 and 4. Track 3 was taken out of service on November 7, 2020, and was replaced with the island platform.

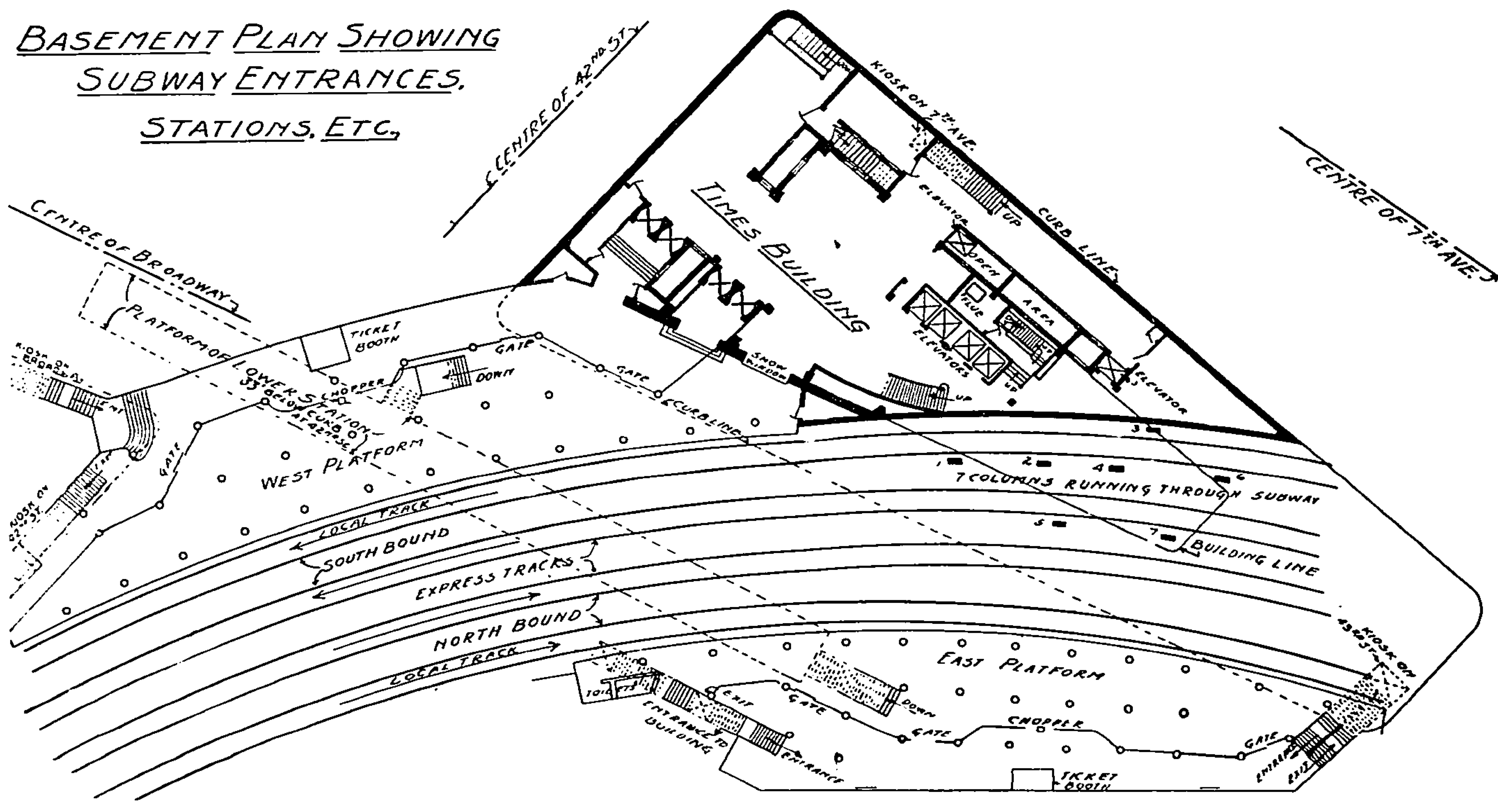
Plan of the original station before reconfiguration

The old platforms were connected on the west (railroad north) side. A movable walkway crossed track 4, the former northbound local track; the walkway could be temporarily removed to allow access to and from that track. Because of the curvature on the platforms, gap fillers under the platforms were used on tracks 1 and 3. These two platforms were concave and curved toward the shuttle trains. Track 1 was 295 feet (89.9 m) long and track 3 was 285 feet (86.9 m) long. Track 4 did not have gap fillers because of the convex curve of the platform, curving away from the shuttle trains. The platform serving Track 4 was only 150 feet (45.7 m) long, and could barely fit the three 51.4-foot-long (15.7 m) cars of the shuttle.

=== Design ===
As with other stations built as part of the original IRT, the station was constructed using a cut-and-cover method. The tunnel is covered by a U-shaped trough that contains utility pipes and wires. This trough contains a foundation of concrete no less than 4 inches (100 mm) thick. Each platform consists of 3-inch-thick (7.6 cm) concrete slabs, beneath which are drainage basins. The platform next to track 1 contain circular Doric columns spaced every 15 feet (4.6 m). Prior to the 2019–2022 reconstruction, there were additional columns between the tracks and on track 3's platform, spaced every 5 feet (1.5 m), which supported the jack-arched concrete station roofs. The renovation removed or relocated many of these columns so they are spaced at wider intervals, and an island platform was built atop tracks 2 and 3. There is a 1-inch (25 mm) gap between the trough wall and the platform walls, which are made of 4-inch (100 mm)-thick brick covered over by a tiled finish.

The original decorative scheme for the side platforms consisted of blue tile station-name tablets, blue and pink tile bands, multicolored tile pilasters, a buff faience cornice, and buff faience plaques. The mosaic tiles at all original IRT stations were manufactured by the American Encaustic Tile Company, which subcontracted the installations at each station. The decorative work was performed by faience contractor Grueby Faience Company. The former southbound local platform (serving track 1) still has a vestiges of a doorway to the Knickerbocker Hotel, while the former northbound local platform (which once served track 4) retains a former doorway to the Times Building. Small sections of the original wall remained before the station's reconstruction, with brick wainscoting capped by a marble band and white tiles. The platform also has cooling fans.

Post-2021 reconfiguration

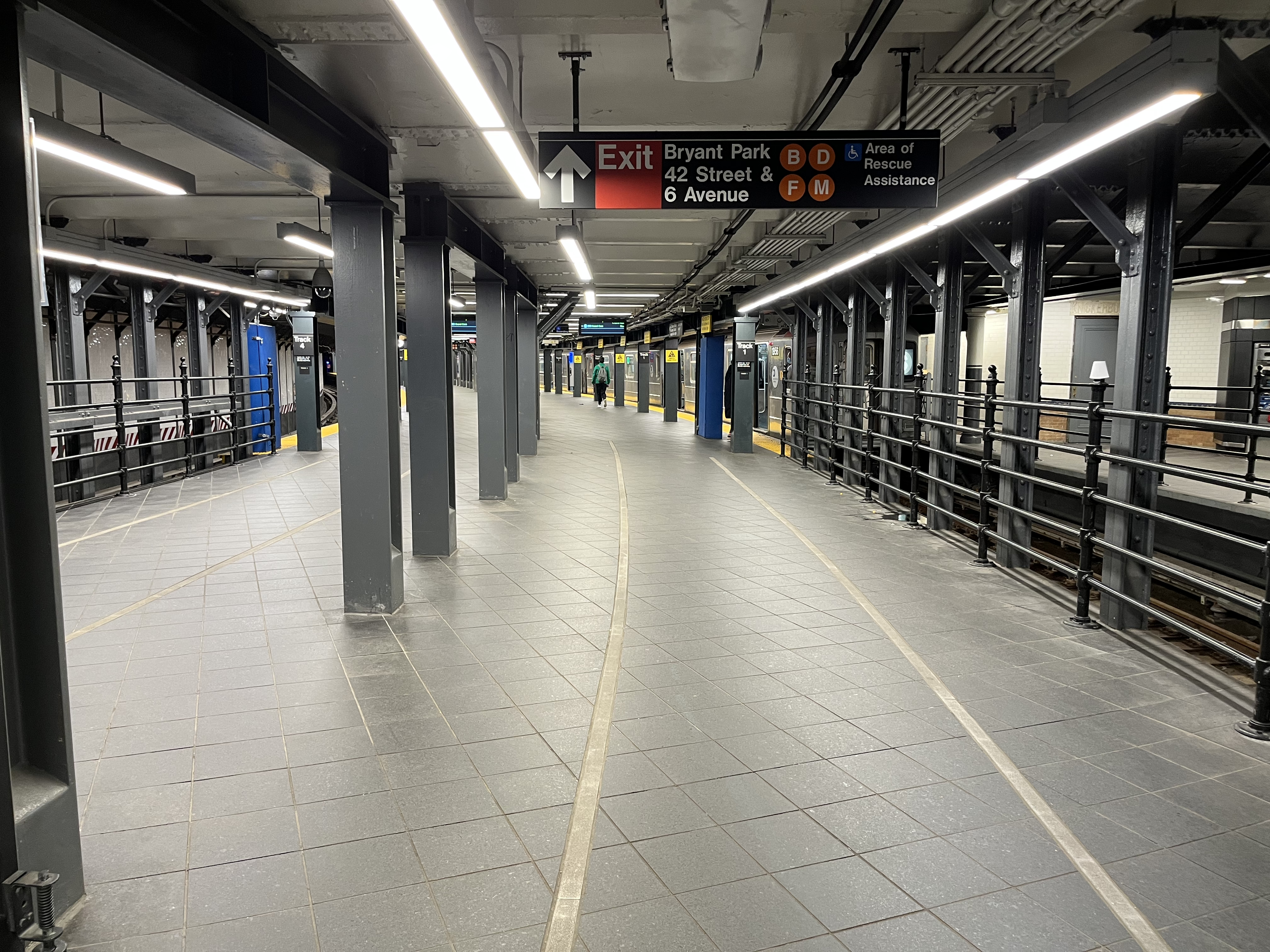
Post-Reconfiguration island platform. Concrete lines show original location of the express tracks (tracks 2 and 3)

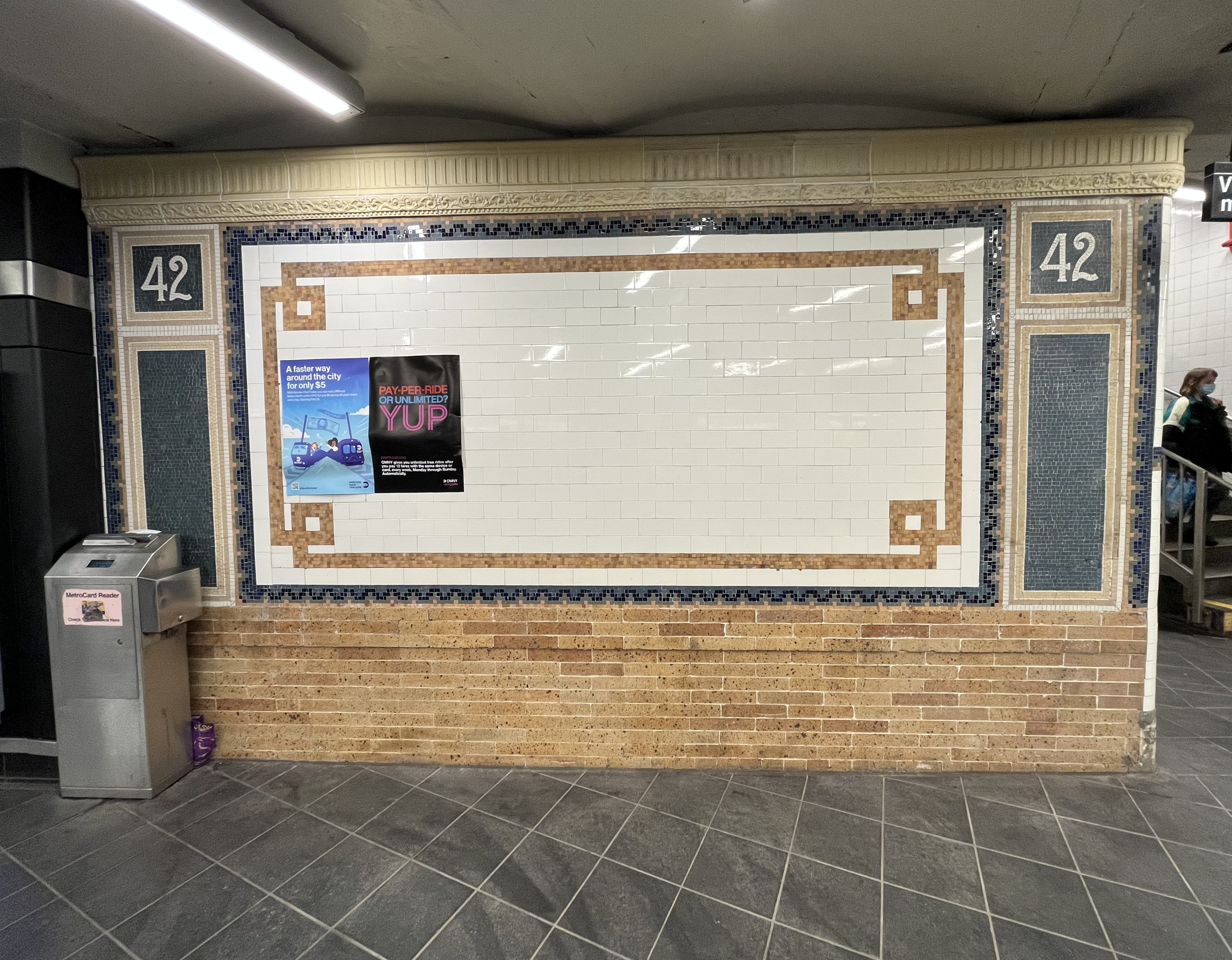
Restored section of wall dating back to the original 1904 IRT subway

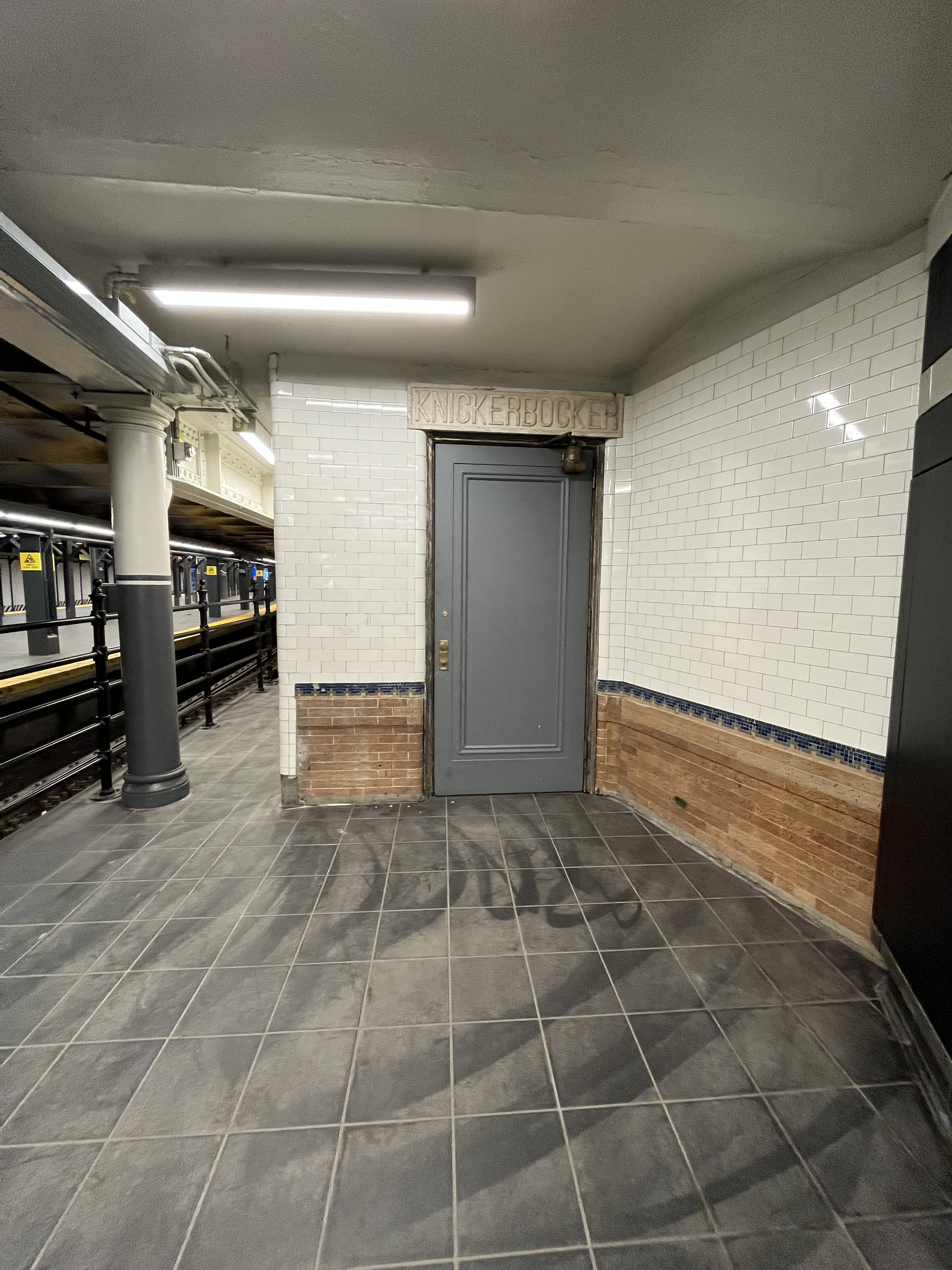
Restored Knickerbocker Hotel lintel over a doorway

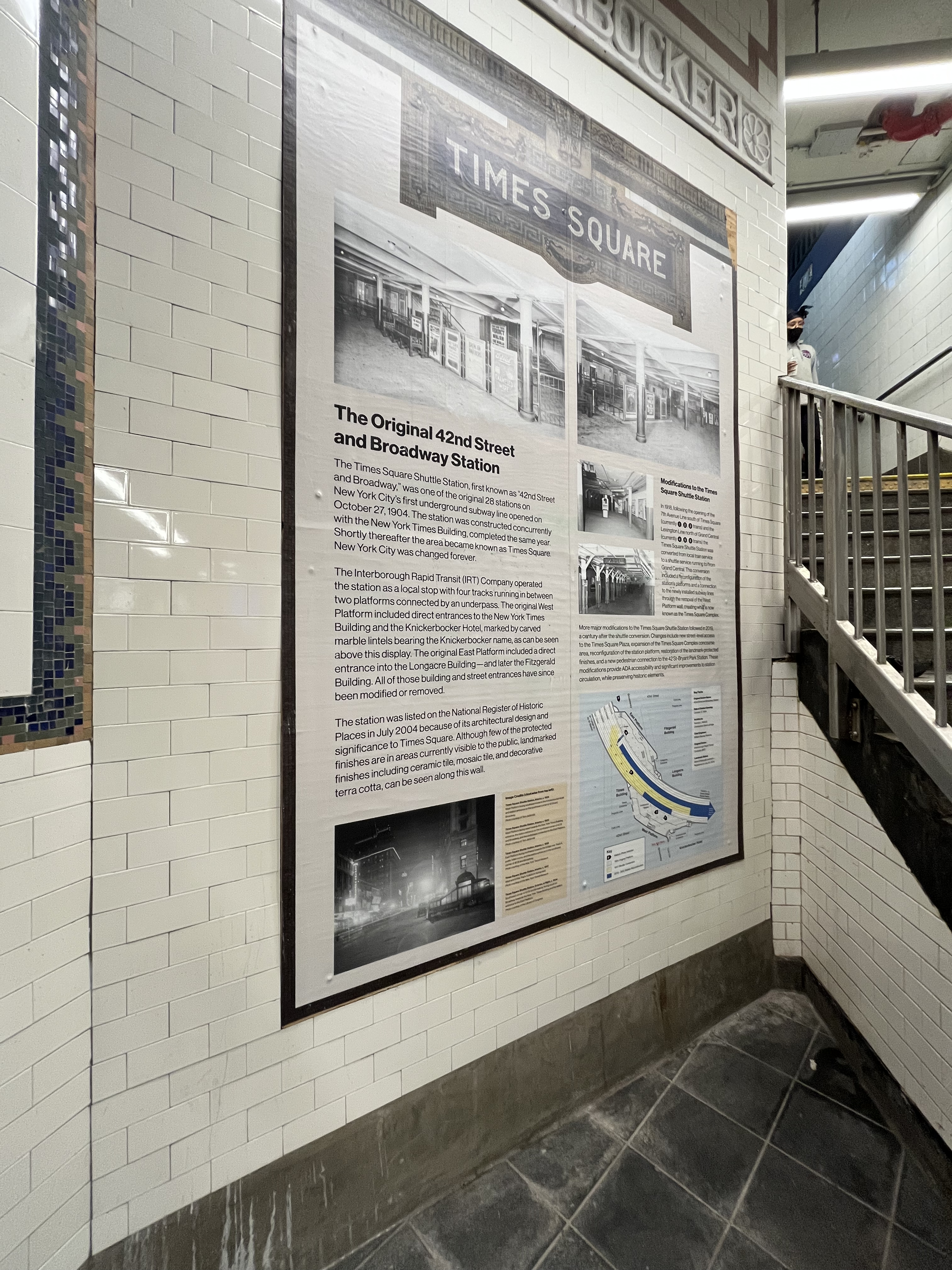
Informational sign detailing the history of the station pre 2021 reconfiguration

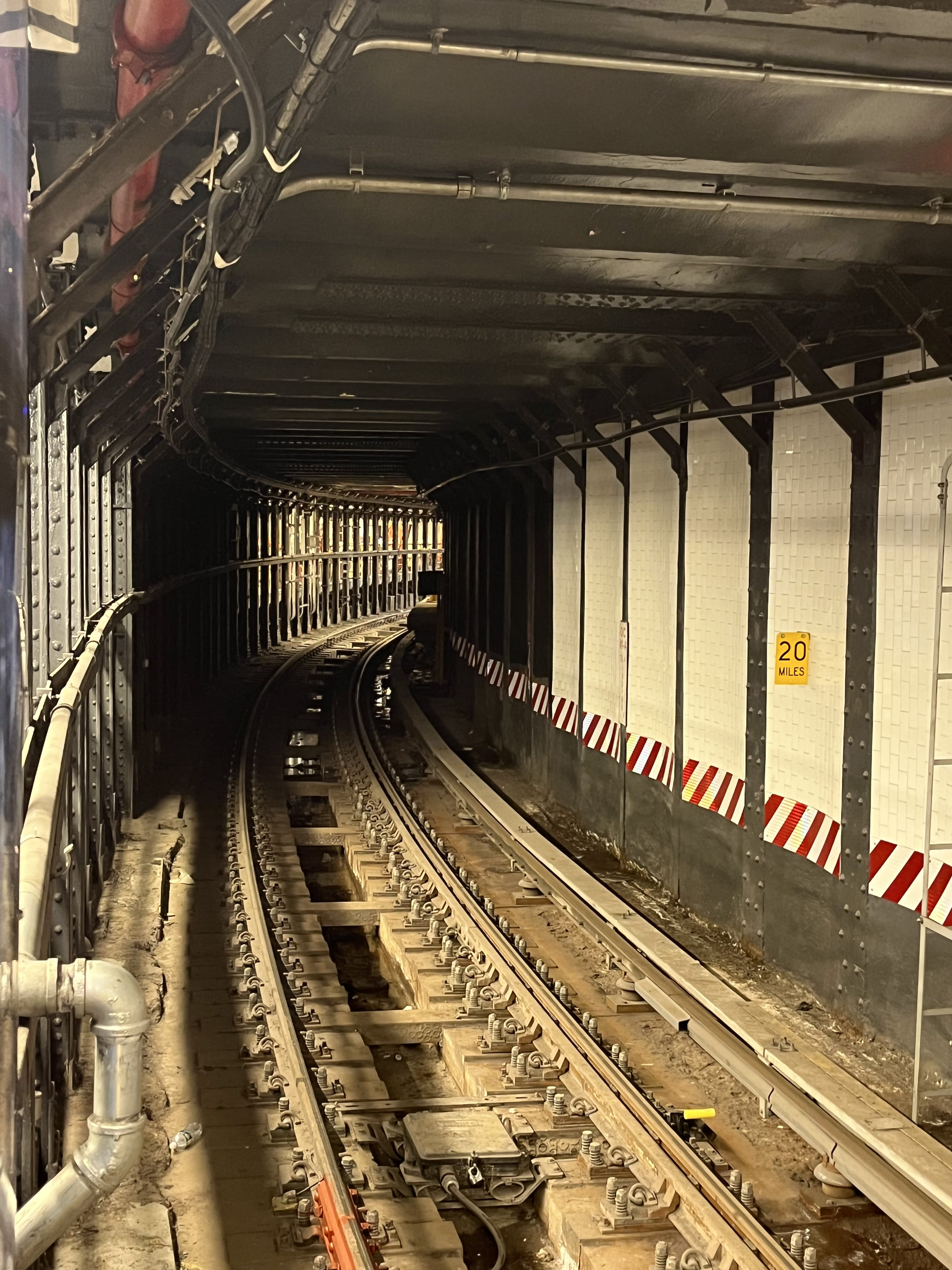
View of original 1904–2021 shuttle platform from newly reconfigured platform.

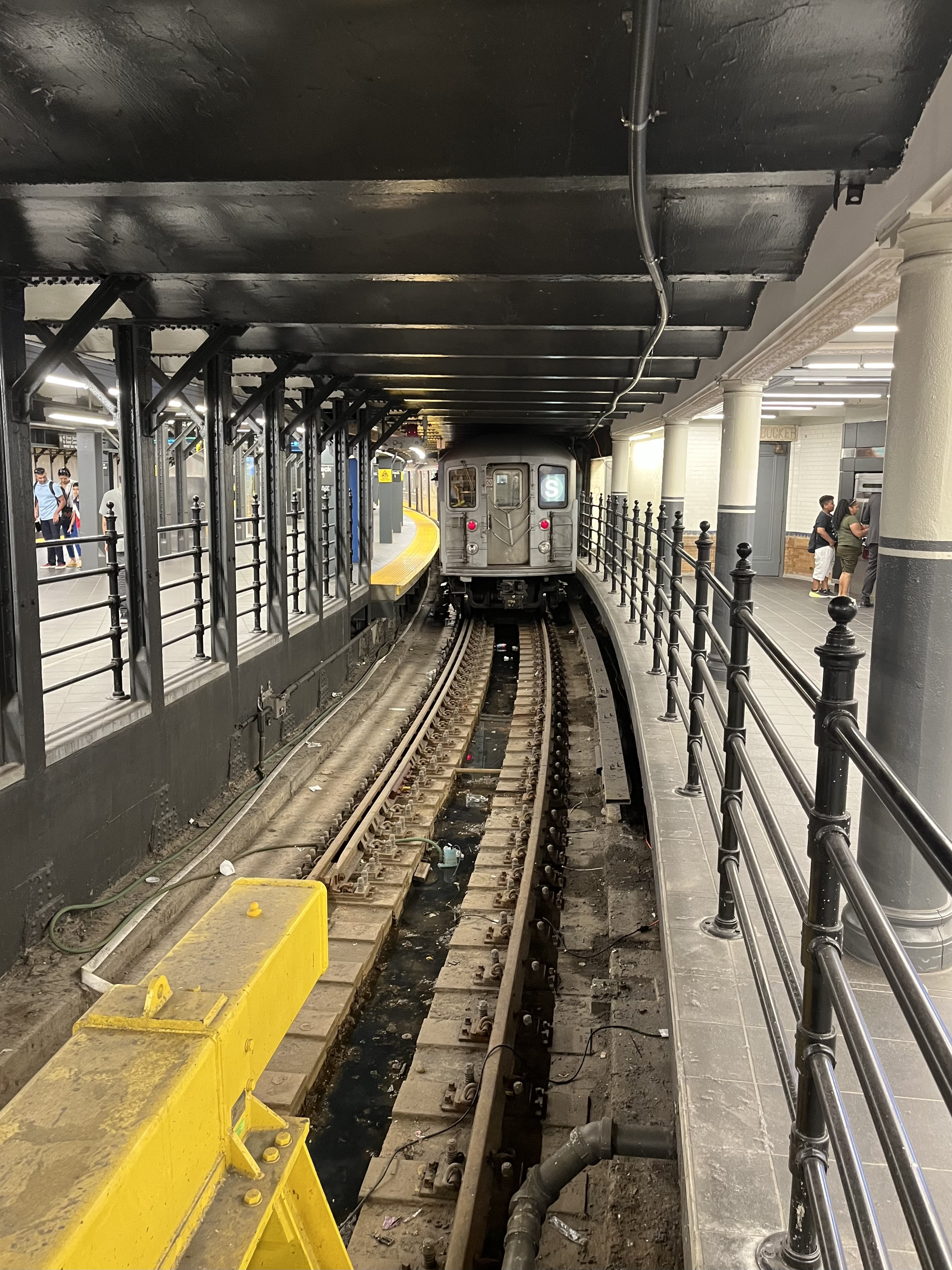
An R62A 42nd Street Shuttle train on Track 1

Pre-2021 reconfiguration

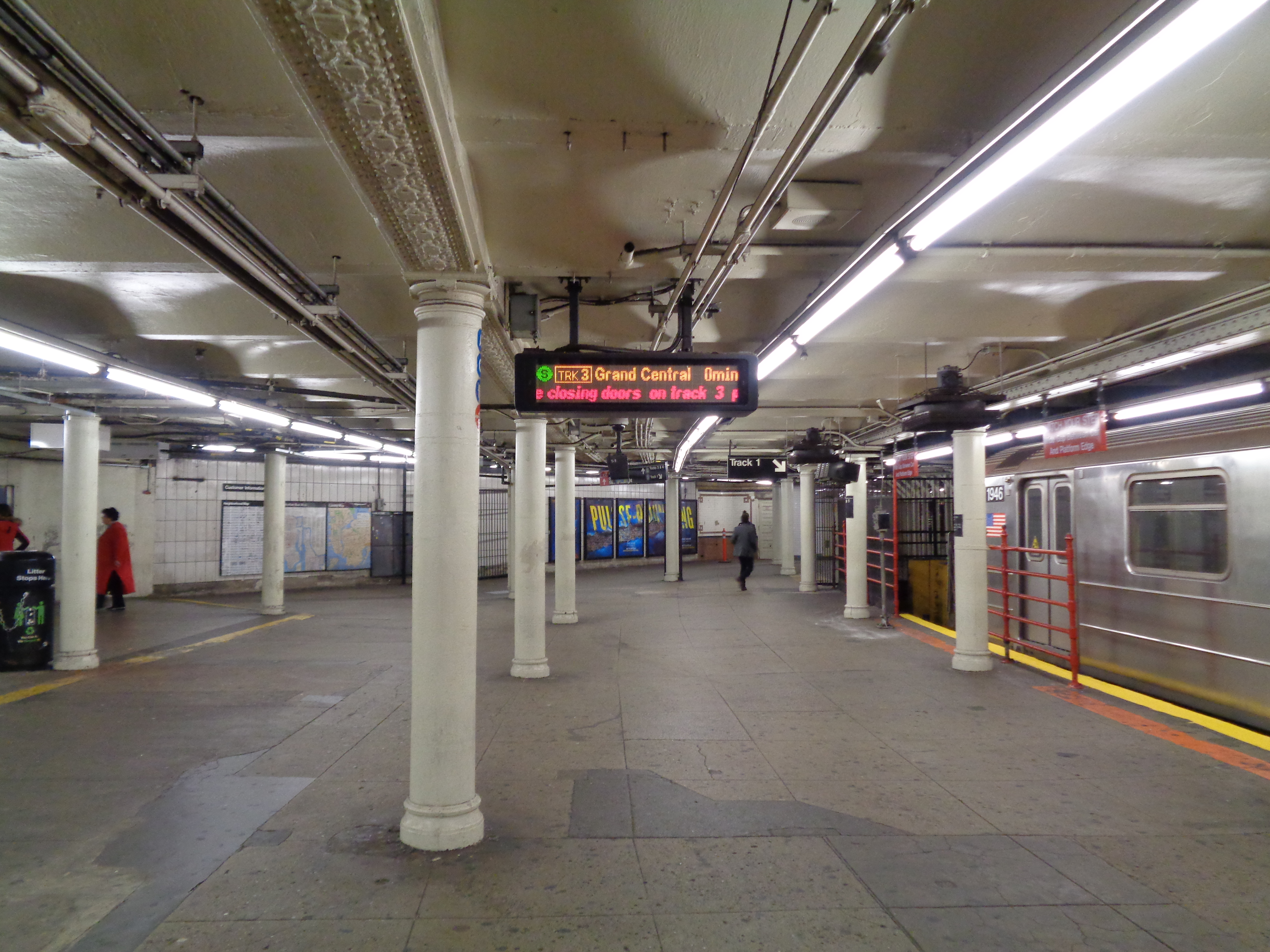
Track 1 platform, looking toward connection to other two platforms

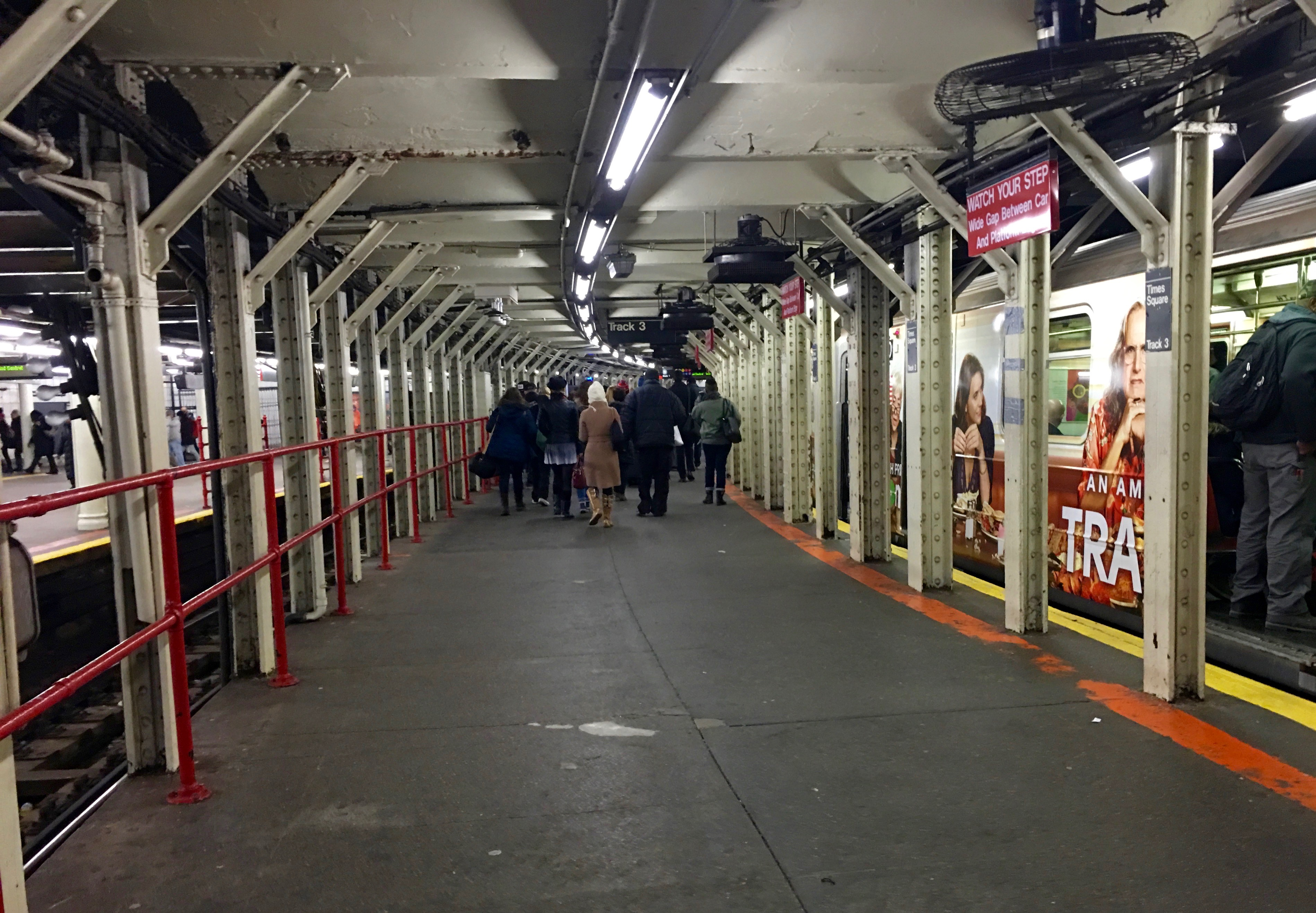
Platform for track 3, with a train on that track

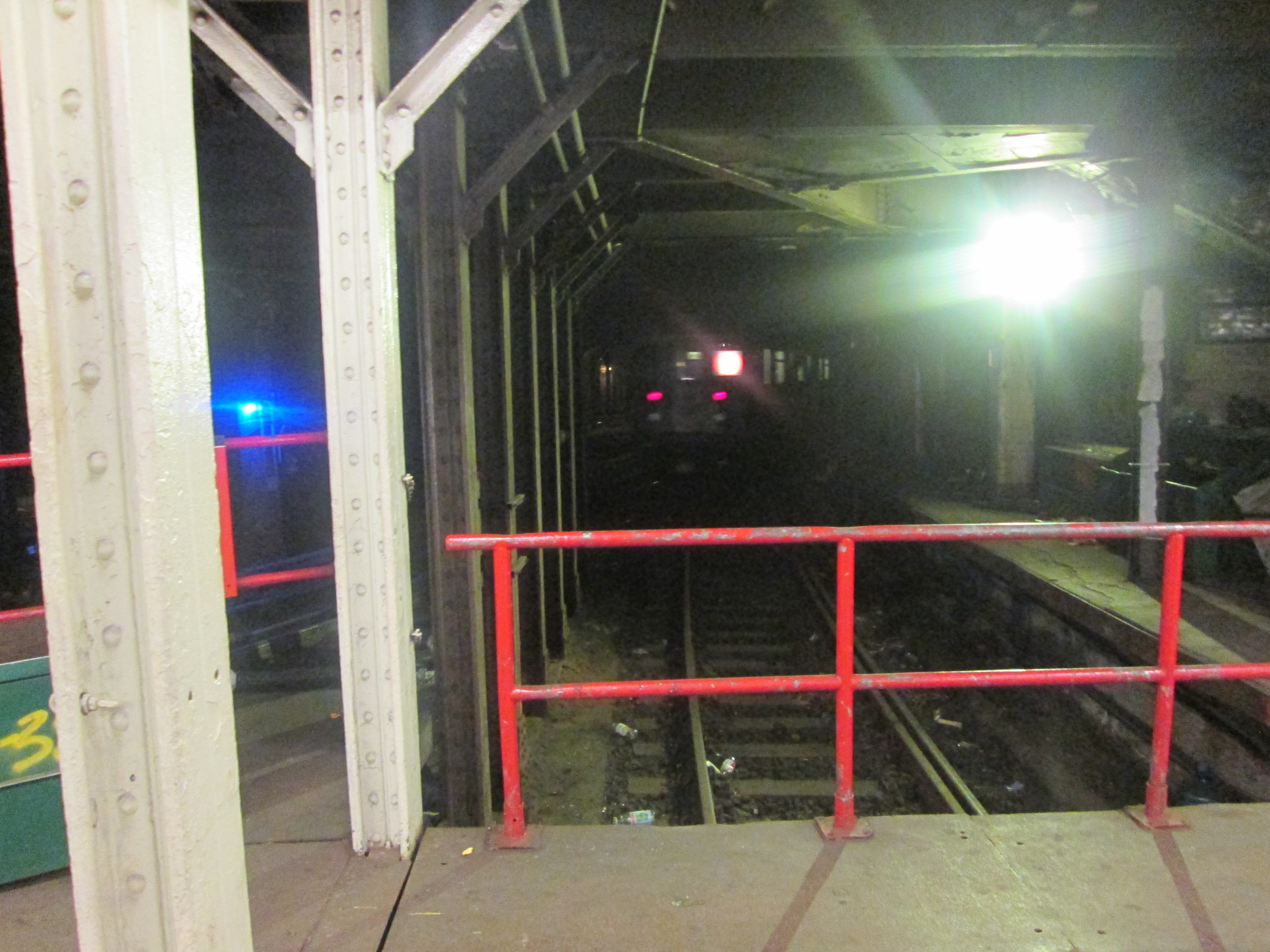
View from removable walkway over track 4, looking toward the Broadway–Seventh Avenue tunnel

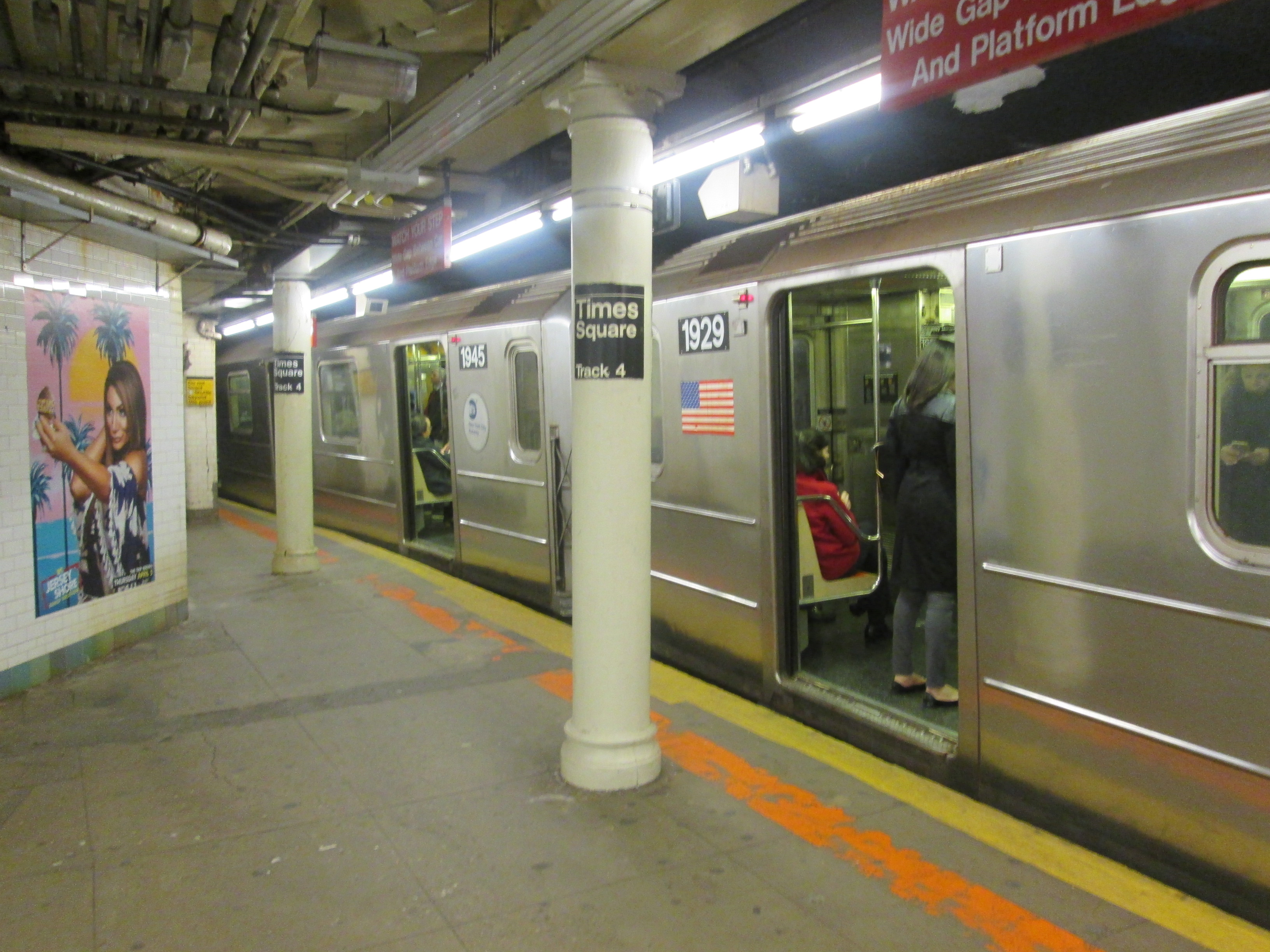
Second and third cars of a train on track 4

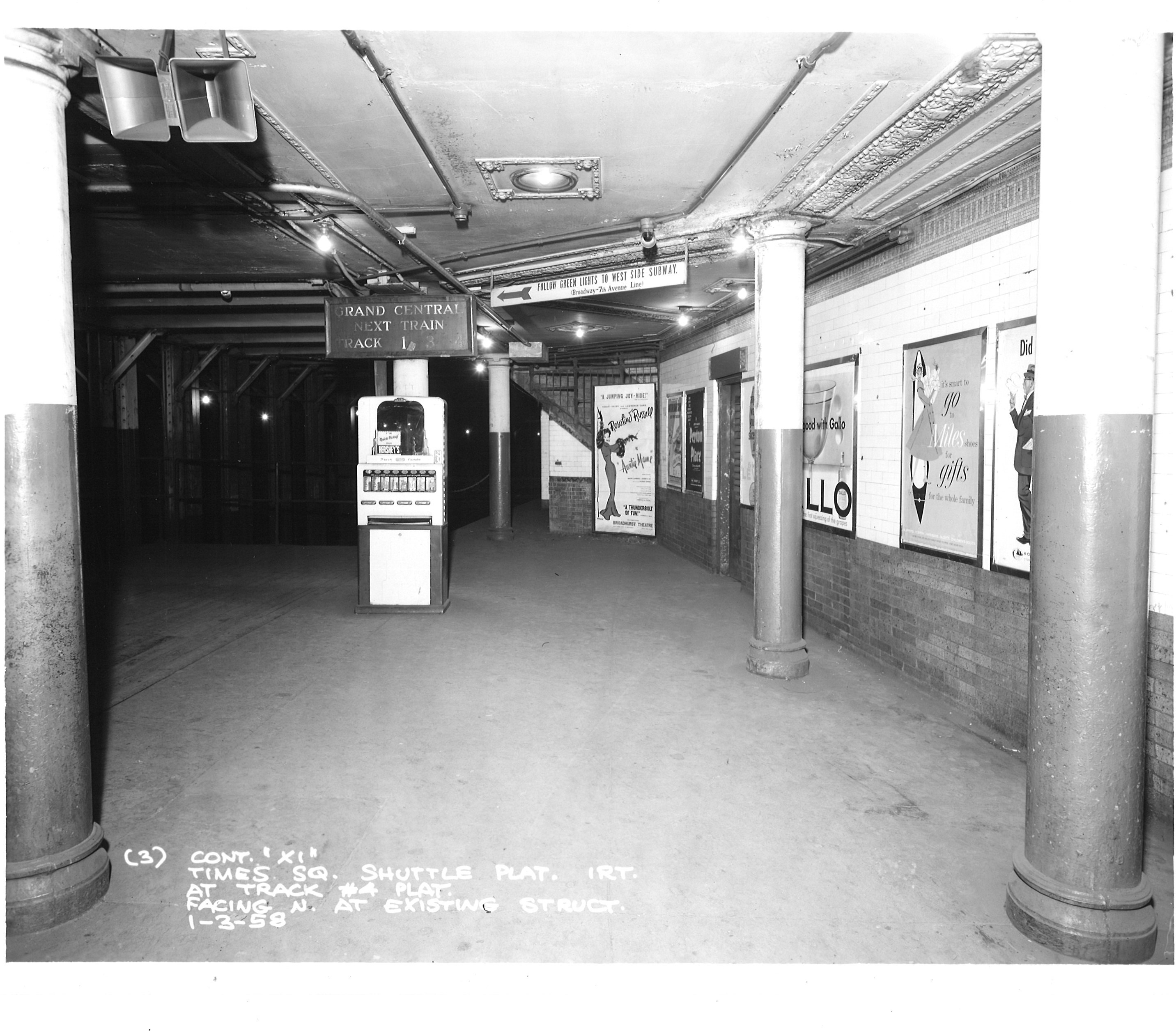
A view of the platform on Track 4 in 1958

=== Track layout ===
North of the station, track 4 merges into the northbound IRT Broadway–Seventh Avenue Line local track along the original subway alignment, north of the current Broadway–Seventh Avenue Line station. The other three tracks once curved parallel to this. Track 1 ends at a bumper block at the west end of the platform. Track 3 originally also ended at a bumper block at the west end of its platform. There is no track connection between track 4 and the other tracks anywhere along the shuttle.

== BMT Broadway Line platforms ==
Times Square–42 Street
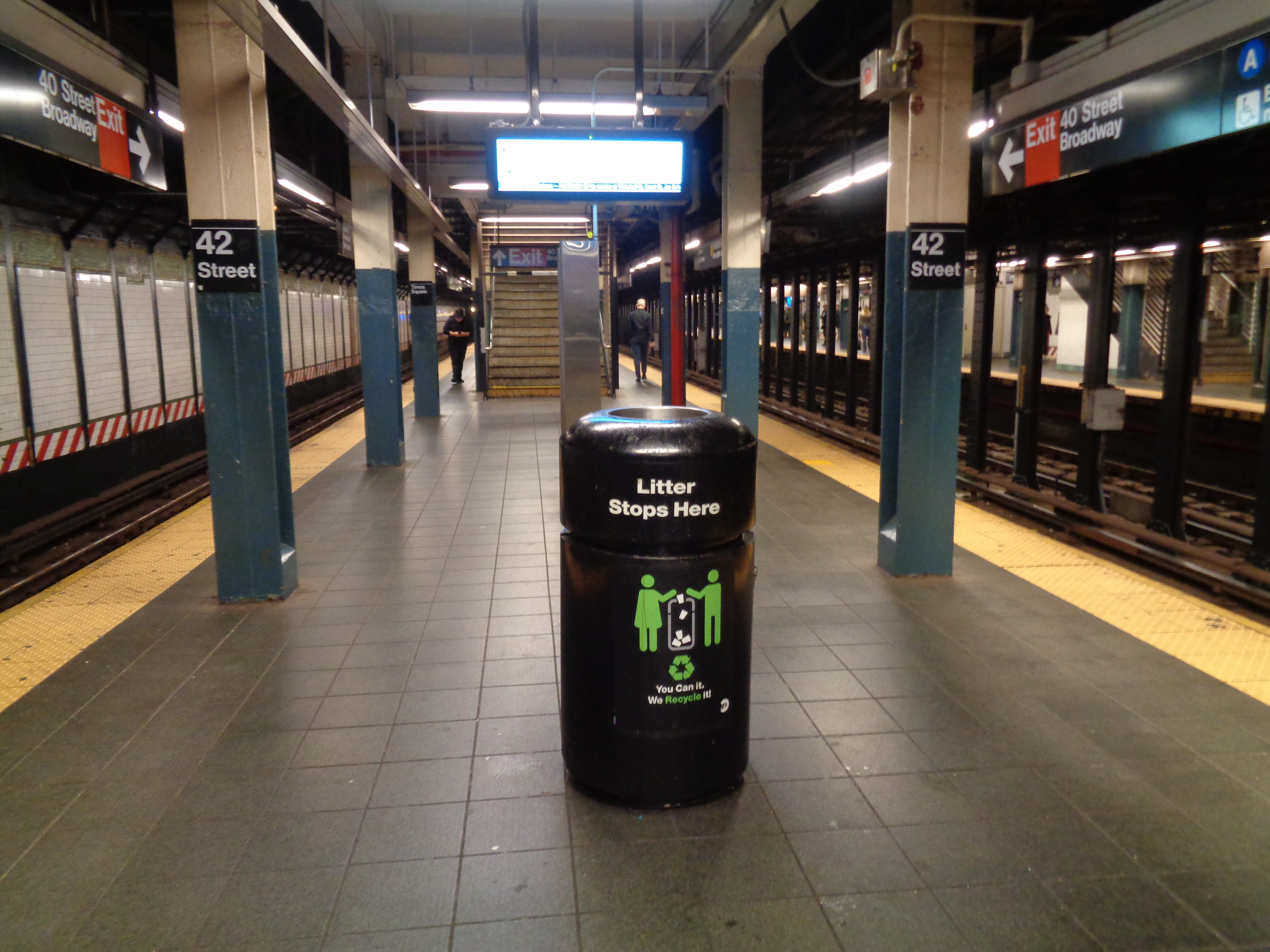
- Uptown platform

Station statistics
- Division: B (BMT)
- Line: BMT Broadway Line
- Services: N (all times); Q (all times); R (all except late nights); W (weekdays only)
- Structure: Underground
- Platforms: 2 island platforms cross-platform interchange
- Tracks: 4

Other information
- Opened: January 5, 1918; 108 years ago
- Accessible: Yes (Transfer accessible to IRT 42nd Street Shuttle, IRT Broadway–Seventh Avenue Line, and IRT Flushing Line platforms only)
Services
Preceding station	New York City Subway	Following station
57th Street–Seventh Avenue N Q toward 96th Street	Express	34th Street–Herald Square N Q R W southbound
49th Street N Q R W via Lexington Avenue–59th Street	Local	34th Street–Herald Square N Q R W southbound
Track layout
Station service legend
Symbol	Description
Stops all times except late nights	Stops all times except late nights
Stops all times	Stops all times
Stops weekdays during the day	Stops weekdays during the day
Stops weekends during the day	Stops weekends during the day

The Times Square–42nd Street station on the BMT Broadway Line is an express station, with four tracks and two island platforms. The N and Q both stop here at all times, the R stops here except at night, and the W stops here only on weekdays during the day. The local tracks are used by N, R and W trains, while the express tracks are used by Q trains during the day as well as limited N trains during rush hours. During the night, the Q uses the local tracks. The next station to the north is 49th Street for local trains and 57th Street–Seventh Avenue for express trains, while the next station to the south is 34th Street–Herald Square for all service.

Two stairs and one elevator from each platform ascend to the primary mezzanine. At the far south end of each platform, two stairs ascend to the southern BMT mezzanine. Near the center of the southbound platform, a set of stairs rises to the 41st Street corridor of the primary mezzanine.

The tunnel is covered by a U-shaped trough that contains utility pipes and wires. The bottom of this trough contains a concrete foundation no less than 4 inches (100 mm) thick. Each platform consists of 3-inch-thick (7.6 cm) concrete slabs, beneath which are drainage basins. The platforms contain I-beam columns spaced every 15 feet (4.6 m). Additional columns between the tracks, spaced every 5 feet (1.5 m), support the jack-arched concrete station roofs. The trackside walls also contain exposed I-beam columns, dividing the trackside walls into 5 foot (1.5 m) wide panels. The panels on the trackside walls consist of white square ceramic tiles. A frieze with multicolored geometric patterns runs atop the trackside walls, and a plaque with a framed white "42" tile is placed inside the frieze every 15 feet (4.6 m). The walls at the south ends of the platforms are untiled.

The express tracks north of the station spread out to pass around a crossunder in the Times Square shuttle platforms. This crossunder was sealed off in the 1960s.

== IRT Broadway–Seventh Avenue Line platforms ==
Times Square–42 Street
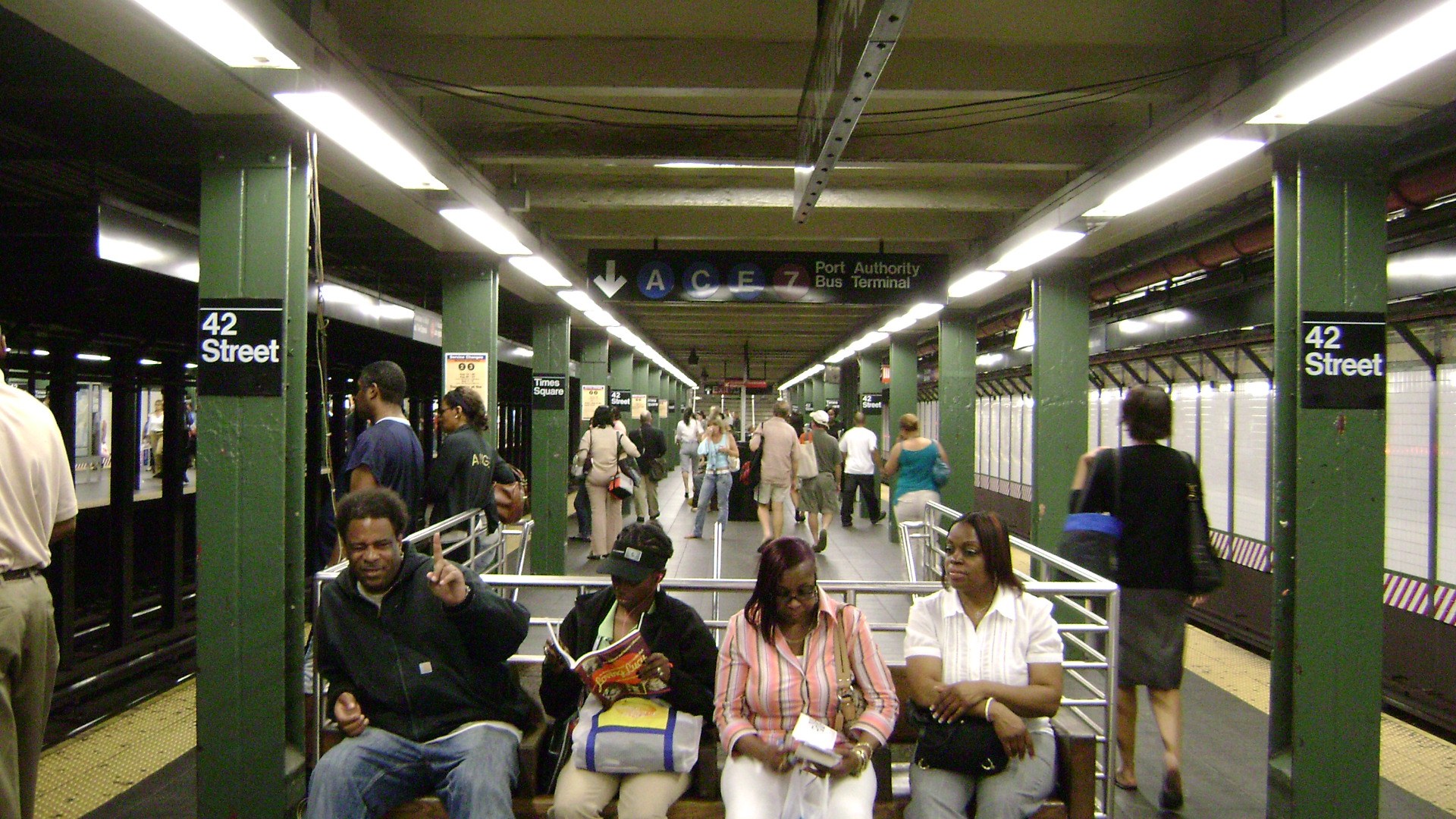
- Downtown platform

Station statistics
- Division: A (IRT)
- Line: IRT Broadway–Seventh Avenue Line
- Services: 1 (all times); 2 (all times); 3 (all times)
- Structure: Underground
- Platforms: 2 island platforms cross-platform interchange
- Tracks: 4

Other information
- Opened: June 3, 1917; 109 years ago
- Rebuilt: 1998–2002
- Accessible: Yes (Transfer accessible to BMT Broadway Line, IRT 42nd Street Shuttle, and IRT Flushing Line platforms only)
Services
Preceding station	New York City Subway	Following station
72nd Street 2 3 via 135th Street	Express	34th Street–Penn Station 1 2 3 southbound
50th Street 1 2 toward Van Cortlandt Park–242nd Street	Local	34th Street–Penn Station 1 2 3 southbound
Track layout
Station service legend
Symbol	Description
Stops all times except late nights	Stops all times except late nights
Stops all times	Stops all times
Stops late nights only	Stops late nights only

The Times Square–42nd Street station on the IRT Broadway–Seventh Avenue Line is an express station, with four tracks and two island platforms. The 1, 2, and 3 trains stop here at all times. The 1 always makes local stops and the 3 always makes express stops. The 2 makes express stops during the day and local stops during the night. The next station to the north is 50th Street for local trains and 72nd Street for express trains. The next station to the south is 34th Street–Penn Station for all service.

The platforms are 510 feet (160 m) long, and were extended to the south in 1959. Stairways to the other lines are provided at the northern end and in the center of each platform; two stairways from each platform lead to the lower mezzanine level while the remainder lead to mezzanines above the platforms. An elevator leads from each platform to the upper mezzanine; the southbound elevator also leads to the lower mezzanine and the Flushing Line platform.

The tunnel is covered by a U-shaped trough that contains utility pipes and wires. The bottom of this trough contains a concrete foundation no less than 4 inches (100 mm) thick. Each platform consists of 3-inch-thick (7.6 cm) concrete slabs, beneath which are drainage basins. The platforms contain I-beam columns spaced every 15 feet (4.6 m). Additional columns between the tracks, spaced every 5 feet (1.5 m), support the jack-arched concrete station roofs. The trackside walls also contain exposed I-beam columns, dividing the trackside walls into 5 foot (1.5 m) wide panels. The panels on the trackside walls consist of white square ceramic tiles. A frieze with multicolored geometric patterns runs atop the trackside walls, and a plaque with a stylized "T" is placed inside the frieze at intervals of every three panels.

Just south of the station, a fifth center track begins, formed by a connection from each express track. This track merges back into the two express tracks just before 34th Street–Penn Station. This center track was used in the past for turning rush hour "Gap Trains", which would head back up north.

== IRT Flushing Line platform ==
Times Square–42 Street
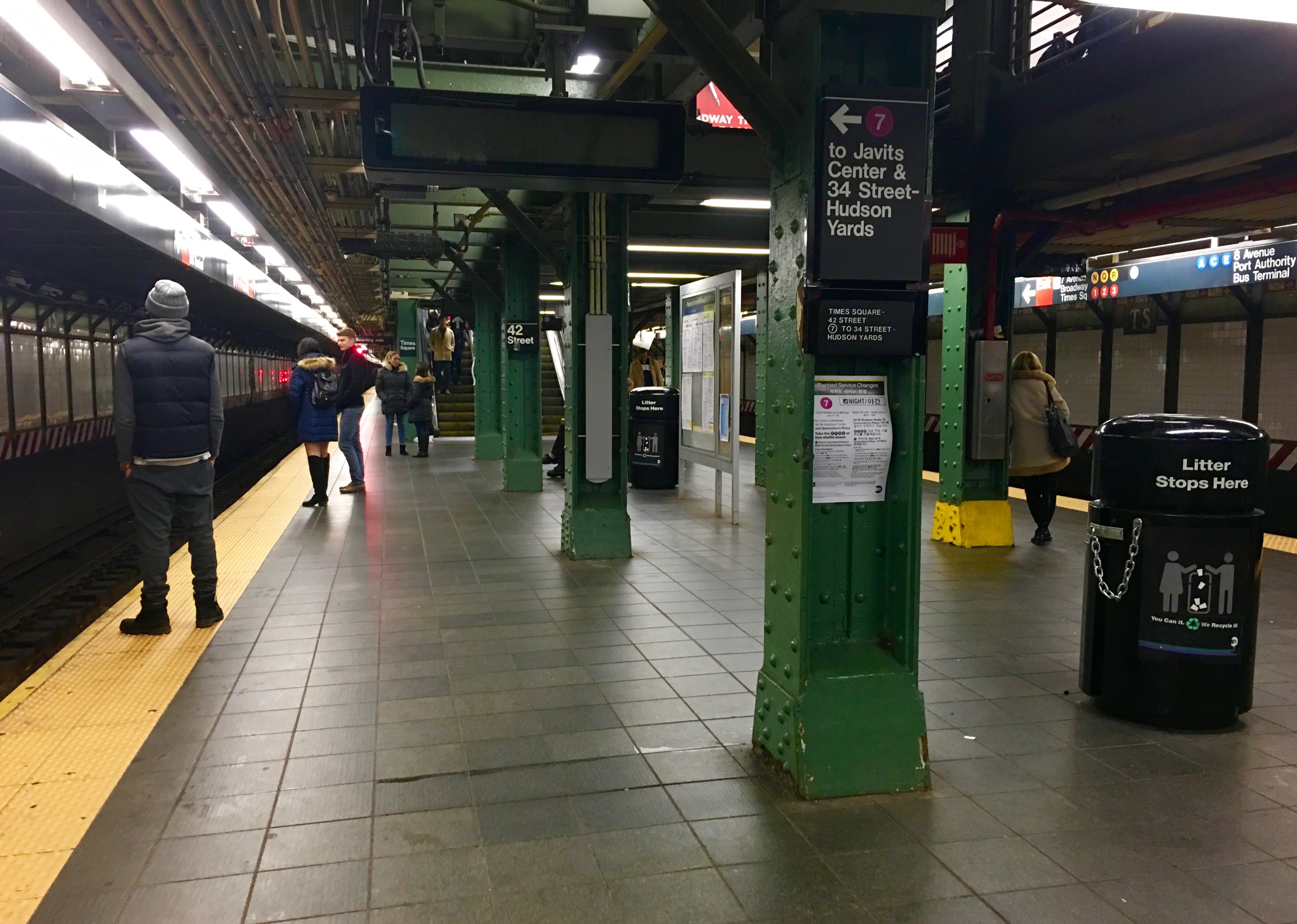
- The IRT Flushing Line platform

Station statistics
- Division: A (IRT)
- Line: IRT Flushing Line
- Services: 7 (all times) <7> (rush hours until 9:30 p.m., peak direction)
- Structure: Underground
- Platforms: 1 island platform
- Tracks: 2

Other information
- Opened: March 14, 1927; 99 years ago
- Accessible: Yes (Transfer accessible to BMT Broadway Line, IRT 42nd Street Shuttle, and IRT Broadway–Seventh Avenue Line platforms only)
Services
Preceding station	New York City Subway	Following station
34th Street–Hudson Yards 7 <7> Terminus	7 (New York City Subway service)	Fifth Avenue 7 <7> toward Flushing–Main Street
Track layout
Station service legend
Symbol	Description
Stops all times	Stops all times
Stops rush hours in the peak direction only	Stops rush hours in the peak direction only

The Times Square–42nd Street station on the IRT Flushing Line has one island platform and two tracks, located deep below West 41st Street. The 7 train stops here at all times, and the <7> train stops here during rush hours in the peak direction. The station is between 34th Street–Hudson Yards to the west and Fifth Avenue to the east. Stairs, escalators, and an elevator along the platform lead to various mezzanines.

The platform consists of 3-inch-thick (7.6 cm) concrete slabs, beneath which are drainage basins. The platform contains I-beam columns spaced every 15 feet (4.6 m). Large H-section columns, supporting horizontal I-beams, also support the tall ceilings of the Flushing Line station. Above the escalators, X-supports and diagonally braced lateral beams also support the ceiling. The trackside walls also contain exposed I-beam columns, dividing the trackside walls into 5 foot (1.5 m) wide panels. The panels on the trackside walls consist of white square ceramic tiles. A frieze with multicolored geometric patterns runs atop the trackside walls, and a plaque with a framed white "TS" tile is placed inside the frieze every 15 feet (4.6 m). Similar mosaics run along the bases of the trackside walls as well.

The tracks continue south (compass west) beyond the station to the 34th Street station. These tracks formerly led to a storage and layover area, but the tracks were replaced and inspected as part of the 7 Subway Extension, and new third rail was installed. The closed lower-level platform on the IND Eighth Avenue Line was blocking the line but since removed.

== Artwork ==
=== Original artwork ===
George Lewis Heins and Christopher Grant LaFarge were the first commissioned architects of the IRT. They designed the original Times Square Station, which was located at the current Grand Central Shuttle stop. In many of their stations, Heins and LaFarge used symbolic imagery to honor a neighborhood or its namesake. When Squire Vickers took over as chief designer and architect of the IRT in 1906, he continued this tradition of using symbolism to speak to a station's history.

The colored tile trim of the IRT portions of the station closely resembles the Confederate flag. Scholars believe that Vickers and his colleagues unmistakably reference the symbol of the South to pay homage to New York Times owner Adolph S. Ochs. The Times had built a new headquarters directly above part of the subway station in 1904. After a 2010s movement in which Confederate monuments nationwide were removed, the Metropolitan Transportation Authority announced in August 2017 that these tiles would be replaced; the tiles were subsequently covered with stickers.

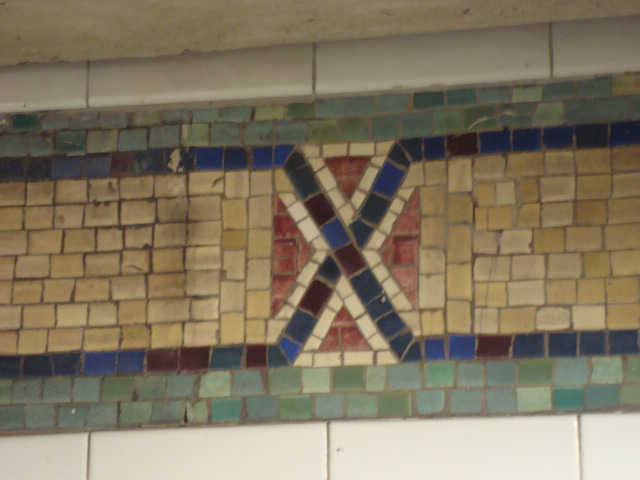
Original colored tile trim, before the station renovation of the late 1990s

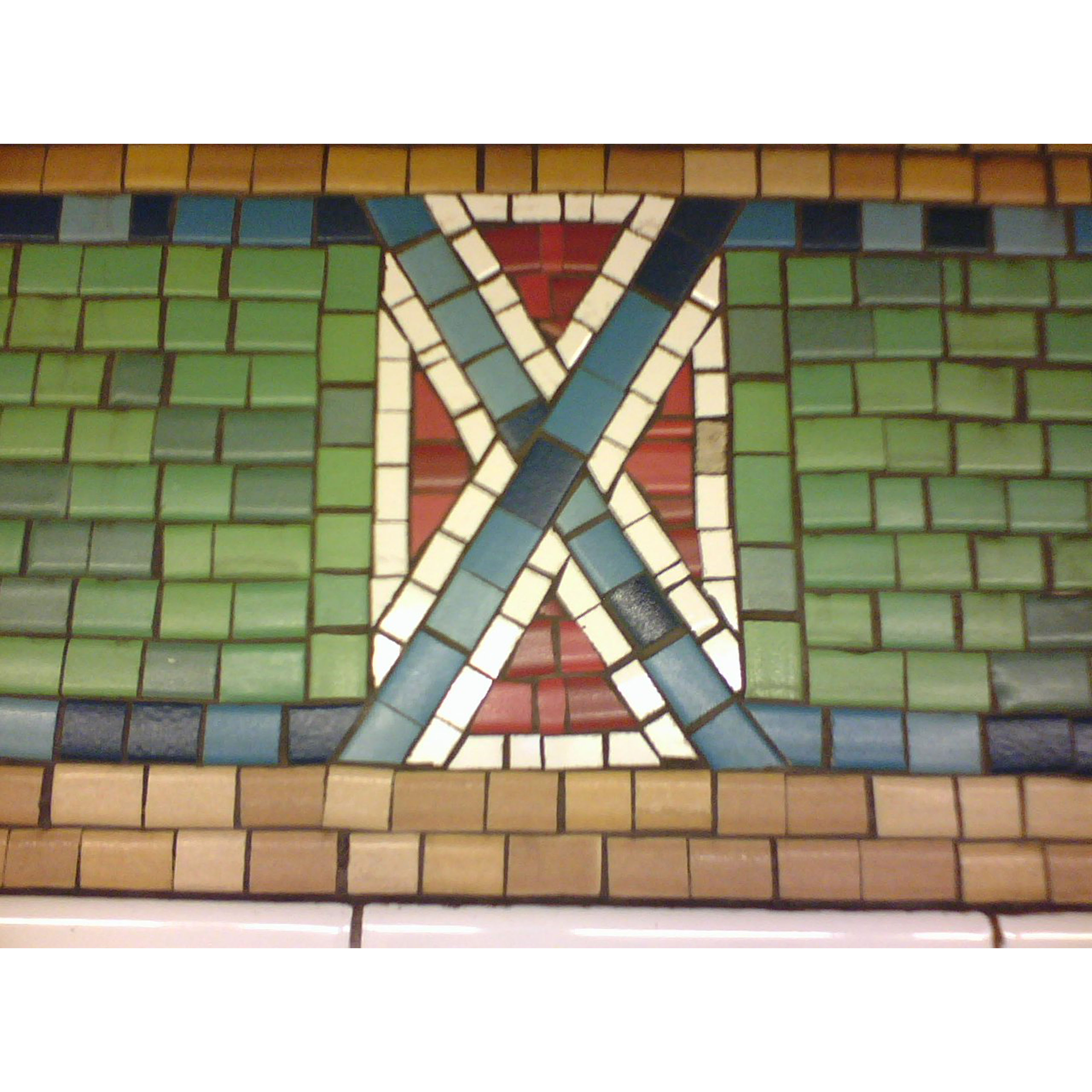
Replica of the original trim, installed in 1998

=== Commissioned artwork ===
The station complex contains several artworks commissioned as part of the MTA Arts & Design program. In 1991, Norman B. Colp created The Commuter's Lament or A Close Shave, a series of signs attached to the roof of the 41st Street passageway between Seventh and Eighth Avenues, inspired by classic Burma-Shave ads. In order, the signs read Overslept/So tired/If late/Get fired/Why bother?/Why the pain?/Just go home/Do it again. The last panel is a picture of a bed. The panels were part of an art project that was supposed to last only one year, but were never removed. The MTA also commissioned a mosaic mural by Jack Beal titled The Return of Spring (2001), which is located in the 41st Street passageway. The MTA commissioned a second mural from Beal in 2005, The Onset of Winter. They present the classical myth of Persephone set against the backdrop of the subway.

Jacob Lawrence created a mosaic mural called New York in Transit, which was installed in 2001 above the BMT mezzanine, and depicts several topics related to New York City. New York in Transit was Lawrence's last public work before his 2000 death. Near the BMT mezzanine's connection with the shuttle platform, Roy Lichtenstein created Times Square Mural, which was installed in 2002. Times Square Mural is made from porcelain enamel on steel and measures 6 by 53 feet (1.8 by 16.2 m); it depicts an elongated car traveling through a subway station. Lichtenstein died in 1997 before the mural could be installed; he had completed Times Square Mural in 1994, but installation was delayed until after the station complex's renovation. The mezzanine between 41st and 42nd Street contains the artwork Times Square Times: 35 Times by Toby Buonagurio, which was installed in 2005. The artwork consists of tiles depicting fashion, performing arts, or streetlife, which are embedded in a glass-brick wall. The mezzanine under the IRT Broadway–Seventh Avenue Line at 41st Street contains a mosaic artwork by Jane Dickson, Revelers. The mosaics depict about 70 life-size people who are moving around in groups.

The shuttle station contains the artworks Each One, Every One and Equal All, all installed in 2021 and designed by Nick Cave. Every One (2021), in the passageway between the Times Square and 42nd Street–Bryant Park stations, consists of a mosaic flanking 11 digital screens; one side of the mosaic measures 143 feet (44 m) long and the other measures 179 feet (55 m) long. The mosaic and screens both depict figures in "Soundsuits", sculptural costumes made in a variety of materials. The two other artworks are Each One at the new shuttle entrance and Equal All on the island platform.

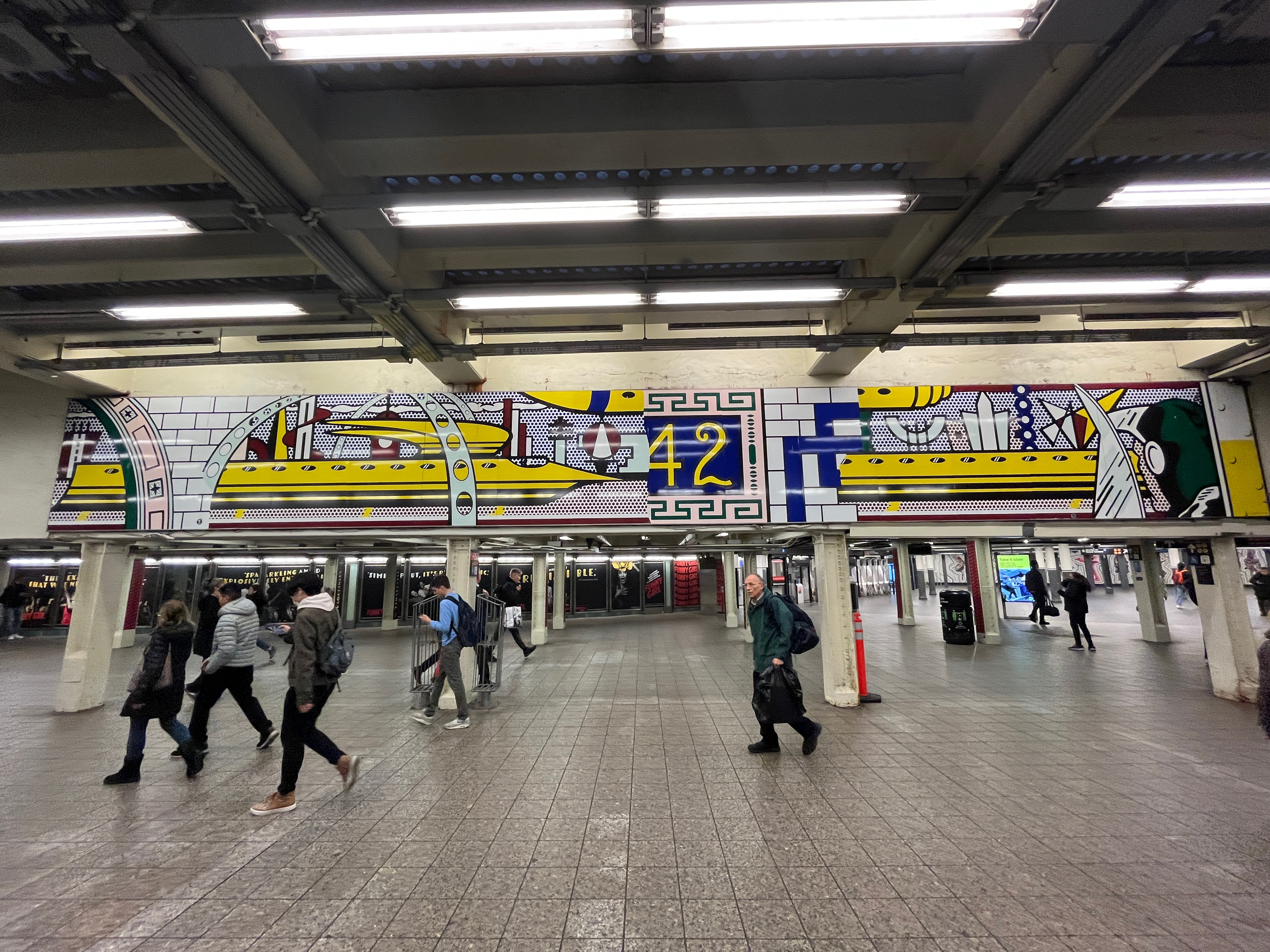
Times Square Mural

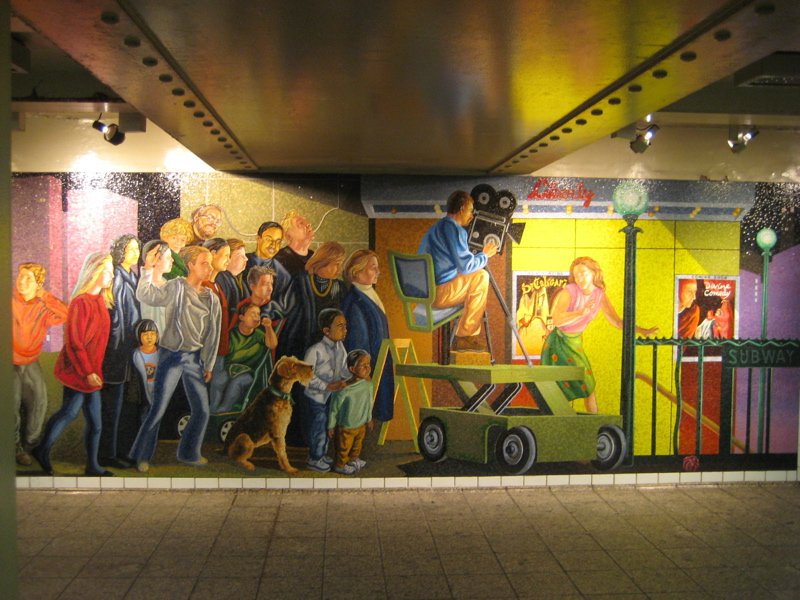
The Onset of Winter

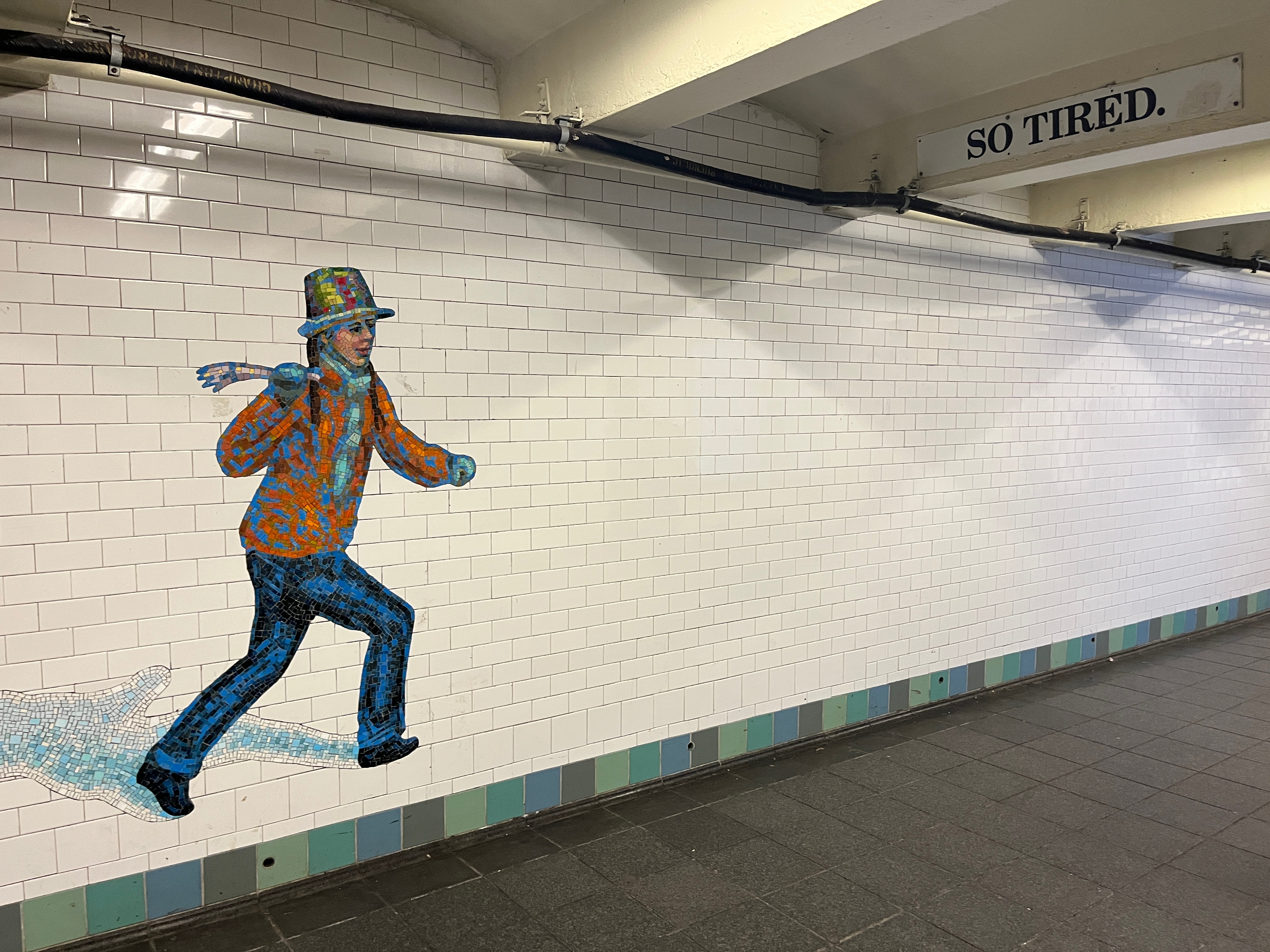
The Revelers and The Commuter's Lament

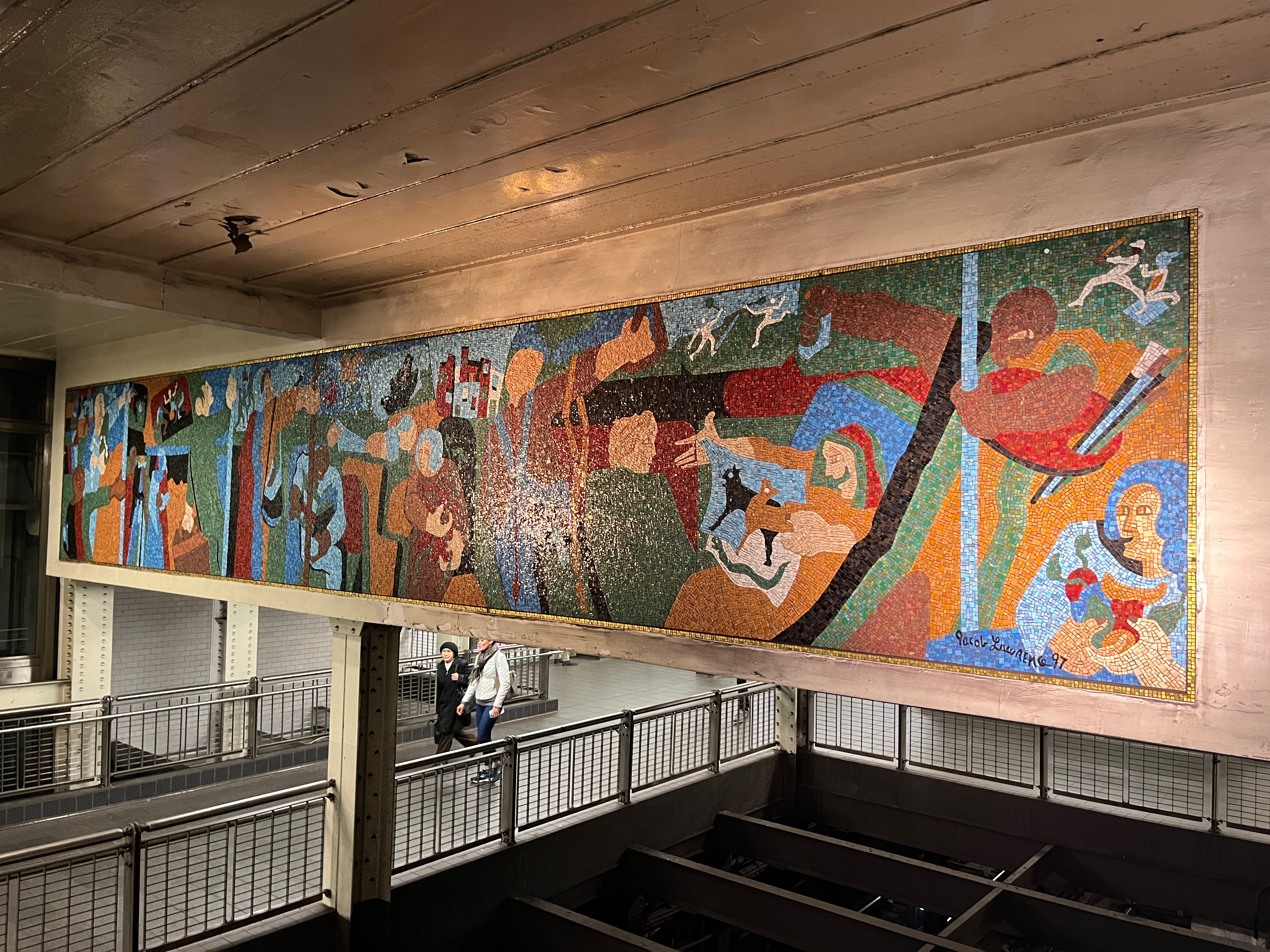
New York in Transit

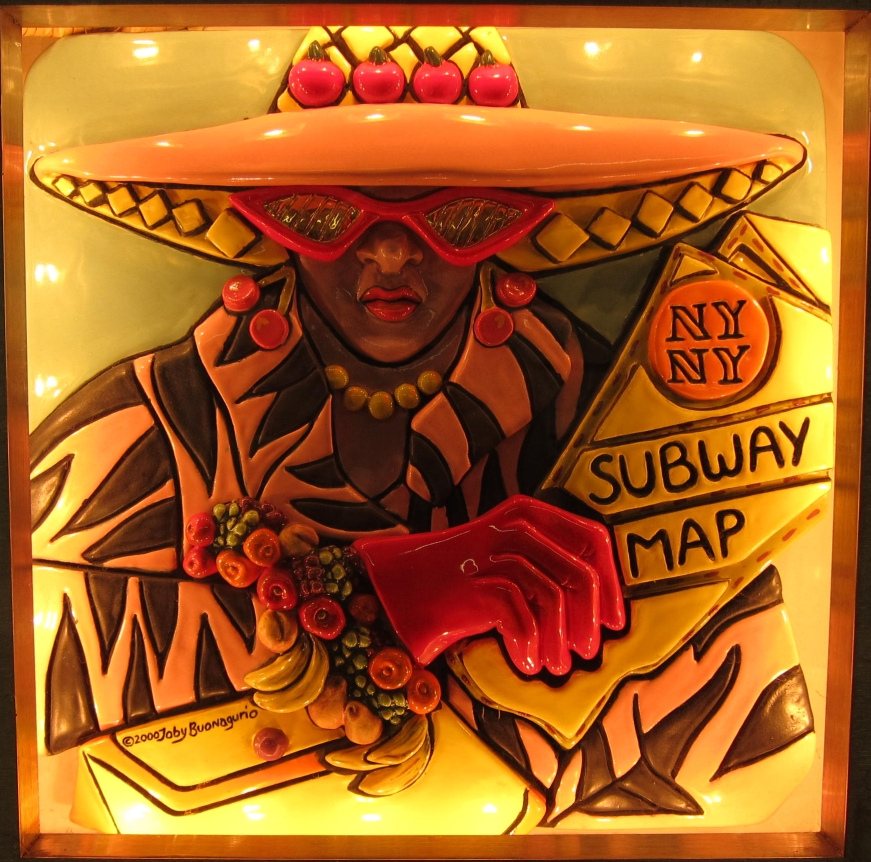
Times Square Times: 35 Times

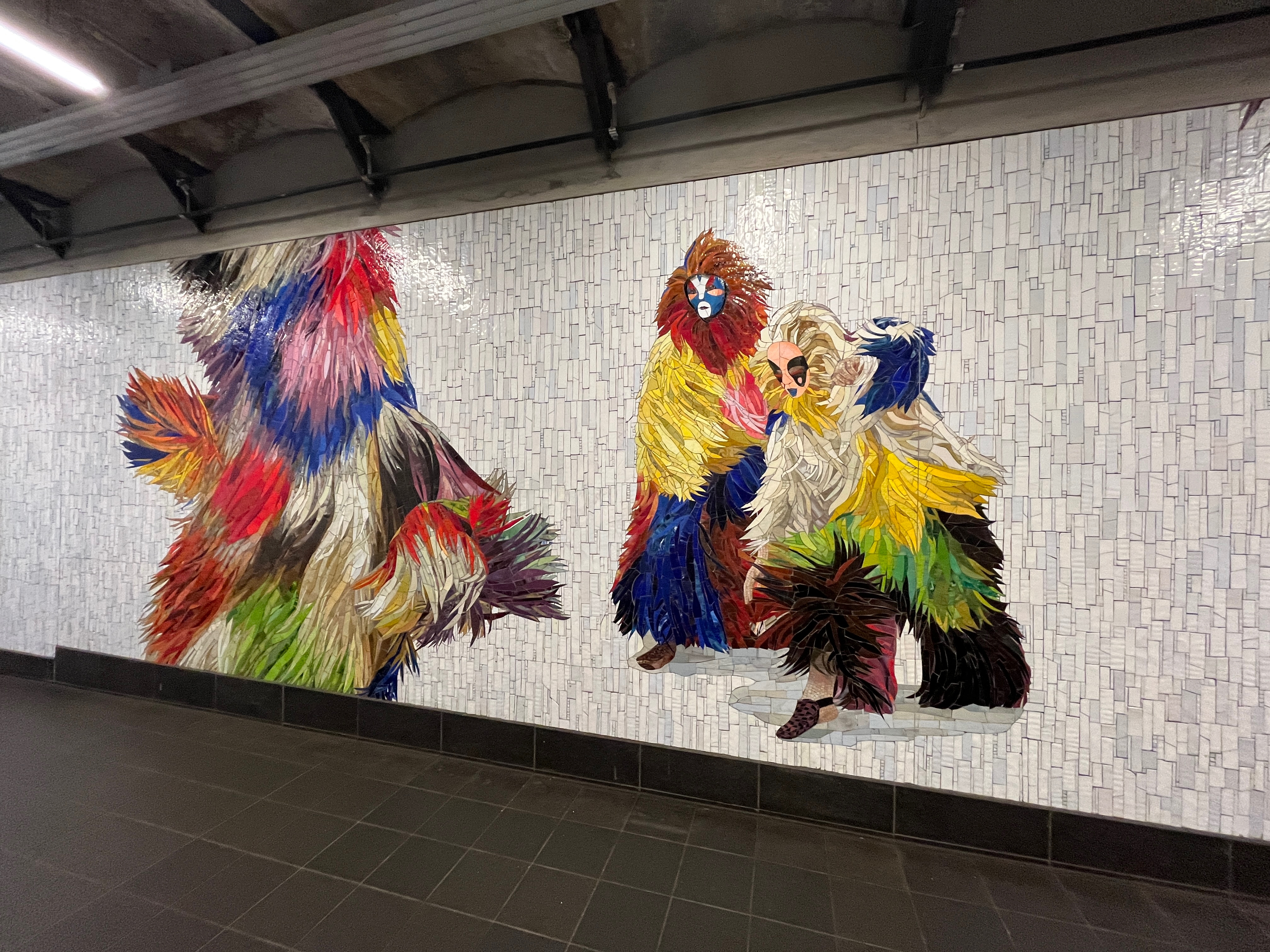
Every One
