= West Side Yard =

Rail yard in Manhattan, New York

Coordinates: 40°45′16″N 74°00′11″W

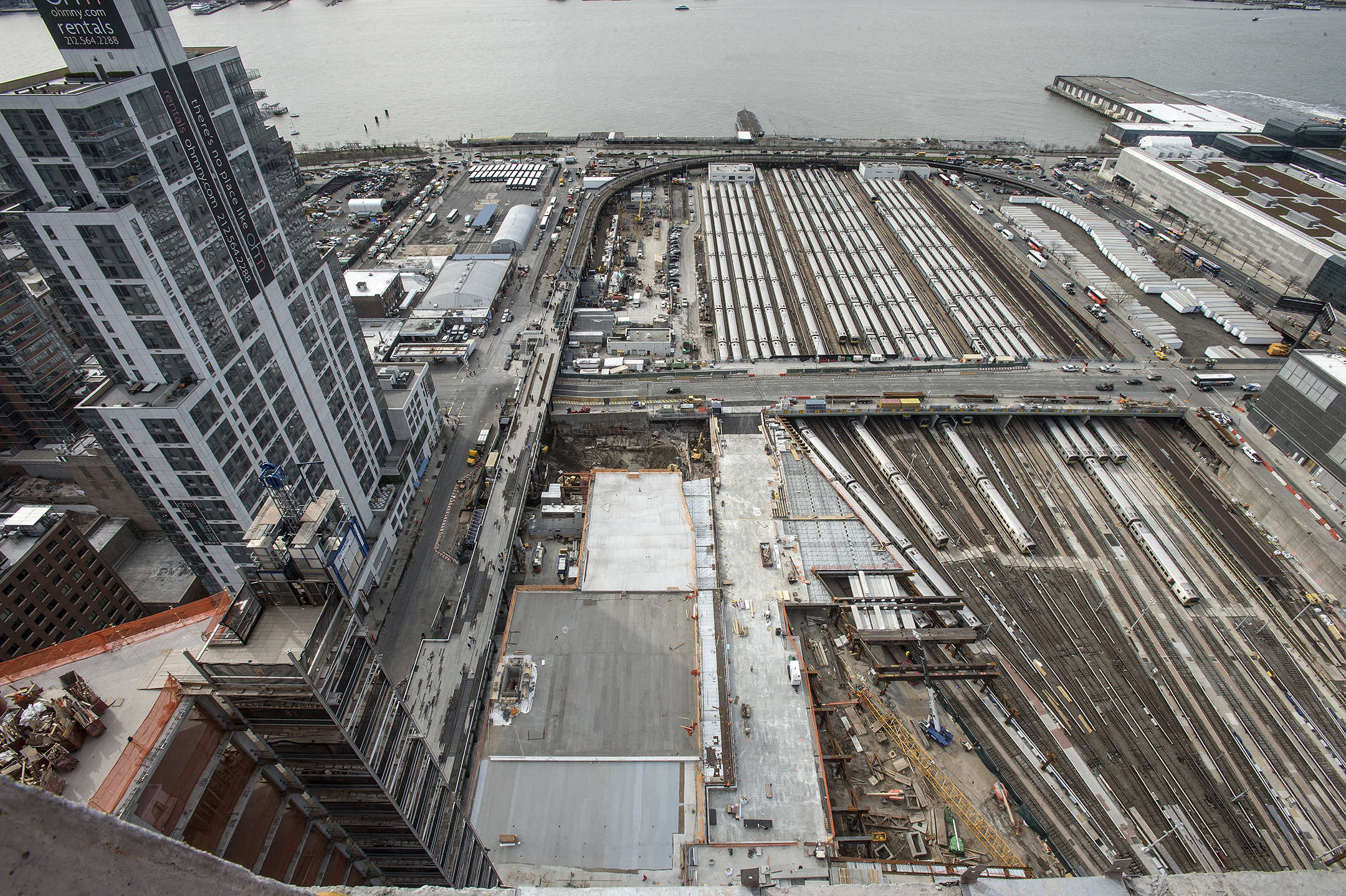
The West Side Yard, located between Penn Station and the Hudson River

The West Side Yard (officially the John D. Caemmerer West Side Yard) is a rail yard of 30 tracks owned by the Metropolitan Transportation Authority on the west side of Manhattan in New York City. Used to store commuter rail trains operated by the subsidiary Long Island Rail Road, the 26.17-acre (10.59 ha) yard sits between West 30th Street, West 33rd Street, 10th Avenue and 12th Avenue. Since the early 2010s, the eastern part of the yard has been covered by the Hudson Yards complex of skyscrapers and other buildings.

The yard includes storage tracks, a six-track indoor shop for light maintenance, a 12-car long platform for car cleaning, and lockers and a break room for employees. The yard sits at the north end of the High Line, a former elevated freight railroad converted into a park, and south of the truck marshalling yard used by the Jacob K. Javits Convention Center. It also sits just south of the 34th Street–Hudson Yards subway station, which opened in 2015.

Before the yard opened in 1987, rush-hour trains to or from Penn Station had to run without passengers to storage yards on Long Island, where the trains were stored during middays. The West Side Yard increased the LIRR's rush hour capacity at Penn Station.

== History ==
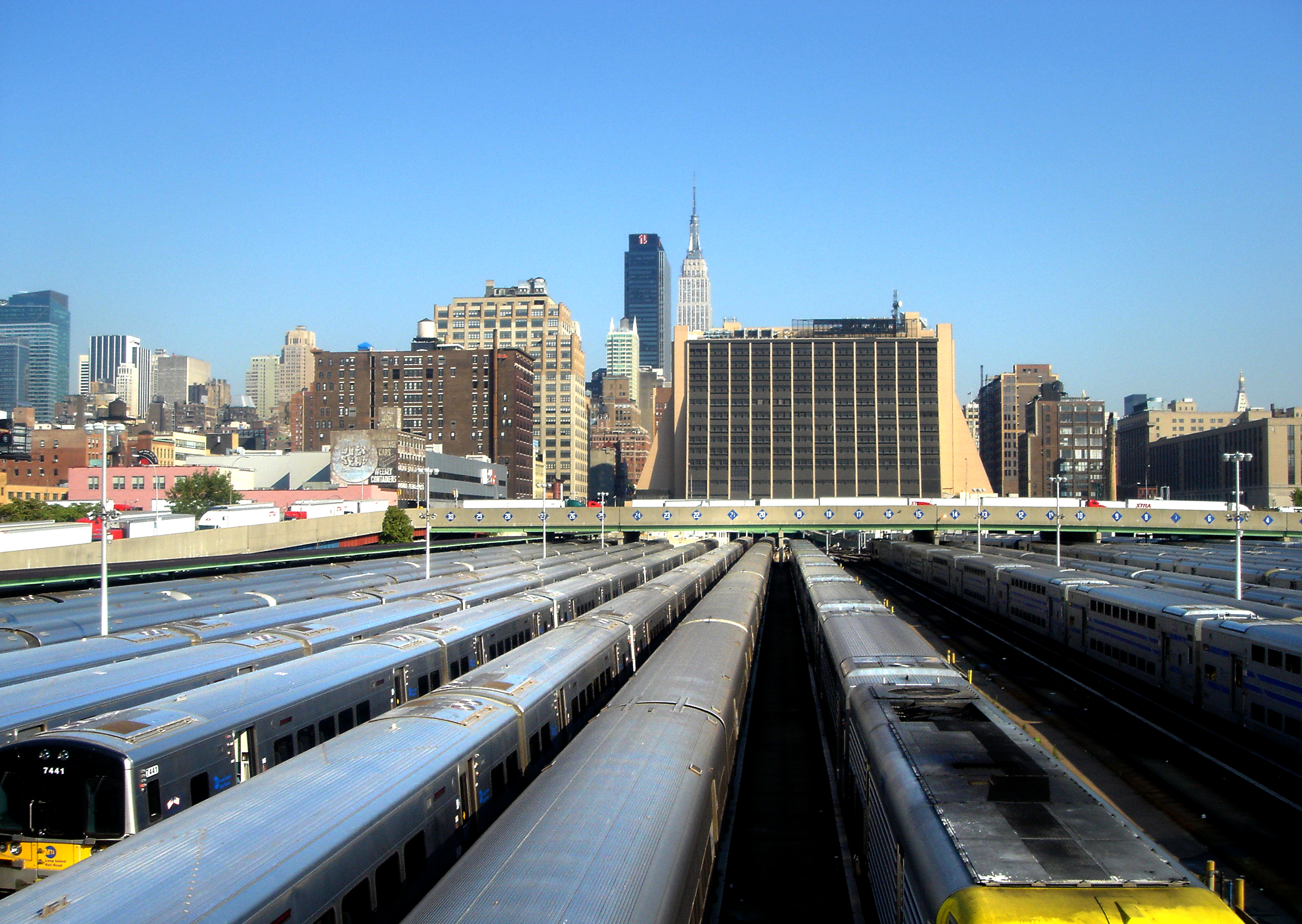
Looking east across the West Side Yard toward Penn Station in 2005

The 26.17-acre (10.59 ha) site is bounded by between West 30th Street, West 33rd Street, 10th Avenue, and 12th Avenue. Around 1851, the Hudson River Railroad built the 30th Street Yard as a depot for a line running down Eleventh Avenue, as trains were not permitted to operate south of West 32nd Street. New York Central and later Penn Central expanded the rail yards and used them as a freight terminal up until the 1970s when Penn Central declared bankruptcy and its Manhattan properties were put up for sale. The rail yard was acquired by the State of New York. The northern portion was used for construction of the Jacob K. Javits Convention Center and the southern portion became a train-storage yard used by the Long Island Rail Road.

The yard was built because limited storage capacity at Penn Station forced LIRR trains to make non-passenger trips, or "deadheads", to storage yards on Long Island. These deadheads took up track space, thus limiting capacity on lines heading toward Penn Station. The yard opened in 1987, immediately increasing train capacity through Penn Station. The West Side Yard is named after John D. Caemmerer, a New York State Senator from East Williston who helped obtain $195.7 million for its construction.

During construction, a tunnel was built under some of the east-west tracks, allowing Amtrak trains from Penn Station to turn north and travel to Upstate New York via the West Side Line. Amtrak trains began using this tunnel on April 7, 1991; before this, Empire Service trains originated from Grand Central Terminal.

=== Air rights ===
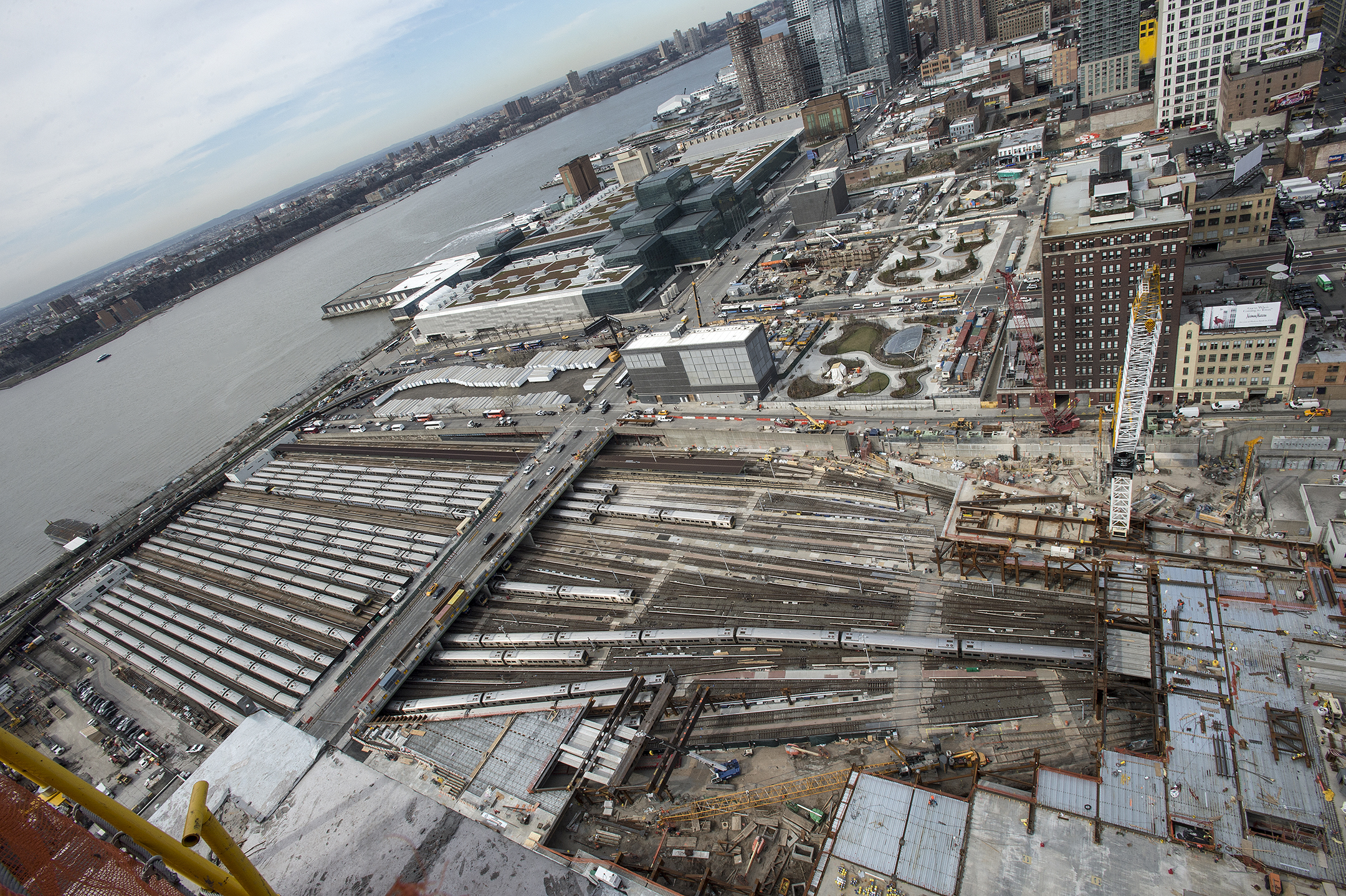
Platforms (lower right) being constructed over the eastern portion of the rail yard in 2015.

There has been a long series of proposals to develop the rail yard air rights, including for a major expansion of Midtown Manhattan by William Zeckendorf in the 1950s and for a housing development considered by U.S. Steel in the 1960s. The West Side Yard was designed with space left between the tracks for columns to support development in air rights above the tracks. Madison Square Garden considered a possible move to the site in the mid-1980s. In the 1990s the air rights were considered as a possible location for a New York Yankees stadium. The rail yard air rights were proposed by the New York City bid for the 2012 Summer Olympics as the location for the media center, Olympic plaza, and Olympic Stadium, to be occupied afterward by the New York Jets.

The eastern portion of the West Side Yard (east of 11th Avenue) was rezoned for residential and commercial use in January 2005 as part of the Hudson Yards Redevelopment Project. Following the defeat of the proposal to construct the West Side Stadium, the western portion of the rail yard was rezoned to accommodate residential and commercial development in December 2009. Construction of the first tower on the eastern portion of the rail yard, the 52-story 10 Hudson Yards, started in December 2012. To support massive towers and other elements, a platform was built above the rail yard.

== Tunnel box ==
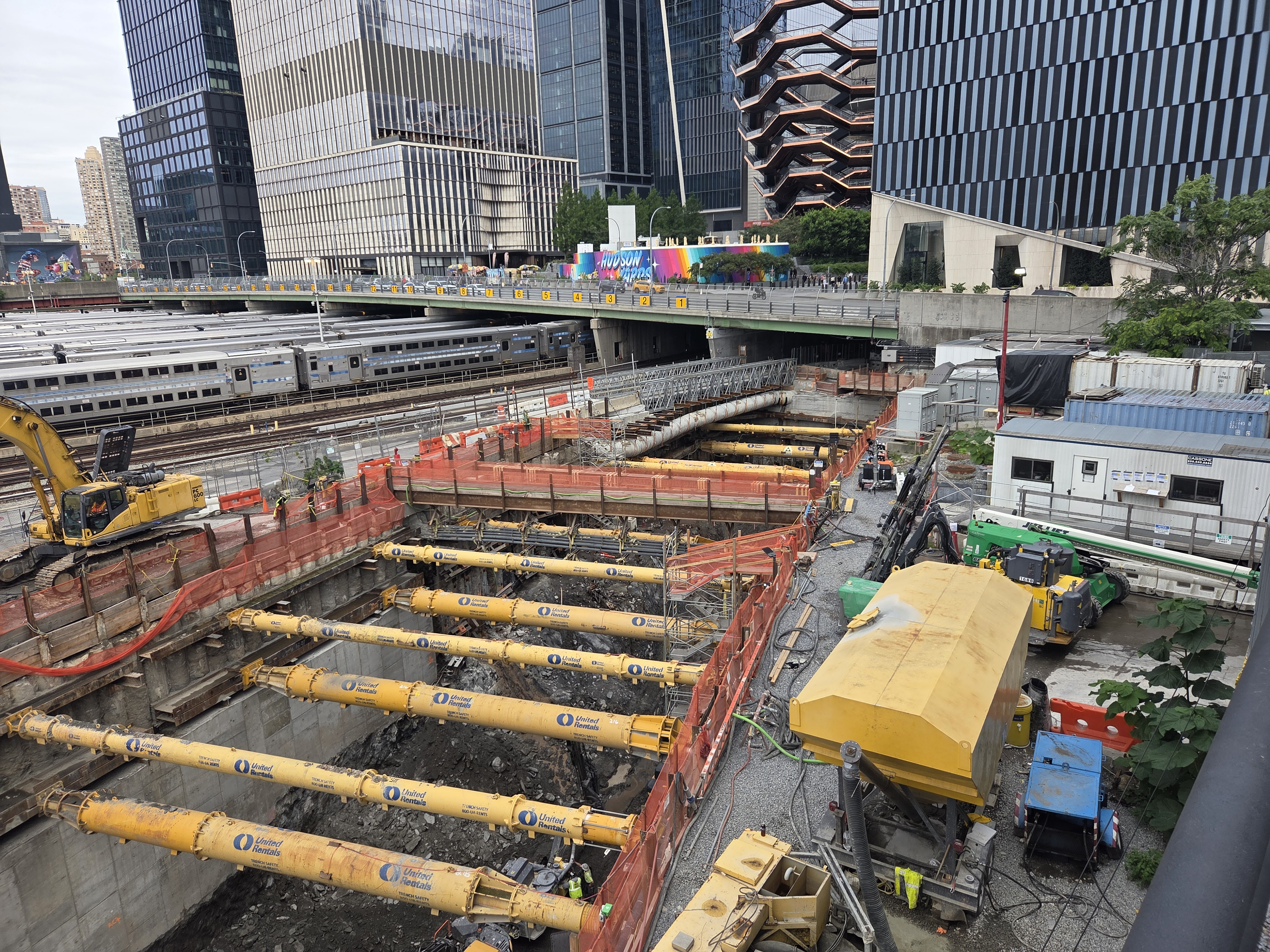
Tunnel box construction in September 2025

The Gateway Project is a proposal to build a high-speed rail corridor to alleviate the bottleneck along the Northeast Corridor between Newark, New Jersey, and New York City. To avoid a potential conflict between the Gateway Project and the Hudson Yards project, which broke ground in late 2012, Amtrak officials said in February 2013 that a right-of-way would be preserved through the Hudson Yards project by construction of a tunnel underneath, to be financed by $120 million to $150 million in federal funds. In June 2013, the US Department of Transportation announced that $183 million had been dedicated to the "tunnel box" as part of Hurricane Sandy recovery funding.

The underground concrete casing is 800 ft (240 m) long, 50 ft (15 m) wide, and approximately 35 ft (11 m) tall. Amtrak awarded Tutor Perini a $133 million contract to build a section of box tunnel. Construction started in December 2014 and was nearing completion as of July 2017, though funding disputes stalled the tunnel box's completion. The tunnel box was substantially complete by November 2017. The following phase would extend the casing between 11th and 12th Avenue as the development of Hudson Yards continues westward.

Amtrak, NJ Transit, and the MTA have applied to the Federal Transit Administration for a $65 million matching grant for another 105 ft (32 m) long structure to preserve the right-of-way at 11th Avenue in Manhattan under a viaduct that was rehabilitated in 2009–2011.

== See also ==
- List of rail yards
- List of railroad yards in New York City
- Manhattan West
- Riverside South, a real estate development on the site of a former Manhattan rail yard that was also called the "West Side Yard"
