= Jay Kriegel =

American political advisor

Jay Kriegel (1940 – 2019) was an American political advisor. He was the chief of staff to New York City mayor John Lindsay from 1966 to 1973. He was the executive director of NYC2012, the campaign organized by then mayor Michael Bloomberg to bring the 2012 Summer Olympics to New York.
