= SuperPogChamps 2025 =

Chess tournament

SuperPogChamps 2025 is a chess tournament from December 2 to December 5 hosted by Chess.com. It is the first SuperPogChamps and, as per chess.com, includes the strongest PogChamps players. It is a 12 player rapid chess tournament which includes round robins (all play all) and knockouts (one wins and eliminates others).

== Players ==
In the first stage of SuperPogChamps 2025, players are divided into two groups. Below is the list of players in their respective groups.

=== Group A ===
- (Canada) Andrea Botez
- (United States) Linda Diaz
- (Japan) Masi Oka
- (United States) SonicFox
- (United States) VoyBoy
- (Mexico) Sparg0

=== Group B ===
- (India) Samay Raina
- (United States) Daryl Morey
- (United States) Will Benson
- (United States) Tyler1
- (Norway) Wirtual
- (France) Sardoche

== Format ==
The game is played in two stages, group stage and knockout stage.

=== Group stage ===
Group stage will be played as double round robin (all play all twice). A player of each group will play two games against all other players of his/her group twice (once with white pieces, once with black) in rapid format. Each player will get 10 minutes + 5 seconds of increment each move. A person will score 3 points for a winning a match, 2 points for winning a tie-breaker, 1 point for losing a tie-breaker and no points for a loss (here, both the games played by one player against the other are considered a single match). If a player scores 1-1 with any other player (i.e. both win one and lose one game or both draw both games) then tiebreakers in blitz format will be played until a person wins a gme and breaks the tie. In such a tie-breaker, each person will get 5 minutes + 3 seconds of increment each move.

Top 3 players of group stage of each group will go into the Championship Bracket of Knockout Stage and other 3 will go into the COnsolation bracket of it.

=== Knockout Stage ===
The most scoring player of each group or each bracket will receive a bye to the semifinals (i.e. he won't play the quarter finals and directly advance into the semifinals). Each player will have to eliminate his/her opponent in each bracket and advance to the semifinals, and in the same way, advance to the finals and win.in his/her bracket. Winner of the Championship bracket will be declared the winner.

== Prize fund ==
Prize fund is awarded for scoring rank in Knockout Stage. The performance in Group stage or being in a group won't directly affect your rank in knockout stage

Rank	Prize money in respective brackets (in USD)	
Rank	Championship	Consolation
1	10,000	5,000
2	7,000	3,500
3 & 4 (tied)	4,000	3,000
5 & 6 (tied)	3,000	2,250

== Results ==
=== Group Stage ===
==== Group A ====
Players	Masi Oka	Andrea Botez	Linda Diaz	VoyBoy	SonicFox	Sparg0	Final Points (after Match Counts)
Masi Oka		1.5-0.5	1.5-0.5	2-0	2-0	2-0	15
Andrea Botez	0.5-1.5		2-1	2-0	2-1	2-0	10
Linda Diaz	0.5-1.5	1-2		1.5-0.5	2-0	2-0	10
VoyBoy	0-2	0-2	0.5-1.5		2-0	1-2	4
SonicFox	0-2	1-2	0-2	0-2		2-0	4
Sparg0	0-2	0-2	0-2	2-1	0-2		2

==== Group B ====
Players	Samay Raina	Sardoche	Wirtual	Will Benson	Tyler1	Daryl Morey	Final Points (after Match Counts)
Samay Raina		2-0	2-0	2-0	2-0	2-0	15
Sardoche	0-2		2-1	2-0	2-0	2-0	11
Wirtual	0-2	1-2		1-2	2-0	2-0	8
Will Benson	0-2	0-2	2-1		1-2	2-0	6
Tyler1	0-2	0-2	0-2	2-1		1-2	3
Daryl Morey	0-2	0-2	0-2	0-2	2-1		2

=== Knockout Stage ===
==== Championship Bracket ====
Quarterfinals
1	Masi Oka	W
8	Bye
4	Sardoche	1.5
5	Linda Diaz	0.5
2	Samay Raina	W
7	Bye
3	Andrea Botez	2
6	Wirtual	0

Semifinals
Masi Oka	0.5
Sardoche	1.5
Samay Raina	2
Andrea Botez	1

Finals
Sardoche	0
Samay Raina	2

==== Consolation Bracket ====
Quarterfinals
1	VoyBoy	W
8	Bye
4	Tyler1	0
5	Sparg0	2
2	Will Benson	W
7	Bye
3	SonicFox	2
6	Daryl Morey	1

Semifinals
VoyBoy	2
Sparg0	0
Will Benson	1
SonicFox	2

Finals
VoyBoy	2
SonicFox	0

== Final Rankings ==
Championship Bracket
Rank	Country	Player	Prize Money Won (USD)
1	India	Samay Raina	10,000
2	France	Sardoche	7,000
3 & 4 (tied)	Canada	Andrea Botez	4,000
3 & 4 (tied)	Japan	Masi Oka	4,000
5 & 6 (tied)	United States	Linda Diaz	3,000
5 & 6 (tied)	Norway	Wirtual	3,000

Consolation Bracket
Rank	Country	Player	Prize Money Won (USD)
1	United States	VoyBoy	5,000
2	United States	SonicFox	3,500
3 & 4 (tied)	United States	Will Benson	3,000
3 & 4 (tied)	Mexico	Sparg0	3,000
5 & 6 (tied)	United States	Tyler1	2,250
5 & 6 (tied)	United States	Daryl Morey	2,250
