= West Side Stadium =

Proposed stadium in New York City

- Interactive map of West Side Stadium
- Former names: New York Sports and Convention Center
- Location: West Side, Manhattan, New York City
- Coordinates: 40.754749°N 74.004082°W
- Owner: New York State
- Capacity: 75,000 (85,000 for Olympics)

Construction
- Built: Never Broke Ground
- Opened: Planned for 2008
- Cost: Over $1 billion
- Architect: Kohn Pedersen Fox

Tenant
- New York Jets

West Side Stadium (also known as the New York Sports and Convention Center) is a rejected football and Olympic stadium on a platform over the rail yards on the West Side of Manhattan in New York City.

The stadium would have been an all-weather facility with a retractable roof, allowing it to be used as either a 200,000-square-foot (18,600 m^{2}) indoor convention hall, or an 85,000-seat (75,000 post-Olympics) indoor-outdoor sporting event stadium. It was to be the new home for the New York Jets of the National Football League (NFL), who at the time of the proposal played at Giants Stadium in East Rutherford, New Jersey, and were junior tenants to the New York Giants. The stadium was to have served as the centerpiece of New York City's bid for the 2012 Summer Olympics, but, after heated debate, the proposal was defeated a month before the International Olympic Committee was to make its decision.

In the football off-season the building would have been used as an adjunct to the Jacob K. Javits Convention Center for conventions and as a replacement for Madison Square Garden. It was promoted by then New York Governor George Pataki, New York City Mayor Michael Bloomberg, and Congressman Charles Rangel, but opposed by most of the local elected officials representing the area. The centerpiece of the city's bid for the 2012 Summer Olympics, the stadium would have been part of a larger project to revitalize a long-underdeveloped area, including expansions of the Javits Center and the New York City Subway's 7 service. It was going to host Super Bowl XLIV in 2010 along with a college bowl game with a Big East team to be known as the Big Apple Bowl. It is now part of the site of the Hudson Yards development.

== Background ==
Before there were plans to construct the football stadium on the site, there had been long series of proposals to develop the air rights above the rail yards on the West Side of Manhattan. These included a major expansion of Midtown Manhattan by William Zeckendorf in the 1950s, a housing development considered by U.S. Steel in the 1960s, a possible relocation of Madison Square Garden in the mid-1980s, and a possible location for a New York Yankees stadium in the 1990s. Plans for a football stadium on the site first surfaced in 1999. When the rail yards were reconstructed as the West Side Yard in the 1980s, the facility was designed with space left between the tracks for columns to support development in the air rights above the tracks and allow for construction without interrupting use of the rail yard.

== Funding ==
=== Public funds ===
The stadium proved highly controversial because it would have been a major construction project requiring public financing. Though many of its opponents supported the larger West Side development program, they questioned the economic benefit of a stadium that would have spent much of its time unused, as well as the general premise of subsidizing a football team that generates hundreds of millions of dollars in revenue for a private owner. Opponents felt that the budget could be better spent on mixed-use facilities. Supporters of the stadium said the cost to the city (over $1 billion) was an investment and would create thousands of jobs and billions in commercial revenue for the area, perhaps leading to increased tax revenue that could be used for vital infrastructure.

=== Bidding ===
The rail yards were owned by the Metropolitan Transportation Authority (MTA), which originally negotiated privately with the Jets without seeking other possible buyers. After Cablevision presented a rival proposal for West Side development without a stadium, public sentiment against an apparent no-bid contract for the Jets prompted the MTA to establish an open bidding process for the site. There were three bids, from the Jets, from Cablevision and from Transgas, a power company. On March 31, 2005, the MTA board voted to accept the bid from the Jets, even though the Cablevision offer included more cash up front. Attorneys for Cablevision announced that they would file suit to challenge the decision, and many other media outlets lambasted the MTA's decision as simply doing Governor Pataki's bidding rather than accepting a plan that would best serve the public.

== Mixed opinion ==
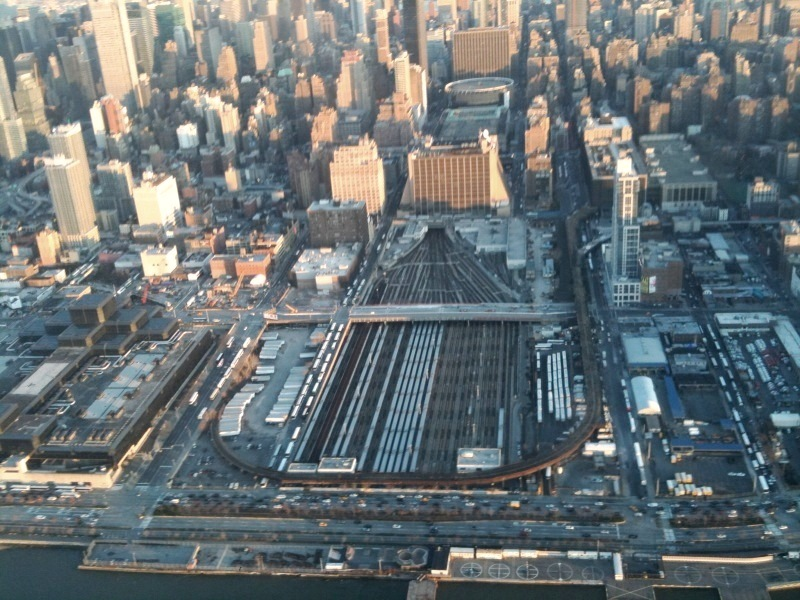
The West Side Stadium would have been built between Eleventh Avenue and Twelfth Avenue, above the LIRR's West Side Yard.

Public opinion was mixed. Some citizens of New York and New Jersey were in favor of the stadium because they wanted the 2012 Summer Olympics to be held in New York City. In order to host the Olympics, cities typically must build modern stadiums and prove to the International Olympic Committee that they have the resources to support the event.

Many Manhattan and West Side residents did not want the inconvenience, traffic congestion and resource drain that they believed the Olympics would bring to the already overcrowded city. The New York Daily News reported that 59% of New Yorkers were not in favor of holding the Olympics in New York at all. In December 2004, the commuter advocacy groups Straphangers Campaign and Tri-State Transportation Campaign filed a lawsuit that challenged the city's estimate that 70% of stadium patrons would use mass transit or arrive on foot instead of driving. Many Jets fans wanted the stadium built, no matter what the cost.

The stadium was also notably opposed by Cablevision, at the time the sixth-largest cable television company in the United States and the then-owner of Madison Square Garden (MSG)—home to the New York Knicks and New York Rangers—and the MSG Network, which broadcasts most of those teams' games. Although MSG was initially a prospective partner in the project, it eventually concluded that the design was unworkable for their needs. After MSG dropped out, the city and state decided to proceed anyway. The decision to place a new sports and concert venue in such close proximity to MSG, where it would hamper the older venue's ability to secure concerts and other events, made Cablevision oppose the plan. Cablevision responded with an expensive advertising campaign and large lobbying budget and made a $600 million offer to redevelop the stadium site for housing and office space instead of a stadium, and they initiated another lawsuit alleging that the city's environmental study was inaccurate.

Cablevision's stance against the stadium proposal was cited as "a factor" in the NFL moving its 2005 draft away from Cablevision-owned Theater at Madison Square Garden to the Jacob K. Javits Convention Center, ending a 10-year run of the event at MSG. (The NFL moved the Draft to another Cablevision-controlled property, Radio City Music Hall, in 2006, but the league eventually began to award the event to other cities as a three-day spring event, due to growing popularity that New York's venues could not easily accommodate.)

=== Television ads ===
The controversy spawned a political ad war on local television, with rival campaigns financed by the owners of the Jets and Cablevision. Proponents of the stadium said that the opposition ran deceptive television and radio ads claiming that a large multi-organizational coalition opposes the stadium, while many of these ads were funded by Cablevision. Cablevision said that it was presenting arguments other groups had actually made and that it was within its legal rights in refusing to run advertisements supportive of the stadium on its local cable systems, while running many ads critical of it.

== Politics ==
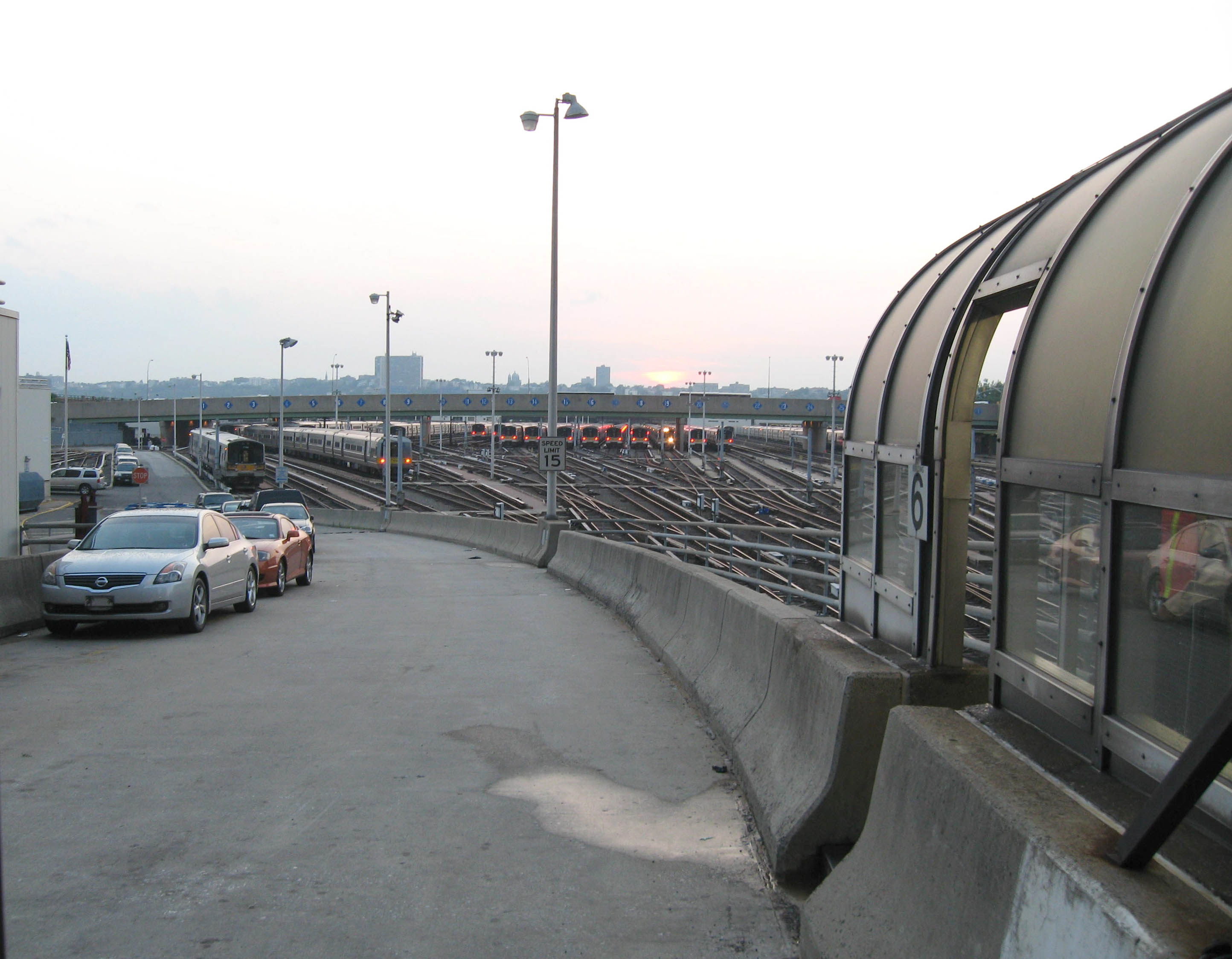
When the West Side Yard was built in the mid-1980s, space was left between the tracks to allow for columns supporting an overbuild. The space is now in use for the Hudson Yards development.

The stadium issue was also a political issue, as 2005 was an election year. Some individuals, most notably mayoral candidate Anthony Weiner, suggested another location in Queens, which has large open spaces and was home to other sports facilities such as Shea Stadium (former home of the New York Mets and Jets), as a possible alternative site for a stadium. The Jets ownership, however, said that any site other than the West Side would be no better than remaining in New Jersey.

Two components of the stadium plan ($300 million in state funding and the MTA's transfer of the land) were subject to the approval of the state's Public Authorities Control Board. The Board's approval could be given only on a unanimous vote of its three members, who were representatives of New York State Assembly Speaker Sheldon Silver, New York State Senate Majority Leader Joseph Bruno, and Pataki. On June 6, 2005, although Pataki's representative voted in favor, Silver and Bruno directed their representatives to abstain on the vote, thus denying the needed approval and scuttling the proposal. Silver, in particular, had vehemently opposed the project, saying it would divert money needed to rebuild Lower Manhattan in the wake of the September 11 attacks. Asked if the stadium was dead, Silver answered, "It was never alive."

== Olympic decision ==
Also on June 6, the International Olympic Committee released an evaluation of each city's bid, in which it noted that the New York City bid could not guarantee that the stadium would be available. With the defeat of the West Side Stadium plan, Mayor Bloomberg and the New York 2012 campaign shifted their focus to the construction of a new Mets ballpark, Citi Field, as the centerpiece to the Olympic bid, but the 2012 games were eventually awarded to London.

=== Aftermath ===
In reaction to the state representatives' decision to reject the stadium's funding, the NFL decided on August 11 to reopen the bidding for the game site of Super Bowl XLIV. The eventual winner was Sun Life Stadium. The proposed college football bowl game (now called the Pinstripe Bowl) has been played annually at Yankee Stadium starting in December 2010.

After the West Side Stadium proposal was rejected, the Jets entered into a 50/50 partnership with the Giants to build a new stadium in East Rutherford to replace Giants Stadium. New Meadowlands Stadium (now MetLife Stadium) opened in 2010 and hosted Super Bowl XLVIII in 2014.

The site that the stadium would have been built on was rezoned to accommodate residential and commercial development in 2009. The site was being proposed to be a 1,750 room integrated resort and casino by Wynn Resorts. The hotel would have been 1,189 feet, and 80 floors, tall, making it one of the largest hotels in New York City if it was built. Wynn Resorts withdrew its bid in May of 2025.

== In popular culture ==
The controversy surrounding the proposed stadium was the subject of the film A Stadium Story: The Battle for New York's Last Frontier, which premiered at the 2006 Tribeca Film Festival. Directed by Benjamin Rosen and Jevon Roush, two childhood friends that grew up in Lower Manhattan, the film included footage of interviews, meetings and rallies for the campaigns being led in support of and opposed to the stadium. Rosen got the idea to create the film in 2004 during a conversation with fellow filmmaker Marc Levin, as Levin's office in the Starrett–Lehigh Building looked out onto the site of the proposed stadium.

== See also ==
- New York City mayoral election, 2005 where the proposed stadium was a crucial issue
