= West Side (Manhattan) =

Area of Manhattan in New York City

Coordinates: 40.788°N 73.978°W

The West Side of Manhattan refers to the side of Manhattan Island that abuts the Hudson River and faces the U.S. state of New Jersey. The major neighborhoods on the West Side are (from north to south) Inwood, Hudson Heights, Washington Heights, West Harlem, Morningside Heights, Manhattan Valley, the Upper West Side, Hell's Kitchen, Chelsea, the West Village, SoHo, and Tribeca. The 8th Avenue and West Side subway lines connect all parts of the West Side.

The main north–south roads servicing the West Side are the Henry Hudson Parkway in the north and the West Side Highway in the south. The Hudson River Greenway separates these highways from the island's western shore.

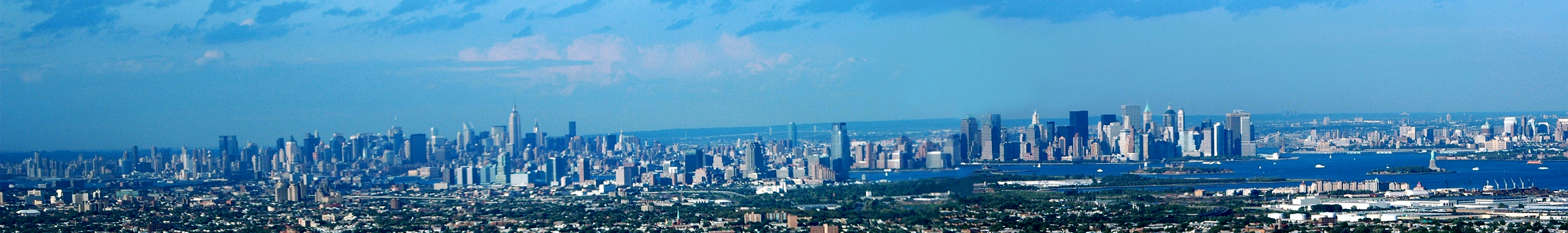
Manhattan and Downtown Brooklyn as seen from the west with New Jersey communities in the foreground

== Redevelopment ==
Hudson Yards, Manhattan, would have been the location of West Side Stadium, which was intended as the Olympic stadium for the New York City bid for the 2012 Summer Olympics. After the rejection of the $2 billion stadium plan that would also lure the New York Jets to Manhattan, developers made plans, including the Hudson Yards Redevelopment Project, to redevelop the West Side with a mix of commercial and residential buildings.

== See also ==
- East Side (Manhattan)
- West Side Story
