= New York City bid for the 2012 Summer Olympics =

Bids for the 2012 Summer Olympics and Paralympics
Overview
- Games of the XXX Olympiad; XIV Paralympic Games
- Winner: London; Runner-up: Paris; Shortlist: Madrid · Moscow · New York City

Details
- City: New York City, USA
- NOC: U.S. Olympic Committee

Evaluation
- IOC score: 7.5

Previous Games hosted
- None

Decision
- Result: Eliminated in the 2nd round of voting

The New York City 2012 Olympic bid was one of the five short-listed bids for the 2012 Summer Olympics, ultimately won by London.

New York City's Olympic bid was managed by a private non-profit organization, NYC 2012, founded by Daniel L. Doctoroff, then the managing director of Oak Hill Capital Partners, a private equity firm. Doctoroff thought of bringing the Olympic Games to New York after witnessing New York's international sports fans at a 1994 FIFA World Cup match in Giants Stadium. He then built a team to help craft a plan for staging the Games. Seven years later, Doctoroff resigned as President of NYC2012 to join the administration of Mayor Michael Bloomberg, but he continued to lead New York's Olympic Bid as Deputy Mayor for Economic Development and Rebuilding.

Two of the biggest projects proposed as part of the bid were the revival of the East River waterfront, including the construction of an Olympic Village across the river from the United Nations Headquarters and an aquatics center in Brooklyn, and the construction of West Side Stadium, which was supposed to have led to the comprehensive redevelopment of the Far West Side of Manhattan. Other projects that were part of the bid included a rowing course in Queens, a velodrome in the South Bronx, a marina along the coast of the Atlantic Ocean, an equestrian center on Staten Island, and the refurbishment of the historic 369th Regiment Armory in Harlem.

== USOC selection process ==
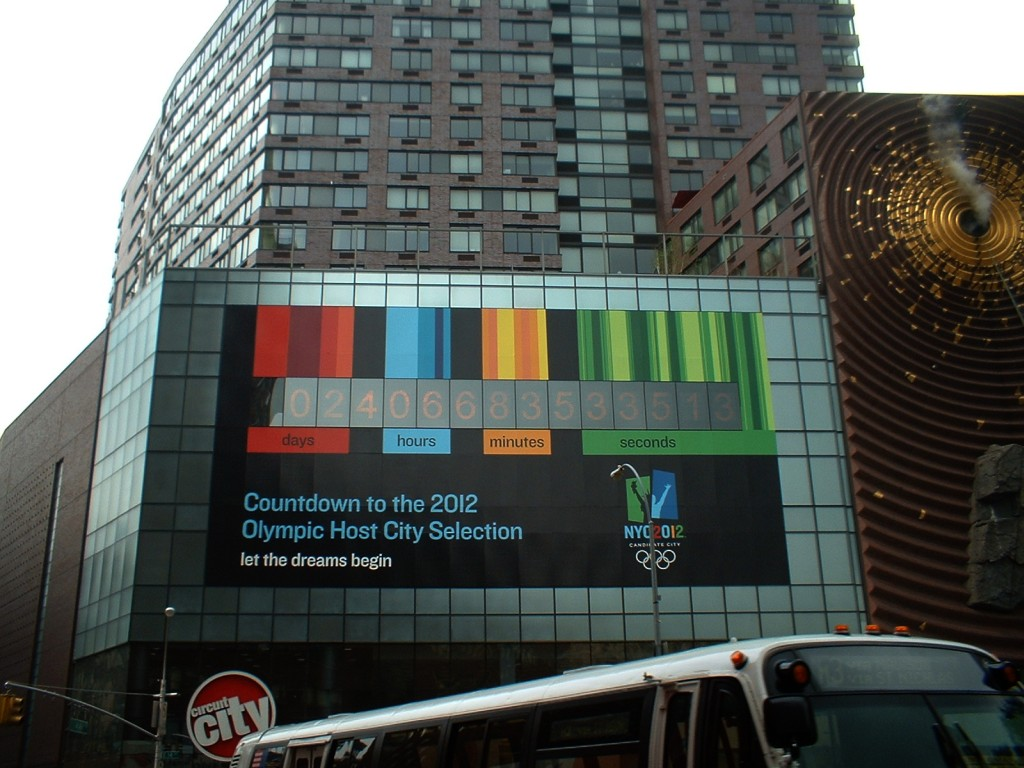
Metronome monument in Union Square in livery for serving as a countdown clock to the 2012 Olympic host city selection event.

While New York City had never hosted the Olympic Games before, the city launched a short-lived campaign in 1977 to bid for the 1984 Summer Olympics. In this plan, the main venue for the Games would have been Shea Stadium, but there were doubts as to whether the New York Mets would actually be willing to temporarily vacate their stadium during the regular season for the event. The U.S. Olympic Committee (USOC), responsible for choosing no more than one American city to bid for each edition of the Olympics, voted 55–39 to give that opportunity to Los Angeles,which was successfully awarded the Games by the International Olympic Committee (IOC) the following year.

Daniel Doctoroff, an investment banker, was inspired to start a new campaign for New York City to host the Olympic Games after attending a 1994 FIFA World Cup match at Giants Stadium. Doctoroff gained the support of Mayor Rudy Giuliani and influential business leaders. Giuliani announced plans to bid for the 2008 Summer Olympics in June 1996, days after the Olympic torch passed through the city on its way to the Atlanta Games.

On May 15, 1997, the USOC announced it would not pursue a bid for 2008, believing that more time was needed to put together a bid that could match the strong competition put up by other countries. All applicant cities were encouraged to apply for the 2012 Summer Olympics or for the 2007 Pan American Games instead. Beginning the process of choosing a candidate city in 1997 meant that the USOC would have eight years to prepare for the IOC's host city selection vote in 2005. The USOC set a deadline of October 20, 1997, for all cities interested in a 2012 bid to submit an application. New York was one of 10 cities to apply, sending a non-refundable deposit of $150,000 to the USOC.

Candidate cities were given four years to refine their proposals before the USOC began eliminating cities from contention. The NYC2012 committee prepared a 700-page formal bid, which was submitted to the USOC in May 2001. A site selection committee from the USOC visited New York from July 31 to August 2, 2001, to evaluate the city's facilities. The September 11 attacks destroyed the World Trade Center in lower Manhattan during the selection process.

New York was one of four cities shortlisted by the USOC on October 26, 2001, alongside Houston, San Francisco, and Washington, D.C. Following a second round of city visits, New York and San Francisco were chosen as finalists on August 27, 2002. The two remaining candidates were referred to the USOC board of directors, which held the final vote to choose its nominee at USOC headquarters in Colorado Springs on November 2. New York received 59 percent of the available votes over San Francisco, making it the U.S. candidate city for the 2012 Olympics.

== Venues ==
Olympic venues would have been spread around the city, had it been selected for the Olympics.

=== Olympic Village ===
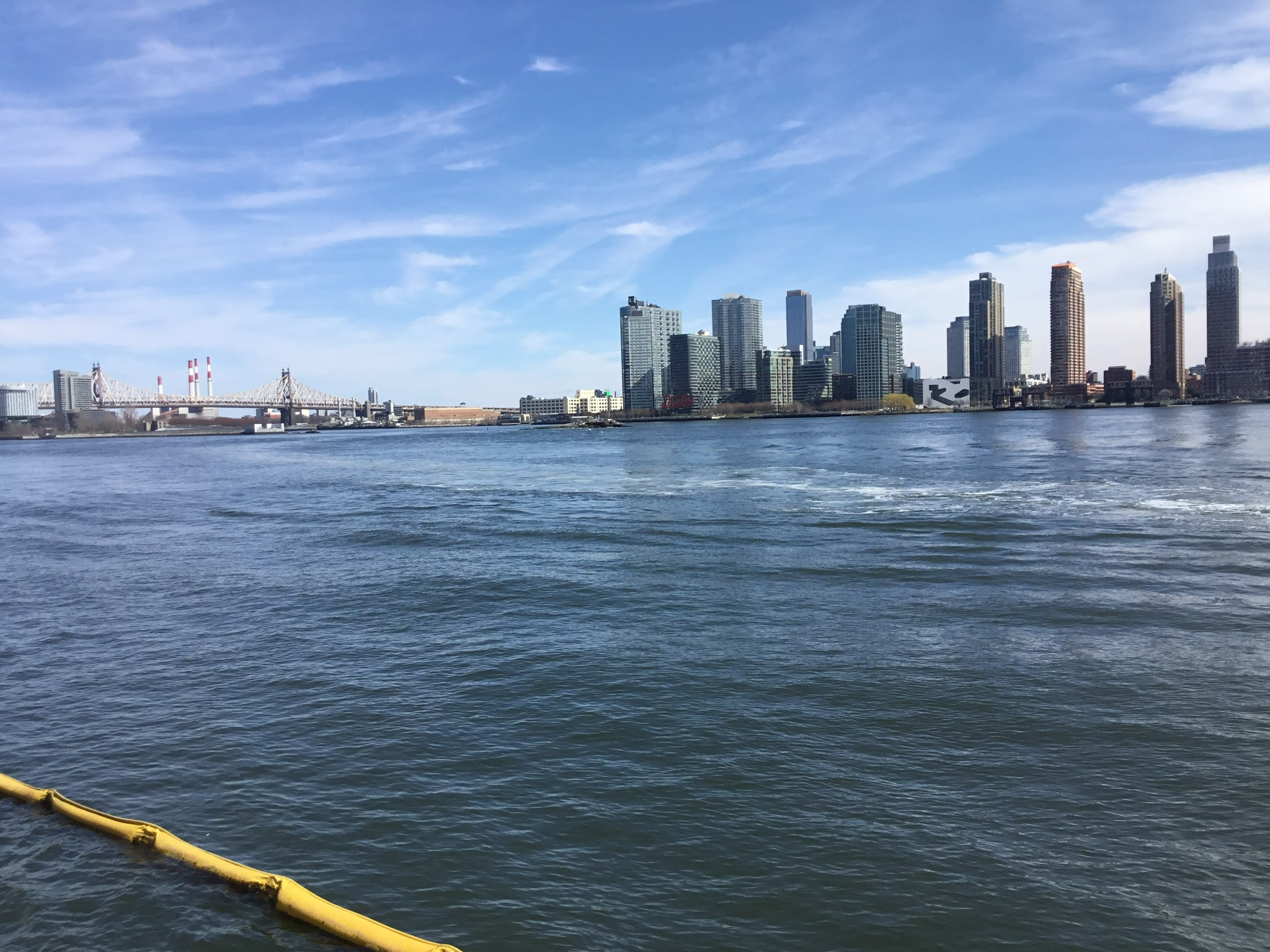
The Olympic village would have been located in Long Island City in Queens, across the East River from Manhattan.

The Village would have been located on the East River Waterfront of Queens across from the United Nations Headquarters. During the Olympics and Paralympics, it would have housed more than 16,000 athletes and coaches. Costing an estimate of $1.5 billion, the Village would include plazas and shops, restaurants, acres of green landscape, training centers and fields, a private dining hall, religious centers, and ferry and train service. Post-Olympic plans would provide world-class residential housing for up to 18,000 New York residents. The area would have been designed by Morphosis Architects as the heart and crossroad of New York's Olympic X Plan.

=== Olympic Square (Manhattan) ===
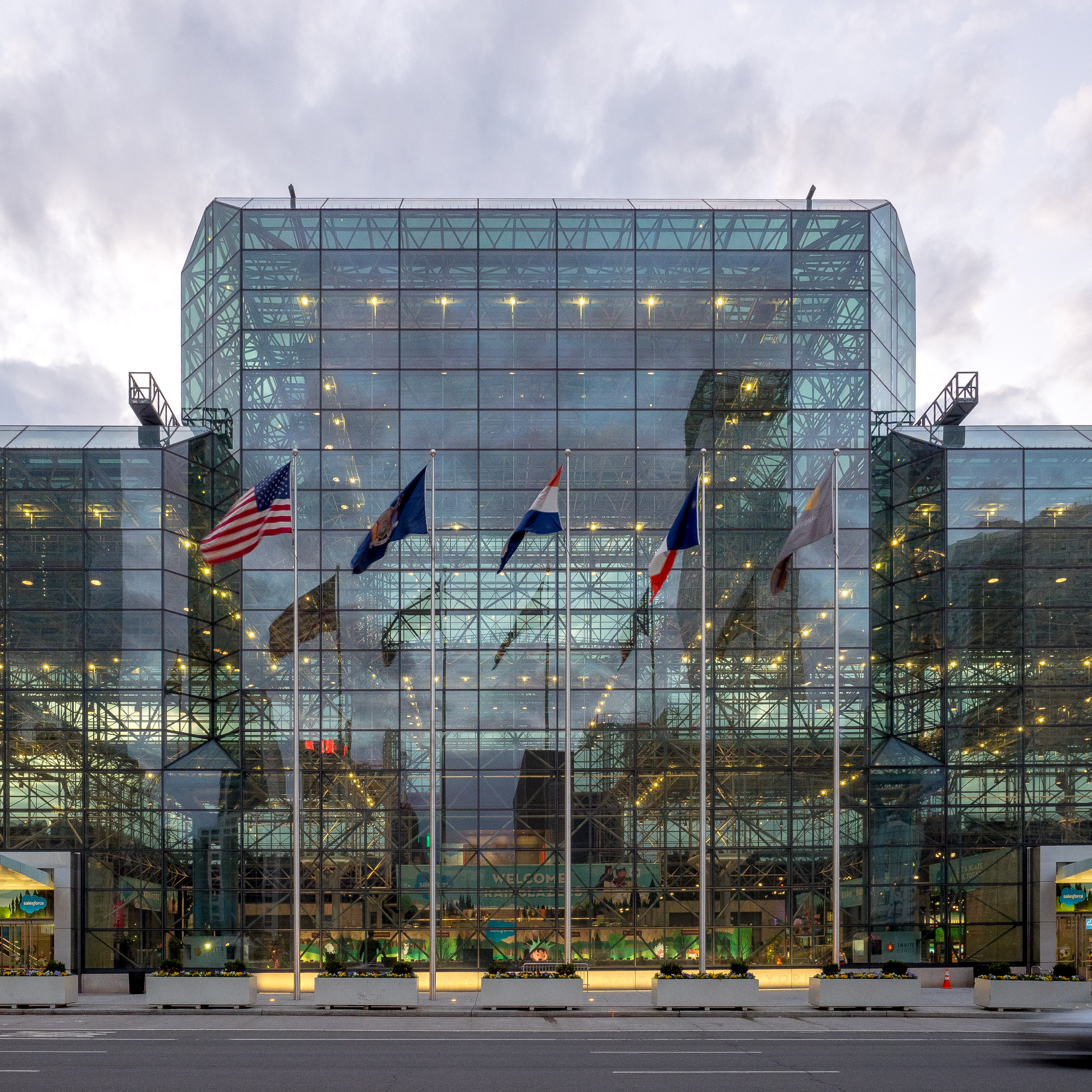
The Javits Center was proposed to host multiple events had New York hosted the 2012 Olympics.

- West Side Stadium (Opening/Closing Ceremony, Athletics, Football-Finals match)
- International Broadcasting Center/Main Press Center
- Jacob K. Javits Convention Center along with its expansion (Wrestling, Judo, Taekwondo, Fencing, Weightlifting, Table Tennis)
- Madison Square Garden (Basketball Preliminaries/Finals, Boxing Preliminaries/Finals)
- Central Park (Triathlon)
- Robert K. Kraft Field at Columbia University (Field Hockey Tournament)
- 369th Regiment Armory (Boxing Preliminaries, Rhythmic Gymnastics)

=== Olympic Park (Queens) ===
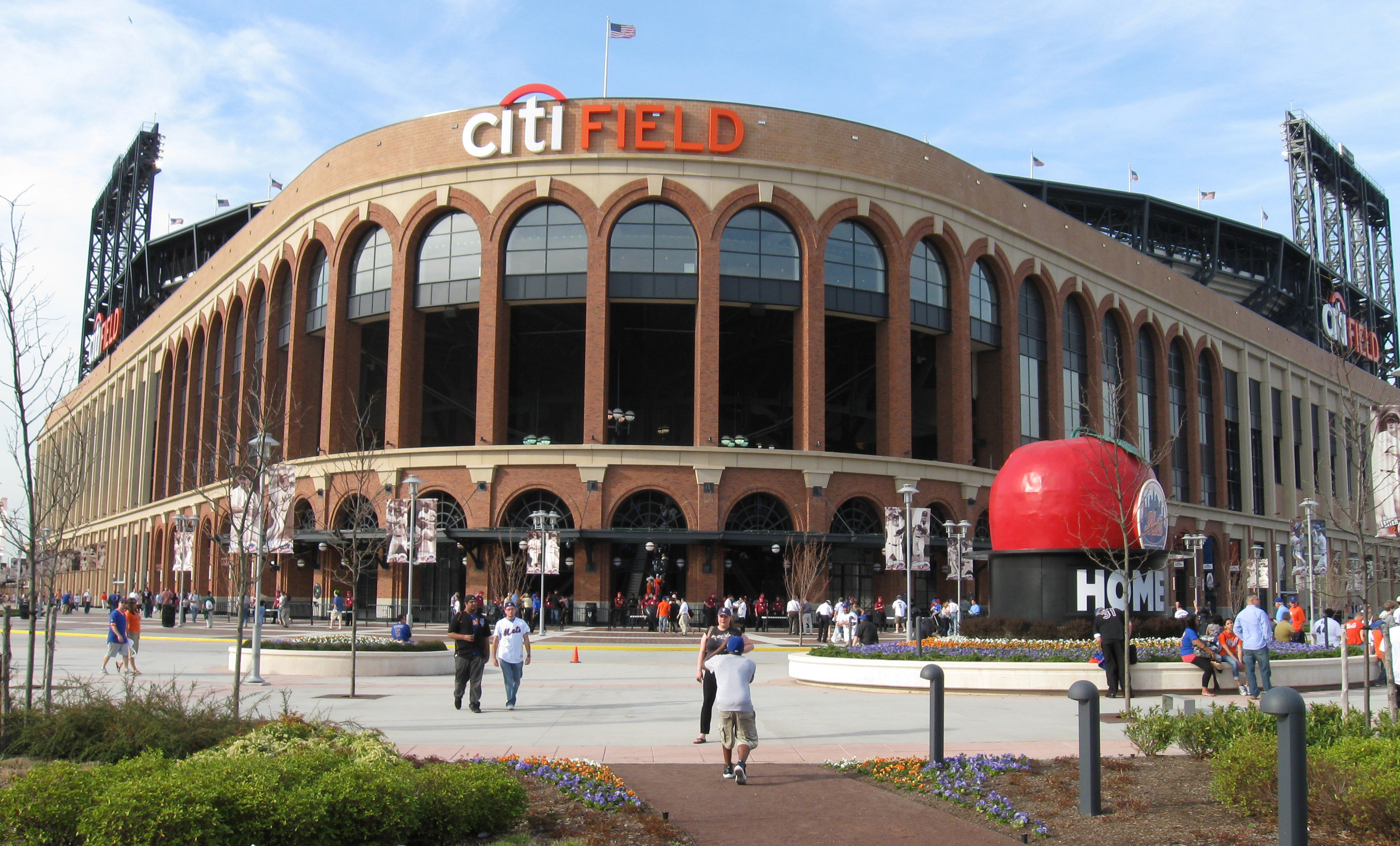
CitiField would have served as the Olympic Stadium before being converted into a baseball stadium.

- Olympic Stadium (moved due to refusal of West Side Stadium)
- Flushing-Meadows Corona Regatta Center (Canoe/Kayak and Rowing)
- USTA Billie Jean King National Tennis Center (Tennis)
- Fountain of the planets at Flushing Meadows-Corona Park (Canoe Slalom)
- Water Polo Center(Water Polo)
- Archery Stadium near the backdrop of the Unisphere
- Breezy Point Marina (Sailing, Marathon Start)

=== Olympic Riverfront (Bronx) ===
- Yankee Stadium (Baseball)
- Pelham Bay Shooting and Pentathlon Center
- Queensbridge Athletic Center (Badminton, Cycling)

=== Elsewhere in the metropolitan area ===
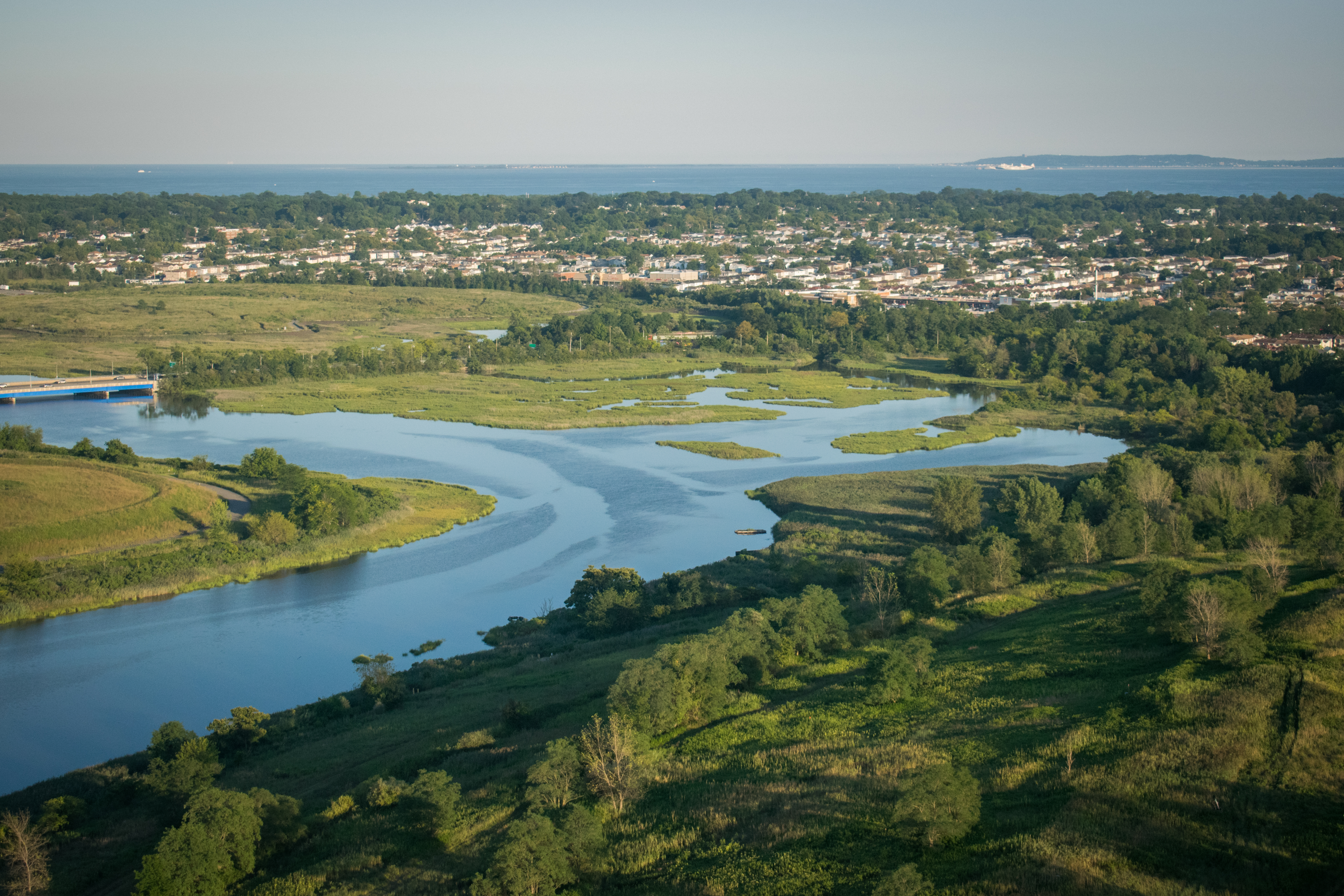
Freshkills Park in Staten Island would have hosted mountain biking.

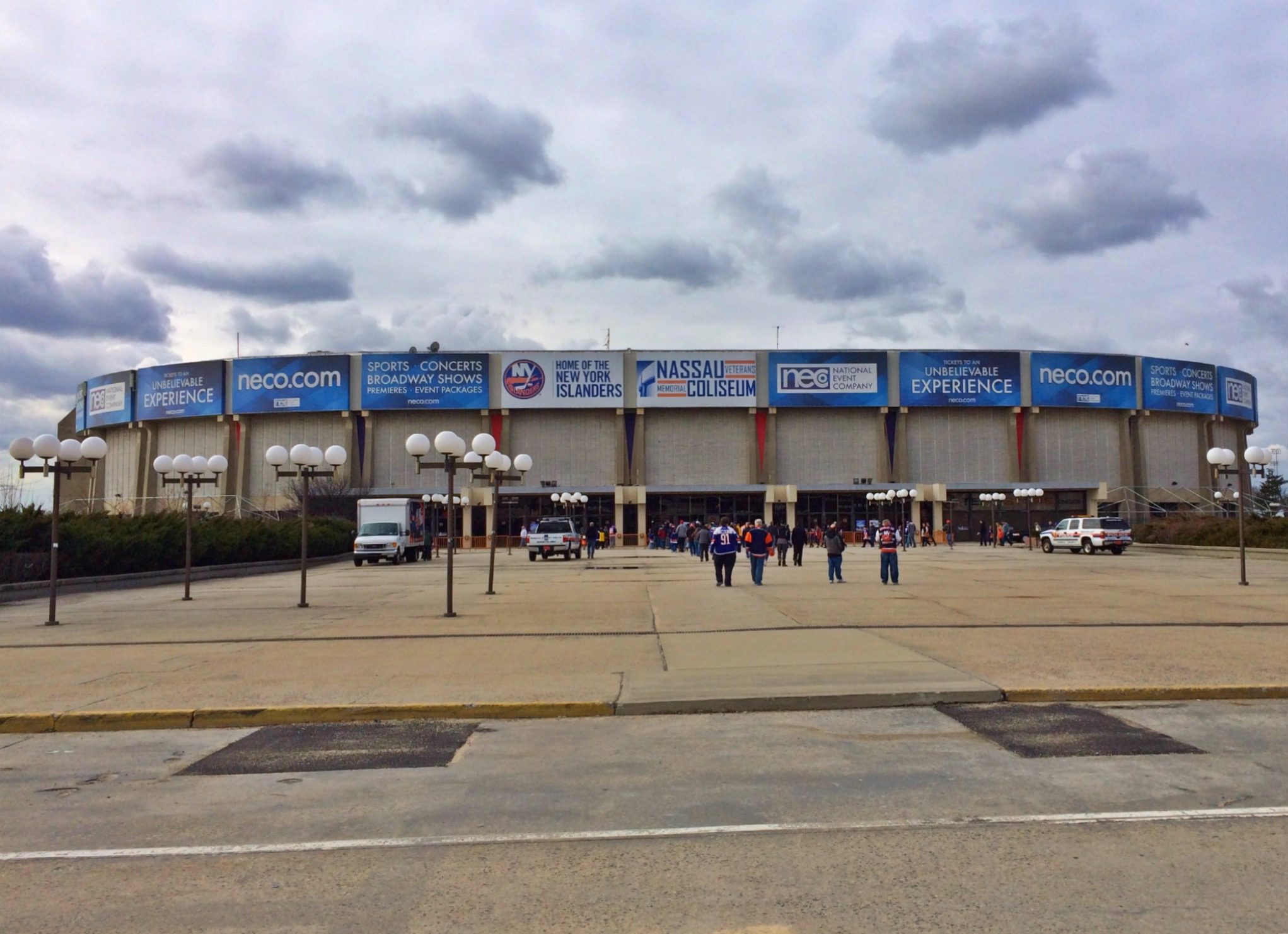
The Nassau Coliseum in Nassau County would have hosted Handball.

Brooklyn

- Barclays Center (Artistic/Trampolining Gymnastics, Basketball Preliminaries/Finals)
- Williamsburg Waterfront Center (Aquatics, Beach Volleyball)

Staten Island

- Greenbelt Equestrian Center (also the Olympic Horse Village)
- Fresh Kills Park (Mountain Biking)
- Fort Wadsworth (Road Cycling)
- Richmond County Bank Ballpark (Softball)

Long Island

- Nassau Veterans Memorial Coliseum (Handball)

New Jersey

- Meadowlands Arena (Indoor Volleyball)
- Giants Stadium (Football Preliminaries)

=== Elsewhere in the United States (football preliminaries) ===
- Gillette Stadium (Boston)
- Yale Bowl (New Haven)
- Lincoln Financial Field (Philadelphia)
- FedExField (Washington, DC)

== West Side Stadium ==
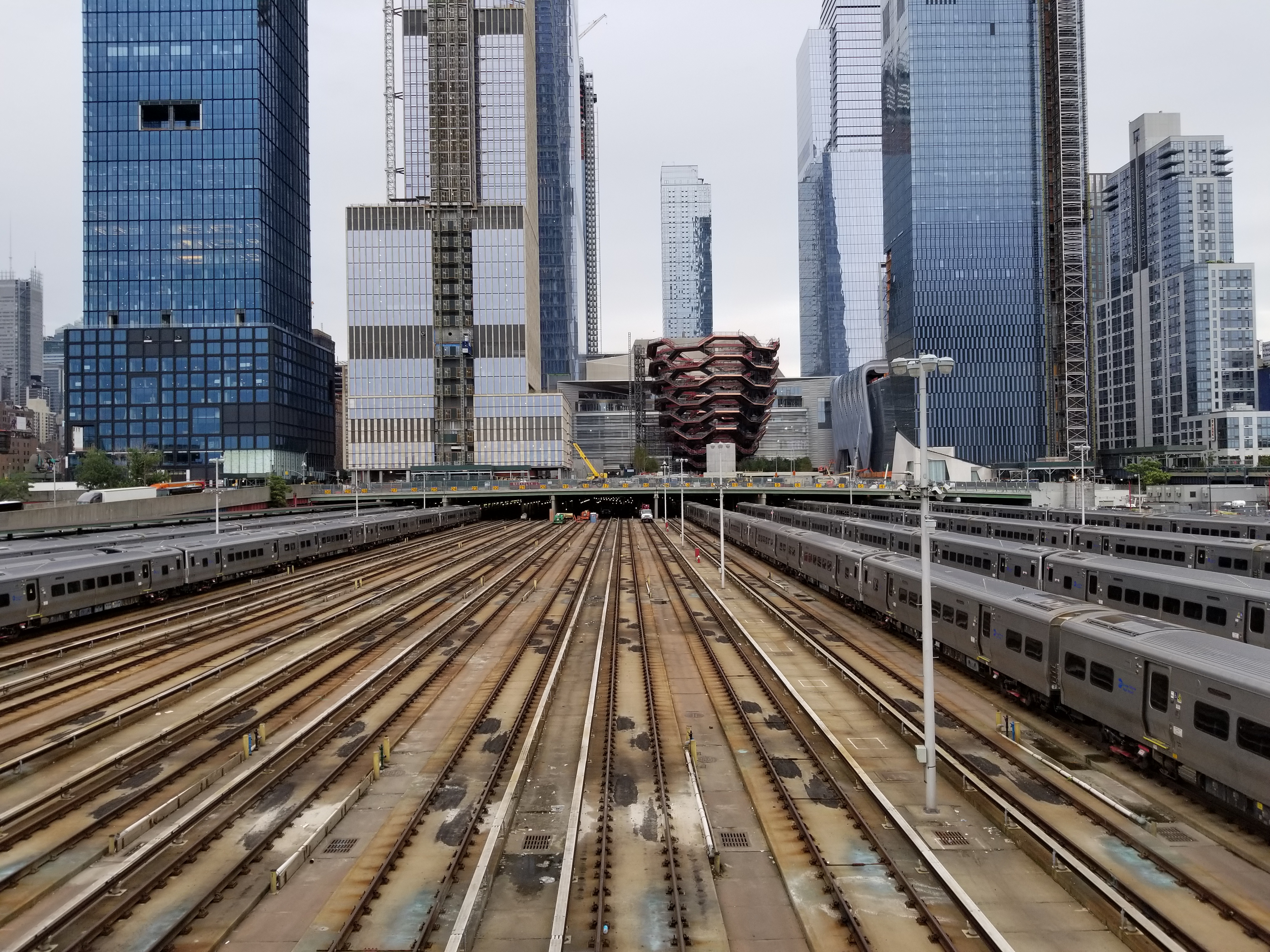
The West Side Stadium would have been built atop the West Side Yards.

An Olympic Stadium on the West Side of Manhattan had been part of NYC2012's plan since 2000, when the organization's blueprint for the Games was formally unveiled to the public. Host to opening and closing ceremonies and athletics competitions, the West Side Stadium would have sat adjacent to the Jacob Javits Convention Center, host to six Olympic sports, Olympic Square Park, and a new 40+ story office tower that would have housed Olympic broadcasters in 2012.

The Stadium's construction was scheduled to proceed regardless of whether New York was awarded the 2012 Olympic Games. The project was to be paid for by the New York Jets ($800 million), New York City ($300 million for infrastructure), and New York State ($300 million for the retractable roof). According to the project's promoters, the building's retractable roof, unnecessary for football, would make the stadium a flexible, multi-purpose facility. It would provide a long-term boost to New York's economy and would jump-start the development of Manhattan's Far West Side.

Local civic groups concerned with congestion and a changing neighborhood had long opposed its construction, and it historically had low citywide approval ratings. The project managed to stay largely out of the media and public spotlight until early 2004 when Cablevision released its first round of advertising against the Stadium. As the owner of Madison Square Garden, which is located just a few blocks from the site of the proposed Olympic Stadium, Cablevision saw the new facility as a potential threat to the Garden's share of concert, convention, and other major event business.

Political opponents of New York mayor Michael Bloomberg, notably the contenders for the Democratic mayoral nomination, used the Stadium issue as a symbol that he was a billionaire who was out of touch with the needs of average New Yorkers. Cablevision spent over $30 million on negative advertising and political lobbying and even generated a competing proposal for development of the Stadium site. However, the Stadium was strongly supported by Bloomberg, who insisted that there was no alternate site for the Olympic Stadium and the project needed to be approved before the International Olympic Committee selected the Host City on July 6, 2005. Finally, on June 6, 2005, the Public Authorities Control Board rejected New York State's $300 million contribution for the project, eliminating the possibility that an Olympic Stadium on that site would be fully approved before the IOC's vote.

The City, working with NYC2012, quickly developed a backup plan, which called for a new ballpark for the New York Mets in Queens in the parking lot of Shea Stadium – later named Citi Field – to be completed for the 2009 baseball season; it was announced on June 12, 2005. The plan would've been to use the stadium for the 2012 Olympics while the Mets would play at Yankee Stadium in the Bronx for that year's baseball season.

== Post-bid development ==
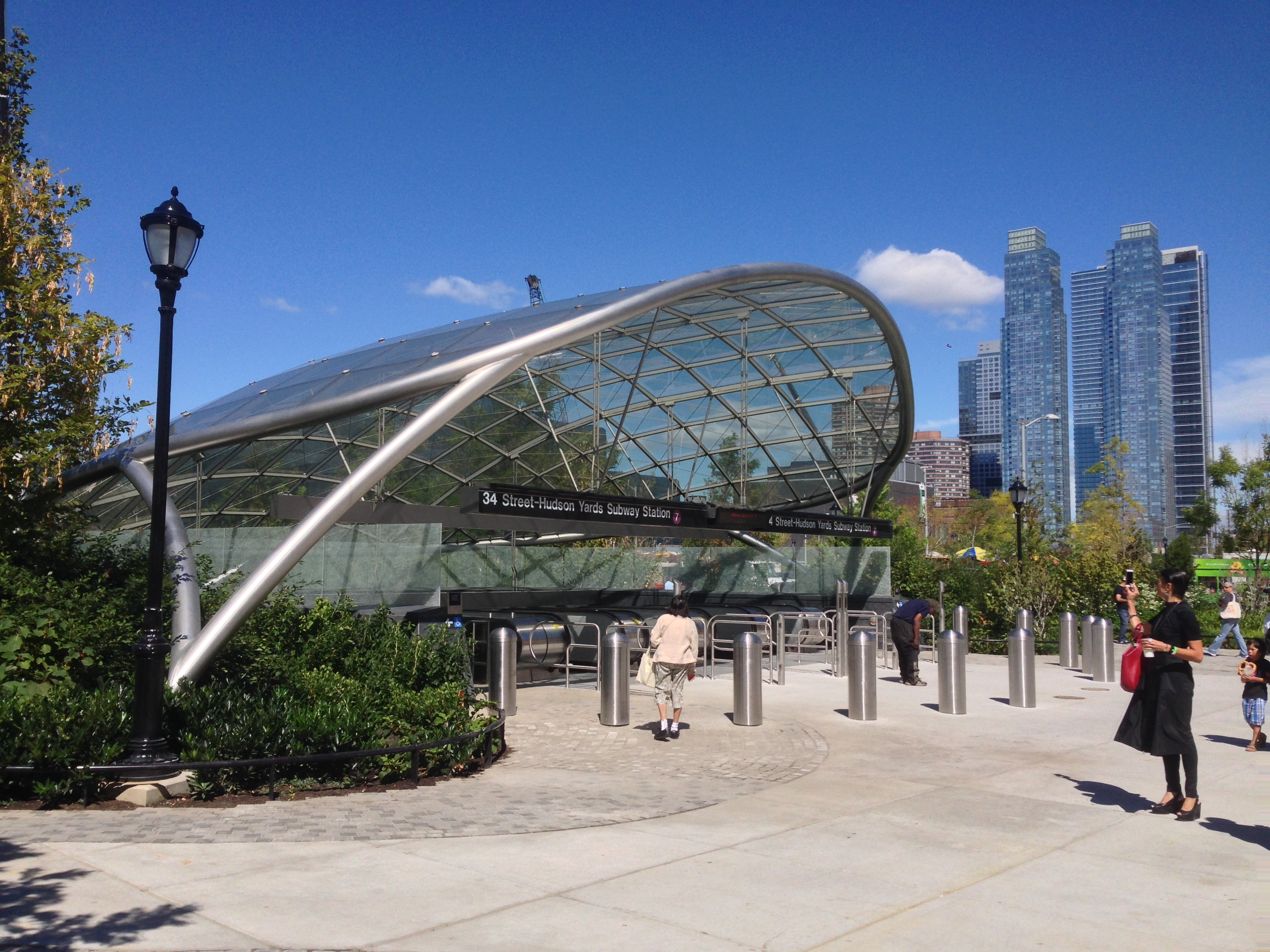
The legacy of the bid saw the opening of the 34th Street–Hudson Yards station which extended the 7 Train.

Despite the bid's failure the greatest legacy of the NYC2012 bid has been large-scale development of areas of New York City that underwent rezoning in order to move forward with the NYC2012 bid. Manhattan's Hudson Yards and Brooklyn's waterfront in Williamsburg and Greenpoint both underwent rezoning revisions which were in part due to the region's planned roles as Olympic venues, including the controversial West Side Stadium. (The 7 Subway Extension, which was originally planned for the 2012 Olympic bid, was revised to serve the Hudson Yards Redevelopment Project.) The development of the once industrial Queens West neighborhood on the East River may also have origins in the bid, as it was initially slated for development as the planned site of the Olympic Village. Following the Games, the site was to be bought by private developers and converted into condominiums.

=== Potential future bids ===
Upon the USOC reaching a new revenue sharing agreement with the IOC in May 2012, New York had been mentioned as a potential candidate for the 2024 Summer Olympics, but then-Mayor Bill de Blasio decided not to pursue a bid in May 2014. Los Angeles became the US candidate following the withdrawal of Boston's bid. Los Angeles later secured the right to host the 2028 Summer Olympics while Paris (which competed with New York in the 2012 race) secured the 2024 Summer Olympics.

In March 2026, the state of New York started exploring the possibility of a joint New York City-Lake Placid bid for a future edition of the Winter Olympics. Lake Placid previously hosted the 1932 and 1980 Winter Olympics. In June 2026, Governor Kathy Hochul formed an exploratory committee to study a potential bid for the 2042 Winter Olympics.

=== Citi Field & Etihad Park ===
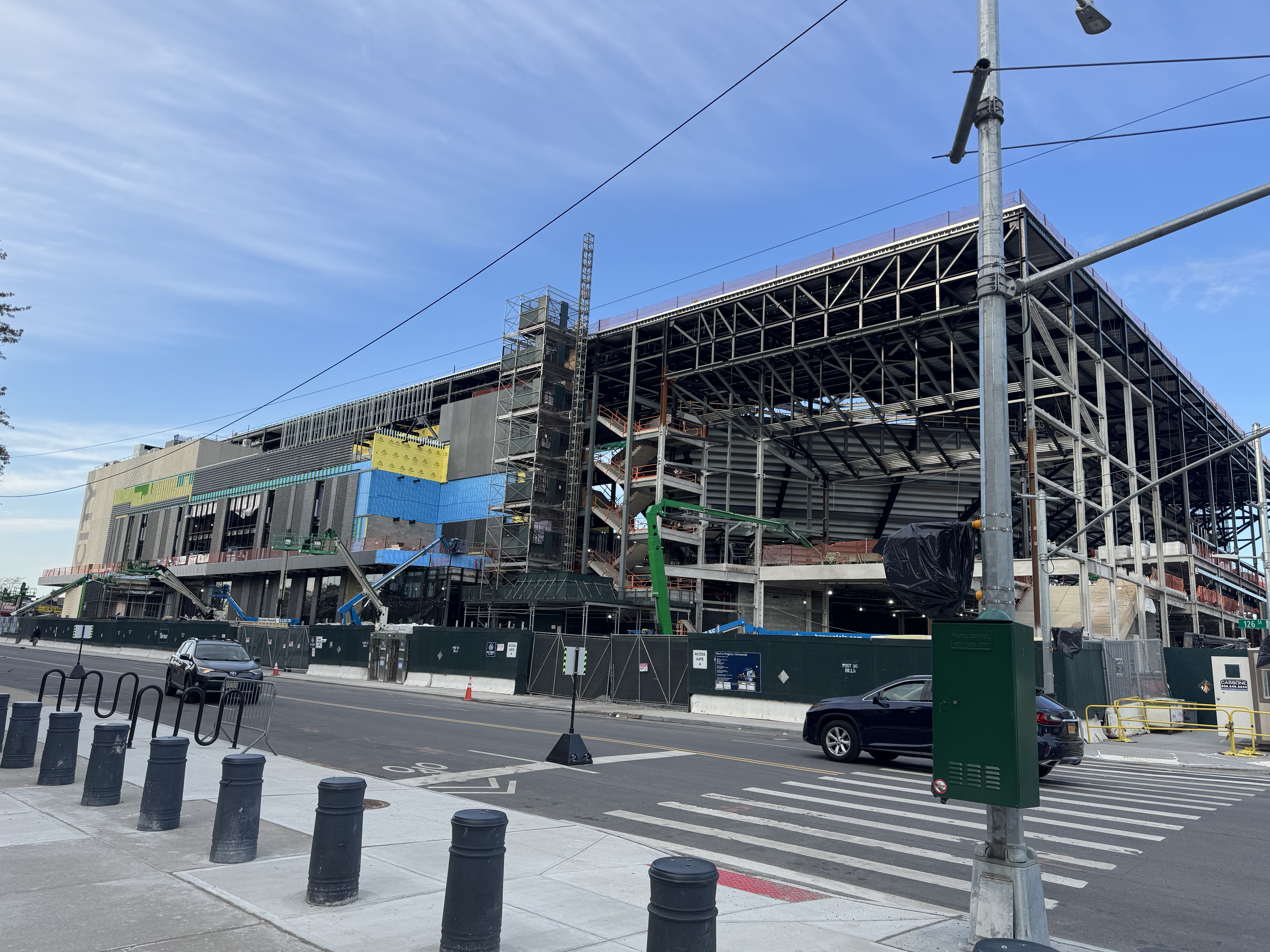
Etihad Park will host nine soccer matches during the 2028 Summer Olympics.

After the Olympic bid failed, the construction of Citi Field in Queens, now designated as the new home of the New York Mets, went on as scheduled; the Mets played their first game in the stadium in April 2009.

Adjacent to Citi Field, a new 25,000 seat, soccer-specific stadium, Etihad Park is being built for New York City FC of Major League Soccer and Gotham FC of the National Women’s Soccer League. It is being built in Willets Point and the surrounding area will be redeveloped. The new stadium will open in 2027 and host nine Olympic soccer matches during the 2028 Summer Olympics.

=== Flushing Meadows Natatorium ===
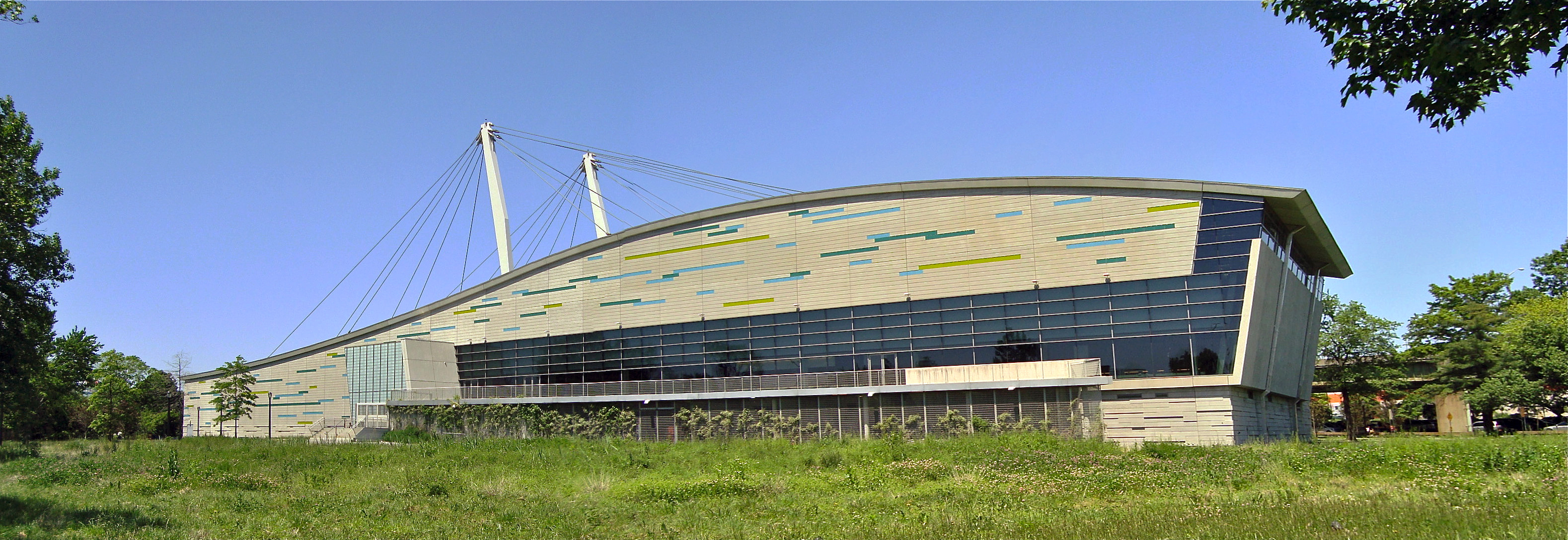
The exterior of the Flushing Meadows Natatorium.

Despite the bid's failure, construction of an aquatics center at Flushing Meadow Park went ahead. The Flushing Meadows Natatorium opened in 2008.

=== MetLife Stadium ===
After the West Side Stadium proposal was rejected, the NFL's New York Jets entered into a 50/50 partnership with the New York Giants to build a new stadium in East Rutherford, New Jersey to replace Giants Stadium. The New Meadowlands Stadium (now MetLife Stadium) opened in 2010 and hosted Super Bowl XLVIII in 2014. It hosted eight matches during the 2026 FIFA World Cup including the final.

=== Barclays Center ===
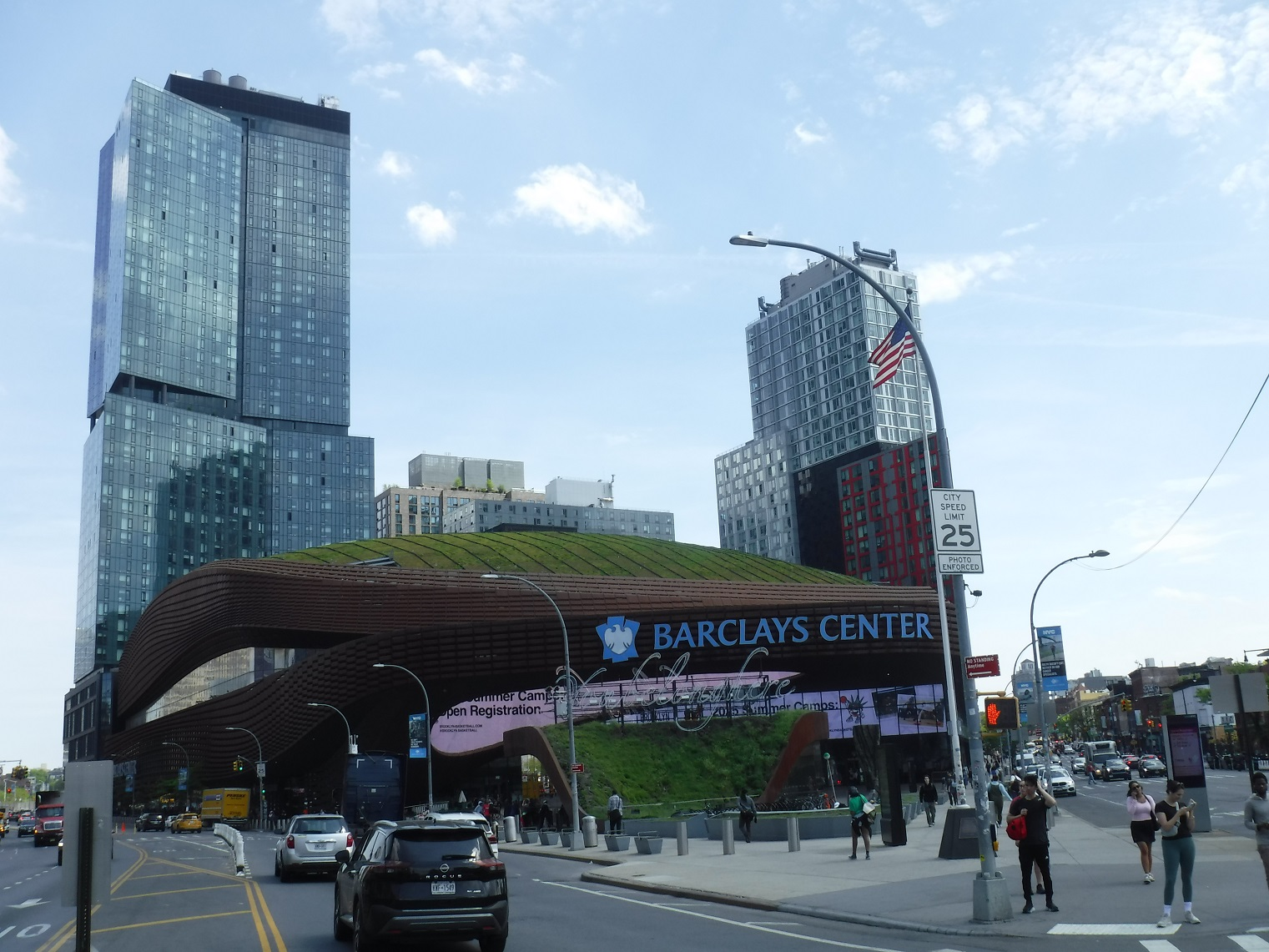
The Barclays Center became the home of the Brooklyn Nets.

The opening of the Barclays Center (which was the proposed venue for gymnastics) ushered in the return of professional sports franchises to Brooklyn for the first time since the Brooklyn Dodgers left in 1957. The Barclays Center is the home of the NBA's Brooklyn Nets and the WNBA's New York Liberty and used to be a part-time home of the NHL's New York Islanders.

=== Hudson Yards ===
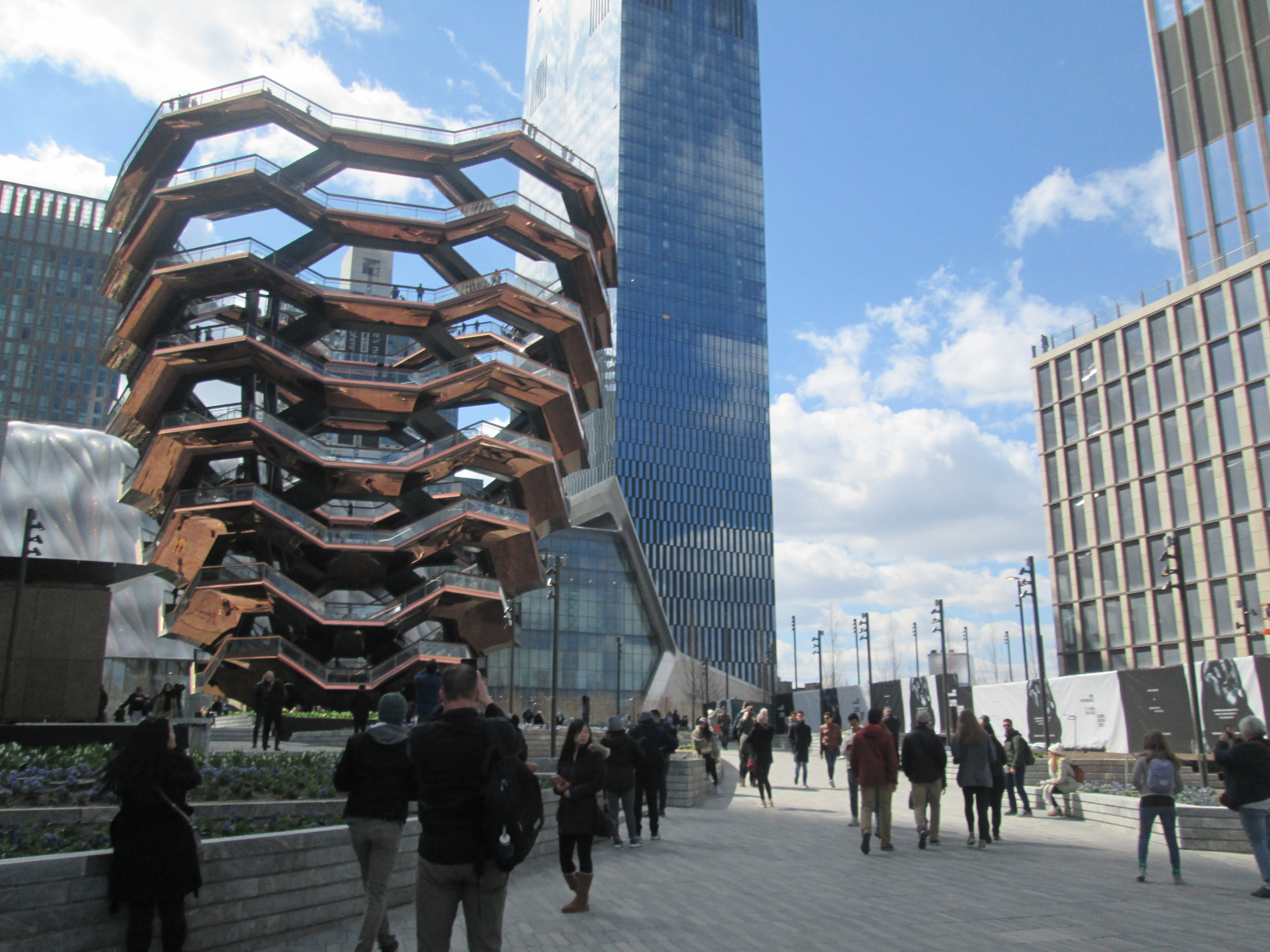
A public plaza at Hudson Yards, with The Vessel

Despite the failure to approve the West Side Stadium, the site of the West Side Rail Yards still saw development. The Hudson Yards Redevelopment Project saw the construction of multiple buildings and mixed-use developments which has led to the creation of a new neighborhood. The new buildings feature office space and residential space. A shopping mall was also opened as part of the project.

Renovations were made to the Javits Center (which would have hosted multiple Olympic events) and the 7 Train was extended to its current terminal at 34th Street. The High Line originates at the Hudson Yards and is an elevated urban park built on former train tracks.

Wynn Resorts had proposed to build an 80 story resort and casino with 1,750 rooms at the Hudson Yards. It would have been constructed on the site of where the West Side Stadium would have been built, but Wynn withdrew its proposal in May 2025.

== See also ==
- United States bids for the Olympic Games
