= Javits Center =

Convention center in Manhattan, New York

Jacob K. Javits Convention Center

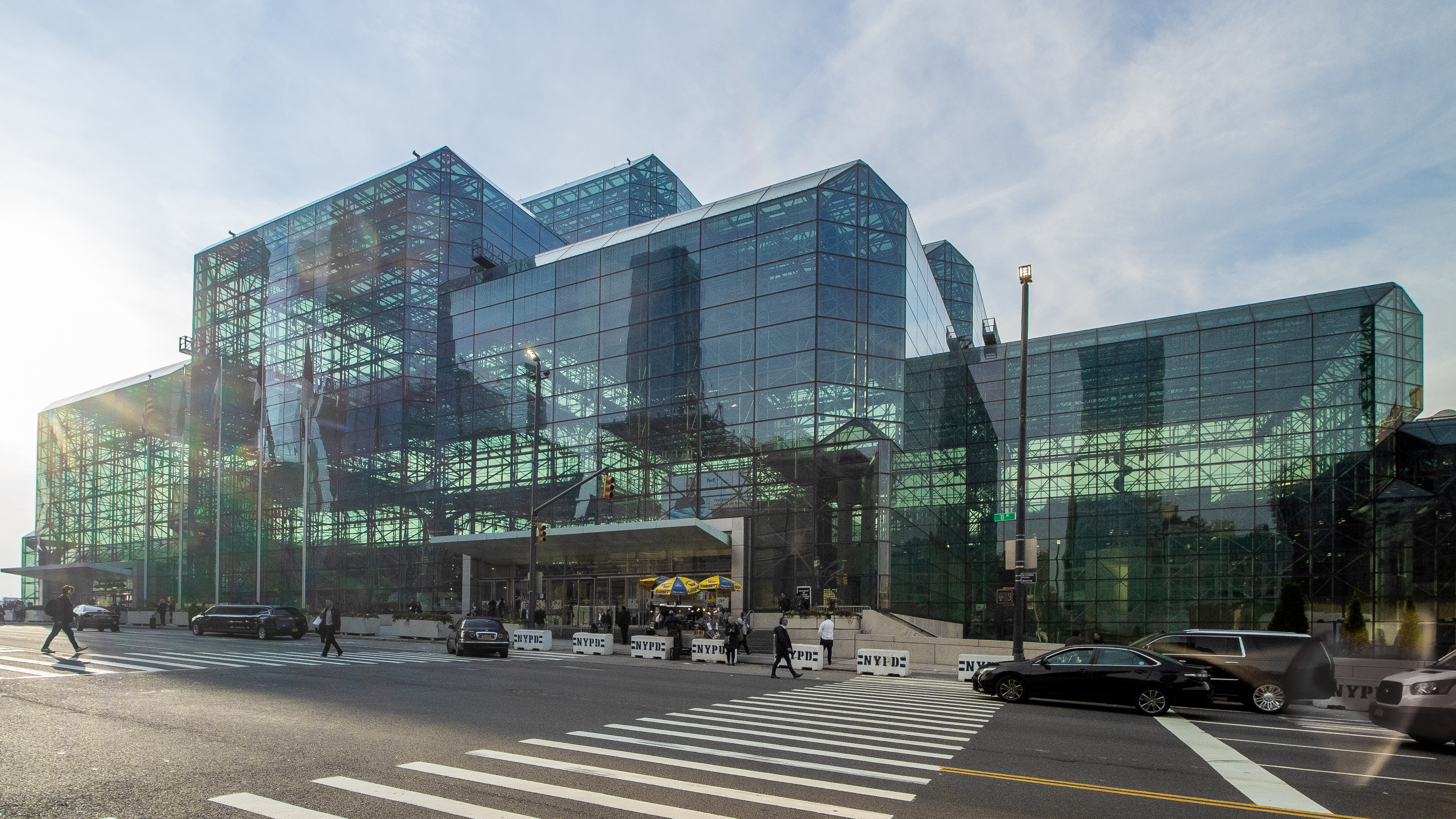
- 36th Street entrance
- Interactive map of Jacob K. Javits Convention Center
- Former names: New York Convention and Exhibition Center
- Address: 655 West 34th Street
- Location: Manhattan, New York City, New York, USA 10001
- Coordinates: 40°45′27″N 74°00′09″W
- Operator: New York City Convention Center Operating Corporation
- Public transit: New York City Subway: at 34th Street-Hudson Yards; New York City Bus: M12, M34 SBS

Construction
- Built: 1979–1986
- Opened: April 3, 1986; 40 years ago
- Renovated: 2006–2013
- Expanded: 2013

Website
- www.javitscenter.com

The Jacob K. Javits Convention Center, commonly known as the Javits Center, is a large convention center on Eleventh Avenue between 34th Street and 38th Street in Hell's Kitchen, Manhattan, New York City. It was designed by architect James Ingo Freed of Pei Cobb Freed & Partners. The space frame structure was constructed from 1979 to 1986 and was named to honor Jacob Javits, the United States senator for New York. When the Javits Center opened, it replaced the New York Coliseum at Columbus Circle as the city's major convention facility; the Coliseum was subsequently demolished and replaced by Time Warner Center.

The Javits Center is operated and maintained by the New York Convention Center Operating Corporation, a New York State public-benefit corporation. As of 2021, the Javits Center has a total interior area of 3.3 million square feet (310,000 m^{2}). It is billed as one of the busiest convention centers in the United States. It has undergone expansions throughout its history, with the most recent expansion being completed in 2021 and adding 1.2 million square feet to the building. Plans have also been made for the Javits Center to have panels providing solar power.

== Organization ==
The New York Convention Center Operating Corporation (NYCCOC) – not to be confused with the New York Convention Center Development Corporation ("CCDC"), which is a subsidiary of Empire State Development – operates the Javits Center. NYCCOC's management team is headed by President and CEO Alan Steel. There is a 16-member board that provides guidance. In 2017, NYCCOC had operating expenses of $194 million and employed 3,786 people.

== Use and components ==
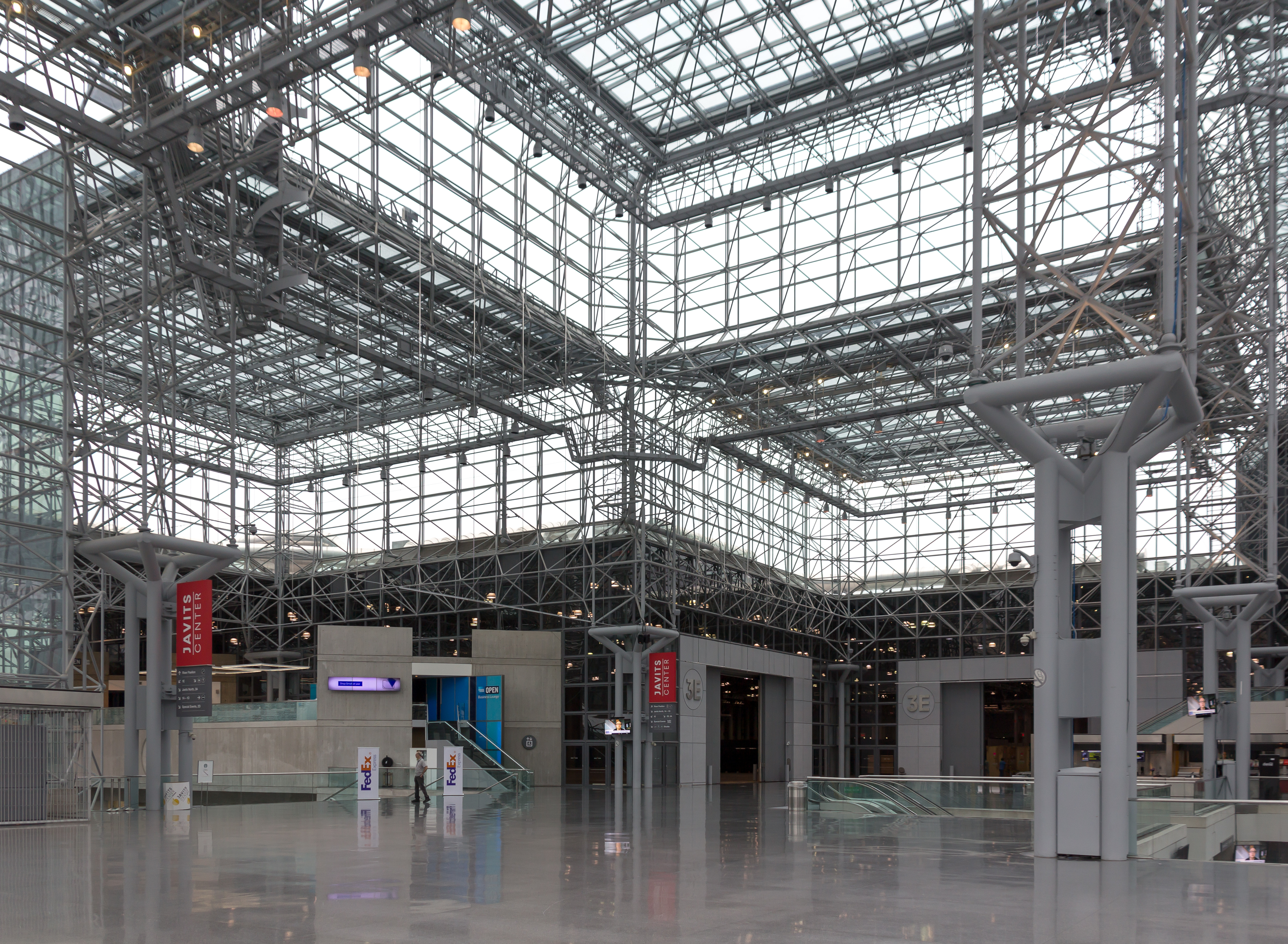
Inside of Center, 2017

Javits Center has hosted annual events such as the New York International Auto Show the New York Comic Con, and Anime NYC. In November 2016, it was the location of Hillary Clinton's 2016 United States presidential election watching venue.

The complex includes a:

- 500,000-square-foot (46,000 m^{2}) Upper Exhibition Hall
- 250,000-square-foot (23,000 m^{2}) Lower Exhibition Hall
- 100,000-square-foot (9,300 m^{2}) Special Events Hall (seating capacity 3,800), 102 meeting rooms
- 63,000-square-foot (5,900 m^{2}) cafeteria/restaurant/lounge
- 75,000-square-foot (7,000 m^{2}) concourse (1,000 by 90 by 75 feet (305 m × 27 m × 23 m))
- 65,000-square-foot (6,000 m^{2}) Crystal Palace (270 by 270 by 180 feet (82 m × 82 m × 55 m))
- 60,000-square-foot (5,600 m^{2}) Galleria (360 by 90 by 90 feet (110 m × 27 m × 27 m))
- 23,400-square-foot (2,170 m^{2}) River Pavilion (270 by 90 by 135 feet (82 m × 27 m × 41 m))
- 50 loading docks on two levels
- 1.1-acre (0.45 ha) public plaza with water walls and pedestrian link under 11th Avenue
- 60,000 square feet (5,600 m^{2}) of surface parking for 140 cars

The Javits Center added 1.2 million square feet (110,000 m^{2}) following a major expansion project which was completed in May 2021. This included 500,000 square feet (46,000 m^{2}) of contiguous event space, which will help the facility attract international business conferences. As of this expansion, the Javits Center has a total interior area of 3.3 million square feet (310,000 m^{2}).

== Early history ==
=== Planning ===
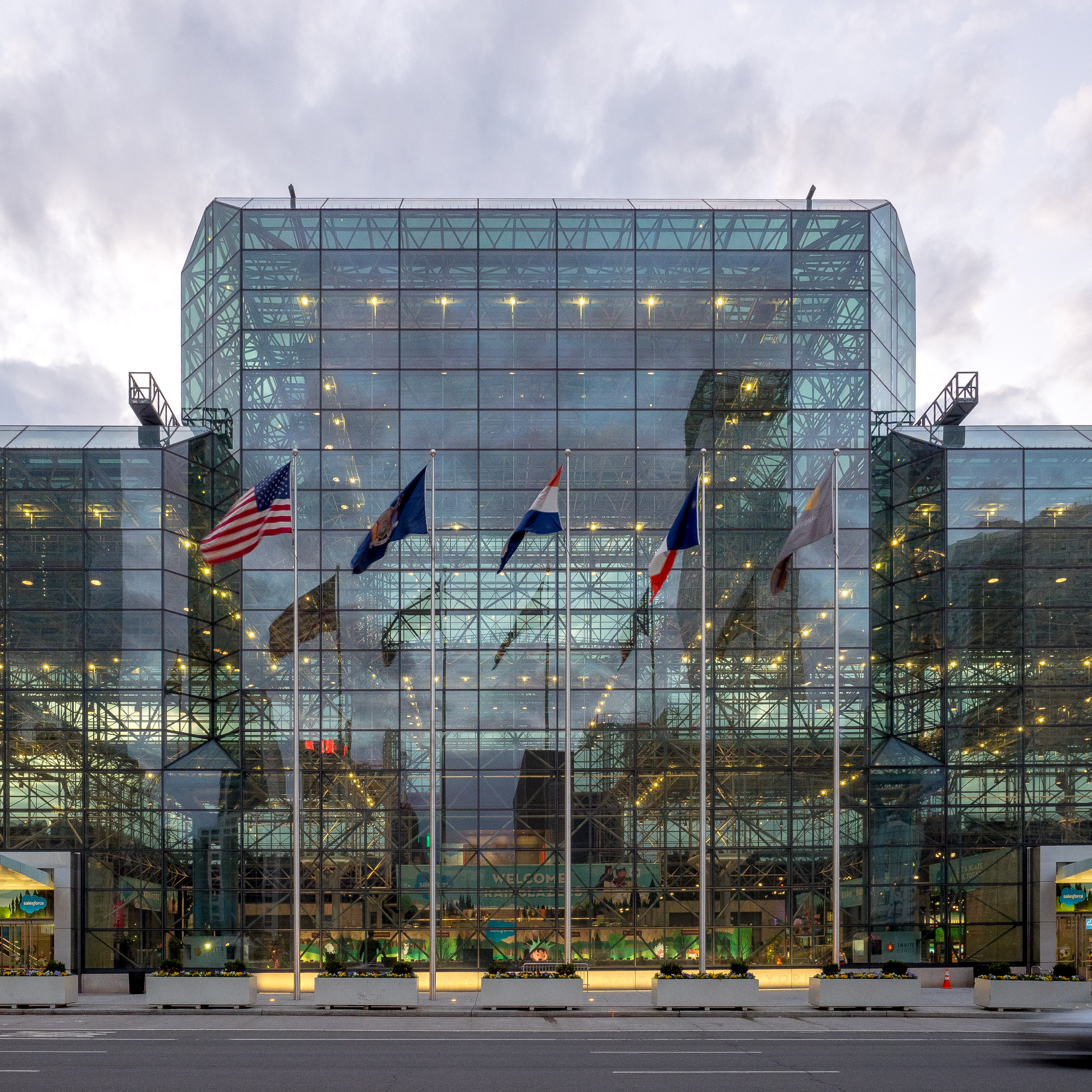
The main plaza at the Javits Center

Planning and constructing a convention center on Manhattan's west side has had a long and controversial history. Proposals for a convention center to replace the New York Coliseum on Columbus Circle date to 1962, only six years after the Coliseum was completed. A new convention center over the river between 38th and 42nd Streets was included in the city's 1962 plan for the West Side waterfront. Several other sites were subsequently studied, including the New York Central rail yard between Tenth and Eleventh Avenues (now known as the Eastern Rail Yard site at Hudson Yards) and the west 50s between Eighth and Ninth avenues.

Eventually the Lindsay administration included a new convention center between 10th and 11th avenues in the west 40s along with an extensive redevelopment of the West Side in their 1969–70 Plan for New York City. Opposition to the massive residential displacement that this development project would have caused, and the failure of the city to complete any replacement housing, led the State Legislature to kill the convention center proposal in 1970. The City then moved the convention center site to the Hudson River, in place of Piers 84 and 86, despite the high cost of foundations and the lack of space for future expansion. That 44th Street convention center, designed by Gordon Bunshaft of Skidmore, Owings & Merrill, was approved by the Board of Estimate in 1973 despite renewed opposition from the local community. In exchange, the community received a special zoning district that offered some protection from development. The 44th Street convention center was never built because of the 1975 New York City fiscal crisis, which led instead to a search by the city and state governments for a less expensive site with some opportunity for expansion.

The city and state identified three sites for a convention center: the Penn Central rail yard between 11th and 12th Avenues north of 34th Street; Battery Park City; and in the west 40s near Times Square, somewhere between 6th and 7th Avenues or 7th and 8th Avenues. The Battery Park City site was rejected because it was considered to be too far from midtown hotels. The Times Square plan, by the Regional Plan Association, was not seriously considered by the city. The rail yard site was originally proposed by the local community to avoid direct residential displacement that would be caused by office and residential development associated with the convention center. As an alternative to forestall the negative impacts of both, Daniel Gutman, an environmental planner working with the Clinton Planning Council, proposed that the convention center and all major development be located south of 42nd Street.

Concurrently, in July 1974, Donald Trump's company Trump Enterprises Inc. offered to buy an option on the 100-acre (40 ha) 60th Street Yard and the 44-acre (18 ha) 30th Street Yard for a combined $100 million; the sale to Trump was approved in U.S. federal court in March 1975. Following the sale. Trump offered to build a convention center for $110 million on the site of the 30th Street Yard. In December 1975, Trump hired Der Scutt to design a convention center on the 30th Street Yard's site. The 1.5-million-square-foot (140,000 m^{2}) structure would have included a 500,000-square-foot (46,000 m^{2}) main exhibit floor; a banquet hall, restaurants, and meeting rooms on the second floor; and a tennis club and solar-heat equipment on the roof. He offered to waive his fee—provided he could name the structure for his family. The city and state governments eventually chose the rail yard site. Although Trump's offer to build the Convention Center was rejected, he was paid a broker's commission by Penn Central.

=== Construction ===
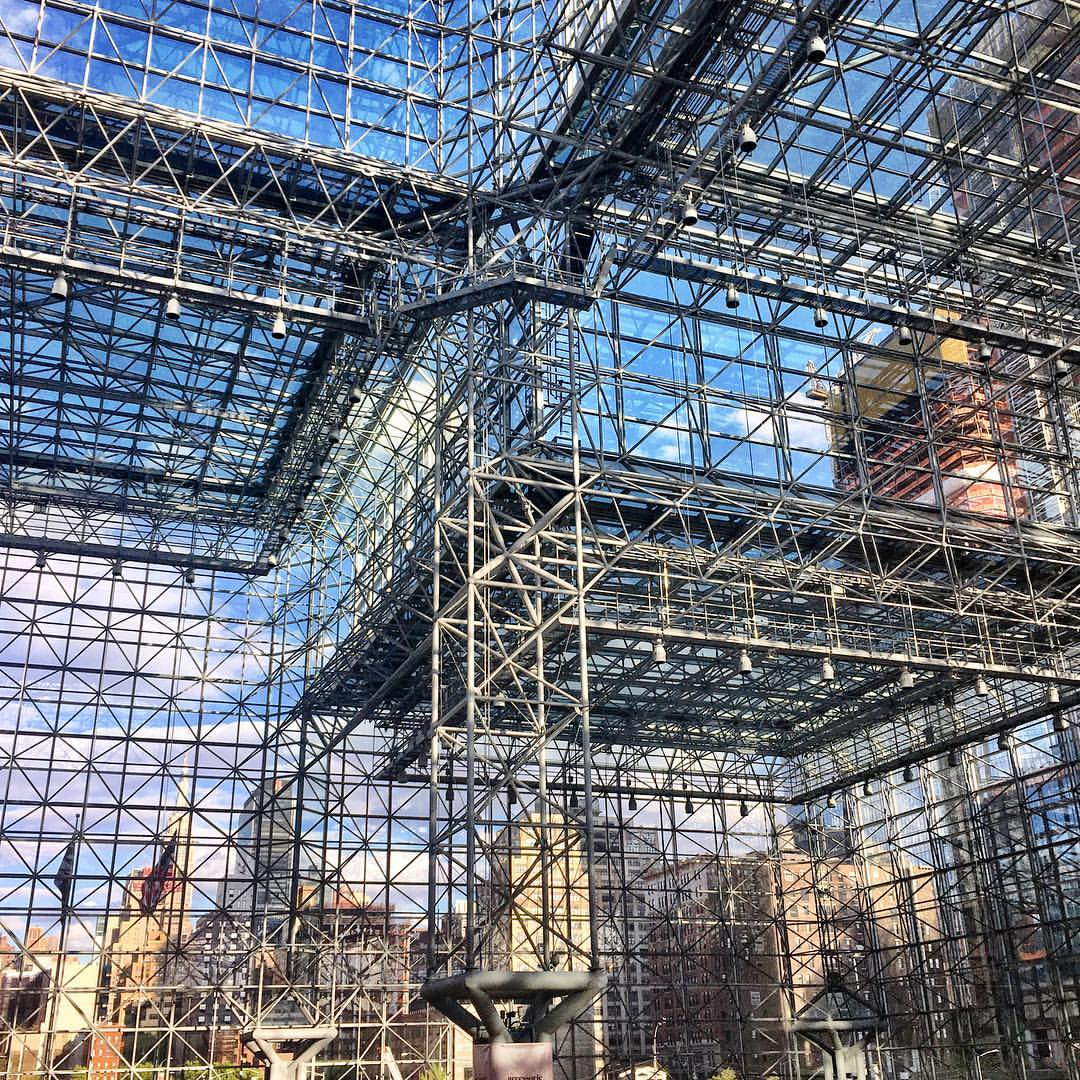
Metal and glass building shell, 2017

In March 1979, the New York State Legislature approved a plan to allocate $375 million toward the construction of the convention center near the Penn Central yard. The next month, the architectural firm I. M. Pei and Partners was selected to build the New York Convention and Exhibition Center, as it was called at that time. Immediately after the center's construction was announced, real estate prices in the area increased. Properties that previously had trouble selling suddenly had several potential buyers, spurring real estate speculation. Designs for the center were revealed in December 1979. In March 1980, a few squatters on the site were evicted so the site's structures could be demolished to make room for the New York Convention Center. The ground-breaking ceremony for the center was held on June 18 of that year. In October 1980, the MTA issued $100 million in bonds to pay for the center's construction.

The New York Convention Center Development Corporation (CCDC), which was building the Convention Center, proposed building a promenade with restaurants and shops on the building's west side, facing the Hudson River shore. It would also be open year-round, as opposed to other convention centers. At the time, the presence of the Convention Center was supposed to garner $82 million in annual city and state taxes, and the events at the center would allow the city to net $832 million annually. However, a report commissioned by the CCDC found that the center's benefits to the surrounding neighborhood would be reduced due to a lack of public transit and the predominantly industrial zoning of the area. Jerry Lowery was hired to find conventions to host at the New York Convention Center. By late 1981, he had booked 171 conventions for the Convention Center between mid-1984 and late 1986.

The problems with the center's construction started in 1982, when it was revealed that there were difficulties in manufacturing the custom parts for the Convention Center's structure. In March 1983, officials stated that the Convention Center was facing cost overruns of at least $16.8 million. The next month, officials announced that the cost overruns had risen to between $25 million and $50 million, and that the center's opening had been postponed to at least 1985. In order to reduce the delay, workers were ordered to speed up construction. Lowery described the delay as "disastrous" for the city, since the delays left the city vulnerable to lawsuits from the hosts of the 141 conventions that were scheduled to be hosted at the Convention Center through the end of 1985.

By April 1984, the opening date had been delayed further to mid-1986. At the time, Governor Mario Cuomo stated that the center would have a new name by the time it opened. He said, "It should be reasonably utterable and easy to write. It should be a name that's going to identify it with New York as much as possible." In December 1984, at Cuomo's suggestion, the CCDC officially renamed the New York Convention Center to honor former Senator Jacob K. Javits. The Javits Center was topped out on December 19, 1984.

The center was opened on April 3, 1986. The opening of the Javits Center was accompanied by a five-minute ribbon-cutting ceremony. The first exhibitions to be hosted at the Javits Center were the International Fur Fair and an Art Expo of "emerging younger artists". A week later, a formal ribbon-cutting was held, with Governor Cuomo, Mayor Ed Koch, and Javits's widow Marian Javits in attendance.

=== Mafia charges ===
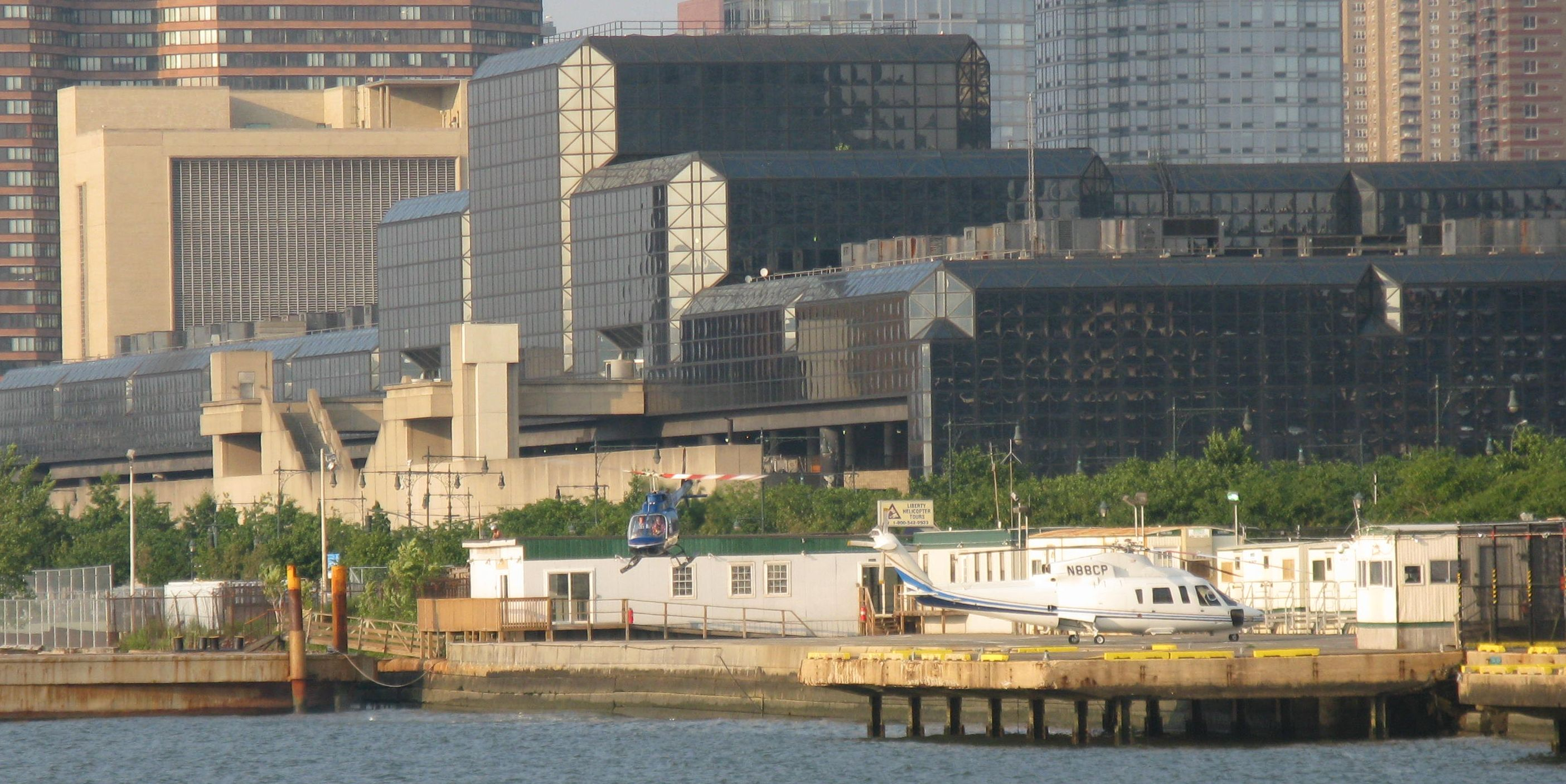
West 30th Street Heliport with the Javits Center in the background, 2009

In 1995, the Independent Review Board charged that jobs at the center had come under Mafia control. A New York Times article stated:

From the day the center opened in 1986 ... Robert Rabbitt Sr. and his son Michael gave the work mainly to people with mob connections, to relatives and friends of organized-crime figures and to relatives and friends of union officers, the panel said.

The jobs at the center were reserved for members of Local 807 of the International Brotherhood of Teamsters, who were paid up to $350 a day for working on a Sunday. Other local members who work outside the center are usually paid less than $100 a day, the panel said.

The panel, the Independent Review Board, which investigates corruption in the union, reported that the Rabbitts also tried to engineer a deal that would let Robert Rabbitt control the jobs after serving a prison sentence, and would give his son $236,000 as severance pay from companies that do business at the center.

== Expansions ==
=== 2006–2010 expansion ===
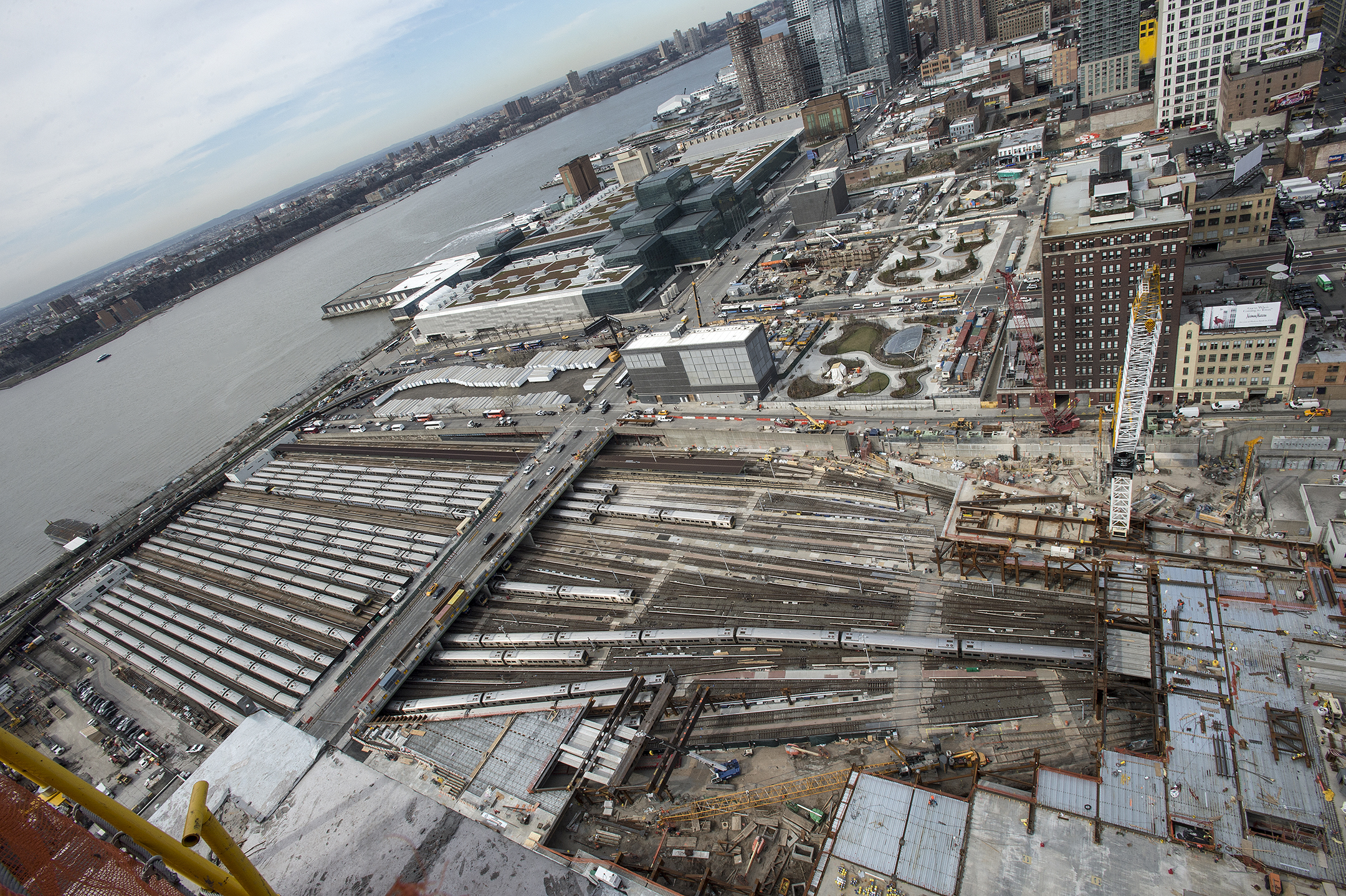
The Javits Center (upper center) is located between the Hudson River and the New York City Subway's 34th Street–Hudson Yards station, next to the Long Island Rail Road's West Side Yard (foreground) and 34th Street terminus of the High Line elevated park (far left). 2015.

On October 16, 2006, a groundbreaking ceremony was held to mark the symbolic start of a $1.7 billion expansion project. The project, which would have expanded the center's size by 45 percent, was scheduled for completion by 2010. Architect Richard Rogers led the design team, and Leslie E. Robertson Associates were the structural engineers. However, the physical constraints on the project site imposed by the Bloomberg administration complicated the design and caused the cost to soar to $5 billion. To address the site constraint, an alternative plan produced in 2007 by Meta Brunzema, an architect, and Daniel Gutman, an environmental planner, for the Hell's Kitchen Neighborhood Association would have expanded the Javits Center south over the Western Rail Yard, the site of the defeated West Side Stadium. Other features of the HKNA plan included a rooftop park, office and residential towers at the corners of the new exhibition hall, and conversion of Pier 76 to public use. In the end, the mayor proposed rezoning the Western Rail Yard site for commercial and residential development as part of the Hudson Yards.

=== 2010–2014 renovation ===
In April 2008, Governor David Paterson decided to renovate the existing Javits building with a severely revised budget of $465 million. The renovation, started in 2010, was led by design team FXFOWLE Epstein, whose redesign of the Javits Center's interior focused on upgrading organization and efficiency, as well as occupant comfort. The more transparent curtain wall, less opaque skylight systems, and light gray paint on the space frame have dramatically transformed the voluminous public spaces. New mechanical systems have improved the indoor air quality, reduced ambient noise, and significantly saved on energy consumption. The diamond-patterned Tuscan red terrazzo of the original floor has been replaced with soft tones of gray terrazzo. A new high-performance curtain wall has simplified and lightened the aesthetics of the original façade by changing the façade's module from 5 by 5 feet (1.5 m × 1.5 m) to 5 by 10 feet (1.5 m × 3.0 m). This allowed for the introduction of more transparent glass with minimal structurally glazed mullions. Solid stainless steel panels replaced the opaque portions of glass to better express the building's functionality. The renovation was completed in November 2013. The expansion was meant to retain old tenants coming back annually, such as the New York Boat Show. In January 2014, it was revealed that the new roof was still leaking after the expansion. The roof of the new expansion was turned into a 6.75-acre sedum green roof, making it the second-largest extensive green roof in the U.S. The green roof was finished in 2014, and research on the rooftop after its completion has reported increased biodiversity, absorption and retention of rainwater runoff, and cooling.

In January 2012, Governor Andrew Cuomo announced plans to construct a new convention center on the site of Aqueduct Racetrack in Queens and redevelop the Javits Center site with a mix of commercial space and apartments, similar to Battery Park City. However, Cuomo's plan was quickly scuttled due to disagreements over space in the Aqueduct Racetrack area. More Javits Center renovations are being eyed, with $15 million already going toward a new telephone system and improved Wi-Fi network in the building, as well as a truck idling area to the west and south being proposed for further expansion.

The newly expanded Javits Center is served by the New York City Subway 7 and <7> trains at the 34th Street–Hudson Yards station, which was built as part of the 7 Subway Extension in anticipation for the adjoining Hudson Yards Redevelopment Project. The station opened on September 13, 2015. The expanded Javits Center, along with the completed High Line, the new Hudson Park and Boulevard, and the subway extension, are facilitating the development of Hudson Yards.

=== 2016–2021 expansion ===
In January 2016, Governor Cuomo announced that Javits Center would be expanded to 3,300,000 ft^{2} (310,000 m^{2}) at a cost of US$1.5 billion. Javits North, a "semi-permanent structure" at the north end, would be demolished and replaced by a new glass building with "meeting rooms, new exhibition halls and outdoor space". 1,200,000 square feet (110,000 m^{2}), including about 100,000 square feet (9,300 m^{2}) of exhibition space, would be added. The consortium chosen was of project manager Lendlease and Turner Construction. The expansion was intended to make Javits Center a more competitive location for conventions and events compared to other cities' convention centers. There were also no hotels near Javits Center, which led some convention planners to decide against holding their events there. A groundbreaking ceremony was held in March 2017. Initially, the expansion was scheduled to be completed in March 2021.

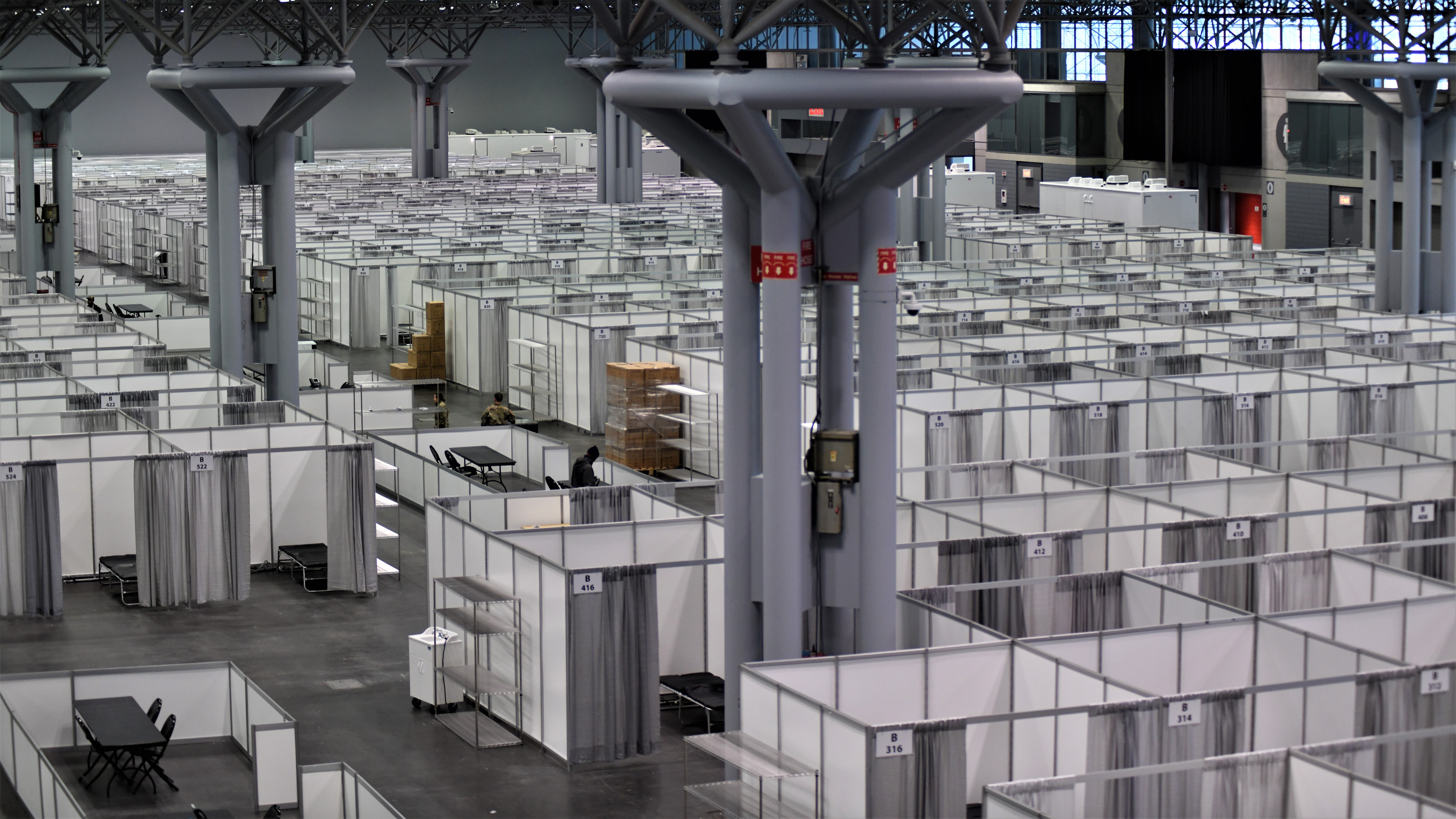
The "Javits New York Medical Station", a field hospital set up in the Javits Center, April 2020 during the COVID-19 pandemic

In March 2020, amid the COVID-19 pandemic in New York City, the Javits Center was adapted for use as a temporary 2,000-bed alternate care site to treat COVID-19 patients, though the number of beds was later expanded to 2,910. The field hospital was ultimately little-used. A total of slightly under 1,100 COVID-19 patients were treated at the Javits Center. The field hospital, administered by FEMA, closed in May 2020 after one surge of New York City cases passed; the few dozen patients remaining were transferred to other hospitals in the city. The facilities were not completely dismantled, in case they were needed for a subsequent wave. In October 2020, Linda Diaz and her band became the first musicians to perform atop the Javits Center, which they used for an NPR Tiny Desk Concert; the band could not access the NPR studio in Washington, D.C., due to risk of transmission of COVID-19. In 2021, the Javits Center was used as a COVID-19 mass vaccination site; on three consecutive days in March 2021, the location set a national record for number of vaccinations administered in a single day (reaching up to 14,000 people).

The COVID-19 pandemic had started just as the Javits Center expansion was being completed. All of the large conventions scheduled to take place between March 2020 and mid-2021 were canceled or postponed because of Javits Center's use as a field hospital and then a vaccination site. The pandemic resulted in a loss of about $200 million in expected profits. Even so, the Javits Center expansion was only delayed by two months. Construction of the expansion was completed within budget on May 11, 2021. Plans were made to construct 3,000 solar panels on the new and existing roofs of the building as well.

== See also ==
- Albany Convention Center
- Battery Park City Authority
- Empire State Development Corporation
- Hudson River Park Trust
- Olympic Regional Development Authority
- United Nations Development Corporation
- West Side Stadium

| Preceded by The Theatre at Madison Square Garden | Venues of the NFL draft 2005 | Succeeded by Radio City Music Hall |
