= Linda Diaz =

2020 NPR Tiny Desk Contest winner

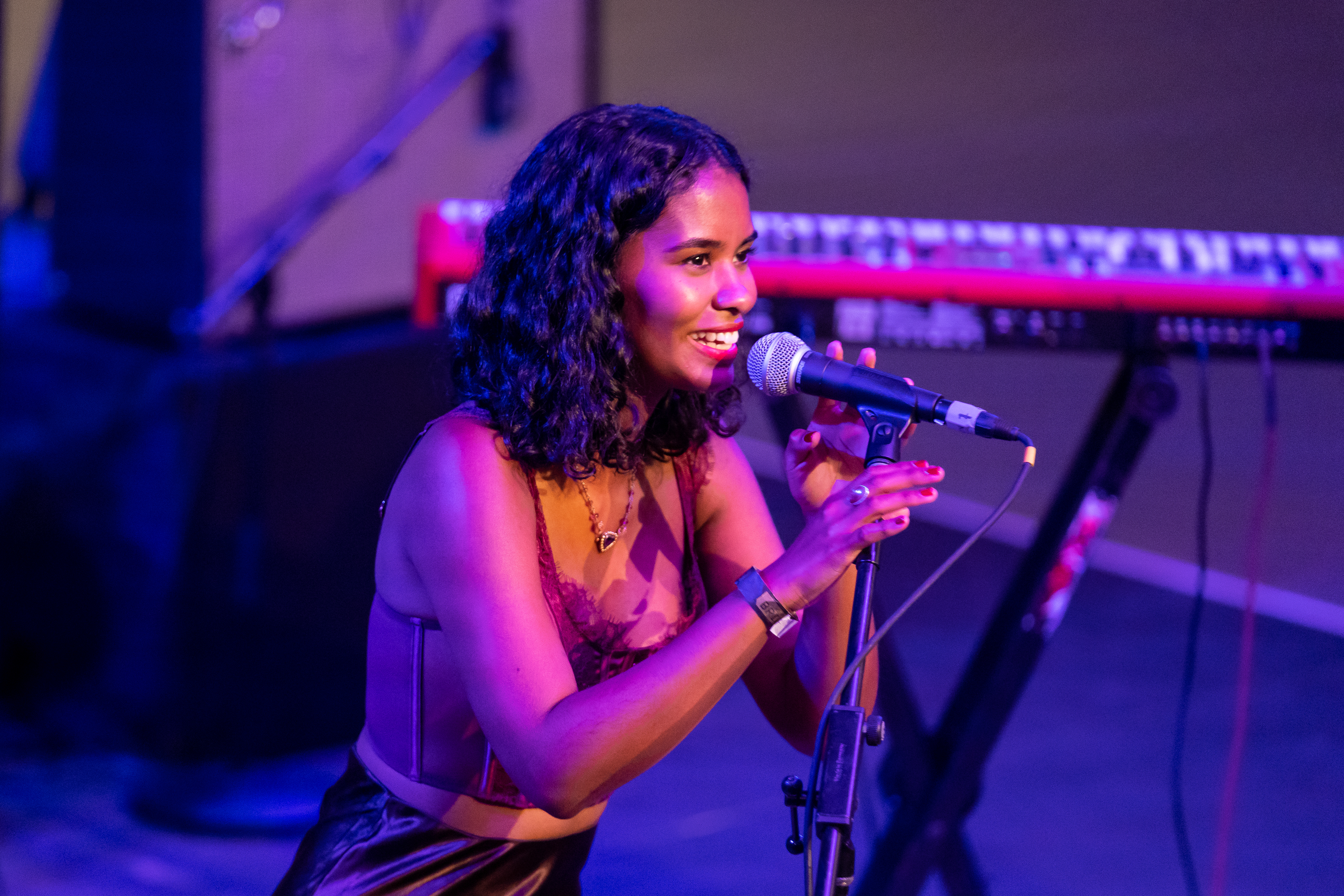
- Diaz performing at the 2021 BRIC JazzFest
- Born: 1995 (age 30–31)
- Musical career
- Genres: Pop, R&B
- Instrument: Vocals
- Chess career
- Country: United States
- Peak rating: 2016 (September 2011)

Linda Victoria Diaz is an American singer-songwriter and chess player.

She is a co-host of the PBS music education series Sound Field. In 2020, she won the NPR Tiny Desk Contest with her song "Green Tea Ice Cream".

== Music career ==
Diaz released her debut single "Flowers in the Concrete" featuring Akinyemi, in November 2018, with "Fall in Love" being her next single in February 2019. Later that same month, on February 25, she released her debut EP V.

In December 2019, ten months after the V EP, Diaz released her second EP, Magic. Earmilk wrote that the record, "captivates listeners with a classic neo-soul aura that's rife with smooth keys and lush guitar riffs. Diaz's shimmering vocals paint a vivid picture of the day she fell in love and has us feeling the same upon first listen."

In January 2020, Diaz was a backup singer for Jordan Rakei during his NPR Tiny Desk Concert.

In August 2020, she won the NPR Tiny Desk Contest with her song "Green Tea Ice Cream", beating over 6,000 entries. Diaz wrote the track during a year when her grandfather died, she was broken up with, and she was laid off, forcing her to reckon with what she valued and what she needed to move forward. Tiny Desk producer, Bobby Carter, said, "Linda stood out in a crop of thousands of talented musicians, but I knew early on that she was the one to beat. Her tone, her message and the band’s overall musical presentation were simply undeniable."

Due to the risks of COVID-19, NPR stopped hosting Tiny Desk Concerts in its D.C. studio in 2020 and 2021. In the interim, Tiny Desk continued its series as "Tiny Desk (Home) Concerts", where artists recorded sets in their home locations. In October 2020, Diaz's concert was published, with her and her band performing on the top of the Javits Center, the first musicians to ever do so.

In September 2020, Diaz's singing was featured in a Toyota commercial that aired during the VMAs with J Balvin.

Since 2021, Diaz began co-hosting the PBS music education series Sound Field, together with Arthur Buckner.

== Discography ==
=== Extended plays ===
List of extended plays, with release date and label shown
Title	Details
V	Released: February 25, 2019; Label: Self-released; Format: Digital download
Magic	Released: December 13, 2019; Label: Self-released; Format: Digital download

=== Singles ===
List of singles, showing year released and album name
Title	Year	Album
"Flowers in the Concrete" (featuring Akinyemi)	2018	V
"Fall in Love"	2019	V
"Honesty"	2019	Magic
"Ready 4 U"	2019	Magic
"Magic"	2019	Magic
"Green Tea Ice Cream"	2020	Magic
"Good Thing" (with Elijah Fox, Aligo and Marie Dahlstrøm)	2020	non-album single
"Blessed"	2021	TBA
"I'll Be Around"	2022	TBA

== Scholastic chess career ==
Diaz began playing chess at six-years old. She was coached by Sophia Rohde and John MacArthur. Her stillness and silence were determined as traits of a good chess player by her coaches, despite Diaz not excelling at the game for her first three years.

When she was in fourth grade, she placed first in New York City's chess competition, second in New York's competition, and won SuperNationals. She often used the Sicilian Defence in her matches and was given the nickname, ‘The Tank’.

Often being the youngest player, and a girl, Diaz regularly experienced sexism and condescension at chess tournaments. She's stated that alcoholism is common among young chess players.

In 2017, she competed with Oberlin College at the Pan-American Intercollegiate Chess Championship in New Orleans, where the team won the best small college division for the fourth consecutive year.

In 2020, she was a guest on United States Chess Federation's podcast, Ladies Knight, hosted by Jennifer Shahade. In 2023, Diaz performed music at the World Chess Hall of Fame.
