= Citarella =

Citarella is a surname. Notable people with the surname include:

- Joshua Citarella (born 1987), American artist, researcher and Twitch streamer
- Laura Citarella (born 1981), Argentine film director and producer
- Ralph Citarella (born 1958), Major League Baseball pitcher

Citarella refers to the following businesses:

- Citarella Gourmet Market
