= The Shops & Restaurants at Hudson Yards =

Shopping mall in New York City

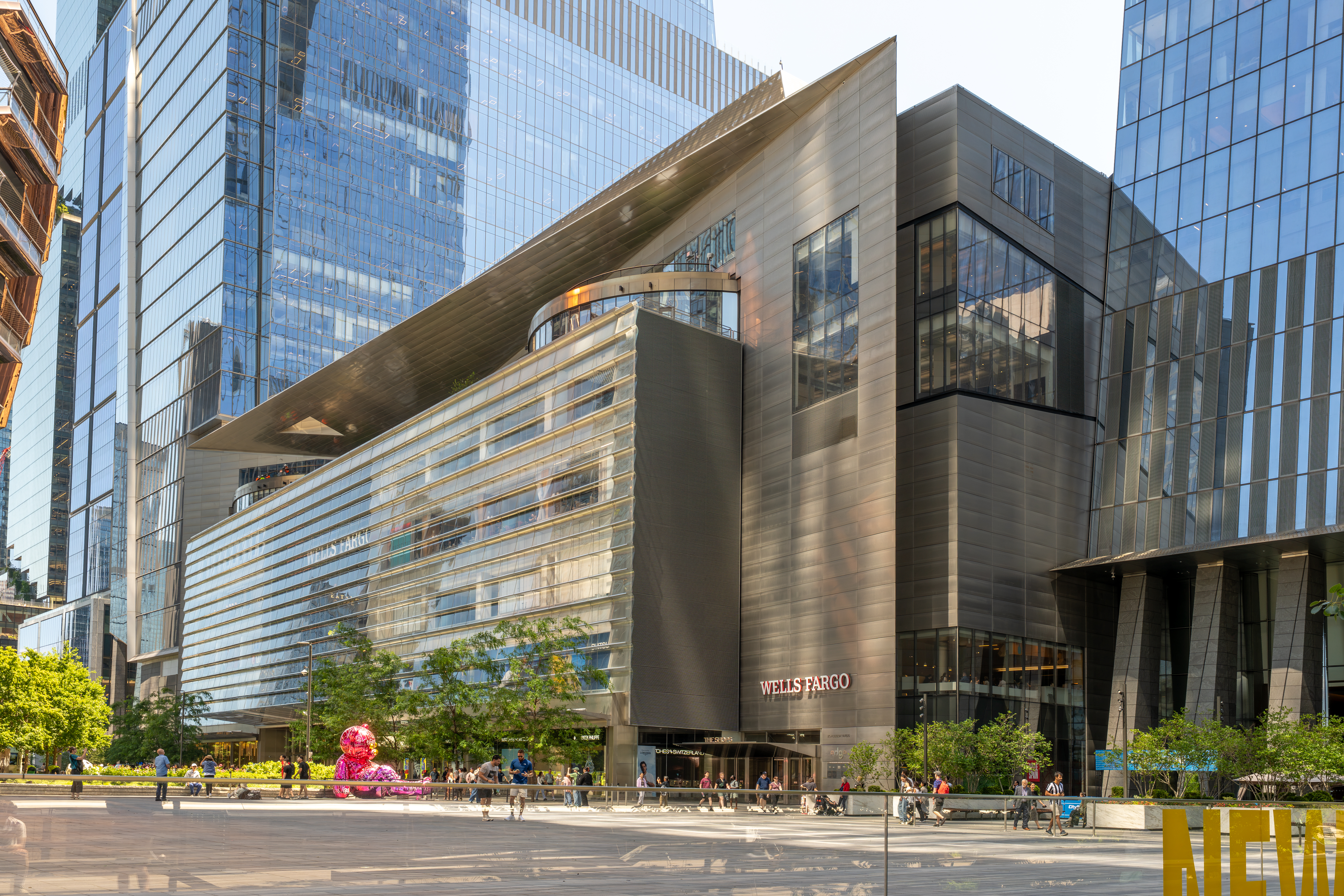
- As seen from the Hudson Yards Plaza (June 2026)
- Location: New York City, NY, U.S.
- Address: 20 Hudson Yards
- Opened: March 15, 2019; 7 years ago
- Developer: Related Companies; Oxford Properties
- Manager: Related Companies
- Owner: Related Companies
- Architect: Kohn Pedersen Fox
- Num. of stores: 100
- Num. of anchor tenants: 3 (1 open, 2 vacant)
- Floor area: 1,000,000 square feet (93,000 m^{2})
- Floors: 7
- Parking: 545 West 30th Street
- Public transit: New York City Subway: at 34th Street-Hudson Yards
- Website: hudsonyardsnewyork.com/shop

Map of buildings and structures at Hudson Yards. Zoom the map and click on points for more details.

The Shops & Restaurants at Hudson Yards is an upscale indoor shopping mall in New York City, located at 20 Hudson Yards, at 33rd Street and Tenth Avenue, within the Hudson Yards complex in Midtown Manhattan. It was built with 1 million square feet (93,000 m^{2}) of space, including 750,000 square feet (70,000 m^{2}) in retail, including department stores, containing one of the Manhattan’s newest neighborhood with very diverse shops, attractions, and restaurants. Of this, 445,000 square feet (41,300 m^{2}) was converted to office space in 2023.

== History ==
In September 2014, Neiman Marcus signed to become the anchor tenant of the Hudson Yards retail space. The retail space, designed by Kohn Pedersen Fox and Elkus Manfredi Architects with a connection to the bases of 10 and 30 Hudson Yards, started construction in June 2015, with a 100,000 short tons (91,000,000 kg) order of steel, one of the largest such orders in the history of the United States. The mall opened on March 15, 2019. Neiman Marcus occupied the top three levels and one-fourth of the mall, or 250,000 square feet (23,000 m^{2}). Chef and restaurateur Thomas Keller opened his second restaurant in New York City, called TAK Room, in addition to selecting 11 other fine dining restaurants on the fifth through seventh floors. The mall was anchored by Dior and Chanel, with a Fifth Avenue mix of shops such as H&M, Zara, and Sephora below them.

Due to the COVID-19 pandemic, many of the stores closed permanently, including Neiman Marcus, the Citarella Gourmet Market, Banana Republic, and Sephora. The mall also lost restaurants such as the TAK Room, Kawi, and Belcampo Meat Co. After the pandemic, the Shops at Hudson Yards sought to add new stores and eateries Louis Vuitton returned to the mall with a freestanding store from a previously operated shop inside Neiman Marcus. Levi's, Bulgari, Magnolia Bakery, and Pret A Manger are among the retail and restaurant establishments that were opening at the mall in the early 2020s.

Related Companies placed 380,000 square feet (35,000 m^{2}) of the mall for sale in 2020, intending to find an office tenant. Wells Fargo bought 445,000 sq ft (41,300 m^{2}) across three stories of the mall for $550 million in September 2023. Wells Fargo's space is connected to approximately 905,000 sq ft (84,100 m^{2}) that the company already owned at 30 Hudson Yards, and the space was expected to accommodate nearly 2,300 employees. The renovation included replacing the mall's facade along Tenth Avenue.

== Gallery ==
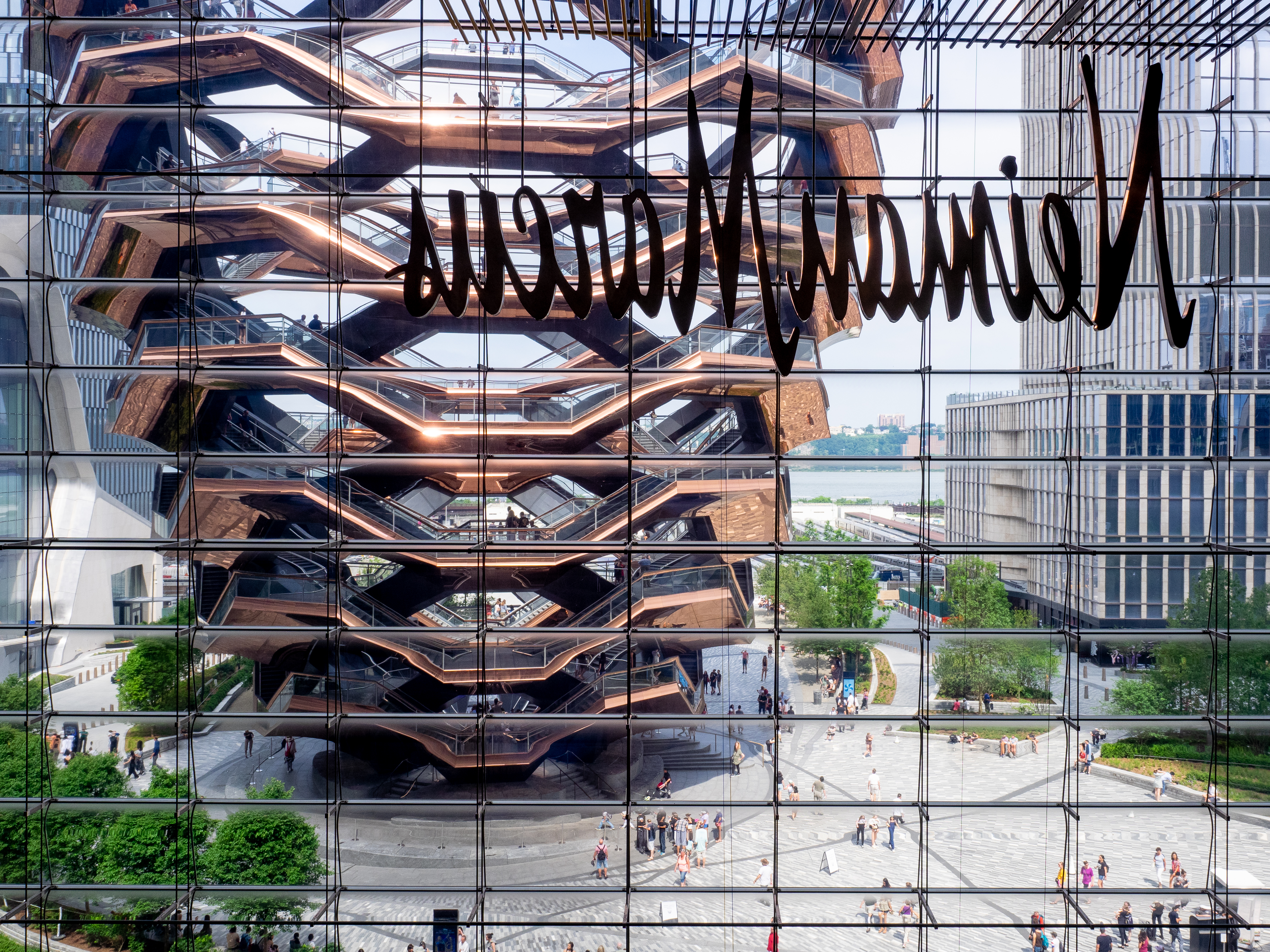
The Vessel which can be seen through an atrium in the mall from the 5th floor

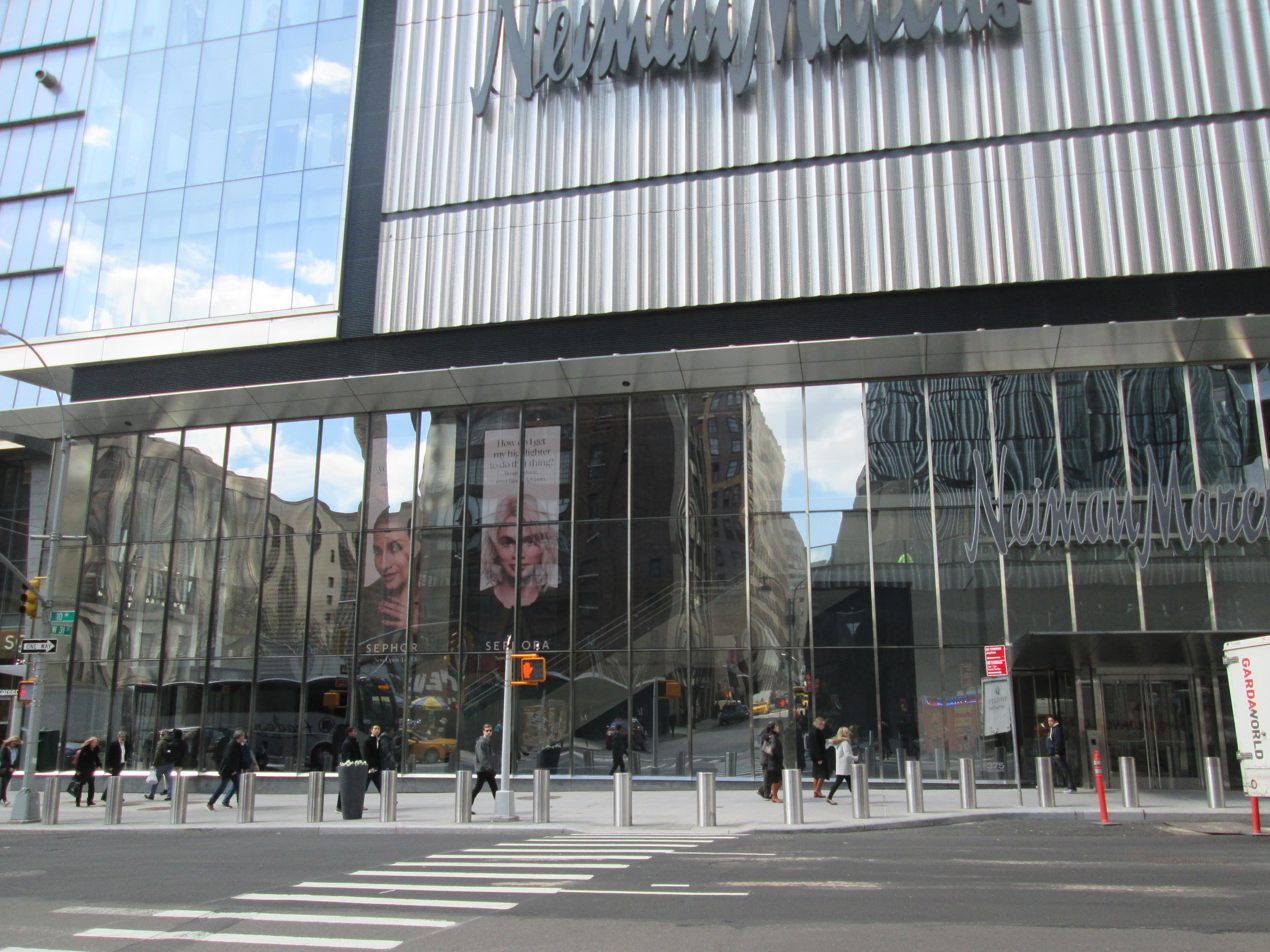
10th Avenue mall entrance, seen in March 2019

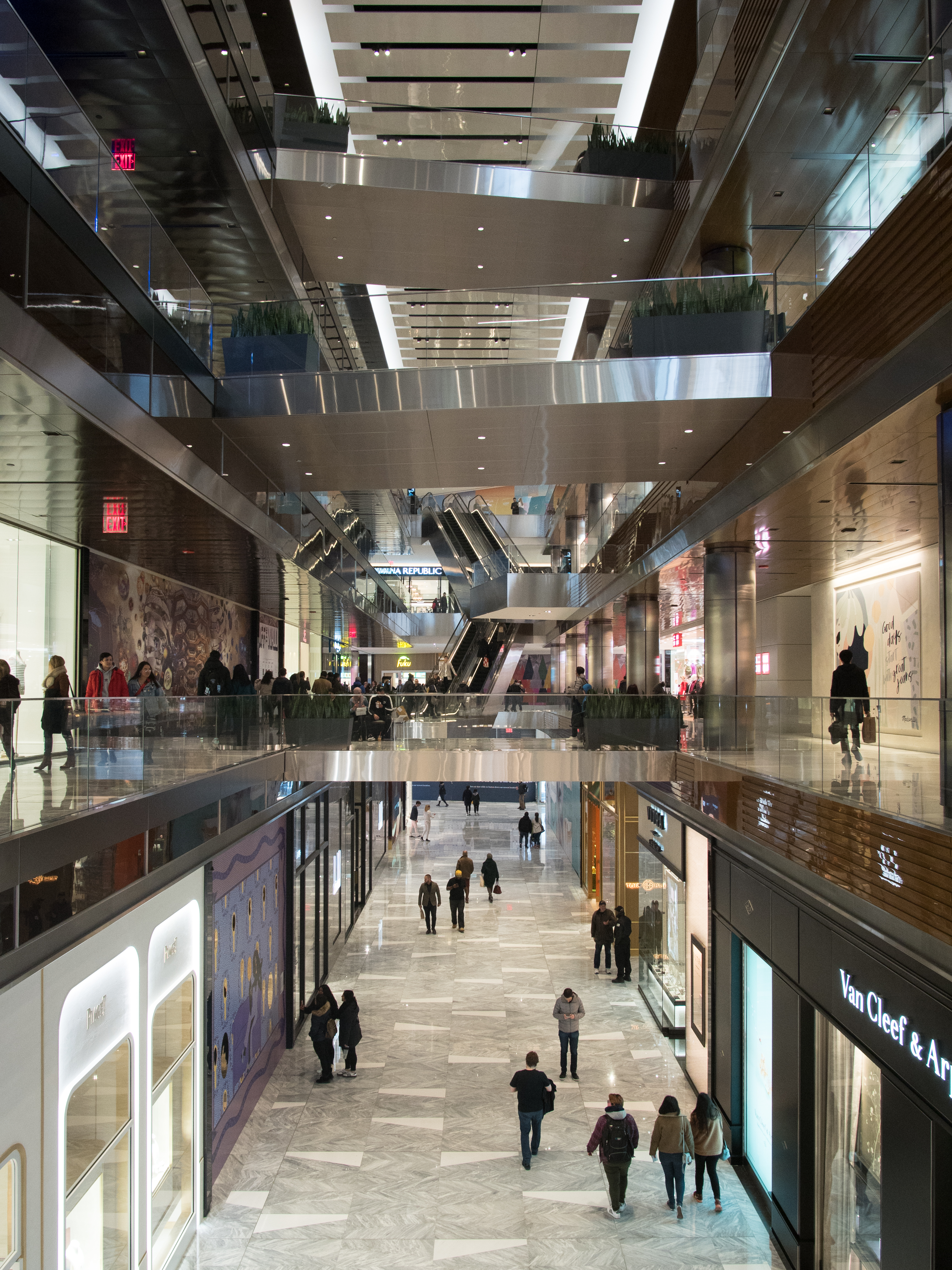
Interior of the mall, seen in March 2019

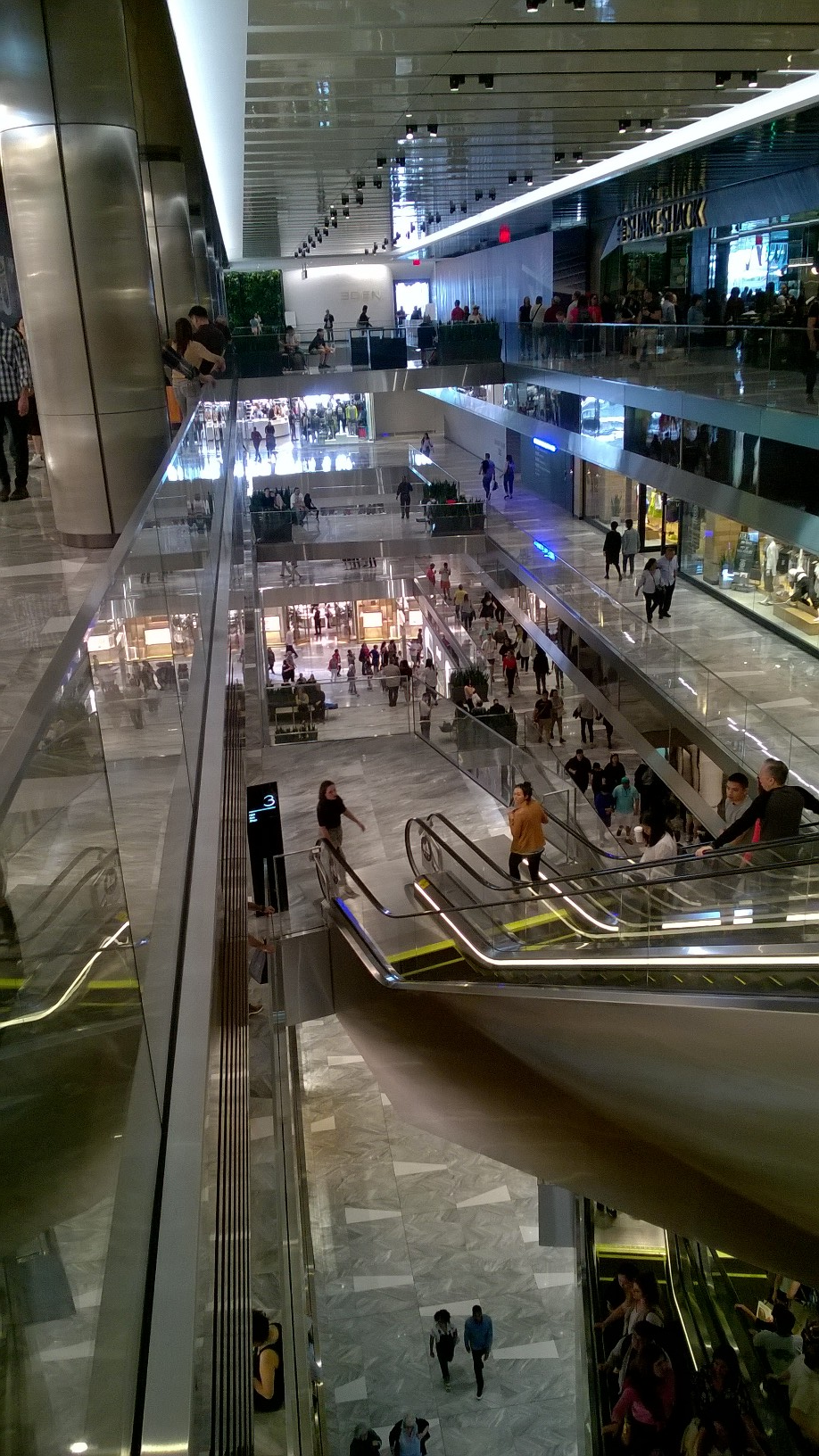
Interior of the mall, seen in May 2019
