= 34th Street–Hudson Yards station =

New York City Subway station in Manhattan

34 Street–Hudson Yards
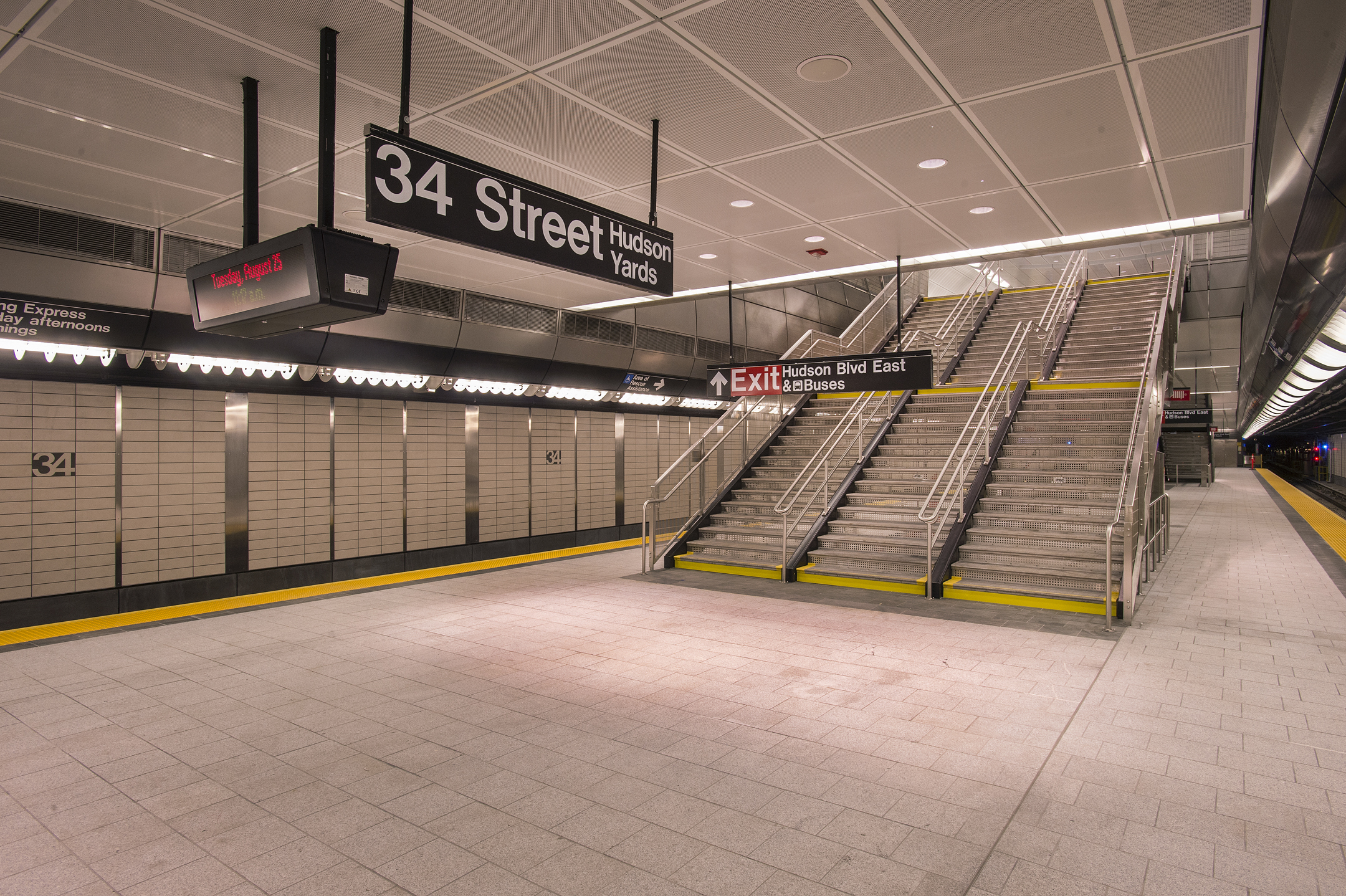

Station statistics
- Address: 34th Street & 11th Avenue (actual exits at Hudson Boulevard); New York, New York
- Borough: Manhattan
- Locale: Hell's Kitchen, Hudson Yards, and Chelsea
- Coordinates: 40°45′21.02″N 74°0′7.06″W
- Division: A (IRT)
- Line: IRT Flushing Line
- Services: 7 (all times) <7> (rush hours until 9:30 p.m., peak direction)
- Transit: NYCT Bus: M12, M34 SBS; FlixBus (located on 34th Street between 11th and 12th Aves); OurBus (located on 11th Ave between 36th and 37th Streets)
- Structure: Underground
- Depth: 125 feet (38 m)
- Platforms: 1 island platform
- Tracks: 2

Other information
- Opened: September 13, 2015; 11 years ago
- Accessible: Yes
- Other entrances/ exits: 34th Street and Hudson Boulevard; 35th Street and Hudson Boulevard

Traffic
- 2025: 6,674,673 ▲10.8%
- Rank: 34 out of 423
Services
Preceding station	New York City Subway	Following station
Terminus	7 (New York City Subway service)	Times Square–42nd Street 7 <7> toward Flushing–Main Street
Location
Location within New York City Subway
Location within New York City
Location within New York
Street map
Station service legend
Symbol	Description
Stops all times	Stops all times
Stops rush hours in the peak direction only	Stops rush hours in the peak direction only

The 34th Street–Hudson Yards station is a New York City Subway station in Manhattan's West Side on the IRT Flushing Line, and is the western (railroad south) terminus for the 7 local and <7> express services. It has two tracks and one island platform, with two levels of mezzanines: one directly above the platform and the other directly below street level. The station directly serves the Hudson Yards mega-development above it, and is located within the greater Hudson Yards neighborhood. The station contains two entrances along Hudson Boulevard: a primary entrance south of 34th Street, and secondary entrance south of 35th Street.

The station, originally part of the city's bid for the 2012 Summer Olympics and the failed attempt to build the West Side Stadium, was first scheduled to open in summer 2012. When London was chosen for the Olympics, the opening date was pushed to December 2013. In 2011, the opening was postponed to June 2014, pending the completion of the escalators and elevators in the station. After a series of delays involving escalator, elevator, and fire and safety systems, the station finally opened on September 13, 2015. The 34th Street station was, at the time of opening, the first completely new station in the New York City Subway system since 1989, (Note: The last unique stations—Lexington Avenue–63rd Street, Roosevelt Island, and 21st Street–Queensbridge, opened on October 27, 1989. The new South Ferry station platform opened on March 16, 2009, but replaces a pre-existing station and also connects to the Whitehall Street station.) as well as the first such station funded by the government of New York City since 1950.

The new construction, part of the city's and the MTA's master plan for the Far West Side, extended the IRT Flushing Line west from Times Square to Eleventh Avenue, then south to 34th Street. Although the West Side Stadium plan was rejected by city and state planning agencies, the 7 Subway Extension plan received approval to move ahead, as New York political leaders wanted to see the warehouse district west of Eighth Avenue and north of 34th Street redeveloped as part of the Hudson Yards Redevelopment, and subway service was to be an essential part of that effort. The extension also serves the Jacob K. Javits Convention Center, which was expanded in 2008–2014 and is located a block away from the station entrances.

== History ==
=== Planning and construction ===
Shortly after Javits Center opened as New York City's primary convention center in 1986, New York City transportation commissioner Ross Sandler had suggested the possibility of extending the IRT Flushing Line (then served by the 7 train) or constructing a light-rail line to the convention center. At the time, the neighborhood was largely inaccessible by public transit, and the nearest subway station was about 0.5 miles (0.80 km) away. In response to the City Planning Commission's 1993 proposal to improve access to the Manhattan Central Business District, the Metropolitan Transportation Authority (MTA) began exploring the possibility of an extension of the IRT Flushing Line to New Jersey. In 1999, then-mayor Rudolph Giuliani advocated for a westward extension of the 7 train to the intersection of 11th Avenue and 33rd Street, where he wanted to build a football stadium, the West Side Stadium. The same year, the MTA included $75 million in its 2000–2004 capital plan for preliminary studies of the 7 train extension.

In 2001, a business and civic group convened by Senator Charles Schumer argued that a westward extension of the Midtown office district could not be accomplished without a subway extension, saying:

The long blocks along the avenues make the walk as long as 20 minutes to the westernmost parts of the area. In addition, there is no convenient link from Grand Central Station or elsewhere on the east side of Manhattan, making the Far West Side a difficult commute for workers from parts of Manhattan, Queens, Westchester and Connecticut.

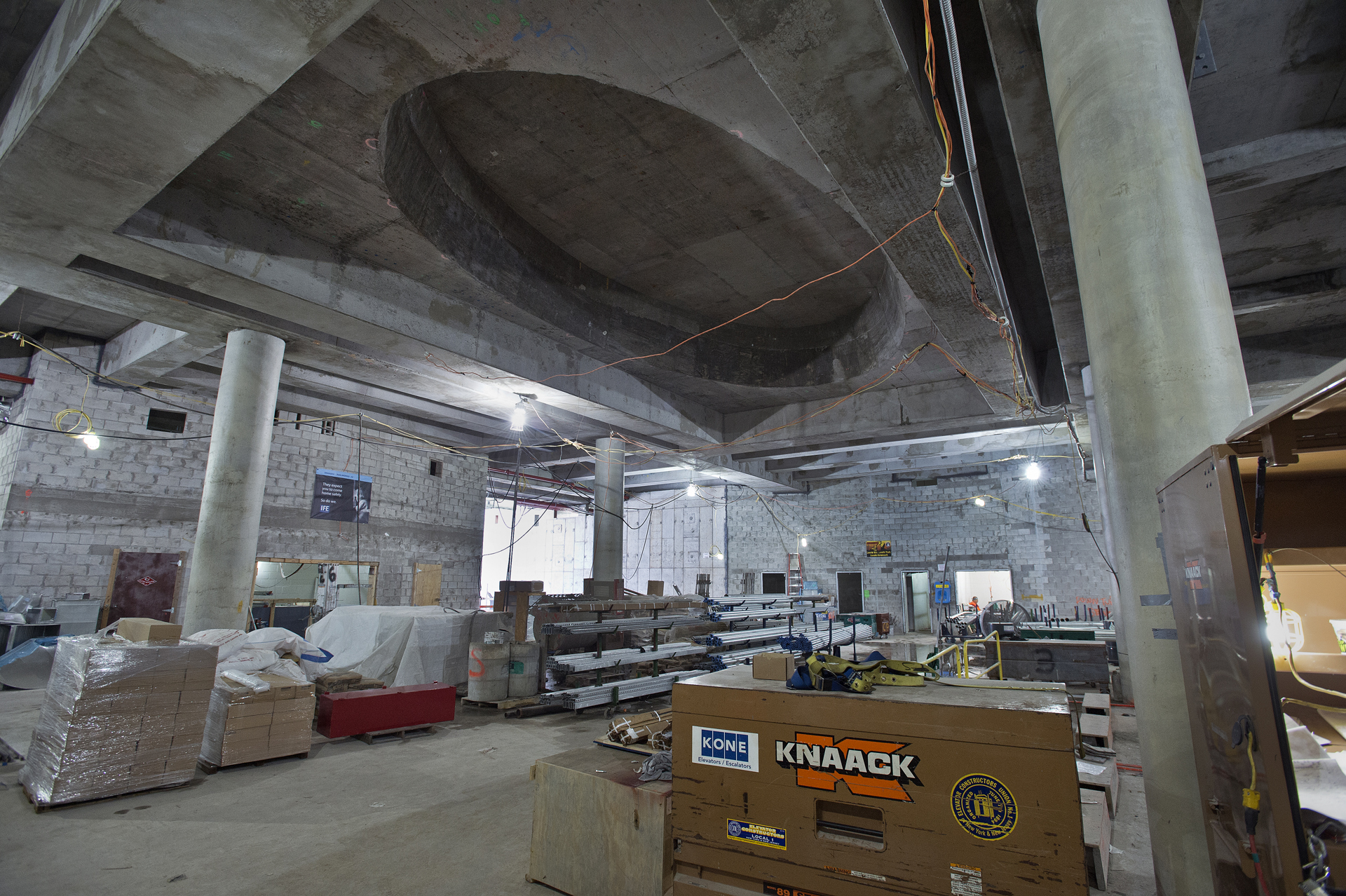
Part of the upper mezzanine under construction

A station on the West Side was again proposed as part of the New York City bid for the 2012 Summer Olympics. The city government wanted to get funding before July 2005, at which time the International Olympic Committee would vote on funding. However, due to shortfalls in the MTA's capital program, as well as preexisting funding for the Second Avenue Subway and East Side Access, the MTA could not pay to fund the extension. After a proposal for the West Side Stadium, an Olympic stadium to be located above the nearby West Side Yard, was rejected in 2005, New York City lost their Olympic bid to London.

For then-Mayor Michael Bloomberg, the extension was still a priority. His December 12, 2006, address to the New York League of Conservation Voters noted that in November 2006, the government began issuing bonds to fund the extension of the 7 subway to Eleventh Avenue and 34th Street. The extension was funded with New York City funds from municipal tax increment financing (TIF) bond sales that are expected to be repaid with property tax revenues from future developments in areas served by the extension. The one-station extension to the burgeoning Hudson Yards area was originally to cost US$2.1 billion, but eventually grew to US$2.4 billion, excluding a US$500 million intermediate station at 10th Avenue that was canceled due to costs.

In October 2007, the MTA awarded a $1.145 billion contract to build 7,000 feet (2,100 m) of twin-tube tunnel to S3, a joint venture of J.F. Shea, Skanska USA Civil, and Schiavone. The contract was to build tunnel from the 7 train's terminus at Times Square westward underneath 41st Street to Eleventh Avenue, then down to 26th Street. Richard Dattner and Partners, Architects, designed the 34th Street station. After excavating the new terminal's shell and creating the first 1,000 feet (300 m) of tunnel using the drill-and-blast method, S3 placed two tunnel-boring machines (TBMs) in the ground to dig the remaining 6,000 feet (1,800 m); as it dug, each TBM placed precast concrete liner segments to create the tunnel interior.

On December 21, 2009, the MTA said that a tunnel-boring machine broke through the 34th Street station cavern wall. Both tunnel-boring machines were scheduled to finish the required tunneling in the spring of 2010.

In April 2011, the MTA announced that the contract covering the tunnels, the station mezzanine and passenger platform was 85% complete, and that the systems contract, covering mechanical and electrical systems, electric power, lighting and train tracks would be awarded by July 2011. The systems contract was awarded in September 2011. In May 2012, the MTA announced that the extension, now 65% complete, had received the installation of the first set of rails. By August 2013, the extension was 90% complete.

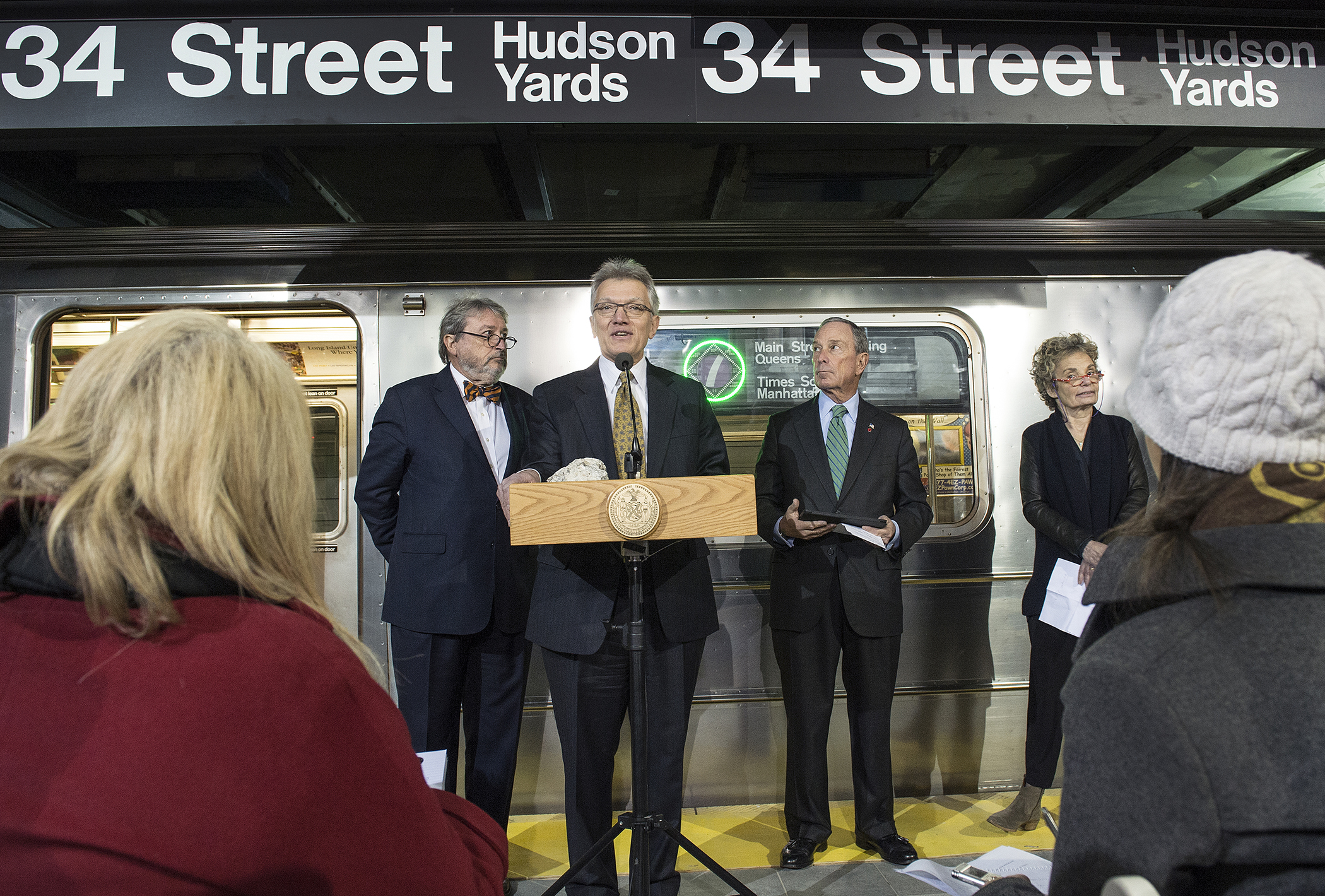
Then-mayor Michael Bloomberg stands to the right of the speaker at a ceremony at the station in December 2013.

On December 20, 2013, Bloomberg took a ceremonial ride on a train to the nearly complete station, celebrating a part of his legacy as mayor, during a press tour of the extension. Train testing did not commence until June 2015.

=== Delays ===
In January 2012, the station was touted as under-budget and on schedule to open in 2013, before a series of delays plagued the project. The station, originally part of the city's bid for the 2012 Summer Olympics, was supposed to first open as part of a two-station subway extension, including 10th Avenue station, in summer 2012. When London was chosen for the Olympics in 2005, the opening date was pushed to December 2013; the Tenth Avenue station was dropped from construction plans soon after. By June 2012, trains were still expected to run "for test purposes" by the end of 2013. That same month, the station's opening was delayed to June 2014 for completion of the station's fitting-out.

Michael Horodniceanu, chief of MTA Construction Company, told The New York Times in January 2014 that complications in the installation of the inclined elevator would likely cause a further delay of about three months, bringing the opening date to very late summer or early fall of 2014, or to November 2014. (Note: The exact opening date at this time was unclear. The tentative opening date was given by alternate sources as either November 2014, fall or winter 2014, fall 2014, or simply "2014".) By March 2014, the station's tentative opening date was still to be in November 2014.

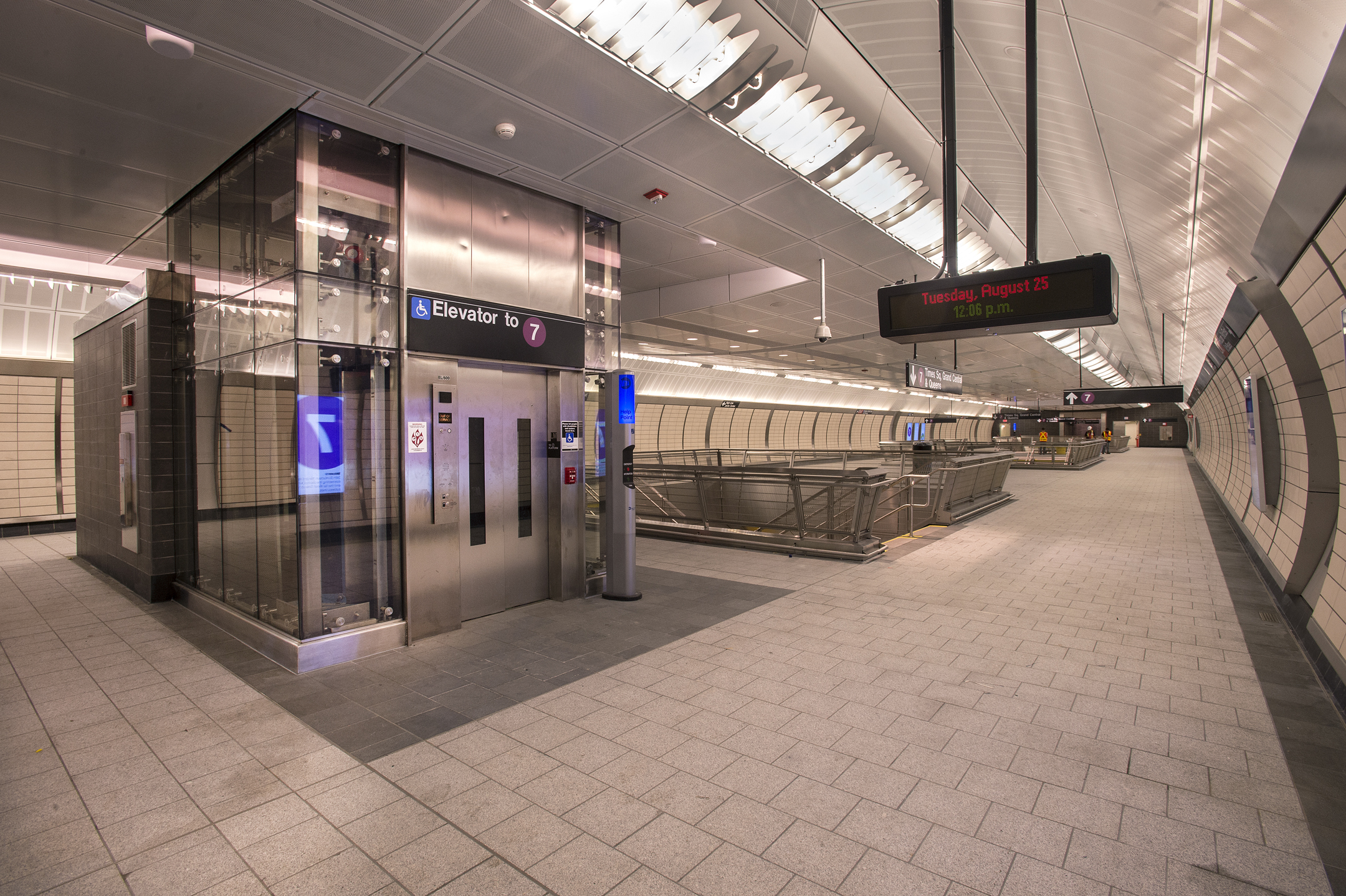
Lower mezzanine level

Then, in May 2014, the opening was delayed again to install the inclined elevators, as they had originally failed a factory test in Como Province, Italy. Officials had insisted that the Italian-manufactured elevators had software and parts made from a variety of different companies in America, rather than from a single foreign company. However, the station was not delayed solely because of the elevators. The station's opening was also pushed to later dates due to "integrated testing for fire protection", which required the completion of all station infrastructure, including escalators, stairs, and elevators. Escalators and tunnel ventilation systems also caused the station to be delayed. At this point, the station was expected to open for service in late 2014, but due to further elevator delays as well as problems with the extension's ventilation systems, it was delayed in October 2014 by a further few months, to February 2015.

At this point, the project was so far delayed that the MTA was offered US$4.75 million in "incentive" money if the station opened by February 24, 2015. Software changes were made to solve the elevators' problems, and the elevators were installed. Testing would be complete by November. Three ventilation systems were already installed by October 1, 2014, with two more systems to be installed by the end of the month. On November 17, it was confirmed that February 24 would be the opening date for the station; new signs and the southern entrance's canopy started to be erected. However, just a month later, the MTA stated that it was unable to open the subway extension for service until April to July 2015, due to the failure to get the inclined elevators to work properly. The MTA also cited problems with the fire alarm and security systems as another reason for the delay. In addition, the developer of the Hudson Yards mega-development, The Related Companies, also needed to dig caissons for the foundations of 55 Hudson Yards, just above the subway station, and the foundation work needed to be complete before the MTA could proceed with opening the station.

The MTA made another announcement, on March 24, 2015, saying that the station's opening would be delayed again to summer 2015, due to more problems with the fire and security systems. In addition, third rails, public service announcement systems, ventilation fans, escalators, and elevators would need to be tested. By April 2015, the station was complete, but unopened. On June 15, 2015, though, the extension was pushed back again to "before the end of the third quarter" of 2015. A month later, the MTA confirmed that the station would be opened on or before September 13, 2015. The opening date was confirmed on August 28, 2015. By this point, MTA chairman Thomas Prendergast had stated that the myriad delays in both the new station and in the other MTA Capital Construction projects were humiliating.

=== Operation ===
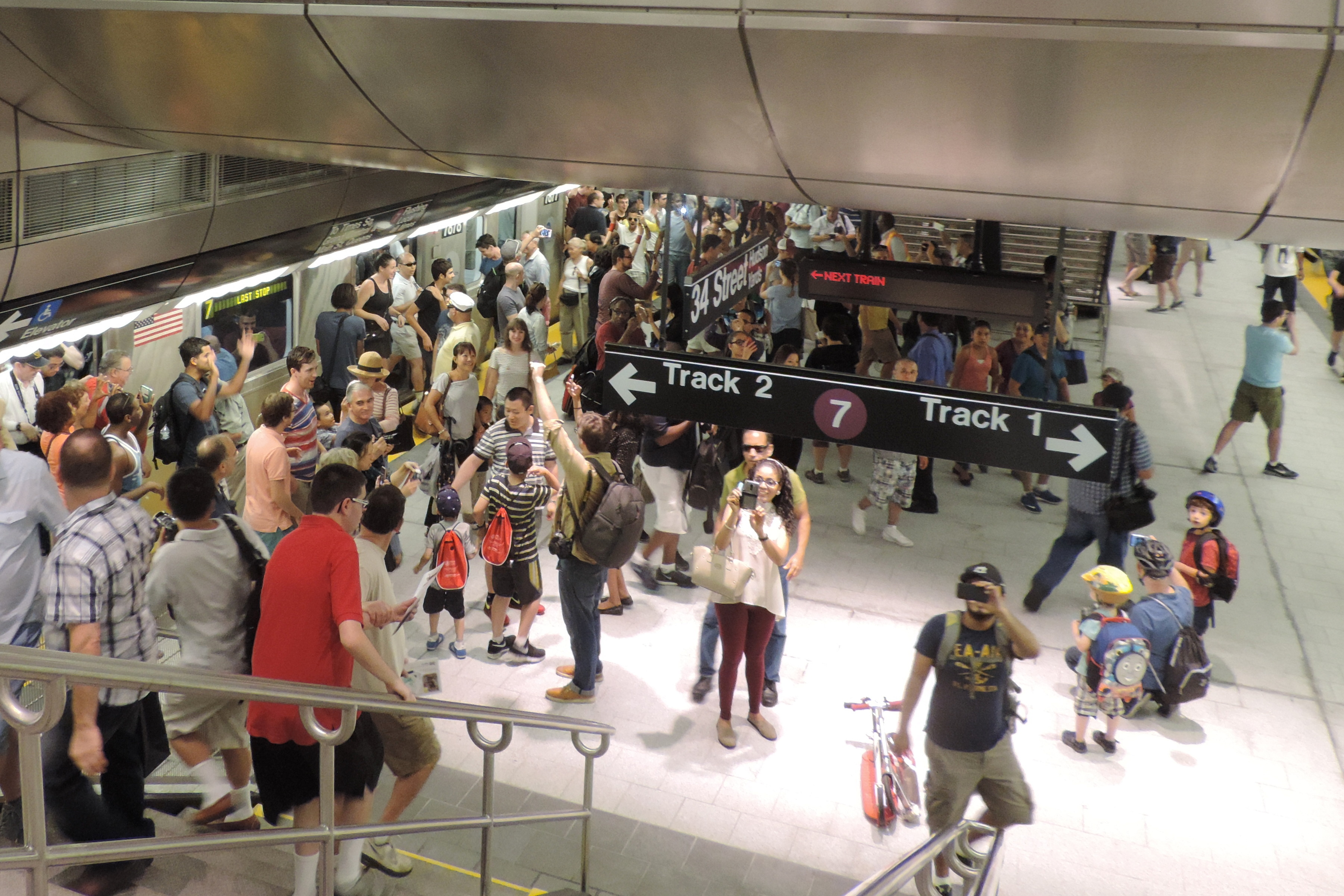
Station platform on opening day

The station opened on September 13, 2015, at 1:00 p.m., in a ribbon-cutting ceremony attended by New York City mayor Bill de Blasio, U.S. Senator Chuck Schumer, and former deputy mayor Dan Doctoroff. The secondary station entrance at 35th Street, as well as finishing touches within the station itself, was not expected to be completed until 2016.

However, a couple of days after the station opened, there were some problems in and around the station, which multiple news outlets criticized. An escalator broke down on September 14, just a day after the station's opening. In an unrelated September 16 incident, a straphanger got injured while walking up another escalator at the 34th Street station. Earlier that day, the New York Post reported on signal problems in the brand-new tunnels around the station, while riders complained about the delays on Twitter and Reddit. A The Wall Street Journal commentator remarked that "it's only a matter of months (make that weeks) before the gleaming station ... is pockmarked with chewing-gum spots, urban scrawl and litter." Overall, however, the station was received positively during its first few days of service. In an article in several newspapers distributed by NYC Community Media, Lenore Skenazy writes that many riders have praised the station's design, its cleanliness, and its climate-controlled platforms, and noted herself that the station looked and felt "as uplifting as a cathedral".

In March 2016, news sources reported that despite the station's high cost, the station had maintenance problems: there were leaks in the ceiling of the corridors holding the escalators, the station's bathrooms were closed because of flooding from the street, and icicles had formed on the ceiling of the station. The MTA supposedly knew about the issues for several years, even during construction. The MTA board called these issues "unacceptable" and the contractor responsible for waterproofing the station spent $3 million to fix them. The leaky ceiling was reportedly fixed by May 2016. At least one passenger filed a lawsuit against the MTA because of injuries sustained after falling down an escalator to avoid the leaky ceiling.

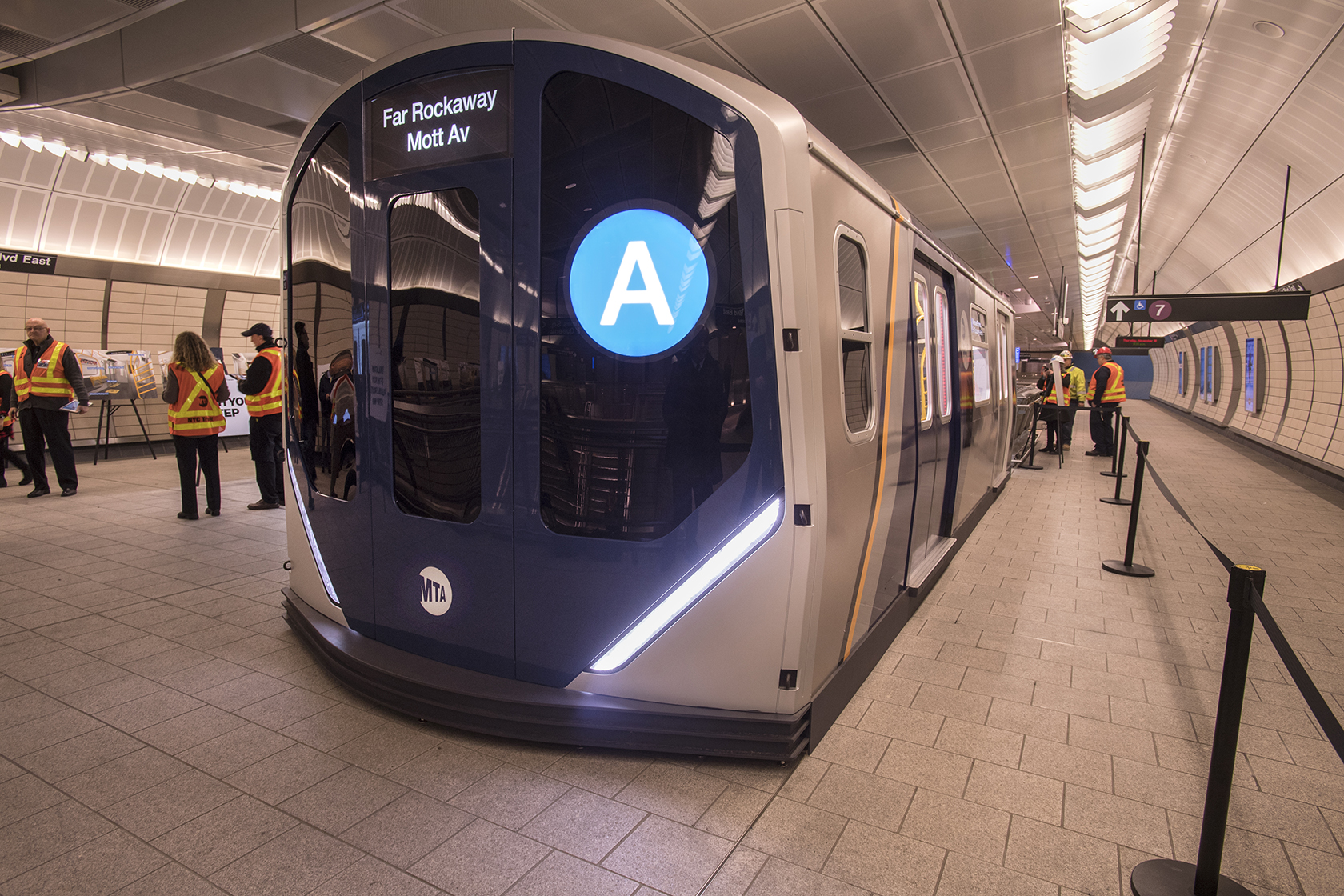
The R211 mockup

In 2017, part of the mezzanine was closed off so the MTA could build a mockup of the proposed R211 subway car. The model was open to the public from November 30 to December 6, 2017. The mockup contained features such as an open-gangway design proposed for this order; digital screens showing next stops and their station layouts; and a blue-and-gold-stripe paint design on its exterior.

A secondary station entrance at the southwest corner of 35th Street and Hudson Boulevard opened on September 1, 2018, nearly three years after the station's opening. The secondary entrance provides access to the north end of the station. In March 2019, the MTA reported that the 34th Street–Hudson Yards station contained three of the ten least reliable subway escalators in Manhattan. Each of the escalators was out of service more than one-sixth of the time. One of these escalators, at the 35th Street entrance, was closed 25 times from October to December 2018. Hudson Yards itself did not open until March 2019.

== Station layout ==
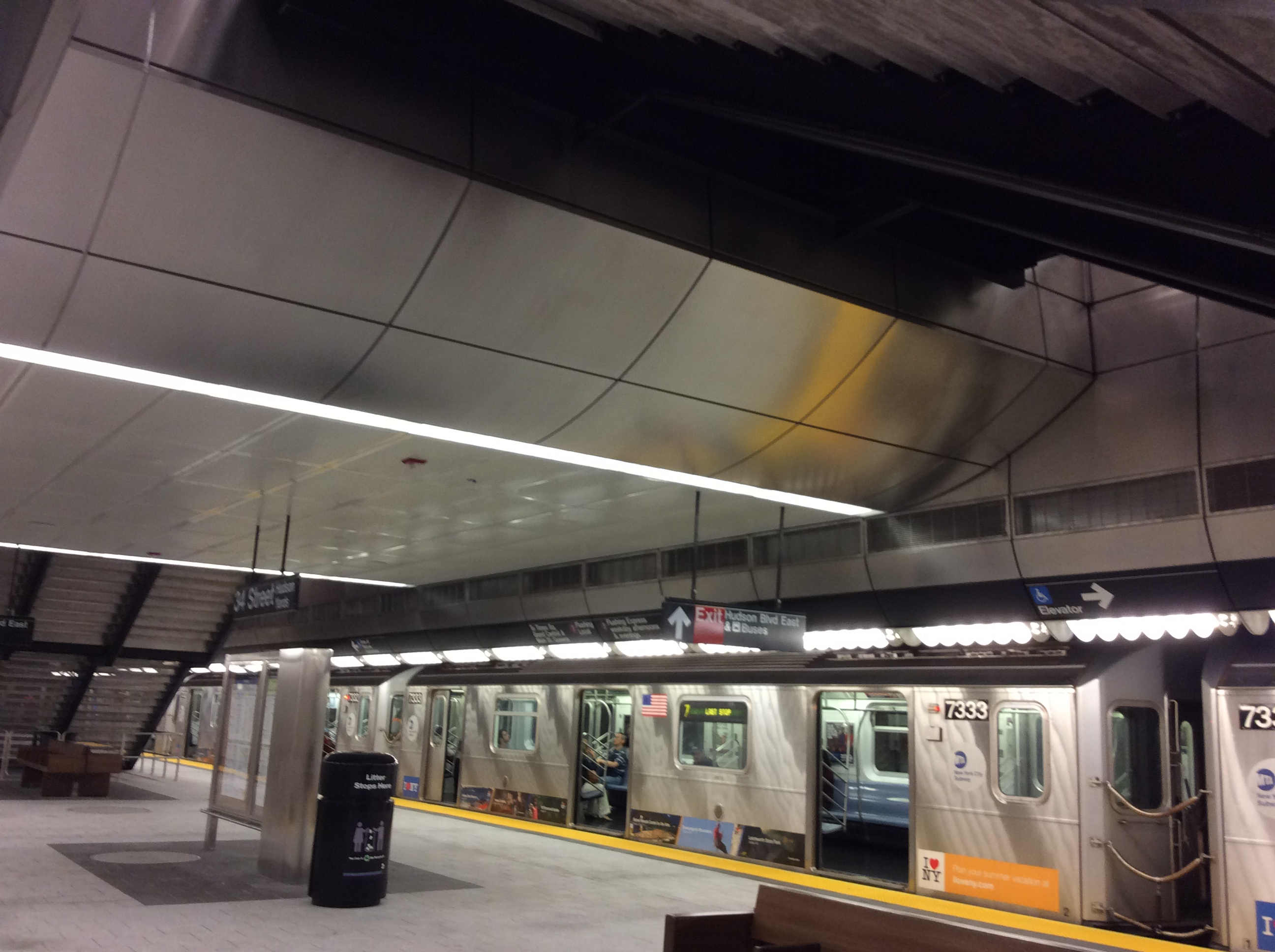
7 train at platform level

The approximately 1,200-foot-long (370 m) station, designed by Dattner Architects, has a single wide island platform serving two tracks, as well as eight staircases between the lower mezzanine and the platform. The platform is 35 feet (11 m) wide, which makes it much wider than many other island platforms in the subway system; by comparison, the Chambers Street station on the Seventh Avenue Line in Lower Manhattan has platforms that are 18.5 feet (5.6 m) wide, and the Second Avenue Subway stations are 27.8 feet (8.5 m) wide. The platform, at 585 feet (178 m) long, is among the longest in the IRT system, as well as the longest "column-free" platform of any station in the system. The 7 train stops here at all times, and the <7> train stops here during rush hours, when it operates in the peak direction. The station is the western terminus of the 7 train; the next stop to the east is Times Square.

The station, which is paid for with tax increment financing property taxes, is the first to be funded by the city since the Jamaica–179th Street station on the IND Queens Boulevard Line opened in 1950, as well as the first new unique station in the New York City Subway since the three stations on the IND 63rd Street Line opened in October 1989. The Hudson Park and Boulevard project was also included with the construction of the station, since the park and station were built concurrently with both station entrances located inside the park.

=== Design ===
The walls adjacent to the tracks have white tiles arranged in sets of three 15-foot (4.6 m) columns of 3 tiles each. There are two-tile-high gray squares containing white "34"s in the middle of each set of columns. They are pre-fabricated porcelain panels, in three-by-five slabs, to allow easy replacement. On the lower mezzanine, the architects used high ceilings and convex railings to make the station seem bigger, thus improving passenger flow. A tiling pattern, similar to that used on platform level, is also used on the lower mezzanine, though electronic advertisement panels are mounted on the walls at certain areas along the lower mezzanine. The cavernous station's design has been compared to that of Washington Metro stations, although early plans for narrow, Washington Metro-like platforms were scrapped. The station has also been compared to stations along London's Jubilee Line Extension; its architecture was inspired by that of the Canary Wharf tube station on that extension.

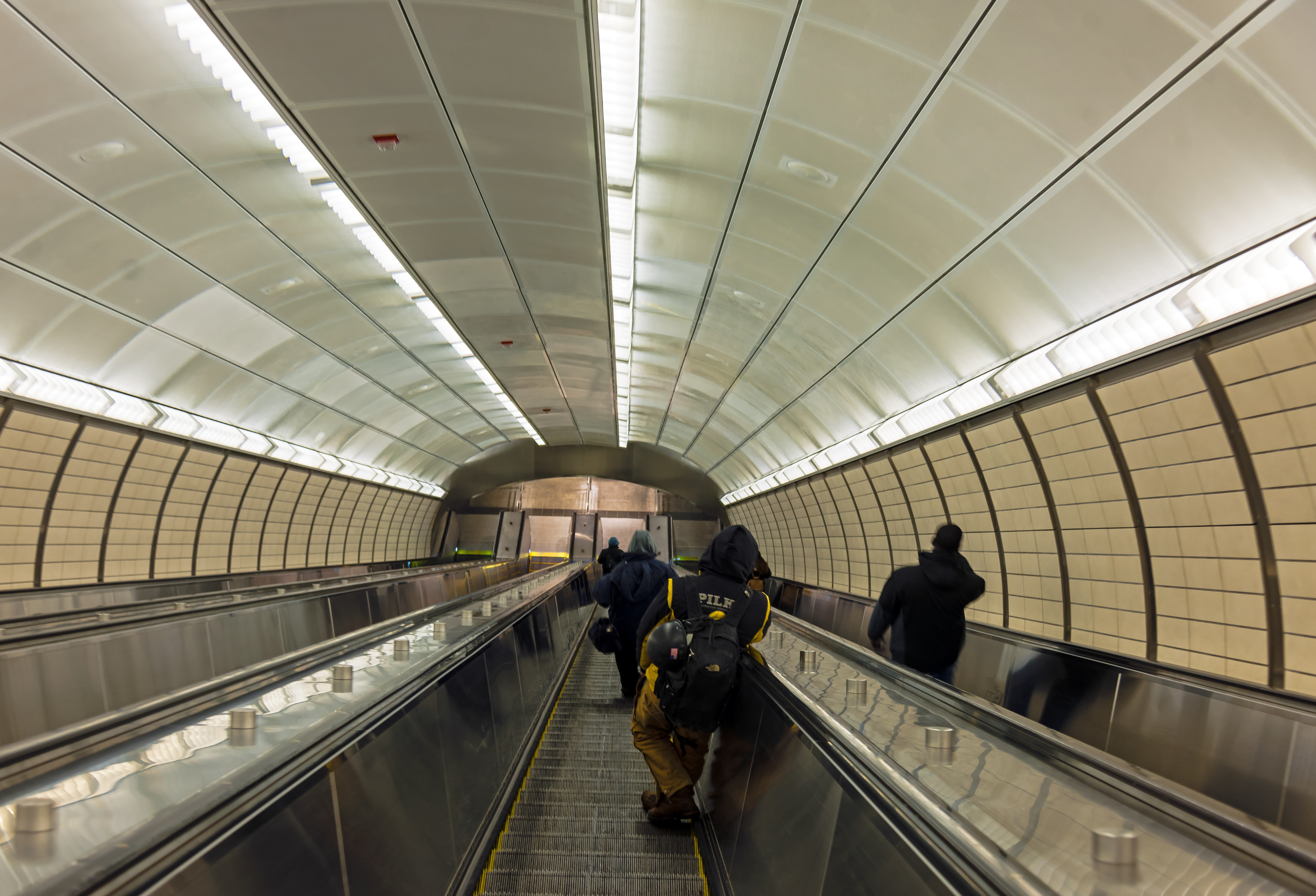
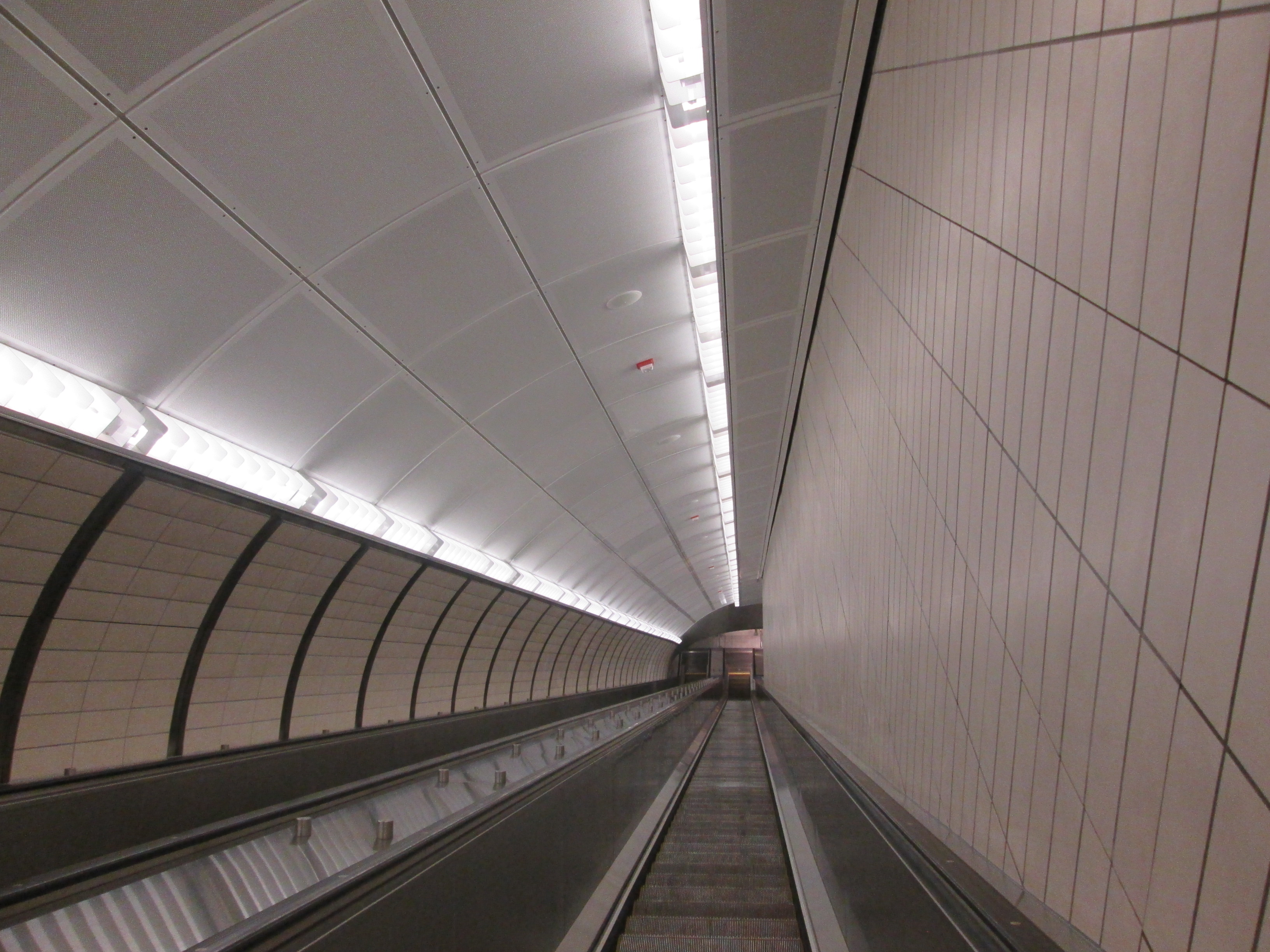
The long lower escalators leading from the 34th Street entrance (top) and the 35th Street entrance (bottom)

The station's extreme depth necessitates an upper (fare) mezzanine and a lower (passenger) mezzanine at both entrances. The main entrance, at 34th Street, contains 27.6-foot-deep (8.4 m) fare mezzanine located under the basement of 55 Hudson Yards. Escalators and an incline elevator lead to the lower mezzanine, which is 109 feet (33 m) deep. An additional upper mezzanine at 35th Street is located at the same depth, but is not connected to the 34th Street mezzanine. Both upper mezzanines lead to a full-length passenger mezzanine above the platform. Above the lower mezzanine is a curved, oval-shaped ceiling indentation that helps to cover the ventilation tubes in the station ceiling, and also acts as a skylight. The curved, cavernous ceiling of the lower mezzanine helps the station be energy-efficient via the use of indirect lighting. The Empire Connection and North River Tunnels are both located above the station's lower mezzanine. (Note: The depth is so that there is minimal disruption to the structures above the station, such as the Lincoln Tunnel.)

The station contains a total of 16 escalators: nine between the upper and lower mezzanine levels, and seven between the street and upper mezzanine levels. Nine of these escalators are only reachable from the main entrance at 34th Street, while seven are only reachable from the secondary entrance at 35th Street. At the main entrance, four escalators and two stairs lead from street level to that entrance's upper mezzanine. Past the main entrance's fare control, which is split into two banks, there are two parallel shafts down to the lower mezzanine. The northern shaft carries four escalators, while the southern shaft carries one up-only escalator and the two incline elevators. The secondary entrance contains an additional three escalators and a stair between the street and that entrance's upper mezzanine. Past the turnstiles, a single bank of four escalators leads to the lower mezzanine. While the main entrance's escalator shaft to the lower mezzanine is column-free, the secondary entrance's corresponding escalator shaft contains supporting columns in the center, between the inner two escalators. The lowermost escalators between the mezzanines are the system's longest and take about one minute and thirty seconds to traverse.

The station also contains four elevators, all of which are only accessible via the main entrance. Two elevators travel vertically: one from street level to the upper mezzanine, and one from the lower mezzanine to platform level. The other two are incline elevators (see § Incline elevators), traveling diagonally in the shaft between the main entrance's upper mezzanine and the lower mezzanine.

33rd St to 34th St subway cross-section
11th Av	10th & 9th Avs are skipped	Farley Building & Moynihan Train Hall	8th Av	Madison Square; Garden	7th Av	Storefronts	6th Av & Broadway		5th & Madison Avs are skipped	Park Av
mezzanine	10th & 9th Avs are skipped	train hall	A/C/E	concourse	1/2/3	Former Gimbel's passageway	mezz	PATH	5th & Madison Avs are skipped	6/<6>
mezzanine	10th & 9th Avs are skipped	conc	mezzanine	concourse	mezzanine		N/Q/R/W		5th & Madison Avs are skipped
7/<7>	10th & 9th Avs are skipped	Penn Station (platform level)					B/D/F/<F>/M		5th & Madison Avs are skipped

=== Entrances and exits ===
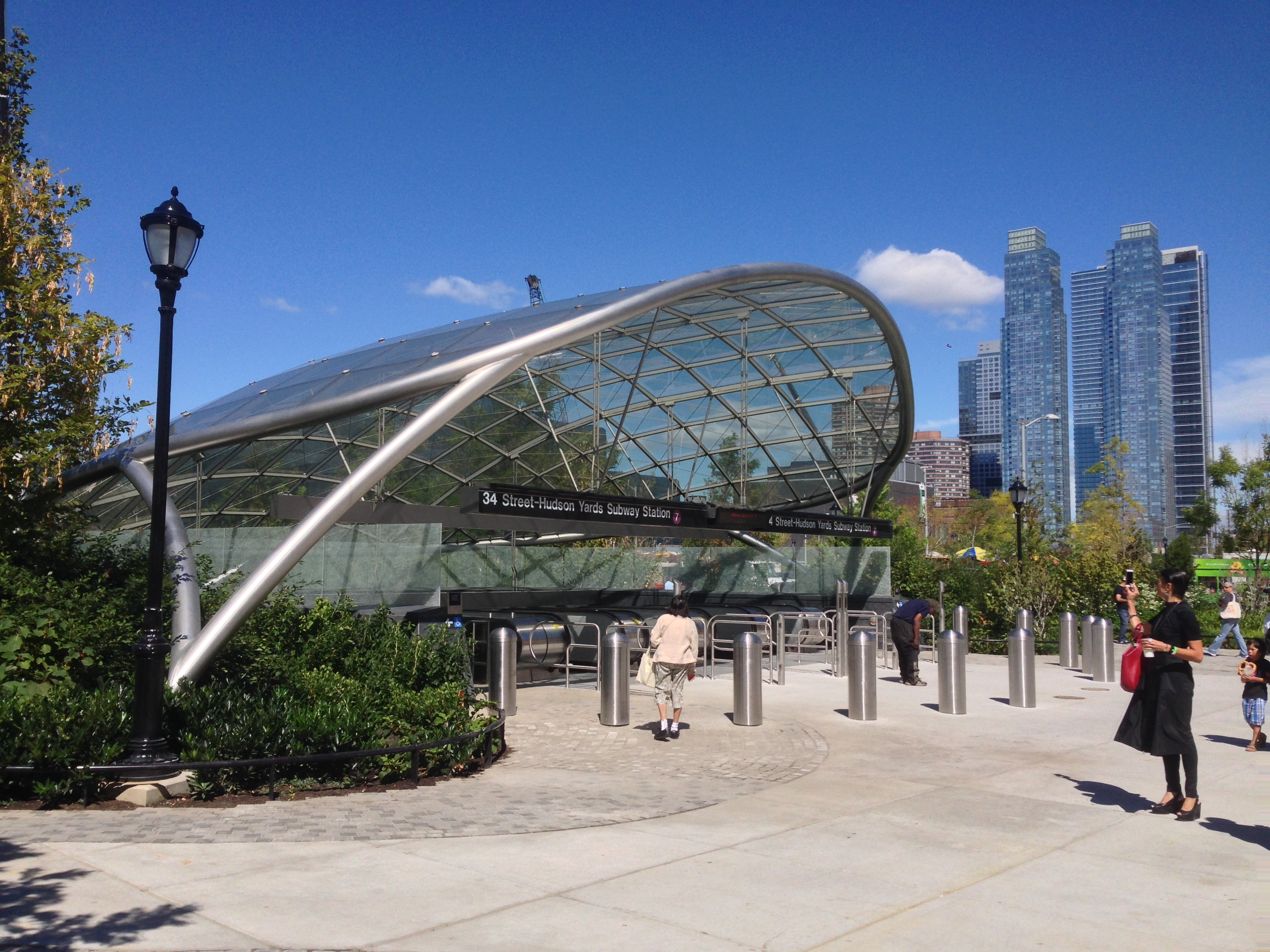
Main station entrance seen from 33rd Street

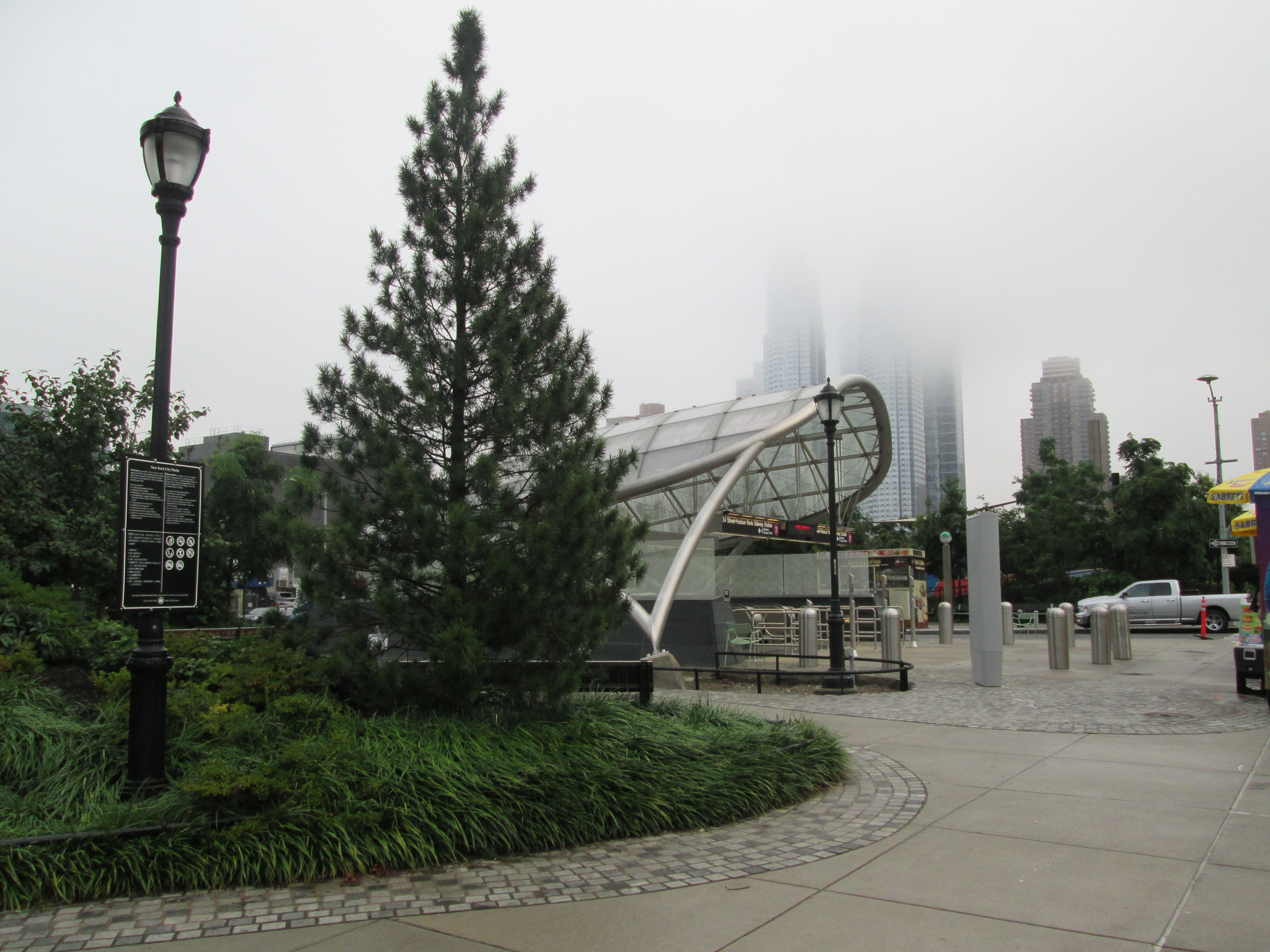
Secondary station entrance seen from Hudson Boulevard

The station has two entrances and exits. The main station entrance and ventilation building consists of four escalators and an elevator on the west side of Hudson Boulevard between 33rd and 34th Streets. The main entrance has a turtle shell-shaped glass canopy above it that allows light to shine on the upper mezzanine. The elevator is located south of 34th Street in Hudson Park, while the escalator entrance is located further east, closer to the boulevard. At the time of construction, the ventilation building was designed so developers could build on top of it later. The 55 Hudson Yards skyscraper, whose structure is partially atop the ventilation tower, started construction in January 2015, and pictures in May 2016 showed that the skyscraper had so far been constructed to the height of the ventilation tower.

The secondary entrance consists of escalators on the southwest corner of Hudson Boulevard East and 35th Street, and opened on Labor Day 2018. At both of the exits, the staircases and four escalators each go down 40 feet (12 m) to a fare control area, then another 80 feet (24 m) to the common lower mezzanine.

Both entrances feature the glass canopy design, the first of their kind in the subway system. They are intended to stand out aesthetically. The entrances are interweaved with the Hudson Yards developments, with the main entrance wedged between 50 Hudson Yards to the east and 55 Hudson Yards to the west. The rest of the Hudson Yards development is located very close to the south of the station. Both entrances are based on a design by architect Toshiko Mori, which itself is based on the design of smaller station entrances in the Paris Métro.

In the preliminary plans, there was to be an entrance inside the 3 Hudson Boulevard building, near where the secondary station building is located. However, as both entrances were to use a glass canopy cover independent of any Hudson Yards structures, the 3 Hudson Boulevard entrance was shelved in lieu of a subway entrance directly to the east of 3 Hudson Boulevard. Another plan called for an entrance at the southwest corner of Eleventh Avenue and 36th Street to serve the Javits Center directly. Under this plan, the secondary exit would have been relocated to the north side of 34th Street west of Hudson Boulevard.

An underground tunnel provides a direct connection between the upper mezzanine level at the main station entrance and the 30 Hudson Yards building, which opened in 2019, and 50 Hudson Yards building, which opened in 2022. The tunnel provides direct access to The Shops & Restaurants at Hudson Yards.

=== Features ===
The station includes air-conditioning systems that keeps the station's temperature at 72 to 78 °F (22 to 26 °C) year-round. It also includes the largest ventilation towers in the New York City Subway stations. Originally, the new station was also planned to feature platform screen doors. However, plans for screen doors in New York City Subway stations were dropped in 2012, in part because of concerns over cost and maintenance. A former MTA official said in 2022 that, although the platform is strong enough to support the weight of platform screen doors, such an installation would have further delayed the station's opening. According to an internal study prepared for the MTA in 2020, the 34th Street–Hudson Yards station could theoretically accommodate half-height platform edge doors, though structural modifications would have to be made to the platform. Full-height platform screen doors were also feasible but would necessitate the installation of structural bracing and relocation of several mechanical systems, as well as platform modification.

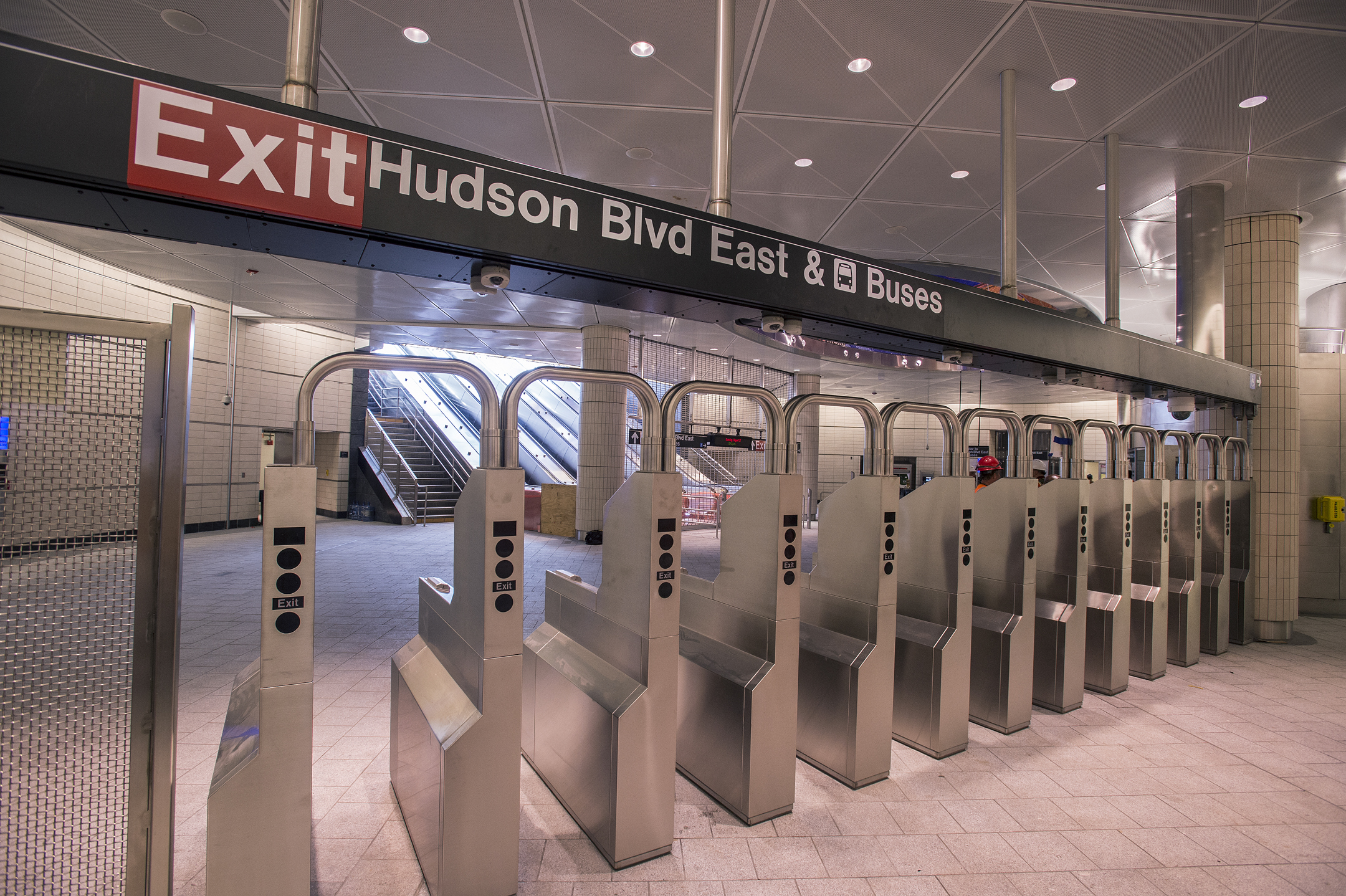
Large bank of turnstiles in upper mezzanine, built to accommodate future rush-hour crowds

Unlike most stations in the system, which do not have open public restrooms, there are public restrooms at 34th Street–Hudson Yards. The station also has a stainless steel oval-shaped station agent booth. The station's turnstiles are based on an obsolete design by Cubic Transportation Systems, which had stopped mass-producing subway turnstiles in 1994. The MTA contracted Cubic to manufacture turnstiles specifically for the Hudson Yards station because the MTA's reserve of spare turnstiles had been entirely destroyed during Hurricane Sandy in 2012.

Materials used in the station were designed to last at least 100 years. They include granite tile, ceramic tile, stainless steel panels on the walls, painted steel panels on the ceilings, energy-efficient fluorescent lamps and LEDs, and mesh. Additionally, the materials were supposed to conform to New York City Transit criteria, including slip-resistance. The station also uses acoustic ceiling tiles to reduce noise, in addition to using indirect lighting. The Hudson Yards station was also designed in accordance with National Fire Protection Association standards, despite its extreme depth, as it can be evacuated in six minutes in case of fire, and the platform can be cleared within four minutes.

The station is the third station in the New York City Subway to have low vibration tracks installed. These tracks are described by the MTA as providing a smoother, quieter ride for passengers, and they eliminate the need for wooden sleepers.

The station was not equipped with Wi-Fi or 3G at the time of opening, but these features were installed later. The station includes displays that accommodate the future inclusion of "countdown clocks" indicating the time until the next train, as well as Help Point emergency intercoms and in-station travel planners. Although the screens originally only displayed which track the next train would depart from, they started displaying countdown clocks when communications-based train control was implemented on the Flushing Line in 2018.

==== Artwork ====
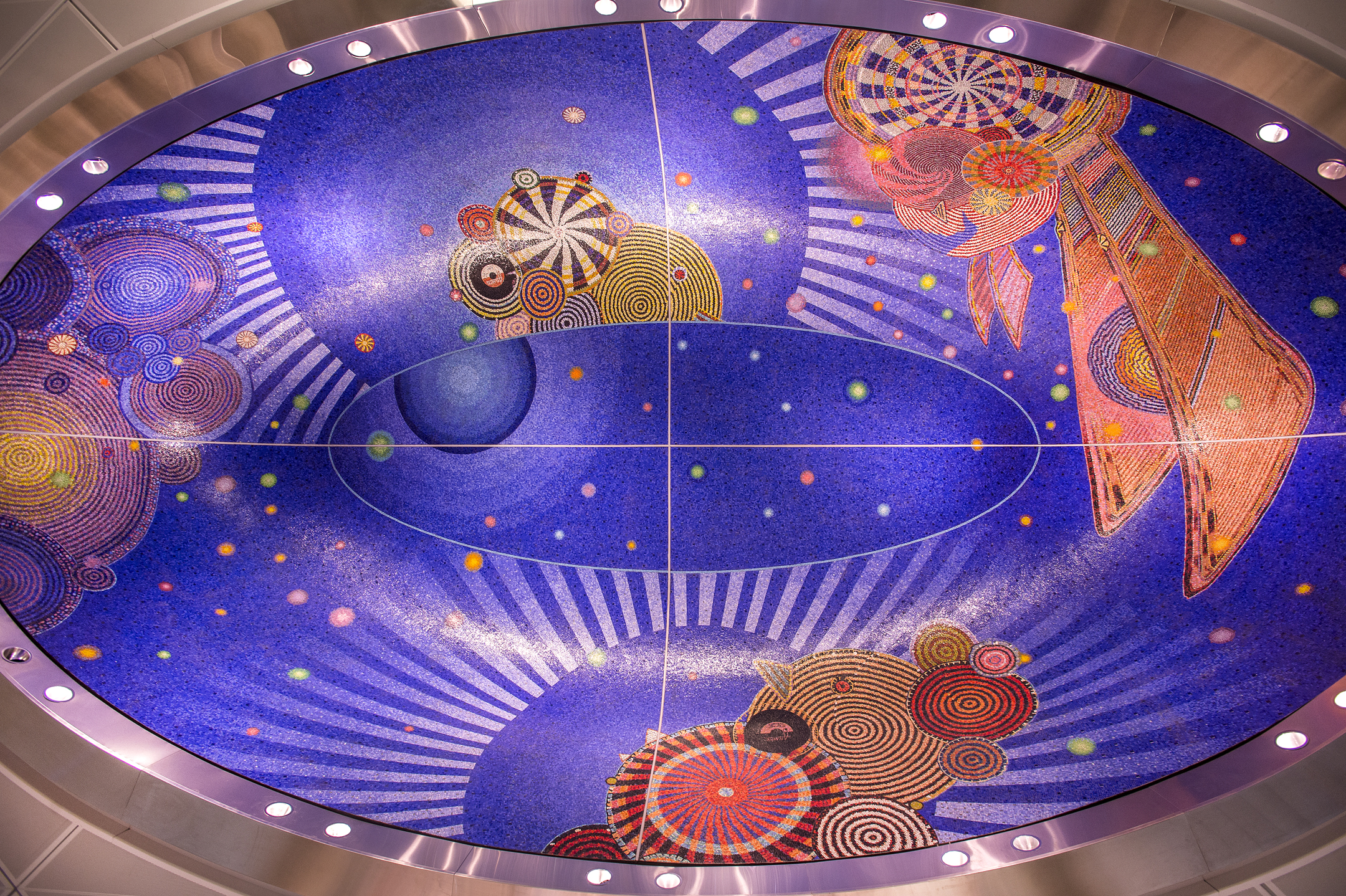
Funktional Vibrations by Xenobia Bailey

As part of the MTA's "Arts for Transit" program, three mosaics by Xenobia Bailey, which total approximately 2,788 square feet (259.0 m^{2}), were installed in three locations within the station. The artworks, titled Funktional Vibrations, are based on some of Bailey's crocheting patterns. One mosaic is located in an oval-shaped recession in the ceiling of the upper mezzanine at 34th Streets. The other two mosaics are located in the station entrances. The tiles used in Funktional Vibrations were created by mosaic craftsman Stephen Miotto, who manufactured the tiles in his Carmel, New York, studio. Another section of the artwork was installed at the second entrance. This is the only artwork in the station. One Newsweek writer observed that while the station was "very clean but also a little antiseptic", "cool", and "efficient", it was also "lacking all character" with its austere design.

==== Incline elevators ====
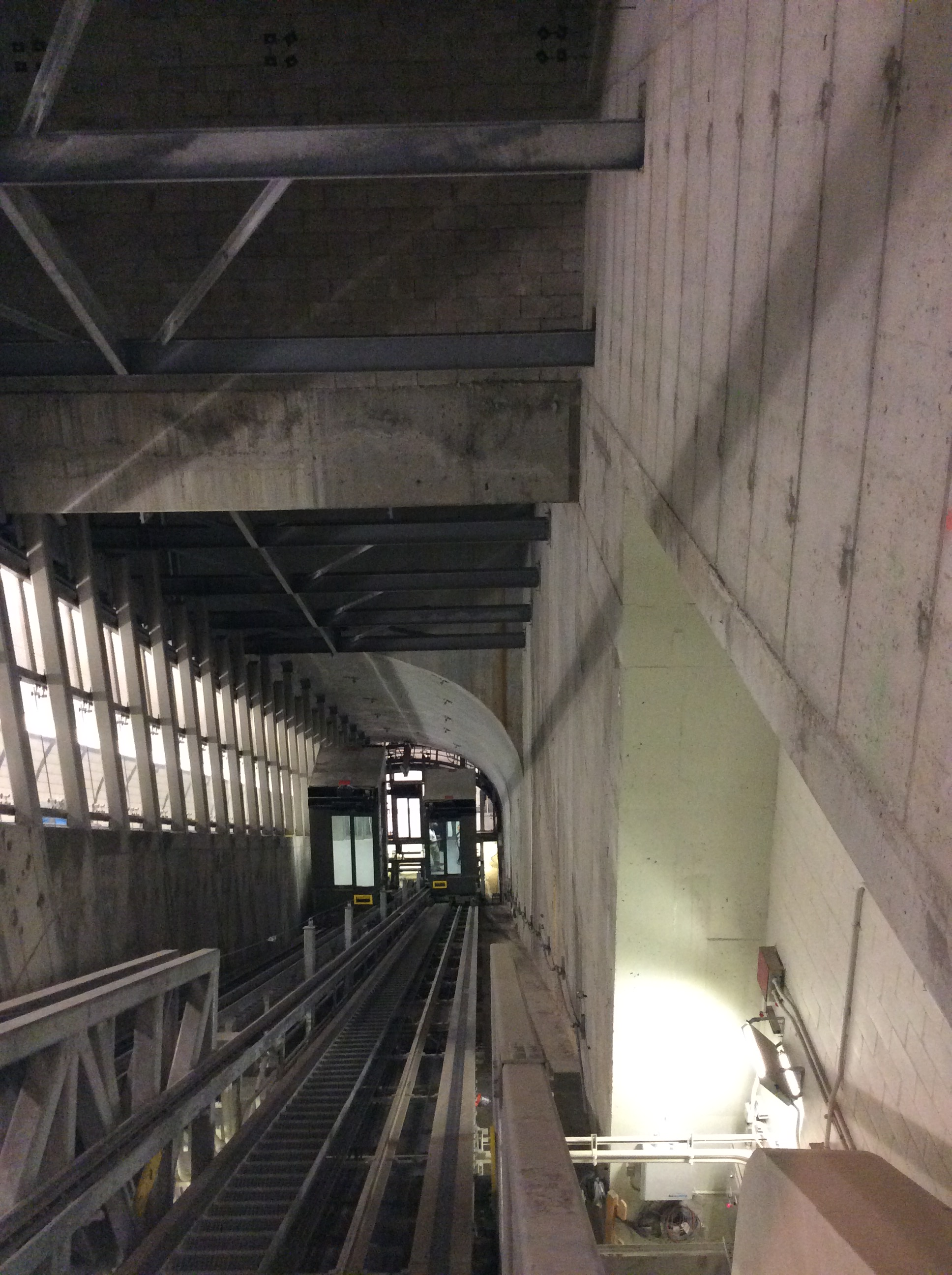
Incline elevators

The deep-level station is more than 10 stories below ground, making it among the system's deepest. The North River Tunnels and the planned Gateway Program tunnels, which pass under the Hudson River a block to the west of the station, pass over the station by approximately 35 feet (11 m). The station, which is 125 feet (38 m) below street level, and 108 feet (33 m) below sea level in total, is the third deepest subway station in the entire system, behind 190th Street and 191st Street stations; as a result, nine escalators were installed at the station. In addition, passenger access to the station includes a pair of custom-made incline elevators, which are installed in the southernmost of the two shafts between the upper and lower mezzanines, at the 34th Street end of the station. In April 2014, the first of two 172-foot-long (52 m) incline elevators was installed in the station. The elevators are relatively slow in order to discourage unnecessary use by non-disabled riders. These incline elevators make the station the first to be built to comply with the Americans with Disabilities Act of 1990 (ADA). (Note: There are other accessible New York City Subway stations, but the 34th Street–Hudson Yards station is the first to be built with ADA access in mind.)

The 80-foot (24 m) high incline elevators, which move at 100 feet (30 m) per minute (making an entire trip between the mezzanine levels in less than two minutes) and are sloped at a 27-degree angle, are the first of their kind in the system. Each elevator can hold up to 15 standing passengers or five wheelchair passengers. The inclined elevators were less expensive than vertically traveling elevators, and were installed within the large escalator shaft at 34th Street. However, as the incline elevators had originally failed a factory test by its manufacturer Maspero Elevatori, there were multiple delays in opening the station, and the opening date was eventually delayed from December 2013 to late 2014, then to mid-2015.

The use of inclined elevators was intended to provide wheelchair-using patrons with a shorter, easier path to the train platform as well as to reduce tunneling costs. The two elevators were manufactured by Maspero Elevatori, in Appiano Gentile, Italy, using a controller made on Long Island, speed governors made in Ohio, and buttons and other parts in Queens. The software for the elevator was written in the United States. Maspero Elevatori assembled the elevators in Italy, and they failed an operational test there, prior to being shipped to the United States. The MTA said the manufacturer chose to use American subcontractors in place of local Italian suppliers after reading the specifications the transit agency submitted. The MTA worked with the manufacturer to try to resolve the problems caused by a very high level of customization.

=== Track layout ===
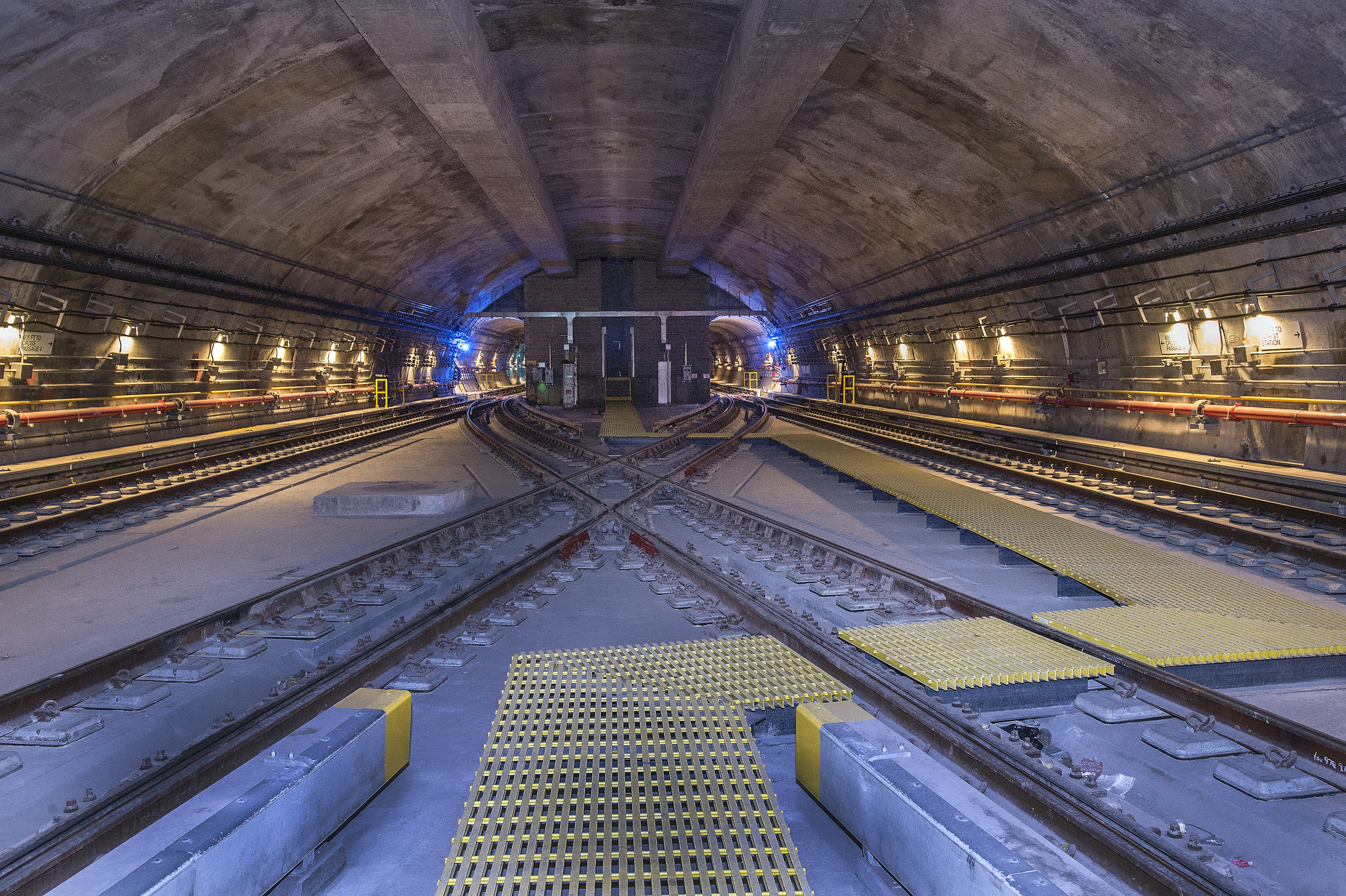
The diamond crossover north of the station

The tracks continue south, down to 25th Street, to allow trains to be stored south of the station during off-peak hours. There are also diamond crossovers at either end of the station. The storage tracks at this location were constructed due to the Corona Yard in Queens lacking space to hold any more trains, and expanding the yard is very difficult due to its location next to the Flushing River. A new storage yard elsewhere would be prohibitively expensive, as it would cost hundreds of millions of dollars.

== Ridership ==
Map of buildings and structures at Hudson Yards. Zoom the map and click on points for more details.

=== Projected ===
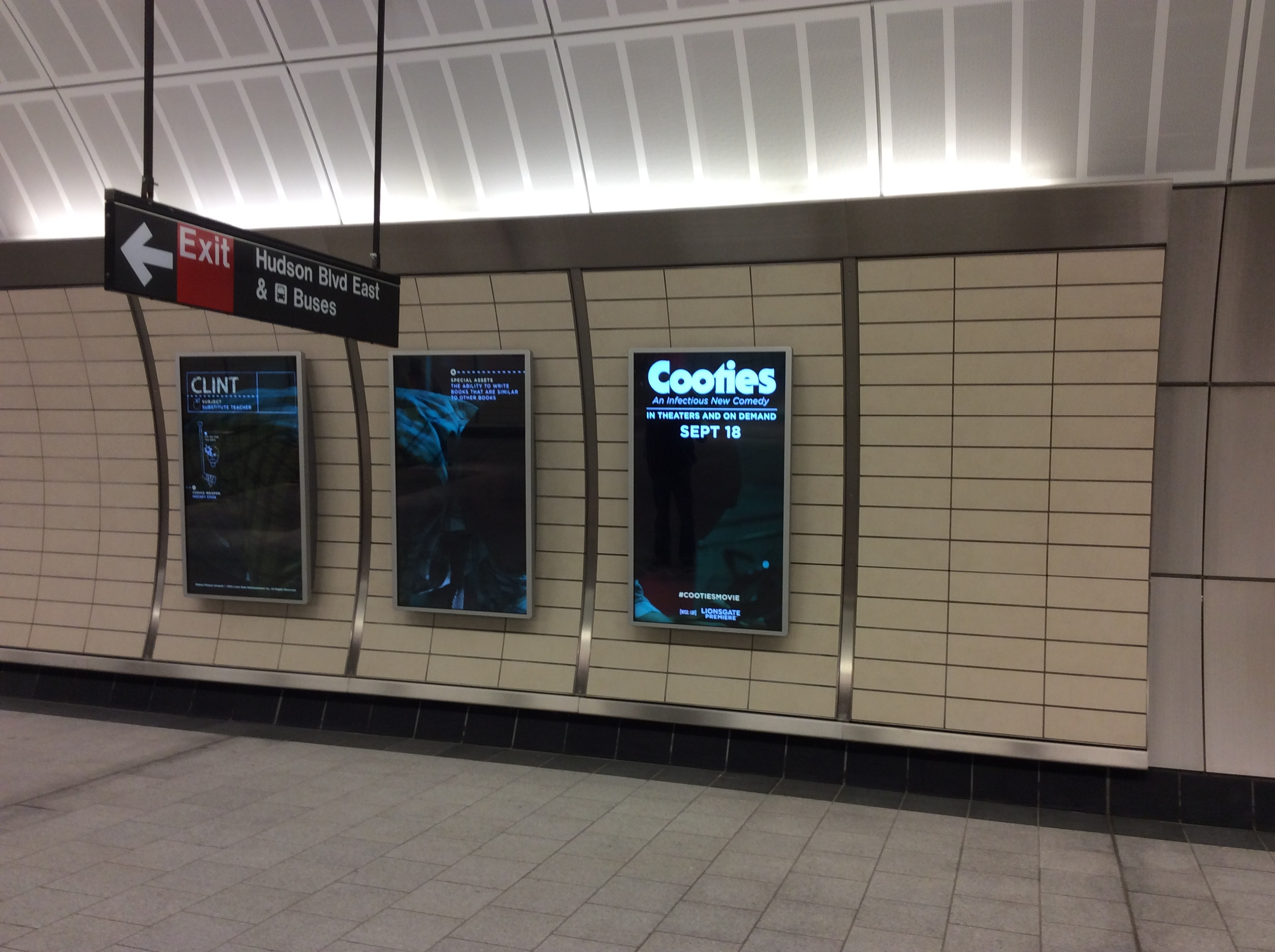
Advertisement screen on the lower mezzanine level

The station was expected to be very heavily used, due to its location as "the only subway line serving the area west of Ninth Avenue below 59th Street", as well as its status as the main subway station for the Hudson Yards area and the closest station to the busy Javits Center. Originally, the station was projected to serve 27,000 passengers per day, or about 9.855 million passengers per year, when it first opened. After the Hudson Yards is complete, ridership was to grow very heavily, with an average of 35,000 people per hour using the station at its peak by 2020. By September 2015, though, projections had increased to a proposed ridership of 32,000 people per hour. The projected 2025 ridership of 200,000 daily riders is more than at Times Square station, the station with the most ridership as of 2013 with 197,696 riders a day.

Projections predicted that during the morning rush hour alone, 26,000 passengers will be leaving the station, while 15,000 will be simultaneously entering the station. This will make it the busiest New York City subway station that is not a transfer station. The station is built to handle an even higher capacity of 40,000 passengers per hour during peak times and events at the Javits Center. The high projected ridership is despite the fact that it was once described as a station on an "extension to nowhere", given the relative sparseness of the area in 2007.

=== Actual ===
It was reported that only 7,000 daily riders entered the station between September 13–22, 2015, drastically below the MTA's projected ridership of 32,000 passengers upon the station's opening. This was attributed to incompleteness of developments in the area, as well as an unopened entrance to the High Line park, which is nearby. In late October 2015, AM New York found that the average daily ridership was even lower, at only 5,900 passengers per day, except for during the 2015 New York Comic Con on October 8–11, when average daily ridership reached 18,300 daily riders. The station's official ridership between September 13 and December 31, 2015, was 692,165, making it the 392nd busiest station in the city out of 422 total stations.

Ridership at the station increased in 2016 with 2,691,851 riders, making it the 189th busiest station in the city. 2017 saw an increase to 3,098,699 riders, still drastically below predictions, averaging out to about 10,000 per weekday. 2018 saw 3,189,867 riders, a 2.9% increase over 2017. 2019 saw a near doubling to 6,108,384 riders, making it the 69th busiest station.

== Effects ==
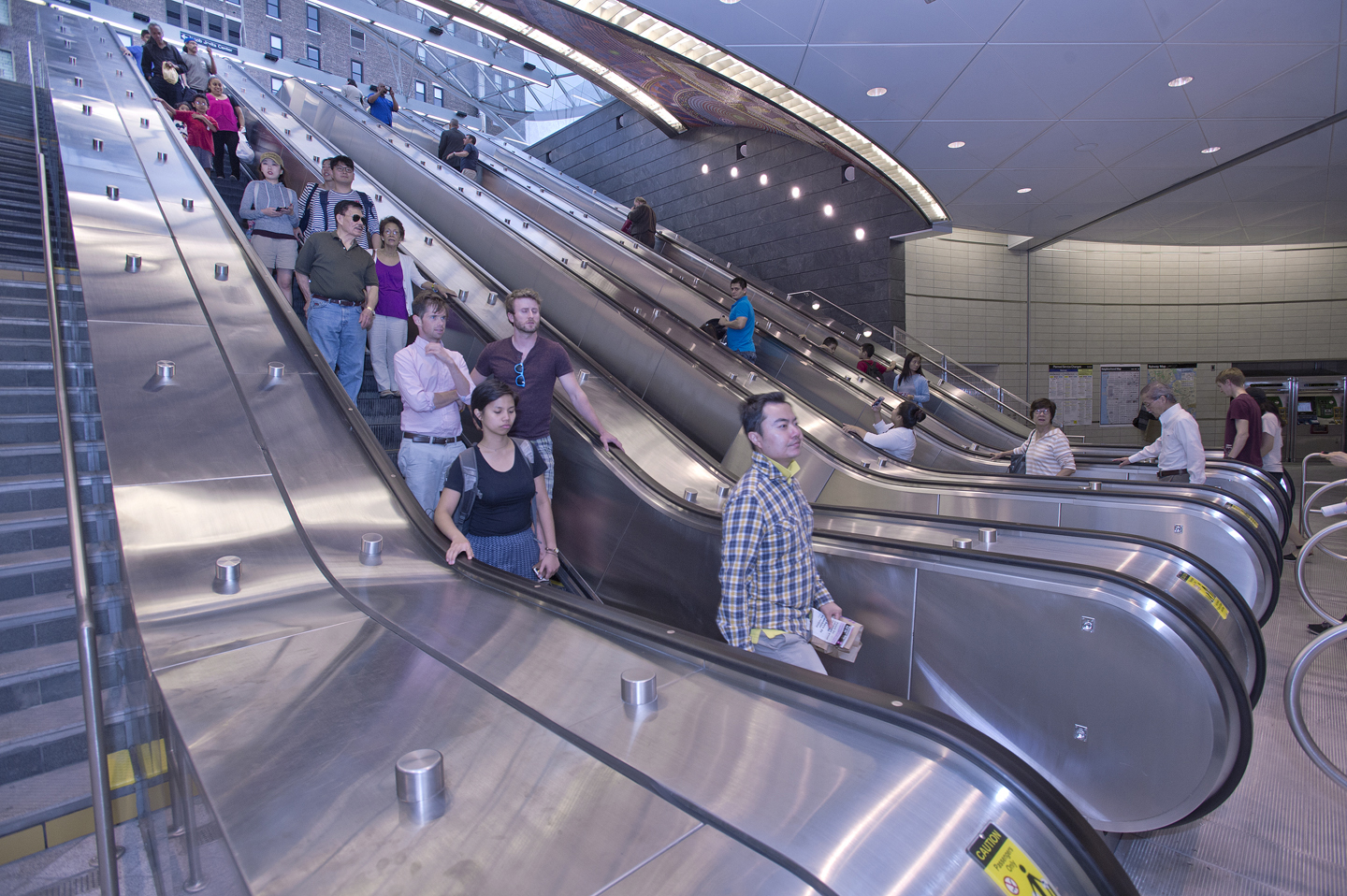
Escalators to the station exit

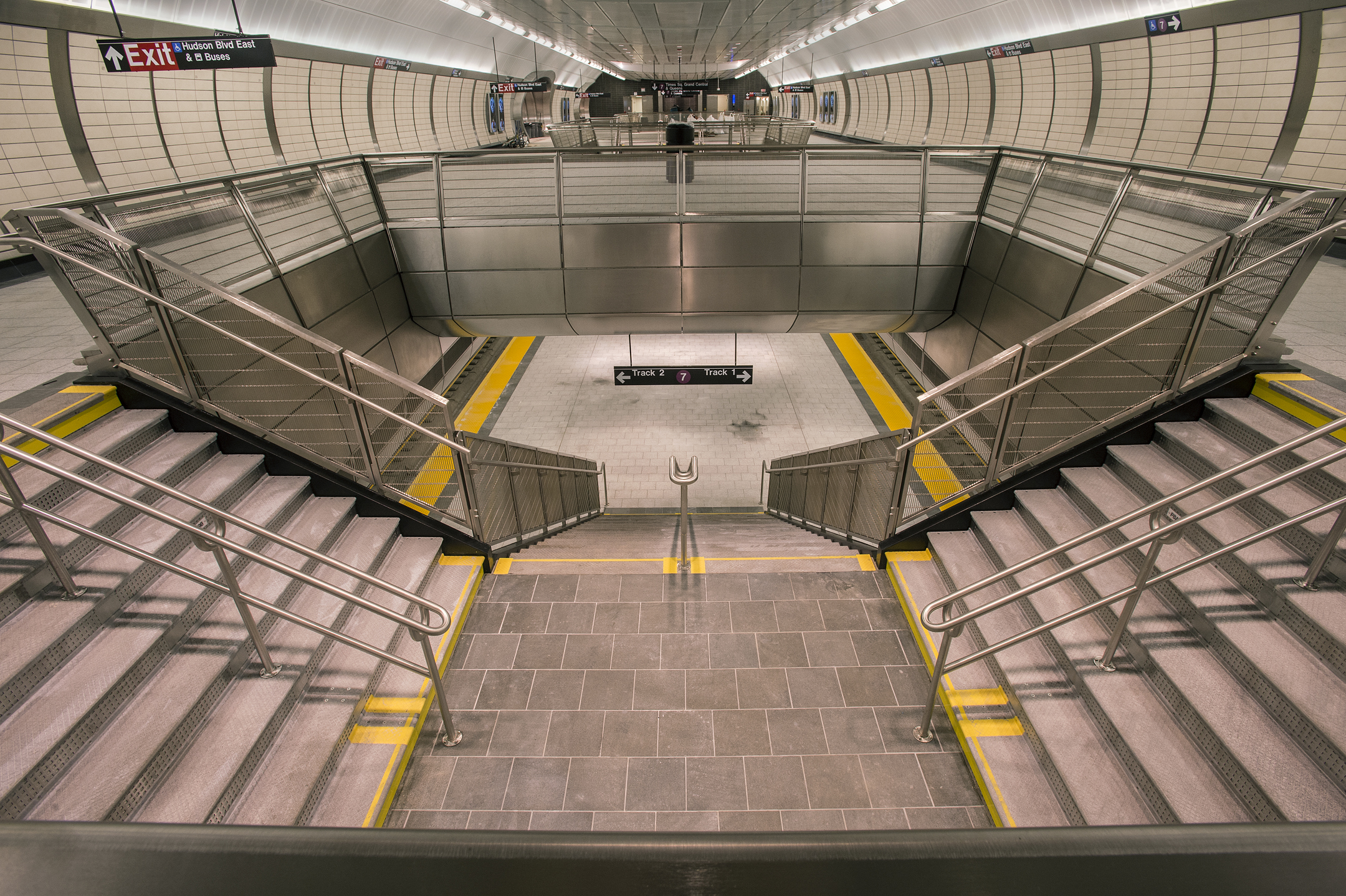
Stairs to platform level

Besides serving Hudson Yards, the area serves the Javits Center, western Chelsea and Hell's Kitchen, and a nearby intercity bus stop that serves passengers who are boarding FlixBus routes. The area to the west of Eighth Avenue and north of 34th Street was rezoned in 2005 into a commercial and residential area, and the station is part of an effort to accelerate development in the area. The reportedly "transformative" subway extension to 34th Street spurred development in the Hudson Yards area by providing transit access for future tenants of the Hudson Yards development. In addition, the extension fit within the MTA's goal of transit-oriented development, namely to "ensure that all new residential and commercial growth in the MTA region between 2008 and 2030 is concentrated within a half-mile of an MTA station". In addition to providing transit access to residents and tenants of nearby neighborhoods, the construction of the station was expected to bolster the area's commercial growth and, in turn, creating up to 50,000 jobs in the area.

Mitchell Moss, director of New York University's Rudin Center for Transportation Policy & Management, states that the development of Hudson Yards, and the related subway extension, were among the benefits of the 2012 Olympic bid, saying that "the #7 Extension will be one of the largest expansions of the New York City transit system in decades and one of the most significant in terms of its potential impact." Moss says that redevelopment of the west side was a direct result of the new subway station's construction. Kenneth T. Jackson, editor of The Encyclopedia of New York City, described the extension as "very important", but Lois Weiss of Bisnow wrote that the potential number of workers at Hudson Yards could overburden the station's capacity and nearby buses.

Since the station started construction, land prices in the immediate area have nearly doubled. Interest in the surrounding area has also grown, as many development companies are going to Hudson Yards to buy air rights; for instance Related Companies, already the developer of Hudson Yards, entered a contract to buy a $75 million-plus parcel of land between 35th and 36th Streets and between Eleventh Avenue and Hudson Boulevard, as well as land over a McDonald's to build 50 Hudson Yards. Also as a result of the subway extension, three tenants have already been found for 10 Hudson Yards, and Citigroup is considering moving to the area. Most importantly, however, the $750 million platform supporting much of Hudson Yards was built starting in January 2013; subway construction for a station that could potentially carry up to 27,000 daily passengers necessitated the construction of more buildings, as 70% of tenants are expected to come to Hudson Yards via the 7 subway extension. Additionally, new restaurants, luxury condominiums, and stores have appeared near the station and along the extension's route, and residential prices along the extension have also increased. A construction boom has occurred in the greater Hudson Yards area as well.

The station is described by the MTA as the centerpiece of the Hudson Park and Boulevard, as well as the entire Hudson Yards project, which developers say could not have been started without the 7 subway extension. Horodniceanu stated that "this new, modern station will be the lifeline of Manhattan's newest neighborhood. It will make it possible for thousands of residents, employees and visitors to get to Hudson Yards easily and quickly. Without the extension, this new development would not have been possible." The completion of the High Line and the Hudson Boulevard, as well as the Javits Center renovation, are boosting development in the area as well. Although Hudson Yards was not finished at the time of the station's opening, the High Line and Javits Center immediately became popular destinations for station patrons.

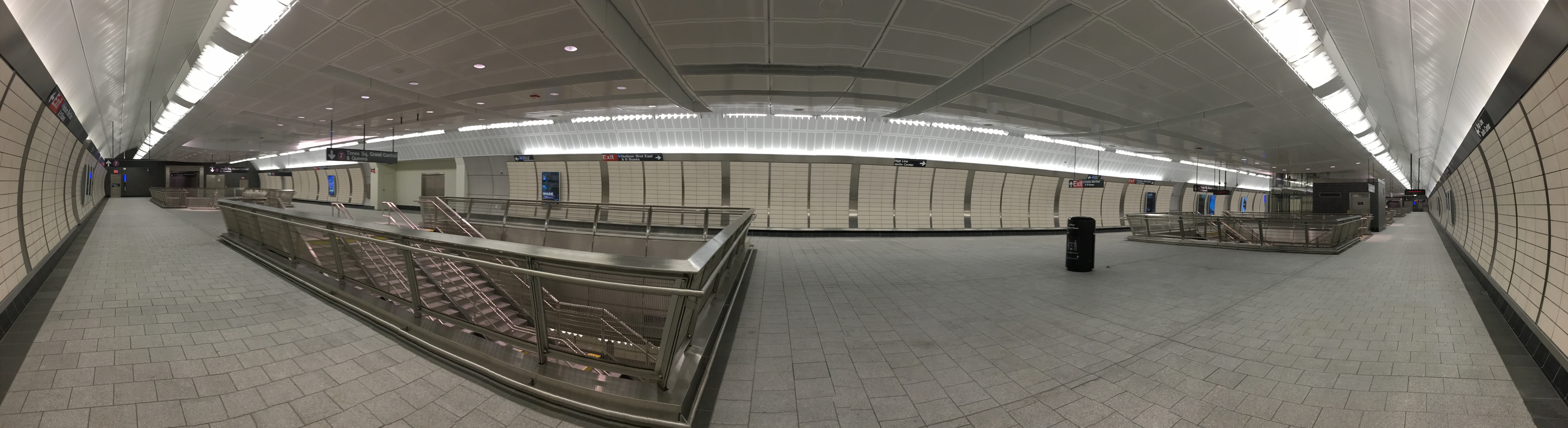
Panoramic view of the station's lower mezzanine
