= Xenobia Bailey =

American fashion designer (born 1955)

- Born: Sherilyn Bailey; 1955 (age 70–71); Seattle, Washington, United States
- Education: Pratt Institute; University of Washington
- Occupations: Fine artist, designer, and cultural activist
- Known for: Fiber art

Xenobia Bailey (born 1955) is an American fine artist, designer, Supernaturalist, cultural activist and fiber artist best known for her eclectic crochet African-inspired hats and her large-scale crochet pieces and mandalas.

== Early life and education ==
Born Sherilyn Bailey in Seattle in 1955, in the 1980s she changed her name to Xenobia for the warrior queen of ancient Palmyra and made her way to New York City. She began her professional life as a costume designer for the now defunct Black Arts/West and earned a BFA in Industrial Design from the Pratt Institute in Brooklyn in 1977. Affirmative action took her to the University of Washington where, she says, "the whole world opened up to me". She discovered ethnomusicology, the study of music and culture from around the world. She followed it with courses in tailoring and millinery at Seattle Central Community College.

In the late 1970s, she worked for the CETA program as an art instructor, which led her to meeting master needleworker Bernadette Sonona. It is here that Xenobia advanced her skills and learned how to create needleworks without the use of a pattern or template.

== Work ==
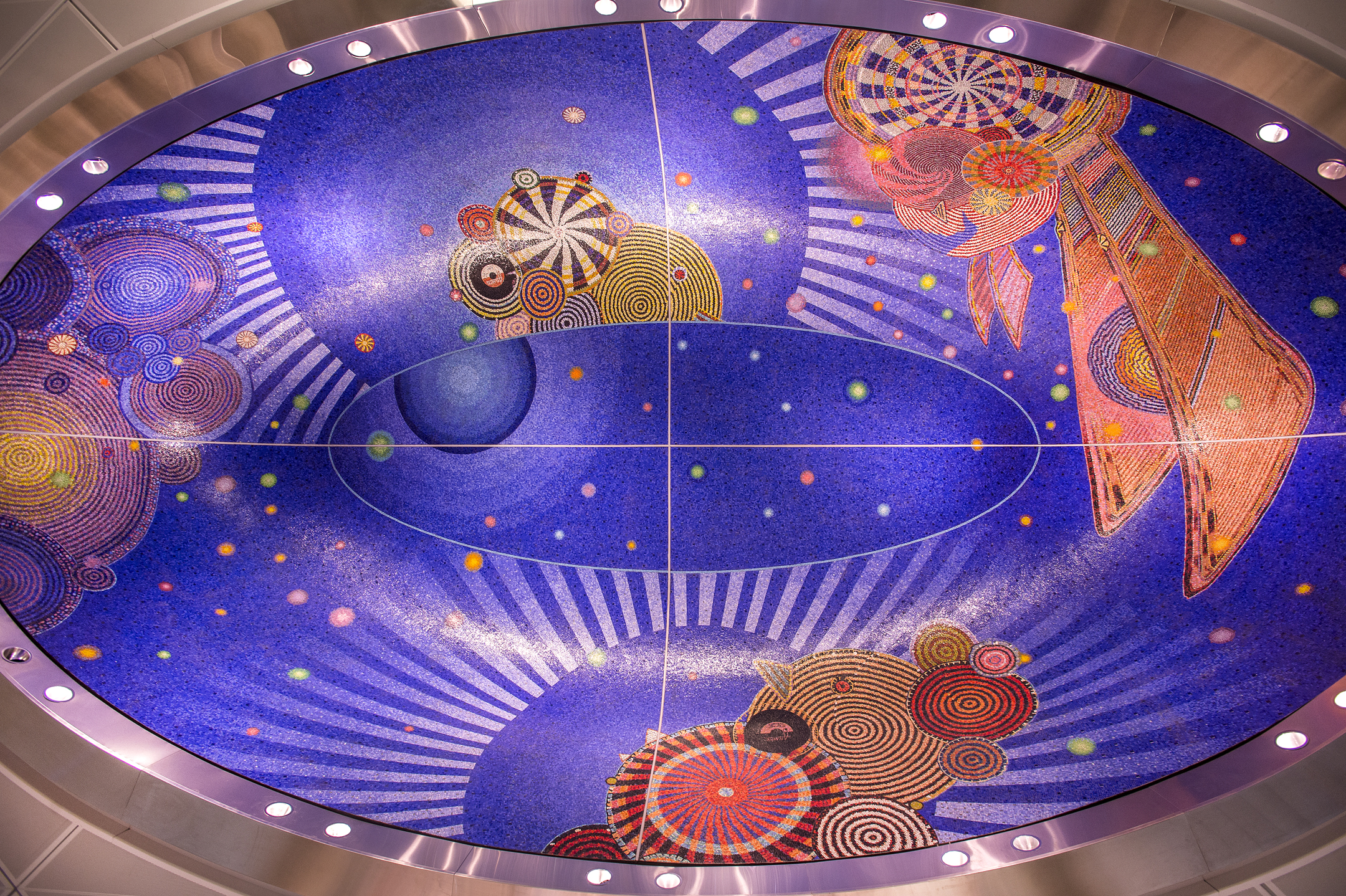
Funktional Vibrations, mosaic, 2016. At the 34th Street station

Bailey focuses on ancient African styles, reviving undocumented, non-commercial, engineered designs, artifacts and other cultural treasures from contemporary rural and urban homemakers. Influences on her work include economic culture and a wish to design experimental nature-based-futuristic, sustainable material culture in the aesthetic of funk for a skilled craft & masons labor force. She is concerned with social and economic development and the health and well-being for under-served rural communities that were socially erased during the Atlantic Slave Trade. Her large-scale crochet pieces and mandalas consist of colorful concentric circles and repeating patterns. Bailey's art work ranges from costumes, hats, wall pieces and newer digital images are "the far cry from the traditional shawls and doilies associated with the medium". Her pieces are often connected to her ongoing project Paradise Under Reconstruction in the Aesthetic of Funk. Bailey's work strives to create a textile culture and aesthetic that African Americans were unable to develop because of slavery and reconstruction.

"To be an artist and be able to create things – it's like fireworks every time you think about something," says Bailey. "I try to get energy and movement from something that is not moving at all."

Bailey's technique, of mostly circular rows of single crochet, forms a fabric classified as tapestry crochet in flat, geometric, highly colored designs influenced by African, Chinese, and Native American and Eastern philosophies, with undertones of 1970s "Funk" aesthetic. Her work draws upon the Kongo Cosmogram, or Yowa, a symbol important to Kongo metaphysics and spiritual ceremonies. Her signature stitch is a flowy line, as if it is dripping. She calls it the "liquid stitch". Her hats have been featured in United Colors of Benetton ads, on The Cosby Show, and in the Spike Lee film Do The Right Thing (worn by Samuel L. Jackson as DJ Mister Señor Love Daddy). She credits her shift from hats to walls to Chicago artist Nick Cave. Bailey's piece "Sistah Paradise Great Wall of Fire Revival Tent (Mandela Cosmic tapestry of energy flow)" was exhibited at Stux Gallery in Fall 2000. The piece was hand-crocheted with cotton acrylic yarns, with 10' high x 5' diameter. In 2000, Bailey received the Creative Capital Award in the discipline of Visual Arts.

In 2003, her designs were featured in an Absolut Vodka advertisement entitled "Absolut Bailey." Bailey has been artist-in-residence at the Studio Museum in Harlem, the Society for Contemporary Craft in Pittsburgh, and the Marie Walsh Sharpe Art Foundation in New York City. In an experimental collaboration sponsored by the Haystack Mountain School of Crafts and the MIT Media Lab, Bailey crocheted with electroluminescent wire. Her work has been exhibited at the Studio Museum of Harlem, the Jersey City Museum, the New Museum of Contemporary Art, and the High Museum of Art in Atlanta.

As an addition to her ongoing project Paradise Under Reconstruction, she created a hanging installation in 2006 called Mothership 1: Sistah Paradise's Great Walls of Fire Revival Tent. This piece was created to cover the topic of absent historical documentation for African enslavement in America.

In September 2014, Bailey partnered with students from Boys & Girls High School in Brooklyn to design and produce furniture to furnish a home for the Historic Hunterfly Road Houses. Sixty students, aged 14–17, designed three pieces for an imaginary couple moving into 21st-century Brooklyn using recycled materials.

In 2016, Xenobia Bailey created a large-scale glass mosaic at the Metropolitan Transportation Authority for the New York City Subway's 34th Street – Hudson Yards station. She named the piece Funktional Vibrations. Bailey crocheted the design for the mosaic; the Miotto Mosaic Art Studio then digitized it and translated it into the final mosaic. That same year, she also participated in the SITE Santa Fe Biennial.

Bailey was a 2018 artist-in-residence at the McColl Center for Art + Innovation in Charlotte, North Carolina.

In 2020, Bailey unveiled a new public art mosaic entitled "Morning Stars" at St. Petersburg's new Pier District.

In 2020, Bailey designed the public art work, permanently installed in the Grand Reading Room, in the Martin Luther King Jr. Memorial Library in Washington DC. The library was originally designed by German American Architect Ludwig Mies van der Rohe in 1972.

During the summer of 2021, Bailey realized in The Winter Garden at Brookfield Place. Mothership was on view June 28 under her canopy entitled Functional Frequency Environment.

In 2024, Xenobia Bailey presented her exhibition Paradise Under Reconstruction in the Aesthetic of Funk: The Second Coming at Venus Over Manhattan. This marked her first solo gallery show in New York City in over two decades, featuring approximately twenty recent and historical crochet works in an immersive installation.

== Collections ==
Her work is in the permanent collections at Harlem's Schomburg Center for Research in Black Culture, the Allentown Art Museum, the Museum of Contemporary Arts, the Texas Fashion Collection, and in the Museum of Arts and Design.

== Selected exhibitions ==
=== Solo ===
- 2002: Xenobia Bailey: Paradise Under Reconstruction in the Aesthetic of Funk—Phase IV (January 18 - February 17)
- 2008: Jersey City Museum, [RE]Possessed (June 16 - August 24, 2008)
- 2015: 34th St–Hudson Yards Station, Funktional Vibrations, Glass Mosaic, The Studio Museum in Harlem (Permanent Installation 2015)
- 2020: Morning Stars, St. Pete Pier, St. Petersburg, Florida (permanent installation).
- 2020: Permanent installation, Martin Luther King Jr. Memorial Library, Washington, DC

=== Group ===
- 2015: Xenobia Bailey (1955, Seattle) is one of the artists in the exhibition Fiber: Sculpture 1960–Present in ICA Boston, from October 1 till January 4, 2015. The exhibition also has a catalog in print form.
- 2017: Studio Views: Craft in the Expanded Field, Museum of Arts and Design, New York City (October 24 – December 17, 2017)
- 2019: Vibration & Frequency Experiment Funktional Material Culture Design Lab, Seattle at Wa Na Wari

== Honors and awards ==
In 2000, Xenobia Bailey won a Creative Capital grant for her project Paradise Under Reconstruction in the Aesthetic of Funk. In 2017, Bailey won the Americans for the Arts Public Art Year in Review Award for her artwork Paradise Under Reconstruction in the Aesthetic of Funk: A Quantum Leap, Starting From The Top…!!! In 2019, Bailey was one of the inaugural recipients of the BRIC Colene Brown Art Prize. In 2026, she was named a United States Artists (USA) Fellow.
