= Citarella Gourmet Market =

American grocery store chain

Citarella
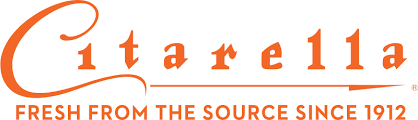
- Trade name: Citarella Gourmet Market
- Company type: Private
- Industry: Retail (grocery)
- Founded: 1912; 113 years ago as Citarella's; New York City, New York, US
- Founder: Mike Citarella
- Headquarters: New York City, New York, U.S.
- Number of locations: 10 (2023)
- Area served: New York City, The Hamptons, Fairfield County, Connecticut
- Products: Private label staple foods, organic foods and specialty products
- Owner: Joseph 'Joe' Gurrera
- Parent: Citarella Operating, LLC
- Website: www.citarella.com

Citarella Gourmet Market, commonly referred to as Citarella (/sɪttɑːrəllɑː/ sitta-rella), is a chain of upscale grocery stores operating in New York and Connecticut. Founded in 1912, the company initially specialized in seafoods in New York City, and has ever since expanded into the field of gourmet food operating in affluent locations. Citarella currently operates 8 markets and 2 wine stores. The locations currently include Upper West Side, Upper East Side, West Village in Manhattan; East Hampton, Bridgehampton, Southampton on Long Island; as well as one food and wine market in Greenwich, Connecticut. In January 2023, they announced a new location to open in Westhampton Beach, New York. Since 1983, Citarella is owned by Joseph 'Joe' Gurrera.

== History ==
Citarella was established by Mike Citarella in upper Manhattan. He specializes in seafoods and soon opens a store at 75th Street, where he occupied a small fraction of the Upper West Side store today (today's flagship location). In 1983, Citarella was sold to businessman Joseph 'Joe' Gurrera, who to this day still owns the company. He was already a well established entrepreneur who was active in the historic Fulton Fish Market. He created the new Citarella branding and in 1992 adds Lockwood & Winant, a seafood supply company, and therefore is able to eliminate all the middle man and enables him to buy directly from fisherman, bringing the freshest seafood into his store. In 1994, Gurrera diversifies in meat and opens a Citarella Meats, next to the seafood store. In 1995, Fish and Meat were combined into one larger store. In 1996, the family decides to bring in prepared foods and the gourmet market slowly begins to take shape, with current offerings. They open a warehouse on 18th street. Between 1997 and 2000, Citarella expands to a second floor on the Upper West Side, opens on the Upper East Side and in Water Mill, New York.

In 2001, Citarella tried to expand into the restaurant and food-to-go business. Citarella - The Restaurant was opened as a four-story Mediterranean-American eatery in the famous Rockefeller Center. The restaurant operated for five years closing in 2006. Attached to the restaurant there was a new concept established as well Citarella - To GO which also was discontinued. They had several new locations opened over the next decade; East Hampton (2002), West Village (2003), Bridgehampton (2009), Southampton and Greenwich (2014). In 2005, the warehouse moved to Hunts Point, Bronx to satisfy the growth of the business. In 2007, Gurrera started a new restaurant venture called Tutto Italiano in The Hamptons which was around for five years also before closing in 2012. In 2008, he added the seafood restaurant Fulton Restaurant, which was run until 2014.

Most recently, Citarella launched its current website in 2015, with the possibility to order online and nationwide delivery for seafood. In 2018, Joe Gurrera published his cookbook Joe Knows Fish.
