= 7 Subway Extension =

New York City Subway expansion

- The 7 and 7 Express (designated as <7> on rolling stock) services serve the entire 7 Subway Extension.

Overview
- Owner: City of New York
- Locale: Manhattan, New York City
- Termini: Times Square; 34th Street–Hudson Yards
- Stations: 1 constructed (1 proposed)

Service
- Type: Rapid transit
- System: New York City Subway
- Operator: New York City Transit Authority

History
- Opened: September 13, 2015; 11 years ago

Technical
- Line length: 1.5 mi (2.4 km)
- Num of tracks: 2
- Character: Underground
- Track gauge: 4 ft 8 1/2 in (1,435 mm)
- Electrification: 625 V DC third rail

The 7 Subway Extension is a subway extension of the New York City Subway's IRT Flushing Line, which is served by the 7 local and <7> express services. The extension stretches 1.5 miles (2.4 km) southwest from its previous terminus at Times Square, at Seventh Avenue and 41st Street, to one new station at 34th Street and Eleventh Avenue. A second station at 10th Avenue and 41st Street was dropped from the plans in October 2007. The entirety of the extension is located within the New York City borough of Manhattan. The extension, a key part of the Hudson Yards Redevelopment Project, is expected to bring business and entertainment to the area, as well as aid the redevelopment of nearby Chelsea and Hell's Kitchen, located around the Long Island Rail Road's West Side Yard. The extension also serves the nearby Jacob K. Javits Convention Center.

The project was originally proposed in 2005 as part of the Hudson Yards project, which included the failed attempt to build the West Side Stadium for the New York Jets and the city's bid for the 2012 Summer Olympics. Although the stadium plan was rejected by the state legislature, the rest of the Hudson Yards rail yard development, including the 7 Subway Extension, went forward. Construction on the extension started in 2007.

The extension's opening was postponed multiple times from its original target of December 2013. The delays were attributed to a variety of problems, mostly involving the 170-foot-long (52 m) incline elevators that were custom-designed for the new station. The extension opened to the public on September 13, 2015.

== Historical context ==
Map of the Manhattan portion of the Flushing Line, and nearby subway lines. The unbuilt 10th Avenue station is shown. The solid purple segment represents the pre-existing portion of the Flushing Line, while the dashed purple segment represents the new portion of the Flushing Line, and the dashed blue segment represents storage tracks south of 34th Street–Hudson Yards.

Proposals to extend the transit system to the Far West Side to support massive redevelopment were floated as early as 1969, when the New York City Planning Commission's (CPC's) master plan proposed to expand midtown westward along a 48th Street transit line to replace what the plan described as "blocks of antiquated and deteriorating structures of every sort" between Eighth and Twelfth avenues. That proposal for the West 40s and 50s failed after voters rejected a state bond issue that would have financed the proposed new east–west transit line or "people mover." Subsequently, attention shifted to the West 30s and IRT Flushing Line.

In response to the CPC's 1993 proposal to improve access to the Manhattan Central Business District, the Metropolitan Transportation Authority (MTA) began exploring the possibility of a 7 extension to New Jersey. In June 2001, a business and civic group convened by Senator Charles Schumer argued that a westward extension of the Midtown office district could not be accomplished without a subway extension, saying:

The long blocks along the avenues make the walk as long as 20 minutes to the westernmost parts of the area. In addition, there is no convenient link from Grand Central Station or elsewhere on the east side of Manhattan, making the Far West Side a difficult commute for workers from parts of Manhattan, Queens, Westchester and Connecticut.

In December 2001, the New York City Department of City Planning issued a study entitled Far West Midtown: A Framework for Development that recommended zoning changes and an extension of the Flushing Line to revitalize Far West Midtown. The government of New York City devised a rezoning plan for the Hudson Yards area and proposed two new subway stations to serve that area, with the extension of the subway to be financed by $2.1 billion of city-issued bonds. The project also included an expansion of the Javits Center and a proposed West Side Stadium, the latter of which was to serve as the venue of the opening and closing ceremonies and track and field events in the New York City bid for the 2012 Summer Olympics. The City wanted to get funding before July 2005, at which time the International Olympic Committee would vote on funding. However, due to shortfalls in the MTA's Capital Program, as well as preexisting funding for the Second Avenue Subway and East Side Access, the MTA could not pay to fund the extension. After the proposal for the West Side Stadium plan was rejected in 2005, New York City quickly lost its Olympic bid, with London hosting those Games. The subway extension was approved following the successful rezoning of about 60 blocks from 28th to 43rd Streets, which became the Hudson Yards neighborhood.

Mayor Michael Bloomberg's December 12, 2006, address to the New York League of Conservation Voters noted that in November 2006, the government began issuing bonds to fund the extension of the 7 subway to Eleventh Avenue and 34th Street. The $2.4 billion extension was funded with New York City funds from municipal Tax Increment Financing (TIF) bond sales that are expected to be repaid with property tax revenues from future developments in areas served by the extension.

== Construction progress ==
In October 2007, the Metropolitan Transportation Authority (MTA) awarded a $1.145 billion contract to build 7,000 feet (2,100 m) of twin-tube tunnel from the 7 train's then-terminus at Times Square to the then-planned shell of the 34th Street–Hudson Yards station. The contract was awarded to S3, a joint venture of J.F. Shea, Skanska USA Civil, and Schiavone. The extension's construction was overseen by the MTA's Capital Construction division. Dattner Architects, designed the 34th Street station. After excavating the new terminal's shell and creating the first 1,000 feet (300 m) of tunnel using the drill-and-blast method, S3 placed two tunnel-boring machines (TBMs) in the ground to dig the remaining 6,000 feet (1,800 m); as it dug, each TBM placed precast concrete liner segments to create the tunnel interior.

Early on in the project, it was announced that the new stations would feature platform screen doors. The stations (along with the new South Ferry station on the IRT Broadway–Seventh Avenue Line and the three Phase 1 Second Avenue Subway stations on the Upper East Side) would include special air-cooling systems to reduce the temperature along platforms. Due to its depth, the extension has ventilation towers, rather than the ventilation grates ubiquitous in the rest of the subway system.

However, in October 2007, soon after the announcement of the new extension, the 10th Avenue station was canceled due to an overrun of the $2.4 billion budget, and the MTA did not have an extra $500 million to build the 10th Avenue station. On December 3, 2007, the MTA conducted a ceremony at the Times Square subway station marking the launch of construction of the 7 train extension. The contractor began excavating the station cavern adjacent to the Javits Convention Center. One physical hindrance to the construction of the extension was the lower-level platform at 42nd Street–Port Authority Bus Terminal on the IND Eighth Avenue Line. The abandoned platform was partially razed to allow the 7 train extension to be built. In order for the TBMs to meet up with the existing lay-up tracks west of Times Square, the Eighth Avenue Line had to be underpinned to support the existing line.

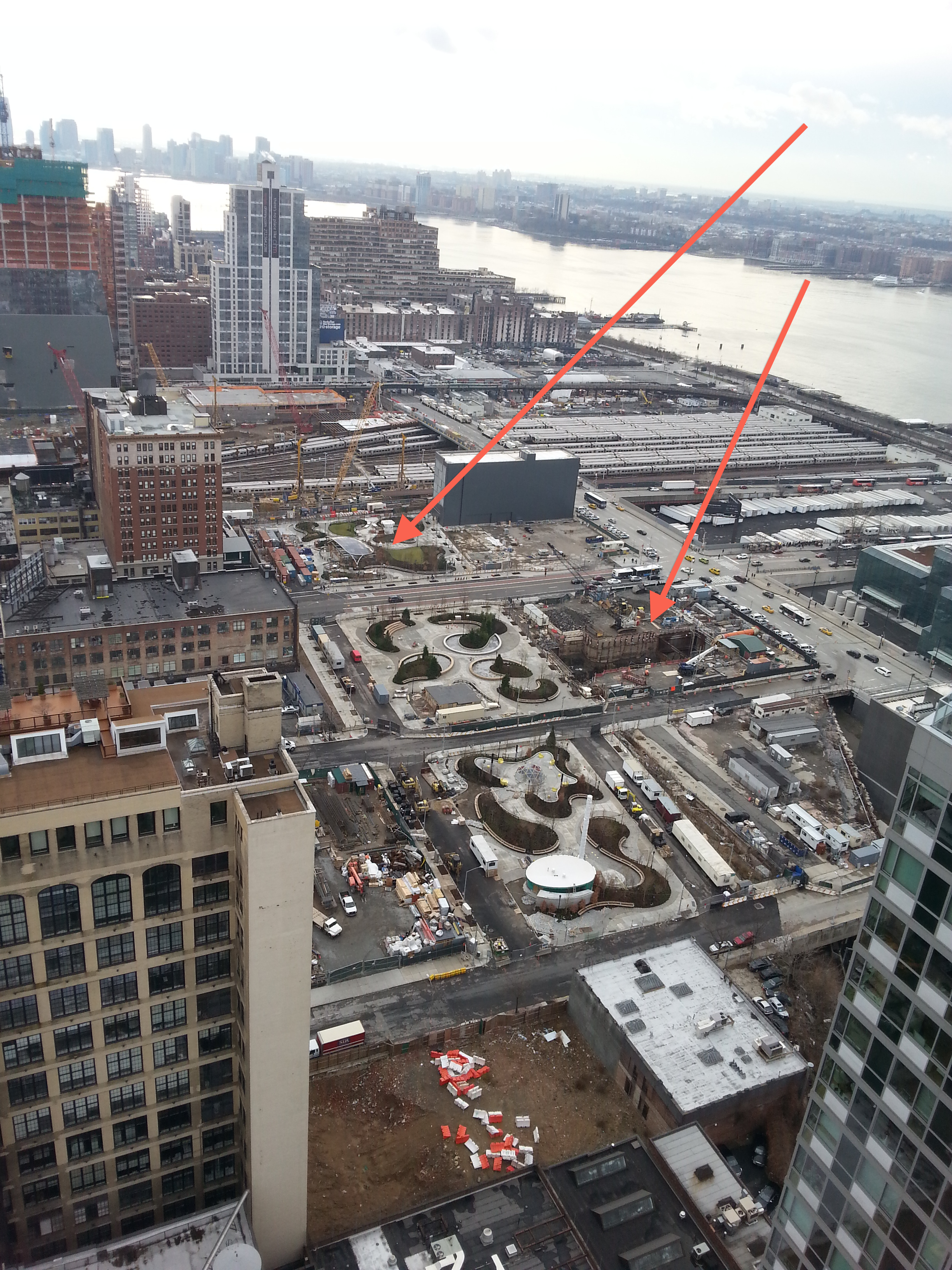
Overview of subway construction area with arrows pointing to the entrances. (Left arrow points to main 34th Street entrance; right arrow, secondary 35th Street entrance.)

In June 2008, construction on the tunnels began along Eleventh Avenue in Manhattan. In February 2009, S3 lowered the first of two tunnel-boring machines into a giant shaft at the corner of 25th Street and Eleventh Avenue. The two boring machines dug parallel 7,100-foot (2,200 m) long tunnels north along Eleventh Avenue to the current terminus of the 7 service at 41st Street and Times Square. The MTA posted a construction update with photographs on its website in November 2008, showing substantial progress.

The MTA completed excavation of a 150-foot (46 m) long cavern in June 2009. The cavern was dug below the bus entrance ramp to the lower level of the Port Authority Bus Terminal and formed part of the eastern end of the planned new extension, connecting it to the Times Square station. At the same time, tunnels were being dug northward from the machine shaft at 26th Street; soft ground at 27th and 28th Street required 300 feet (91 m) of ground to be frozen so that the tunnel-boring machines could easily dig through the soil. On December 21, 2009, it was announced that a tunnel-boring machine broke through the 34th Street station cavern wall. Both tunnel-boring machines were scheduled to finish the required tunneling in the spring of 2010.

In June 2010, one of the TBMs completed its tunnel at the cavern. The second TBM broke through the wall of the cavern on July 15, 2010, completing its tunneling operation. The TBMs were partially disassembled and backed up to the 25th Street shaft, where they were lifted out. In April 2011, the MTA announced that the contract covering the tunnels, the 34th Street station mezzanine and passenger platform was 85% complete, and that the systems contract, covering mechanical and electrical systems, electric power, lighting and train tracks would be awarded by July 2011. A second entrance to the station was planned. In May 2012, the MTA announced that the extension, now 65% complete, had received the installation of the first set of rails.

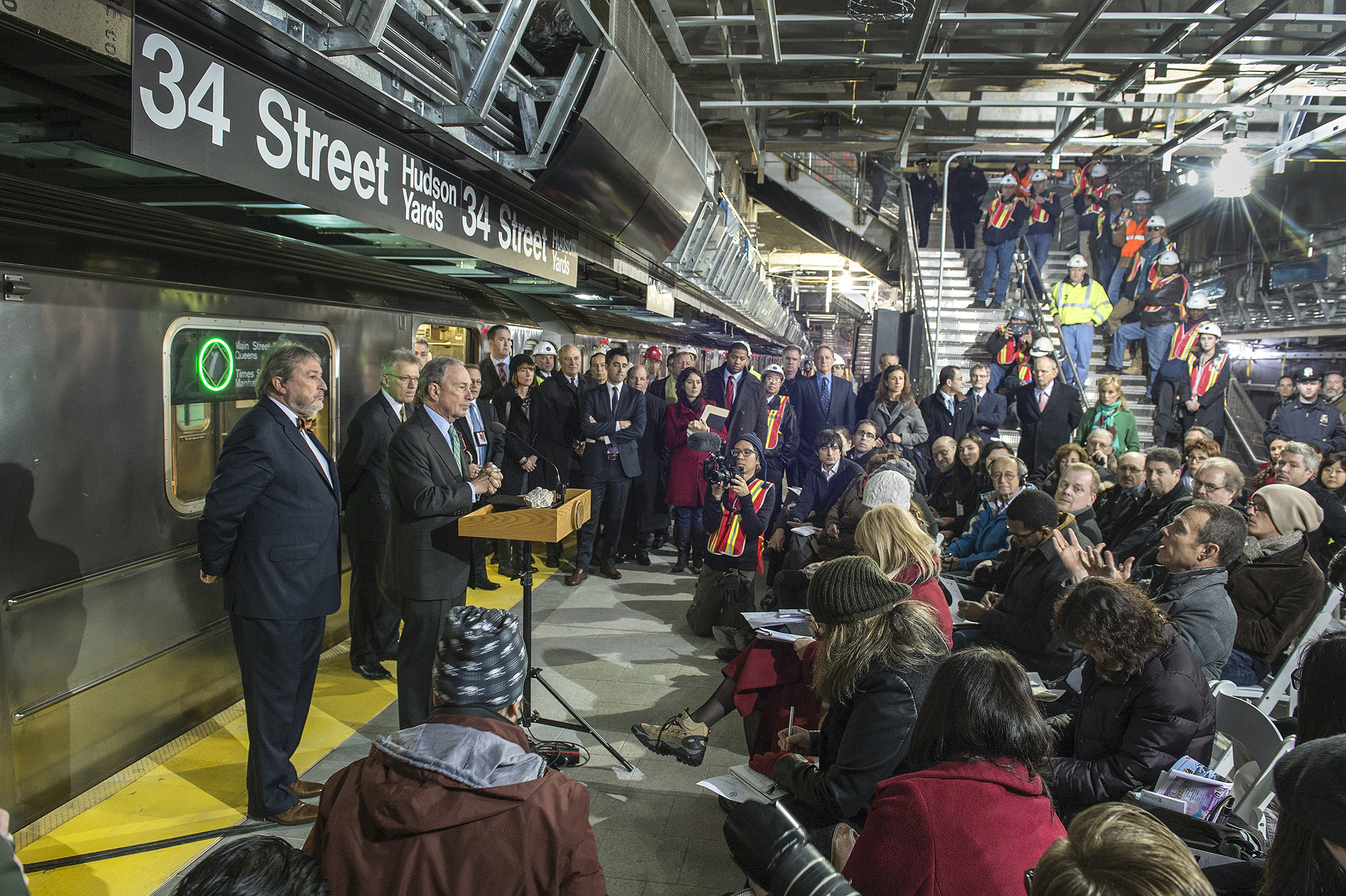
Mayor Bloomberg at the 34th Street station on December 20, 2013

On August 21, 2013, the MTA announced that the 7 Subway Extension was 90% complete. On December 20, 2013, Mayor Michael Bloomberg took a ceremonial ride on a train to the new terminal, celebrating part of his legacy as Mayor; at the time, the proposed opening date was June 2014.

=== Delays ===
Soon after Bloomberg's ceremonial ride, the opening date of the subway extension was postponed from June to early fall 2014, then November 2014, and then February 2015, and lastly to May 2015. Most of the problems were attributed to the incline elevators being installed in the station, and the ventilation fans in the tunnel.

On October 1, 2014, the MTA told the New York Daily News that the agency had signed a new agreement with the prime contractor, offering up to $4.75 million in incentive payments if the new station was finished and ready to open to the public by February 24, 2015.

Just two and a half months later, though, the MTA stated that it was unable to open the subway extension for service until between April and July 2015, due to the failure to get the inclined elevators to work properly. Problems with the security and fire alarm systems were also blamed for the delays. A December 2014 New York Post article attributed the delay to the Hudson Yards rail yard development's developer, The Related Companies', need to dig caissons for the foundations, just above the subway station, and the foundation work needed to be complete before the MTA could open the station. Continuing trouble with the fire and security alarms in March 2015 would delay the opening until that summer.

The use of inclined elevators was intended to provide wheelchair-using patrons with a shorter, easier path to the train platform, as well as to reduce tunneling costs. The two elevators were manufactured by Maspero Elevatori, in Appiano Gentile, Italy, using a controller made on Long Island, speed governors made in Ohio, and buttons and other parts in Queens. The software for the elevator was written in the United States. Maspero Elevatori assembled the elevators in Italy, and they failed an operational test there, prior to being shipped to the United States. The MTA said the manufacturer chose to use American subcontractors in place of local Italian suppliers after reading the specifications the transit agency submitted. The MTA had been working with the manufacturer to try to resolve the problems caused by a very high level of customization.

On June 1, 2015, a representative for the MTA described the extension as "99% complete". That day, test runs of 7 trains started running to 34th Street–Hudson Yards in preparation for the summer 2015 opening of the extension. However, on June 15, the extension was postponed again to "before the end of the third quarter". On July 20, 2015, it was reported that the MTA planned to open the extension to the public on September 13, 2015. The opening date was confirmed on August 28, 2015. The station was officially opened at a ribbon-cutting ceremony on September 13 around 1 p.m.

=== Gallery ===
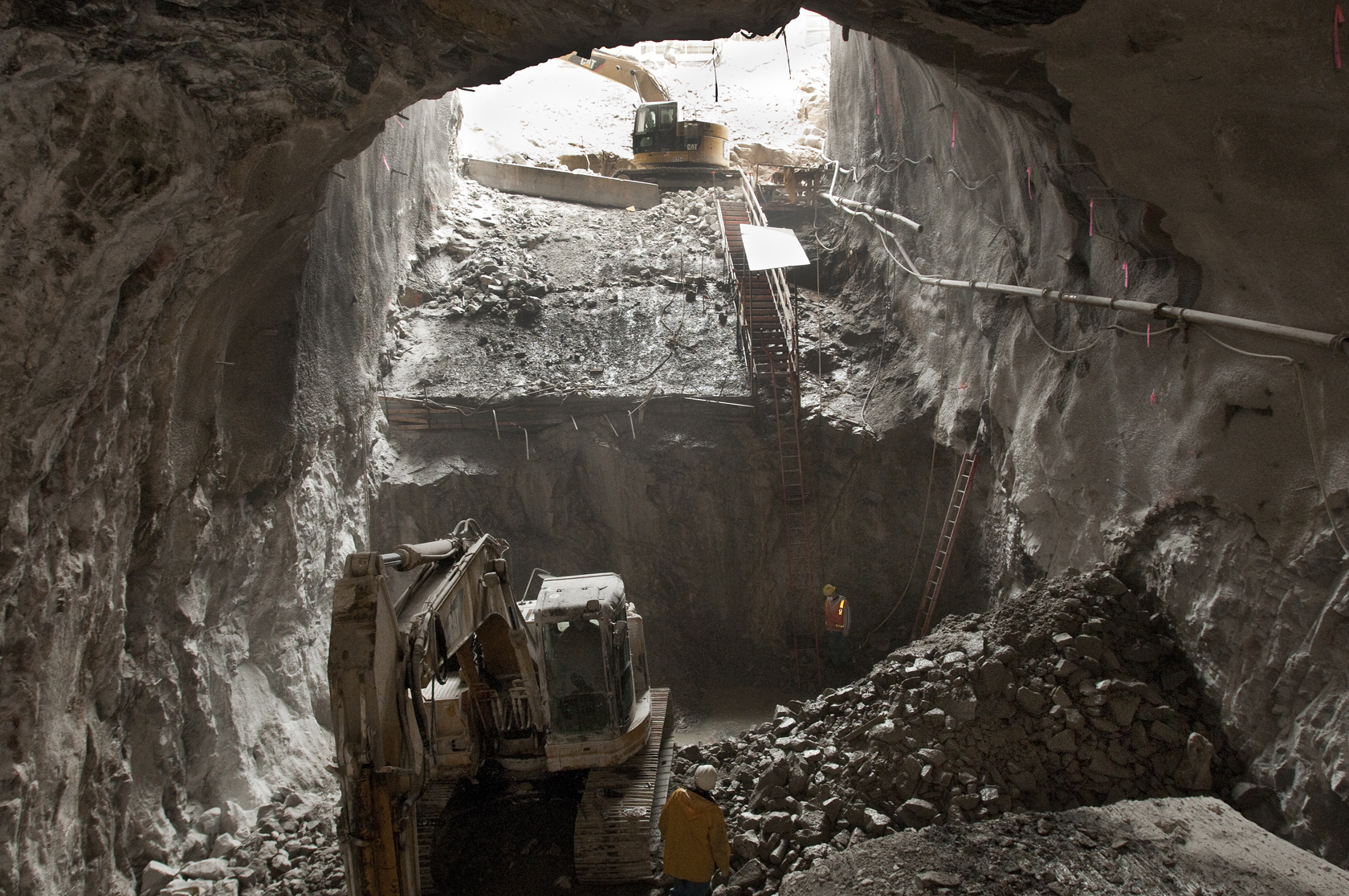
Digging the station cavern

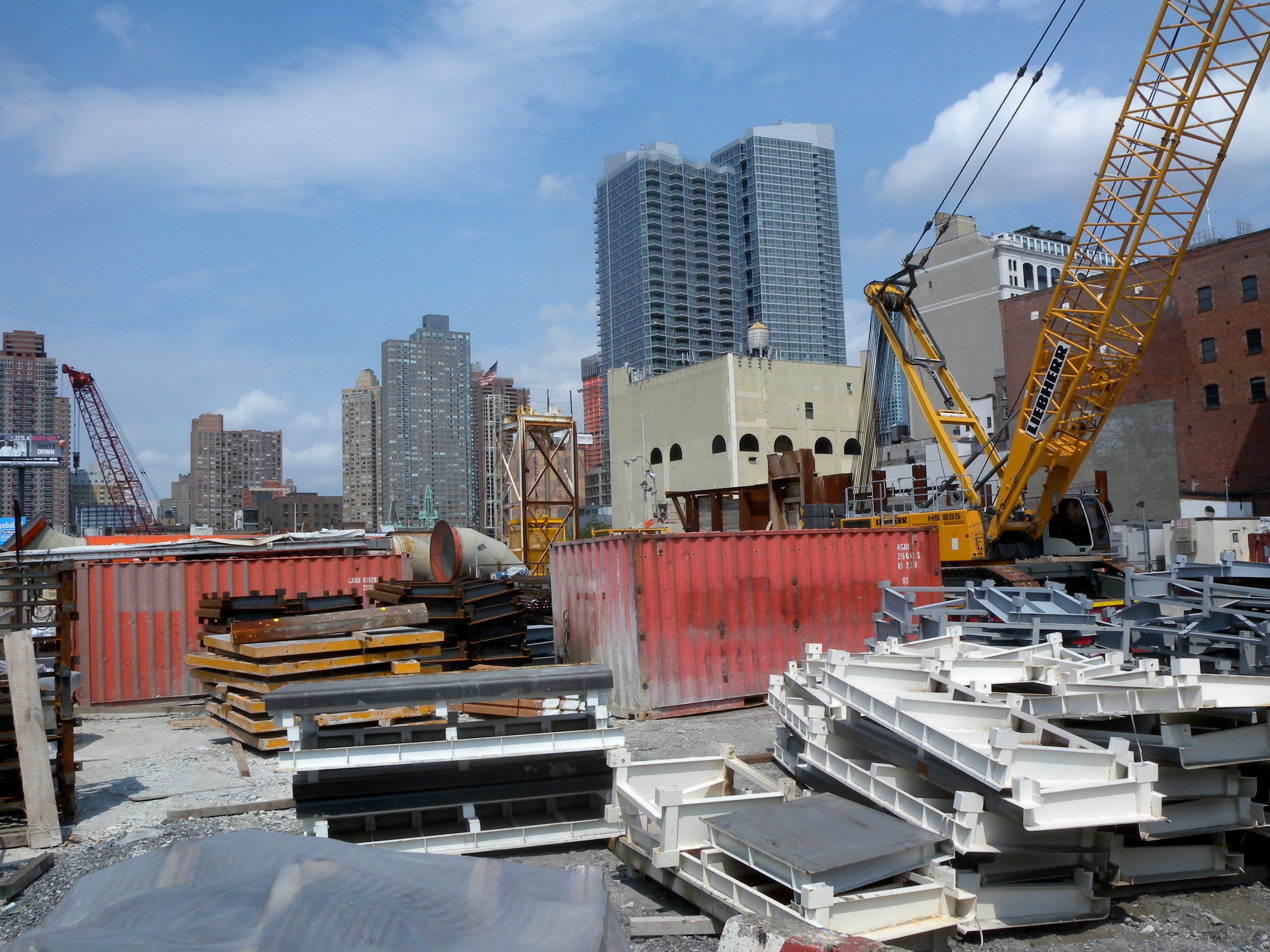
Construction Site P, 11th Avenue and 33rd Street in May 2010

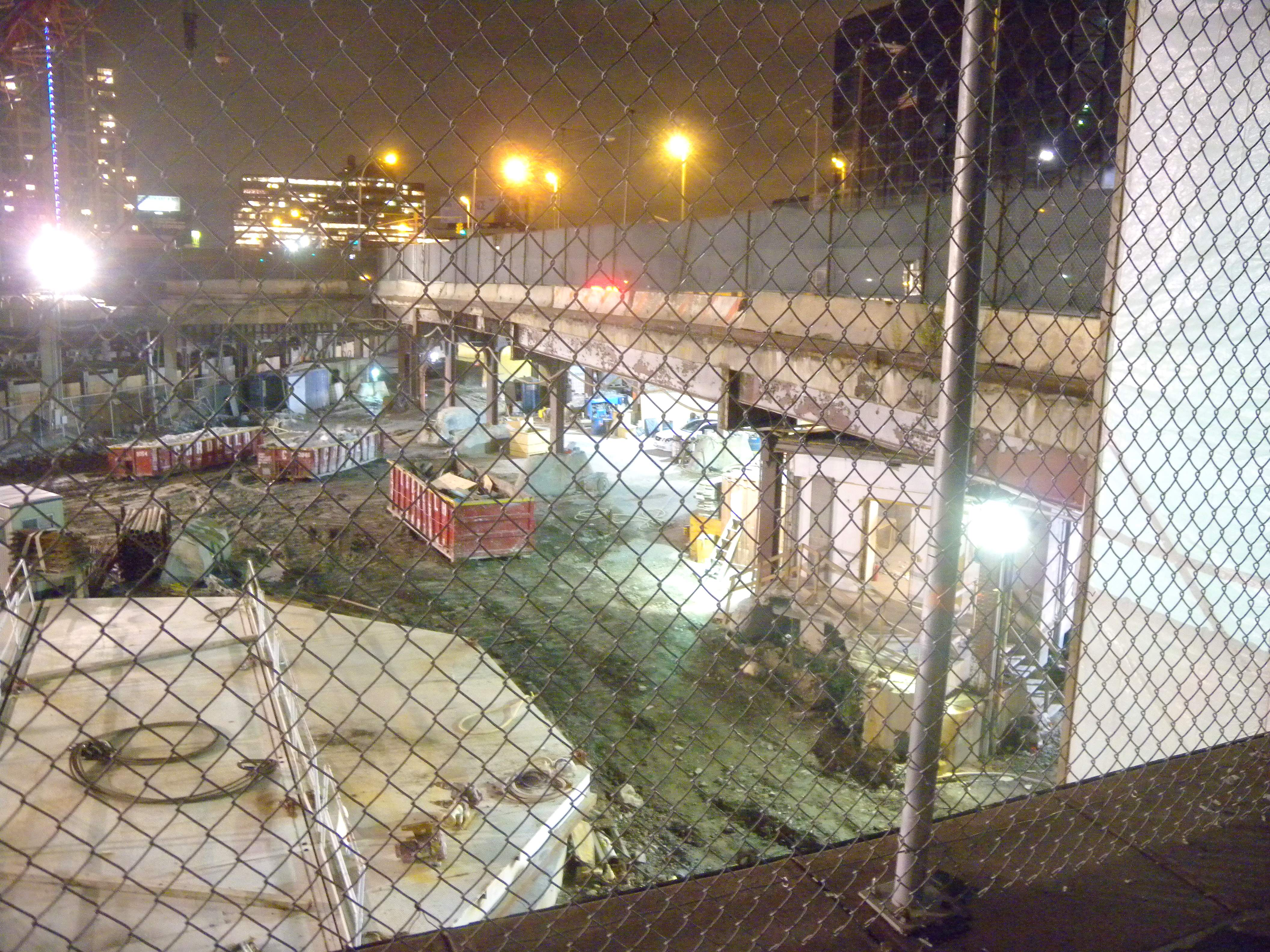
Extension work during night time

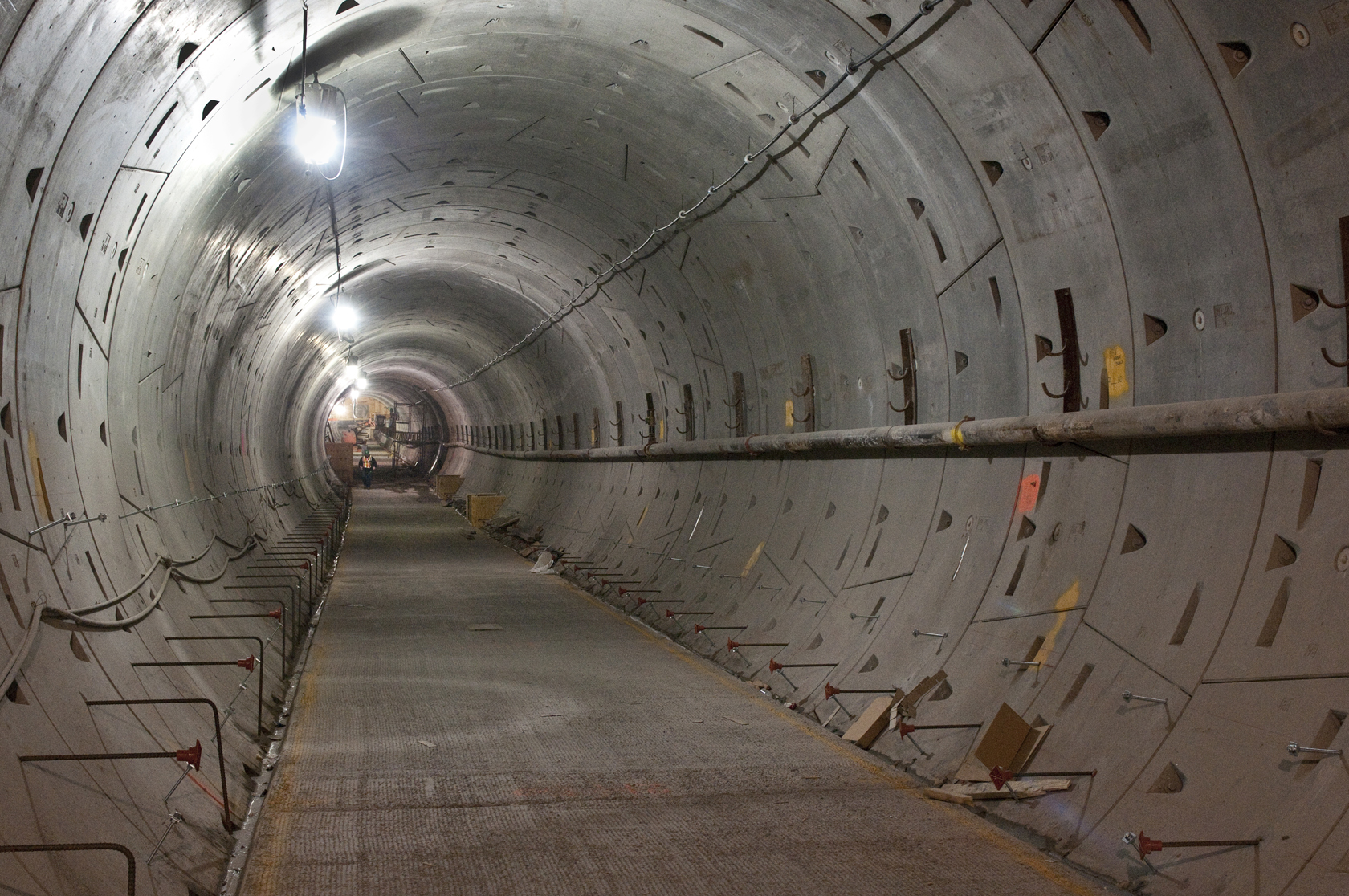
Tunnel under construction as of January 26, 2012

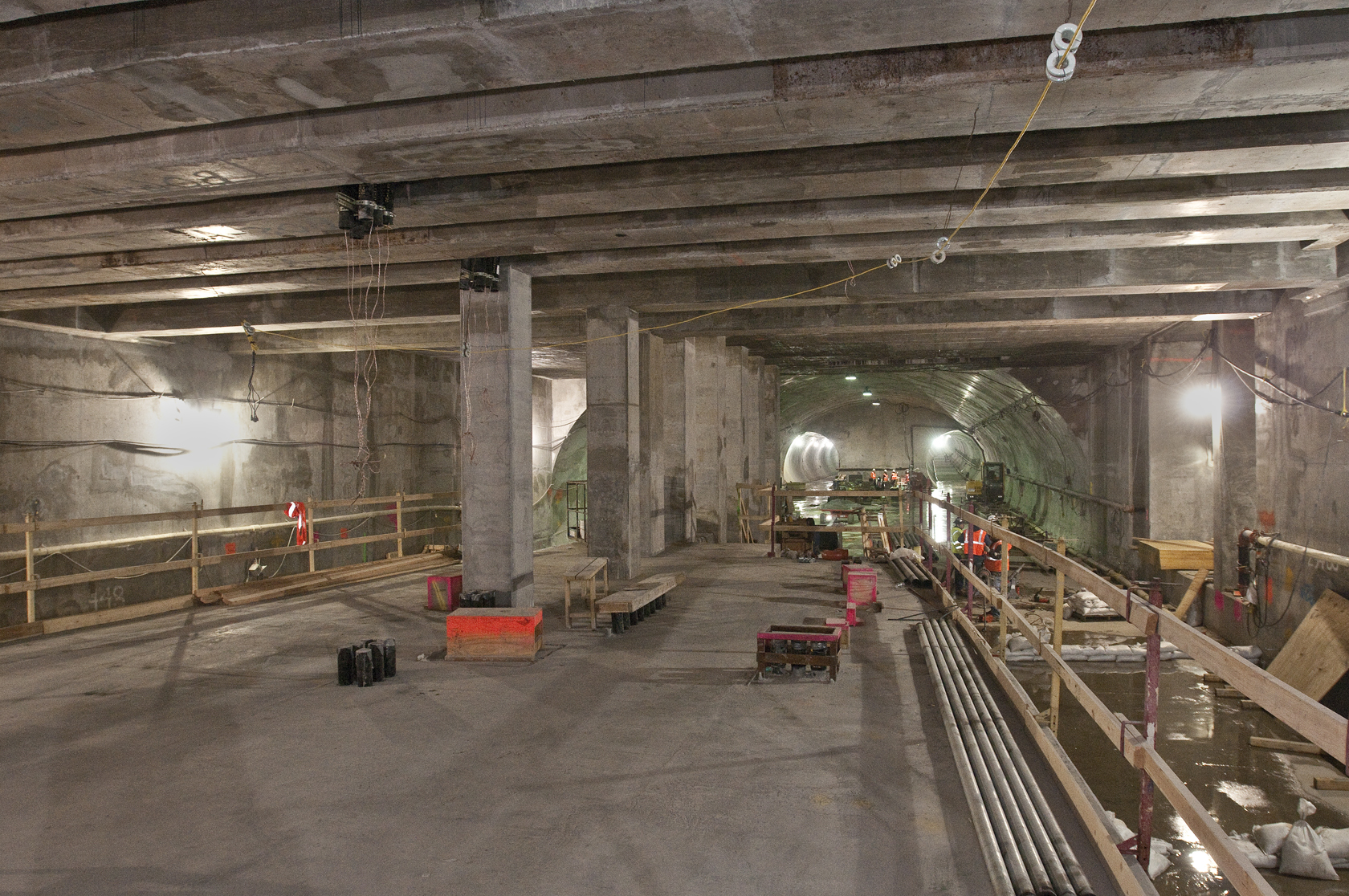
Mezzanine and trackways under construction

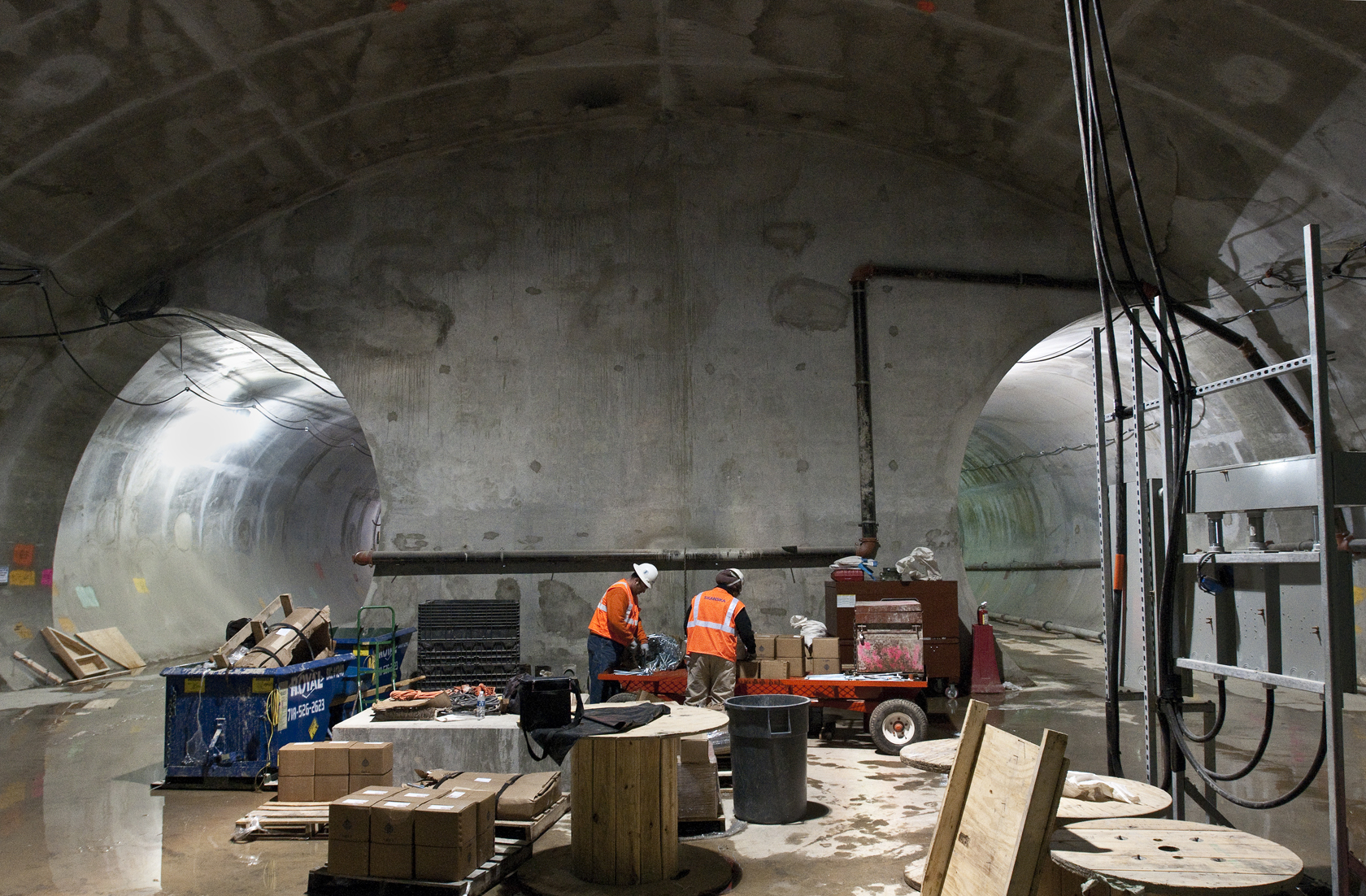
Tunnel portals at end of station cavern

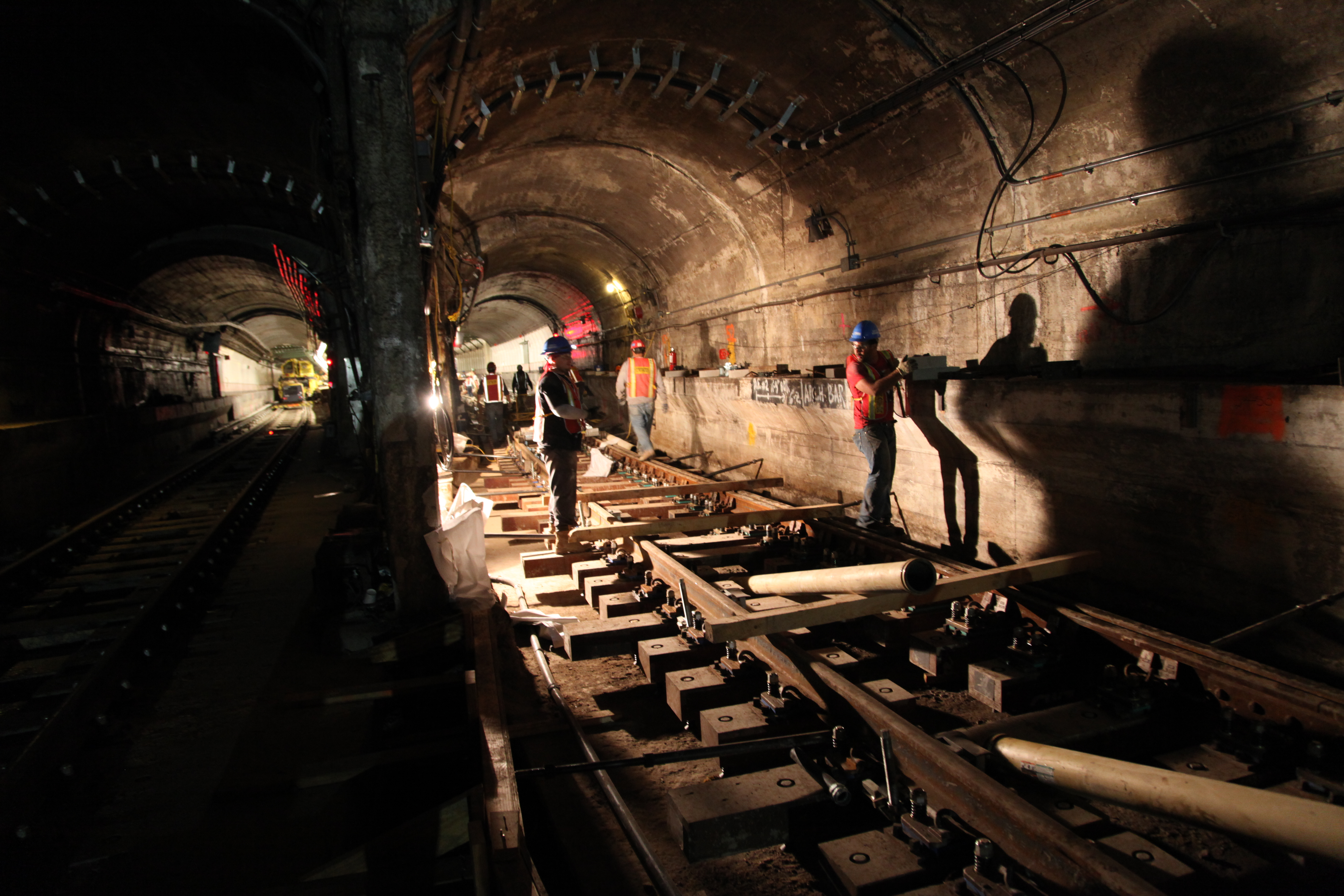
Building tracks connecting Times Square to the line extension in March 2012

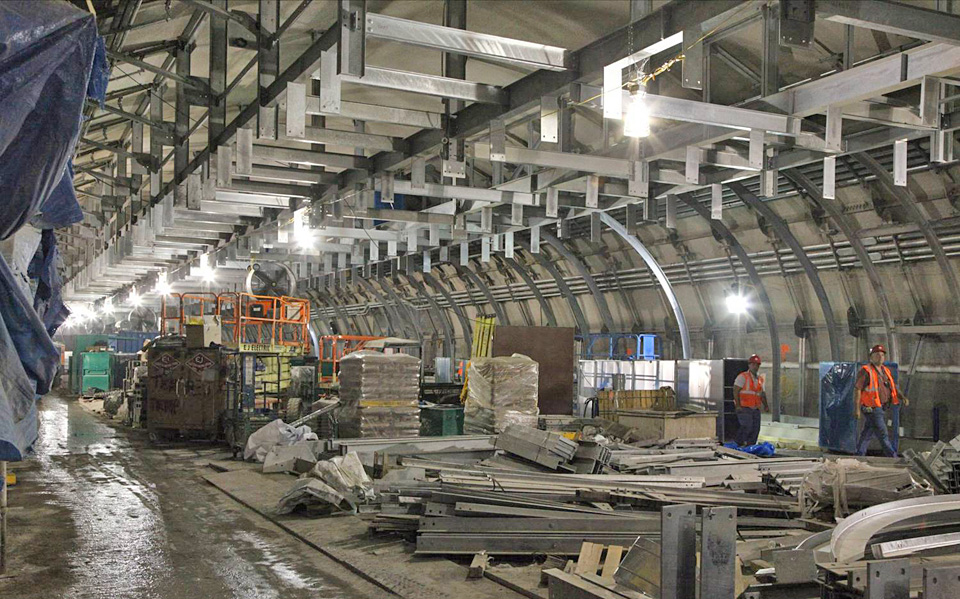
Tunnel progress in September 2012

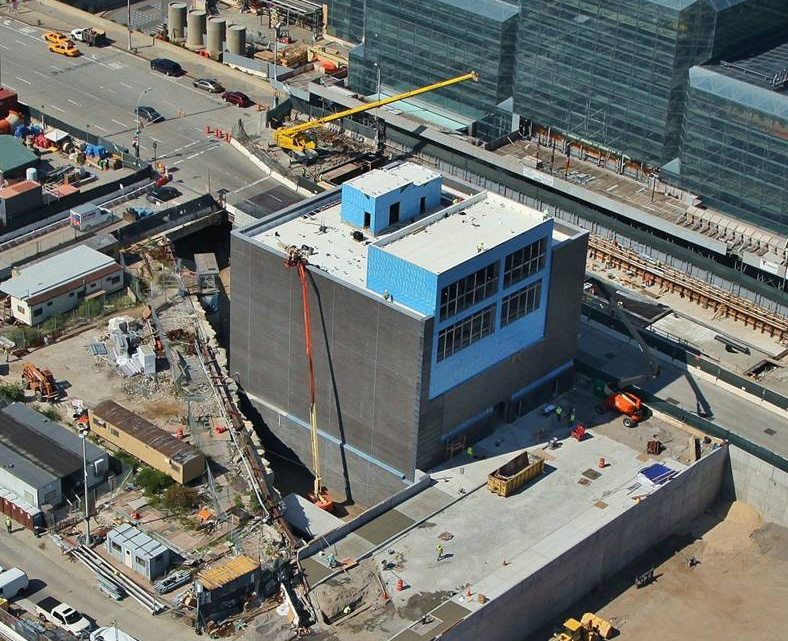
Ventilation structure at 11th Avenue and 36th Street, near construction site K

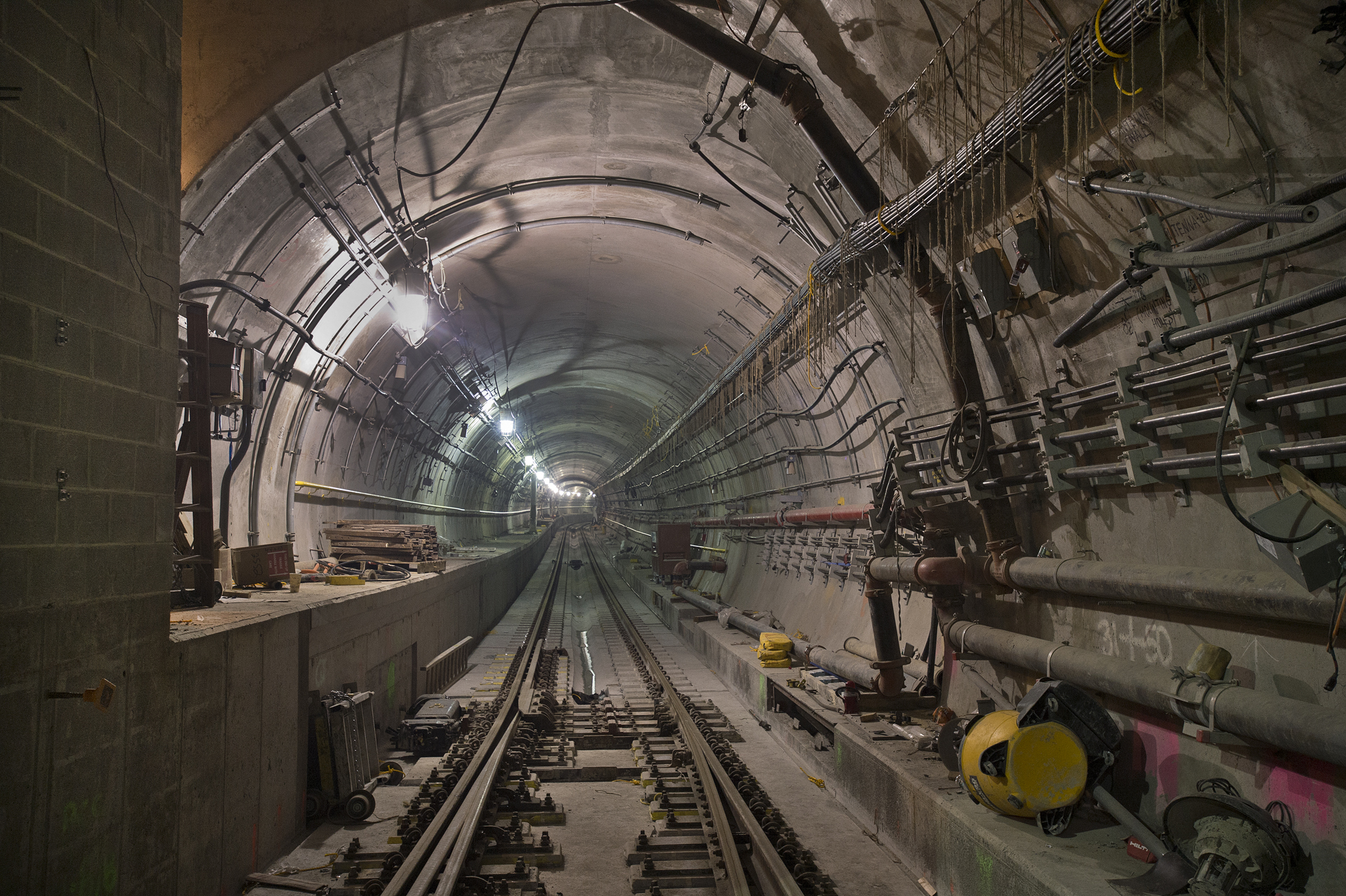
Tunnel on the 7 Subway Extension, under construction

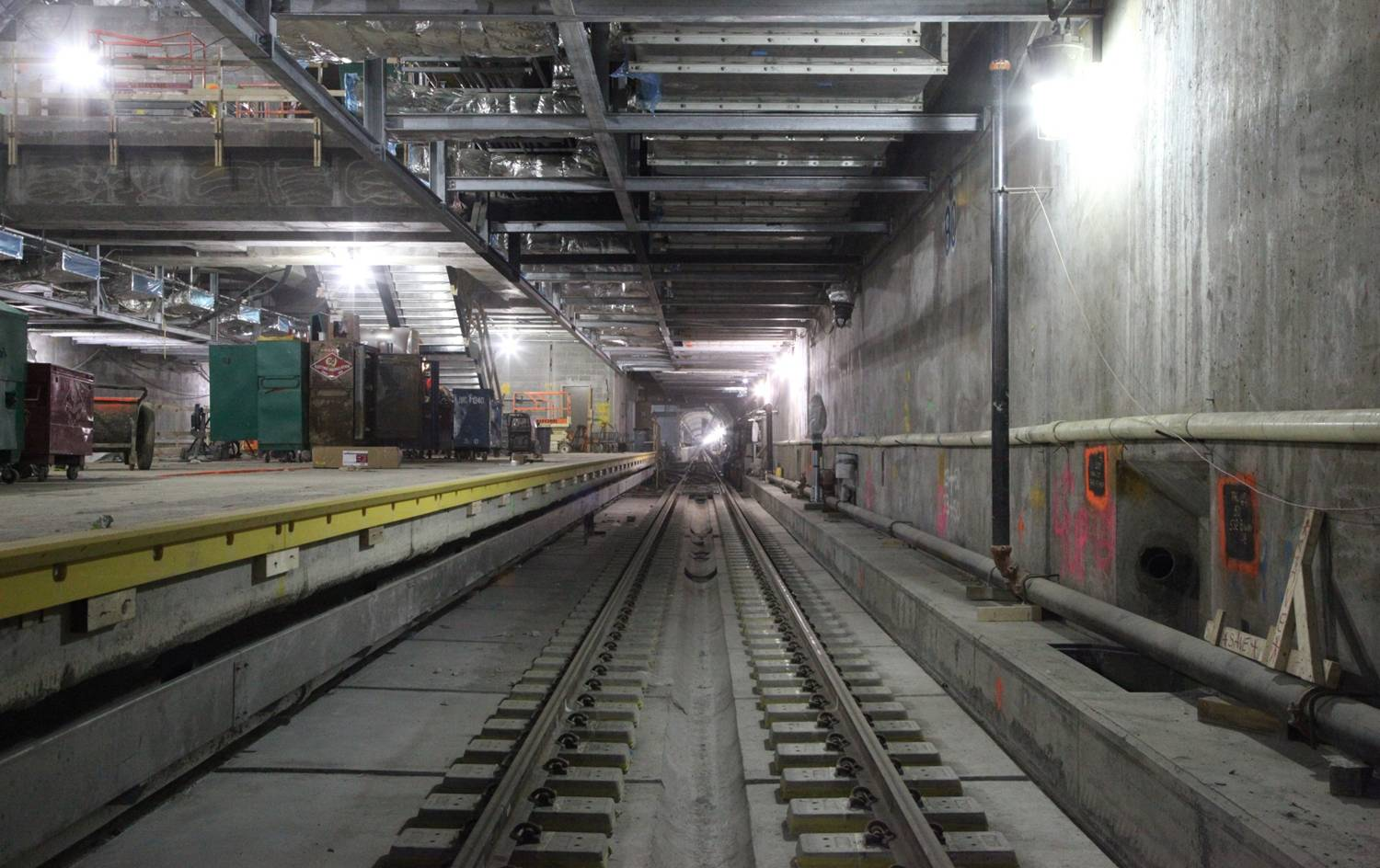
Tracks in the station, April 2013

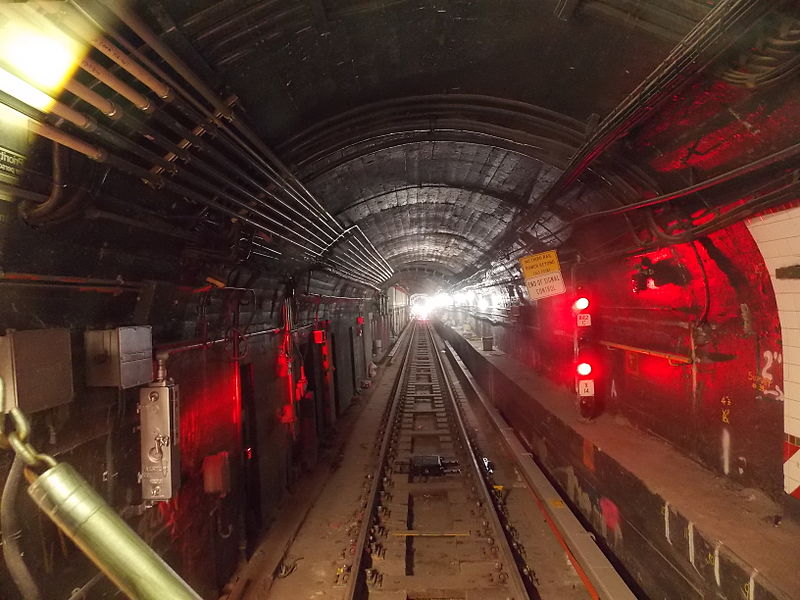
Extension, as viewed from Times Square on November 25, 2013. The fake wall has been removed

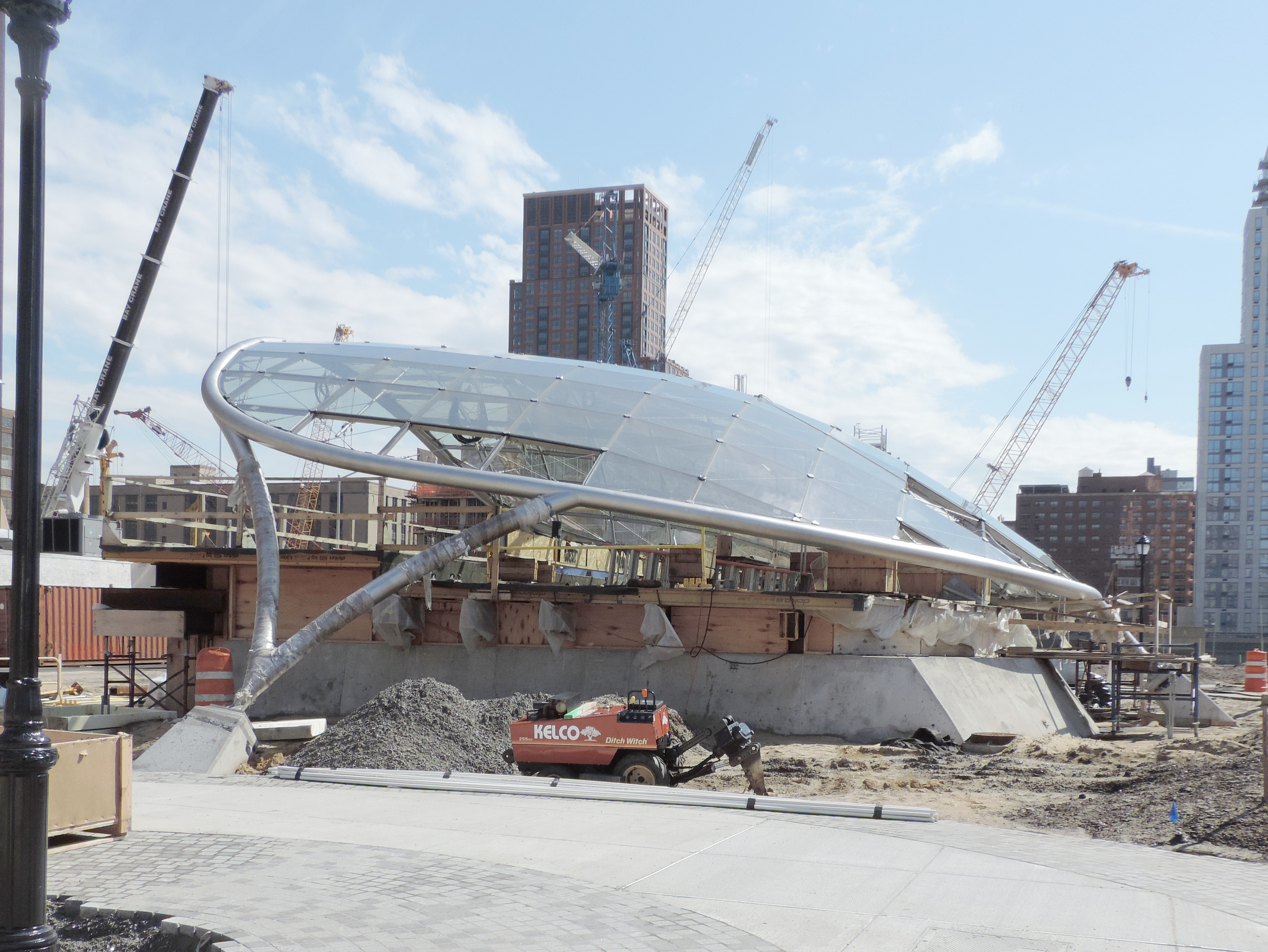
Station entrance under construction in May 2014

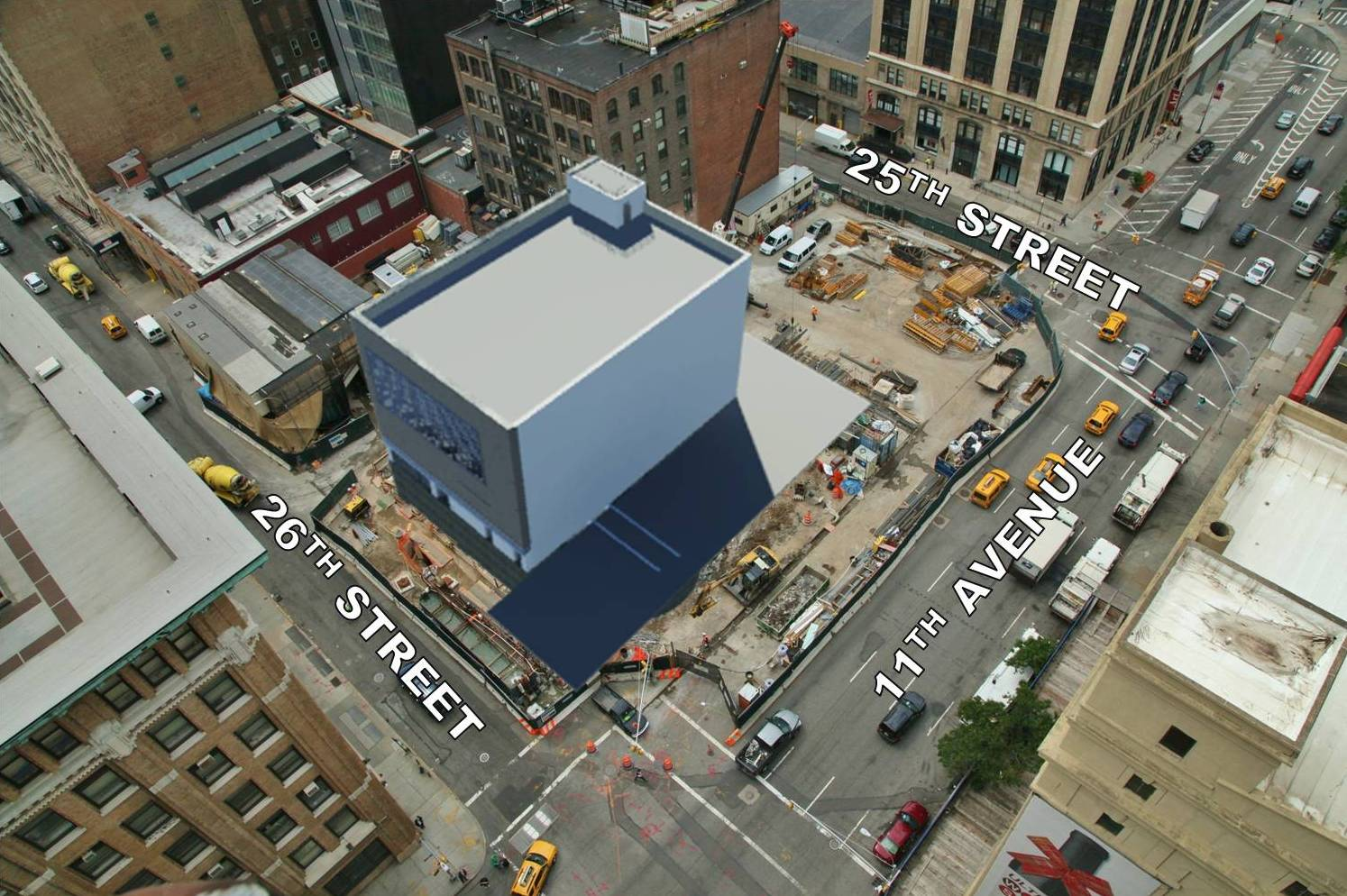
Rendering of Site A building between 25th and 26th Street, June 2013

== Construction areas ==
=== 34th Street–Hudson Yards station ===
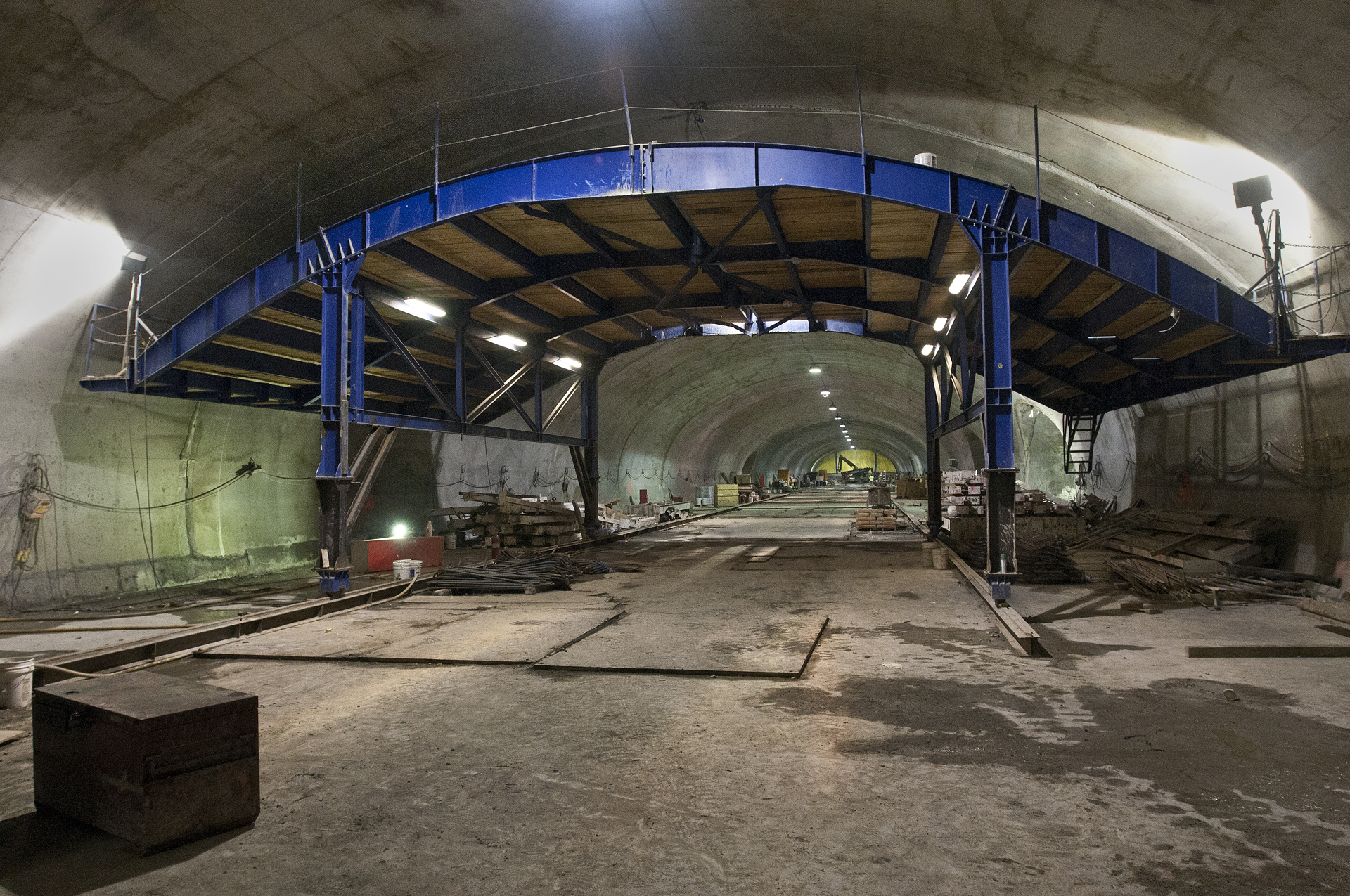
Progress on constructing the 34th Street–Hudson Yards station mezzanine as of June 2011

The 34th Street–Hudson Yards station is under the intersection of 11th Avenue and 34th Street. It is the only station on the extension, and opened on September 13, 2015. The MTA says that the new station will "make it possible for new housing, restaurants and entertainment to grow" in the surrounding neighborhoods, including Hell's Kitchen and Chelsea. The station is also close to the Jacob K. Javits Convention Center.

Passenger access to the station includes a pair of incline elevators. The project had been plagued by delays because of the mishaps involved in the installation of the custom-made elevators. In June 2012, the extension's opening was delayed to June 2014, with the rest of the 34th Street–Hudson Yards station to open at the end of 2015; by December 15, 2014, the opening date had been changed to mid-2015. In April 2014, the first of the 170-foot-long (52 m) incline elevators was installed in the station. The 80-foot (24 m) high incline elevators are the first of their kind in the system. The station is the third station in the New York City Subway to have low vibration tracks installed. These tracks provide a smoother, quieter ride for passengers, and eliminate the need for wooden track blocks.

=== Above-ground structures ===
The extension contains five street-level structures:

- Site A, a ventilation building at 11th Avenue between 25th and 26th Streets
- Site J, a ventilation building at 11th Avenue between 33rd and 34th Streets next to the main entrance and elevator entrance, which was originally a free-standing structure and subsequently incorporated into 55 Hudson Yards.
- Site K, a ventilation building at 11th Avenue between 35th and 37th Streets
- Site L, a ventilation building at 41st Street and Dyer Avenue
- Site P, the secondary station entrance between 11th Avenue between 34th and 35th Streets

== Proposals ==
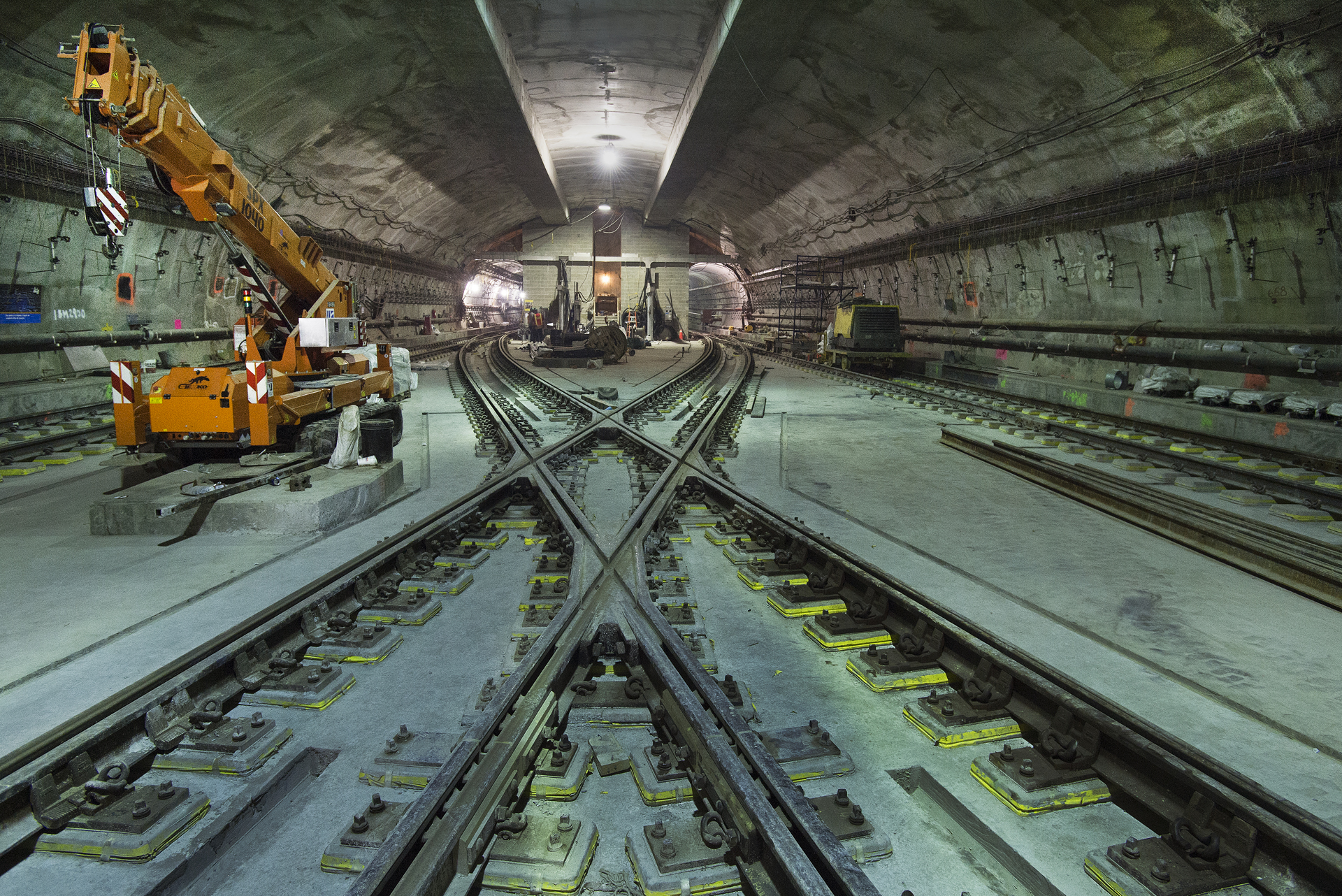
The diamond crossover north of 34th Street

=== 10th Avenue station ===
Although a new station at 10th Avenue and 41st Street was part of the original plan, the intermediate station was eliminated in October 2007 due to cost overruns, leaving the terminal station at Eleventh Avenue and 34th Street as the only new station on the extension. The MTA indicated that the 10th Avenue station could be included in the project if funding were found. The station was not included in the original (2007) contract award, but was listed as a $450 million option. In late December 2007, reports indicated that the postponed station might be partially built if the City of New York and the MTA agreed on the additional financing for the station shell. In February 2009, the MTA announced that it would build the station if the agency received sufficient funds from the federal economic stimulus package. In June 2010, the city announced it was seeking funding to assess the feasibility of constructing the station at a later date using a two-platform, two-entrance model without an underground connecting passage.

Construction of the line proceeded to its completion in 2014 without the station or its shell. In January 2016, the New York City Economic Development Corporation released a request for proposal (RFP) for a site of a proposed development at 41st Street and Tenth Avenue, including a study into the 10th Avenue station's feasibility. The new station was projected to cost $1 billion at the time. New York City Council candidate Erik Bottcher proposed completing the station in mid-2021, and elected officials again pushed for the station's construction in August 2022. By 2023, the MTA predicted that the station could cost $1.9 billion.

=== Extensions to New Jersey ===
In 2010, The New York Times reported that Mayor Michael Bloomberg's administration had been considering an extension to Hoboken and Secaucus Junction in New Jersey, allowing commuters from that state to more easily access Grand Central Terminal and other subway routes. If opened, the extension would take the New York City Subway outside the borders of both New York City and New York state for the first time. The planned extension would have cost less than the canceled Access to the Region's Core project, but travel times would be longer than the ARC project. The project, which could require five additional years to develop, would not be automatically entitled to the federal funding allotted to the ARC tunnel.

On February 2, 2011, the city's Economic Development Corporation voted to budget up to $250,000 for a feasibility study of the proposed New Jersey extension, carried out by engineering firm Parsons Brinckerhoff. Amtrak's February 2011 announcement of the Gateway Project, which entailed two new commuter rail tunnels under the Hudson River, included a proposal to extend the 7 service three blocks east of Eleventh Avenue to New York Penn Station, instead of five miles west to Secaucus. Congress allocated $15 million for studies for the project in November 2011, with the likelihood that Gateway and the subway extension would be in competition for funding. In April 2012, citing budget considerations, the director of the MTA, Joe Lhota, said that it was doubtful the extension would be built in the foreseeable future. After the Parsons Brinckerhoff feasibility study was released in April 2013, Bloomberg said: "Extending the 7 train to Secaucus is a promising potential solution ... and is deserving of serious consideration." In November 2013, the New Jersey Assembly passed Resolution 168 supporting the extension of the line to Hoboken and Secaucus.

In 2017, a further extension of the 7 train to New Jersey was suggested once again, this time as an alternative to constructing a replacement for the Port Authority Bus Terminal. An alternative would include a new terminal at Secaucus Junction in connection with the 7 extension. In February 2018, it was revealed that the Port Authority had advertised for consultants to write an 18-month feasibility study for such an extension, and that it had received bids from several companies. This extension was being planned along with the Gateway Project and, if built, would be able to accommodate a projected 38% increase in the number of people commuting between the two states. If the New Jersey subway extension were constructed, it could complement the Gateway Project, which was predicted to become overcrowded by 2040. At the time, the Port Authority was upgrading the PATH system, the only rapid transit link between New York and New Jersey, to accommodate more frequent trains.

=== Extension to 14th Street ===
The Regional Plan Association, in its Fourth Plan in 2017, proposed extending the 7 subway down the tail tracks and the Hudson waterfront to a new station at 14th Street and Tenth Avenue, with an intermediate stop at 23rd Street and Eleventh Avenue. If constructed, the new Tenth Avenue station would feature a pedestrian connection to the 14th Street/Eighth Avenue station, with transfers to the A, C, E, and L trains, and the tunnel would be configured to allow for a New Jersey extension.

== Awards and innovations ==
The New York State Society of Professional Engineers awarded the first construction phase, "Running Tunnels and Underground Structures," its 2013 Construction Project of the Year. According to the society, the project team won the award "for outstanding professional engineering efforts in developing creative solutions and innovative technologies in construction of an infrastructure project. The No. 7 project used the first double-shielded tunnel boring machines (TBMs) to tunnel under New York City while placing precast concrete segments to form the tunnels' walls. For the first time in the history of global subway systems, a ground freezing method was used to harden soil to act as rock to allow TBMs to maintain proper course while boring and placing the tunnel liners." While the extension extends 1 mile (1.6 km), the tunnels are actually 1.5 miles (2.4 km) long.

== See also ==
- East Side Access (LIRR)
- Gateway Project (Amtrak)
- Lower Manhattan–Jamaica/JFK Transportation Project (AirTrain JFK/LIRR)
- Second Avenue Subway – Another expansion of the New York City Subway system
