= 10th Avenue station (IRT Flushing Line) =

10 Avenue
- Planned New York City Subway station
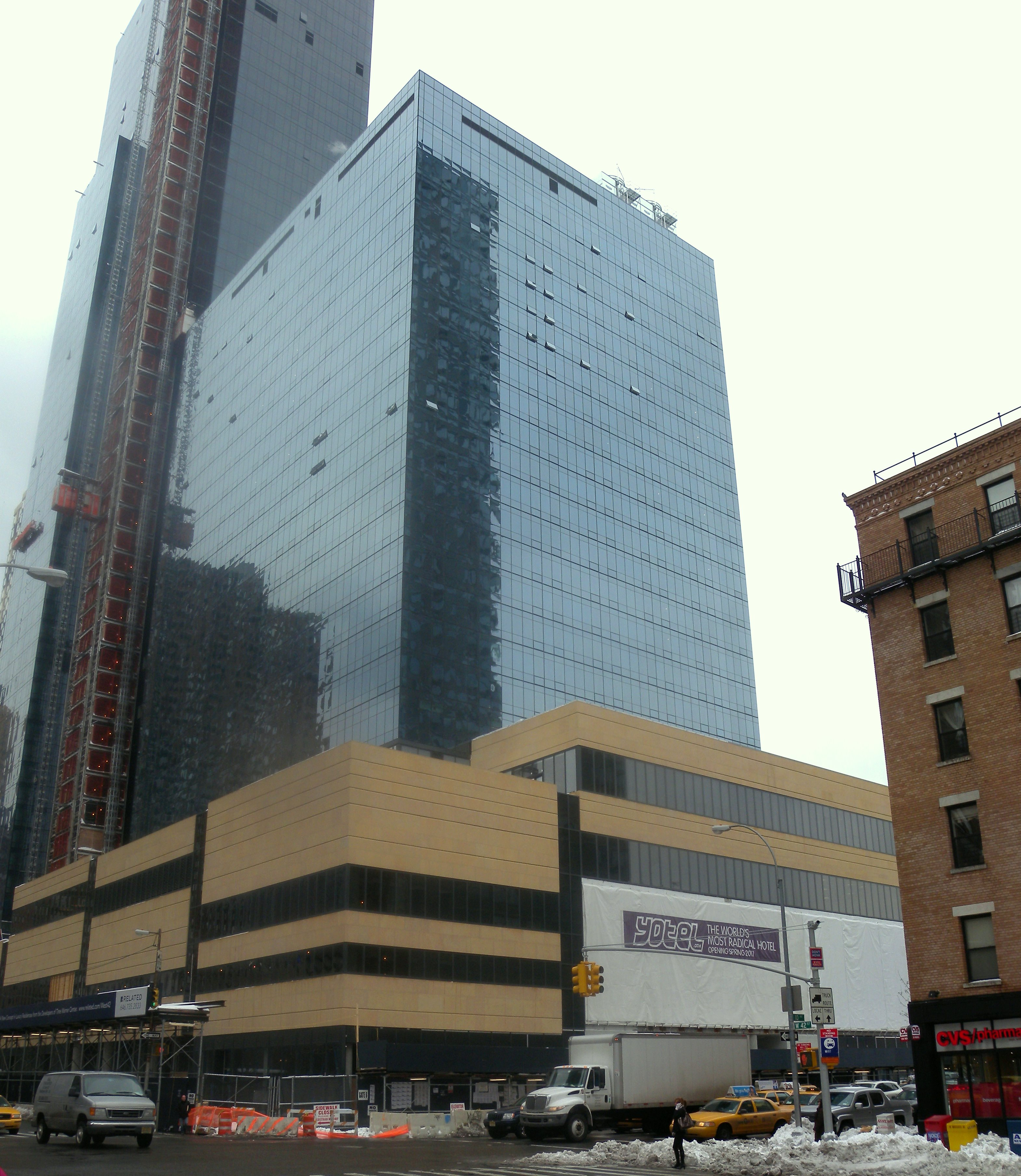
- The Yotel and MiMA at 42nd Street, near the location of one of the planned station's proposed entrances

Station statistics
- Address: 41st Street & 10th Avenue; New York, NY 10036
- Borough: Manhattan
- Locale: Hell's Kitchen
- Coordinates: 40.759°N 73.996°W
- Division: A (IRT)
- Line: IRT Flushing Line
- Services: None; unbuilt
- Structure: Underground
- Tracks: 2

Other information
- Opened: Proposed

Traffic
- 2025
- Rank: out of 423
Location
Location within New York City Subway
Location within New York City
Location within New York
Street map
Station service legend
Symbol	Description
Stops all times	Stops in station at all times
Stops all times except late nights	Stops all times except late nights
Stops late nights only	Stops late nights only
Stops late nights and weekends	Stops late nights and weekends only
Stops weekdays during the day	Stops weekdays during the day
Stops weekends during the day	Stops weekends during the day
Stops all times except rush hours in the peak direction	Stops all times except rush hours in the peak direction
Stops all times except weekdays in the peak direction	Stops all times except weekdays in the peak direction
Stops daily except rush hours in the peak direction	Stops all times except nights and rush hours in the peak direction
Stops rush hours only	Stops rush hours only
Stops rush hours in the peak direction only	Stops rush hours in the peak direction only
Station closed	Station is closed
(Details about time periods)

10th Avenue is a proposed station, first planned as part of the 7 Subway Extension for the IRT Flushing Line (7 and <7> trains) of the New York City Subway. It would be located at 10th Avenue and 41st Street and have two tracks and two side platforms if built. Under the original 2007 plan, there would be one street-level entrance for each direction, and no crossovers or crossunders to allow free transfer between directions.

The station was not built due to a lack of funding, but it could be completed if funding became available to build it. Various development proposals since 2009 have included completion of the station.

== Initial plans ==
Construction of the station was planned as part of the Hudson Yards Redevelopment Project, and construction was deemed possible as demand in the area grew. It was originally planned to be constructed as part of the 7 Subway Extension. The station would originally have had two exits from the eastbound platform to 40th Street—one at Hudson Boulevard and one east of 10th Avenue—and one from the westbound platform to 42nd Street east of 10th Avenue. Among the proponents is former deputy mayor Dan Doctoroff, who stated in 2015 that building the 10th Avenue station would boost development for decades.

A $450 million option to build a shell for the station was included as part of the October 2007 contract, requiring action by the city within nine months to have a shell built as part of the initial contract. Reports in late December 2007 indicated that the postponed station might be partially built, should the City of New York and the MTA come to terms on the additional financing for the station shell. As of October 2007, the city had no plans to fund the station; however, it could still be built if $550 million was raised privately to build the station. Construction of the station was estimated to have cost at least $450 million as of 2013.

In February 2009, the MTA announced that it would build the station if the agency received sufficient funds from the federal economic stimulus package. Otherwise, the station would be cut to keep costs under budget, as the 7 Subway Extension was already costing $2.4 billion.

Developers and local residents created a petition to construct the shell, fearing that the opportunity for a station would be lost once tunnel excavation was completed. In June 2010, the city announced it was seeking funding to assess the feasibility of constructing the station at a later date, using a two-platform, two-entrance model without an underground connecting passage. This type of station, while common in Manhattan, is not considered ideal by the MTA, but would nonetheless be acceptable were funding eventually found. The planned entrances would still be located two blocks apart due to the location's depth—with the westbound entrance on 42nd Street and the eastbound entrance on 40th Street—but the new plan only called for one exit in each direction. New York City Mayor Michael Bloomberg stated that he hoped that the station would be built in the future, with several others saying that building it would be "still possible".

== Further proposals ==
Construction of the line proceeded to its completion in 2014 without the station or its shell, which would have been between the Times Square and 34th Street–Hudson Yards stations. While no station infrastructure was constructed, a vent structure exists near the proposed location, and the tunnel levels out for a considerable length in the same general area. Building the "previously deferred No. 7 station at 10th Avenue" was a "key design element" of the proposed extension of the 7 service to Secaucus, New Jersey, but plans for that extension were later abandoned.

In January 2016, the New York City Economic Development Corporation released a request for proposal (RFP) for a site of a proposed development at 41st Street and Tenth Avenue. As part of that RFP, a study into the station's feasibility was to be conducted. The new station is projected to cost $1 billion, an increase from the previous estimate of $500 million. The new station could provide better access to a new Port Authority Bus Terminal if a connection was provided. In the Port Authority's 2016 design competition for a replacement Port Authority Bus Terminal west of Times Square, most of the announced finalists included the construction of, and direct access into, the Tenth Avenue station in their design plans.

In January 2021, developer Gotham Organization filed permits for a 47-story skyscraper to be built at 41st Street and 10th Avenue, near where the station's entrance would have been. The 2016 RFP for the station had been conducted for that skyscraper's construction. That June, New York City Council candidate Erik Bottcher proposed completing the station during his candidacy. Elected officials again pushed for the station's construction in August 2022. The MTA's 20-year needs assessment, released in October 2023, included a possible new station at 10th Avenue; by then, the MTA predicted that the station could cost $1.9 billion. In the assessment, the MTA said: "This project has a high cost in relation to the benefits that it provides. While it would shorten travel times slightly for a small number of new riders, it would add travel time for existing riders to or from 34th St."
