= 42nd Street–Port Authority Bus Terminal station =

New York City Subway station in Manhattan

42nd Street– Port Authority Bus Terminal
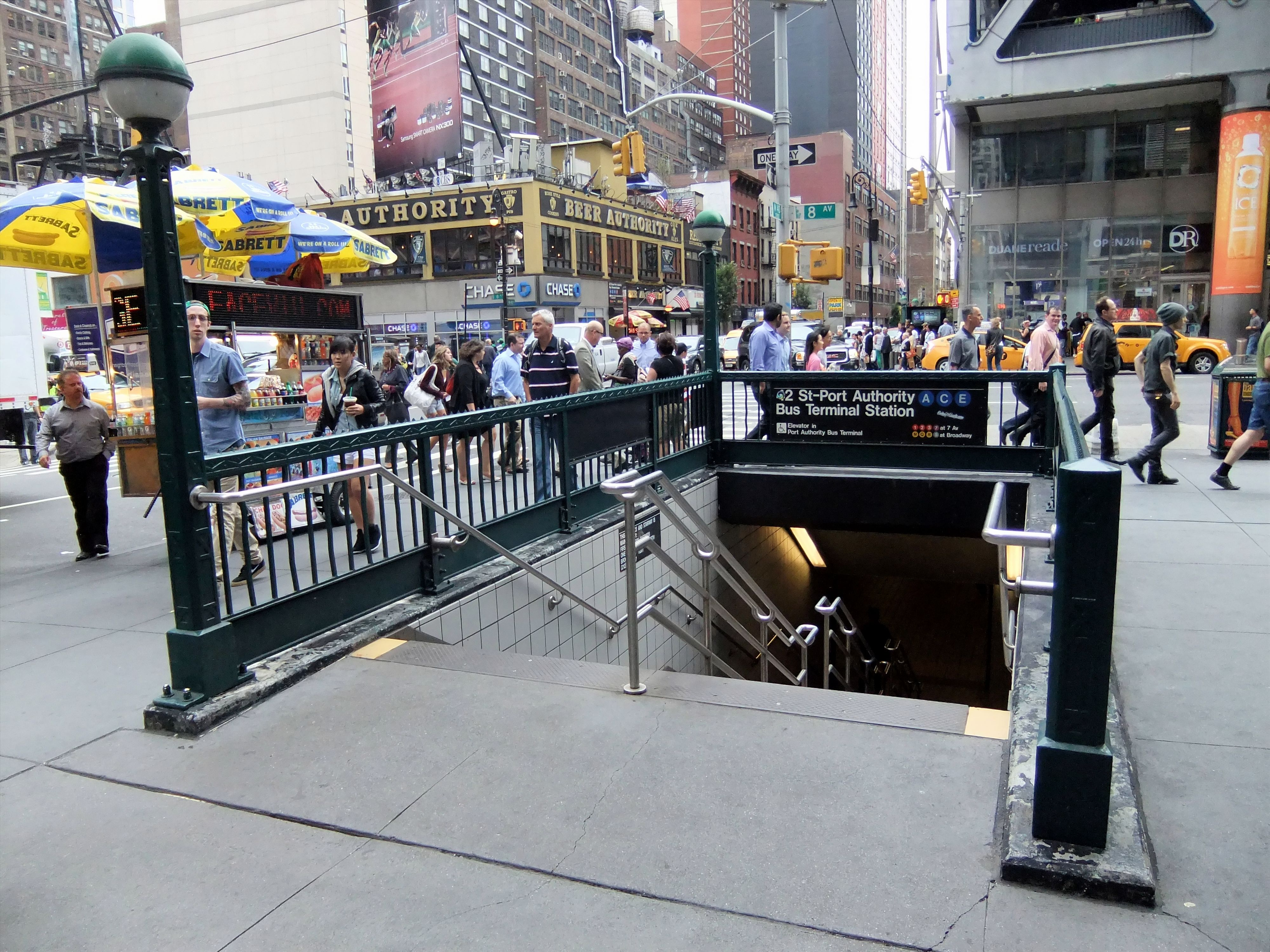
- Southeastern stair

Station statistics
- Address: West 42nd Street & Eighth Avenue; New York, New York
- Coordinates: 40.757205°N 73.98983°W
- Division: B (IND)
- Line: IND Eighth Avenue Line
- Services: A (all times); C (all except late nights); E (all times)
- System transfers: At Times Square–42nd Street: 1 (all times); 2 (all times); 3 (all times); 7 (all times) <7> (rush hours until 9:30 p.m., peak direction); N (all times); Q (all times); R (all except late nights); W (weekdays only); S (all except late nights)
- Transit: NYCT Bus: M7, M20, M34A SBS, M42, M104, SIM8, SIM22, SIM25, SIM26, SIM30; MTA Bus: BxM2 Port Authority Bus Terminal New Jersey Transit Bus: 101, 102, 105, 107, 108, 109, 111, 112, 113, 114, 115, 116, 117, 119, 121, 122, 123, 124, 125, 126, 127, 128, 129, 130, 131, 132, 133, 135, 136, 137, 138, 139, 144, 145, 148, 151, 153, 154, 155, 156, 157, 158, 159, 160, 161, 162, 163, 164, 165, 166, 167, 168, 177, 190, 191, 192, 193, 194, 195, 196, 197, 198, 199, 319, 320, 321, 324, 355
- Structure: Underground
- Levels: 2 (lower level abandoned)
- Platforms: 2 island platforms cross-platform interchange (upper level); 1 abandoned side platform (lower level)
- Tracks: 4 (upper level); 1 (lower level)

Other information
- Opened: September 10, 1932; 94 years ago (upper level); August 25, 1952; 74 years ago (lower level)
- Closed: 1981 (lower level)
- Accessible: Yes (passageway to Times Square–42nd Street not accessible)

Traffic
- 2025: 61,203,303 (Note: Ridership data includes Times Square–42nd Street station, 42nd Street–Port Authority Bus Terminal station, and 42nd Street–Bryant Park/Fifth Avenue station) ▲6.4%
- Rank: 1 out of 423
Services
| Preceding station | New York City Subway | Following station |
|---|---|---|
| 59th Street–Columbus Circle A toward Inwood–207th Street | Express | 34th Street–Penn Station A C E southbound |
| 50th Street A C E services split | Local | 34th Street–Penn Station A C E southbound |
Location
Location within New York City Subway
Location within New York City
Location within New York
Track layout
Upper level
Former lower level
Street map
Station service legend
| Symbol | Description |
| Stops all times | Stops in station at all times |
| Stops all times except late nights | Stops all times except late nights |
| Stops late nights only | Stops late nights only |
| Stops late nights and weekends | Stops late nights and weekends only |
| Stops weekdays during the day | Stops weekdays during the day |
| Stops weekends during the day | Stops weekends during the day |
| Stops all times except rush hours in the peak direction | Stops all times except rush hours in the peak direction |
| Stops all times except weekdays in the peak direction | Stops all times except weekdays in the peak direction |
| Stops daily except rush hours in the peak direction | Stops all times except nights and rush hours in the peak direction |
| Stops rush hours only | Stops rush hours only |
| Stops rush hours in the peak direction only | Stops rush hours in the peak direction only |
| Station closed | Station is closed |
(Details about time periods)

The 42nd Street–Port Authority Bus Terminal station is an express station on the IND Eighth Avenue Line of the New York City Subway. Located at the intersection of 42nd Street and Eighth Avenue in Manhattan, it is served by the A and E trains at all times, and by the C train at all times except late nights. Passageways connect this station to the nearby station at Times Square–42nd Street, providing a free transfer, and to the Port Authority Bus Terminal.

The 42nd Street station was built as an express station for the Independent Subway System (IND)'s Eighth Avenue Line. The station opened on September 9, 1932, as part of the initial section of the Eighth Avenue Line. The connection to the Port Authority Bus Terminal opened in 1950, and a platform on a lower level operated intermittently between 1952 and 1981. A free transfer to the Times Square station opened in 1988.

The station has two offset island platforms and four tracks, as well as a mezzanine leading from 40th to 42nd Streets. There was originally a lower level with one track and one side platform that served southbound trains from the Queens Boulevard Line. The station is compliant with the Americans with Disabilities Act of 1990, but the passageway to the Times Square–42nd Street complex is not accessible. The Times Square/Port Authority stations comprise the busiest station complex in the system, serving 65,020,294 passengers in 2019.

== History ==
=== Planning and construction ===
As early as March 1918, soon after the Brooklyn–Manhattan Transit Corporation (BMT)'s Broadway Line opened to Times Square–42nd Street, plans were being considered for an extension of that line beyond the stubs at 57th Street–Seventh Avenue to the Upper West Side and Washington Heights via Central Park West (Eighth Avenue). On August 3, 1923, the New York City Board of Estimate approved the Washington Heights Line, an extension of the Broadway Line to Washington Heights. The line was to have four tracks from Central Park West at 64th Street under Central Park West, Eighth Avenue, Saint Nicholas Avenue, and private property to 173rd Street, and two tracks under Fort Washington Avenue to 193rd Street. South of 64th Street, one two-track line would connect to the Broadway Line stubs at 57th Street, and another would continue under Eighth Avenue to 30th Street at Penn Station, with provisions to continue downtown.

Mayor John Hylan instead wanted to build an independent subway system, operated by the city. The New York City Board of Transportation (NYCBOT) gave preliminary approval to several lines in Manhattan, including one on Eighth Avenue, on December 9, 1924. The main portion of the already-approved Washington Heights Line—the mostly-four track line north of 64th Street—was included, but was to continue north from 193rd Street to 207th Street. South of 64th Street, the plan called for four tracks in Eighth Avenue, Greenwich Avenue, the planned extension of Sixth Avenue, and Church Street. Two tracks would turn east under Fulton Street or Wall Street and under the East River to Downtown Brooklyn. The BOT announced a list of stations on the new line in February 1928, with an express station at 40th Street.

A groundbreaking ceremony was held at St. Nicholas Avenue and 123rd Street on March 14, 1925. Most of the Eighth Avenue Line was dug using a cheap cut-and-cover method, where the street above was excavated. Still, the construction of the line was difficult, as it had to go under or over several subway lines. 42nd Street, the longest station along the line at 1,115 feet (340 m), was expected to be a major express station with large platforms, so the platforms were staggered away from each other in order to avoid going under property lines. The station's construction required over 4,000 short tons (3,600 long tons; 3,600 t) of structural steel and nearly 15,000 cubic feet (420 m^{3}) of concrete. Neighboring buildings, such as the Times Square Hotel and the Franklin Savings Bank at 42nd Street, had to be underpinned because the station extended all the way to the property line on either side. Several workers died in cave-ins during construction. The stations on the line were built with 600 feet (180 m) long platforms, but they had provisions to lengthen them to 660 feet (200 m) to accommodate eleven-car trains.

The IND's 42nd Street station was substantially completed by December 1930 except for some interior finishes. The entire line was completed by September 1931, except for the installation of turnstiles. The Eighth Avenue Line station opened on September 10, 1932, as part of the city-operated Independent Subway System (IND)'s initial segment, between Chambers Street and 207th Street. At the time of the IND Eighth Avenue Line's completion, the New York Herald Tribune referred to the line's 42nd Street station as the "largest platform in the world". The line's opening was expected to spur development around the intersection of 42nd Street and Eighth Avenue. The construction of the Eighth Avenue Line caused real-estate values along Eighth Avenue to increase by as much as 400 percent.

A pedestrian passageway under 41st Street, connecting the IND station at 42nd Street with the IRT and BMT stations at Times Square, opened on December 24, 1932; the passageway included an entrance on 41st Street between Seventh and Eighth Avenues. Passengers had to pay an additional fare to transfer to and from the IND.

=== Mid-20th century ===
With the construction of the Port Authority Bus Terminal, in September 1950, the Board of Transportation approved the construction of a 30-foot-wide (9.1 m) ramp between the Eighth Avenue Line station and the bus terminal for $100,000. The IND's lower level was built together with the upper-level platforms but existed as an unfinished shell. The city approved a $300,000 renovation of the lower level in June 1952, and the lower level opened on August 25, 1952, to serve rush hour E trains. For most of its existence, the lower-level platform was only used for occasional service specials, including summer "Rockaway Special" trains to Beach 98th Street at the Rockaways' Playland beginning in 1958, the Aqueduct Racetrack special fare trains from 1959 to 1981, and rush hour E trains in the 1970s, beginning on March 23, 1970.

By the 1970s, city officials planned to raise funds for a renovation of the Times Square station complex, using sales-tax revenue from materials used in the construction of the New York Marriott Marquis hotel. As part of a pilot program to reduce high crime in the New York City Subway system, in May 1981, the MTA spent $500,000 to install CCTV screens at the Columbus Circle subway station. The MTA expanded the experiment to the Times Square–42nd Street station in 1983. The cameras were deactivated in 1985 after further tests showed that their presence did not help reduce crime. The MTA considered transferring 220 CCTV cameras from these stations to token booths at the stations with the most crime. On August 1, 1988, the passageway between the IND Eighth Avenue Line station and the IRT/BMT complex was finally placed within fare control. The two previously separate stations had the highest crime rates in the system at the time.

=== Late 20th and early 21st centuries ===
Entrance

The Empire State Development Corporation (ESDC), an agency of the New York state government, had proposed redeveloping the area around a portion of West 42nd Street in 1981. As part of the redevelopment, in 1988, the state and NYCTA announced that they would spend $125 million on renovating the Times Square subway complex. The project would have included an underground rotunda with stores, connecting several office buildings; new subway entrances inside these buildings; and elevators. The project excluded renovation of the platforms or the passageway under 41st Street. Park Tower Realty, which had committed to developing four buildings in the redevelopment, would have paid for 60 percent of the project's cost, while the New York City Transit Authority would have provided $45 million and the city would have provided $10 million. The project was canceled in August 1992 after Prudential Insurance and Park Tower Realty was given permission to postpone the construction of these buildings.

The station underwent total reconstruction in three stages starting in 1994. The Eighth Avenue Line platforms were renovated as part of the second phase of the project, finished in 2006.

In the late 2000s, the MTA began construction on an extension of the IRT Flushing Line to 34th Street, which would require demolishing the IND Eighth Avenue lower level platform. By January 2010, the lower level platform was being demolished as part of the Flushing Line extension, which slopes down through where the old lower level platform was. On September 13, 2015, the Flushing Line was extended one stop west from Times Square to 34th Street–Hudson Yards. The Metropolitan Transportation Authority announced in 2024 that it would replace the station's existing waist-high turnstiles with taller, wide-aisle turnstiles. In April 2025, the MTA announced plans to install taller fare gates with glass panels at 20 stations, including the 42nd Street–Port Authority Bus Terminal station. The fare gates would be manufactured by Cubic Transportation Systems, Conduent, Scheidt & Bachmann, and STraffic as part of a pilot program to reduce fare evasion.

== Station layout ==
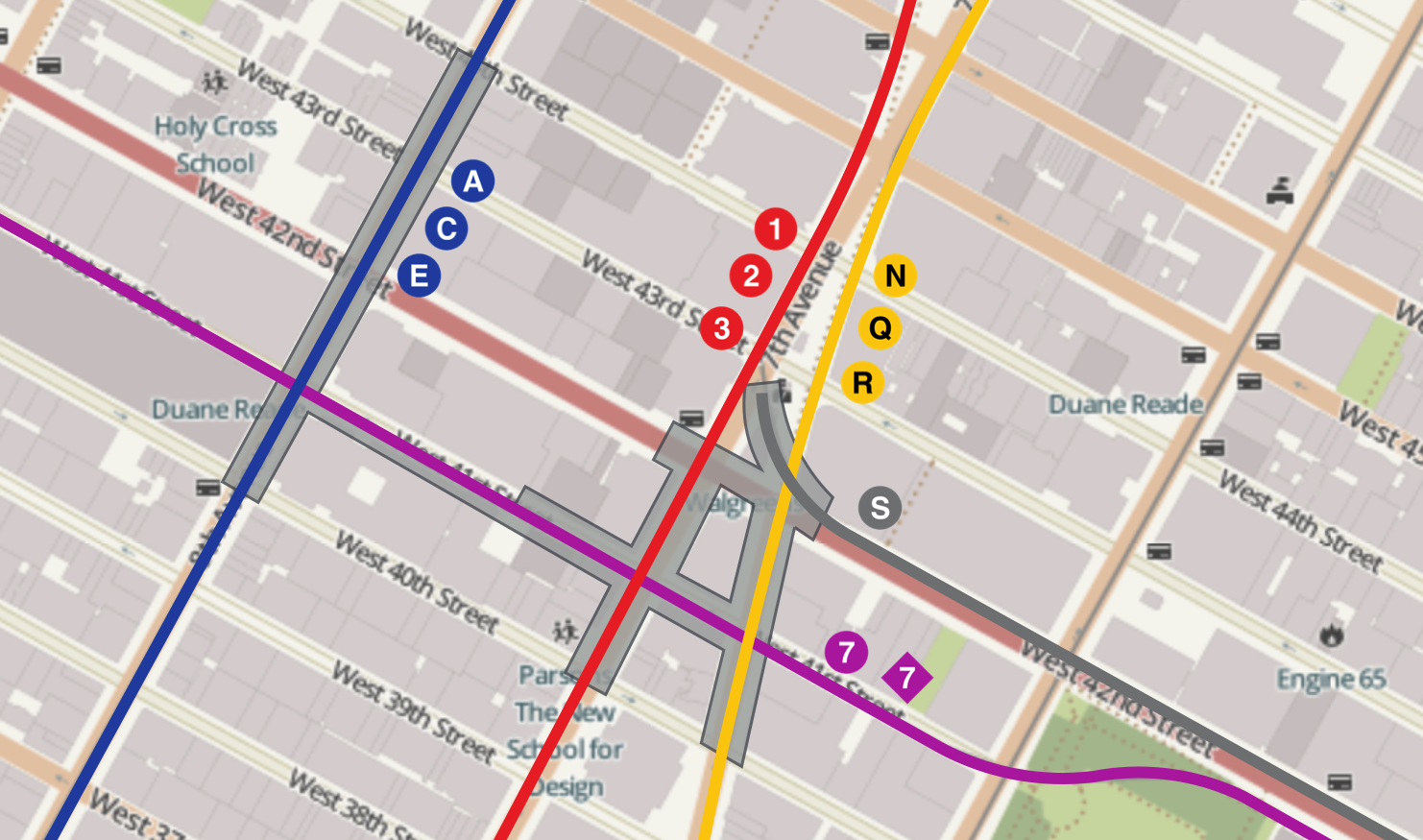
Physical locations of the platforms

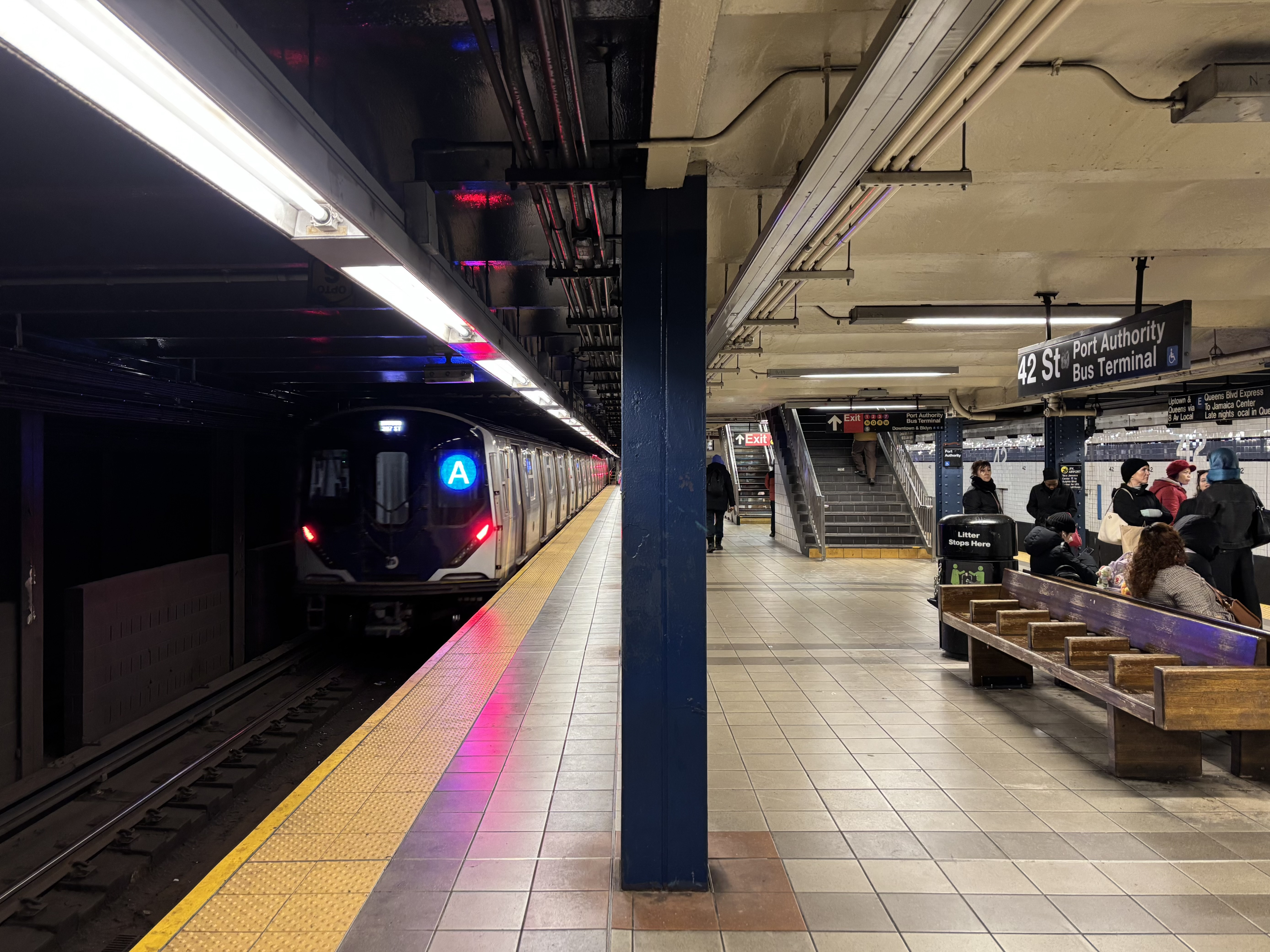
R211A A train departing from the northbound platform

The 42nd Street–Port Authority Bus Terminal station is an express stop that abuts the Port Authority Bus Terminal. The A and E trains stop here at all times, while the C train stops here except at night. The A runs on the express tracks during the day and on the local tracks during the night, while the C and E always run on the local tracks. The next stop to the north is 50th Street for local trains and 59th Street–Columbus Circle for express trains, while the next stop to the south is 34th Street–Penn Station for all service. It has one operational platform level, two offset island platforms, and a long mezzanine. Formerly, it also had a lower level with a single side platform, which could be served by southbound trains from the IND Queens Boulevard Line. The 42nd Street–Port Authority Bus Terminal station is fully wheelchair-accessible. A ramp connects to the Times Square–42nd Street station but is not accessible.

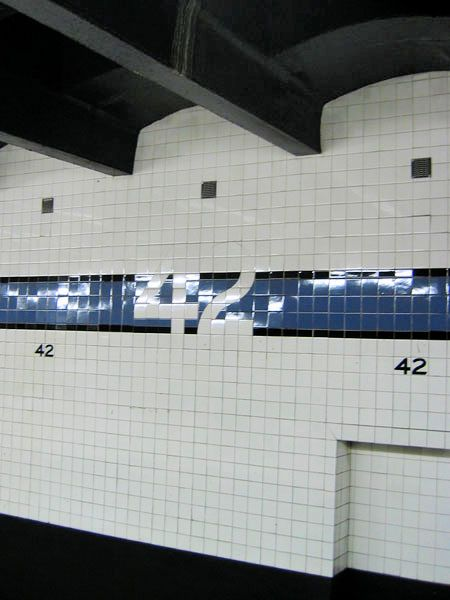
Wall mosaics

The station ranges up to 50 feet (15 m) below the street, running under Eighth Avenue in approximately a north–south direction, one block west of the Times Square–42nd Street station. Both island platforms were originally 600 feet (180 m) long, although the station served 660-foot-long (200 m), 11-car trains on the E route from 1953 to 1958. The northbound platform extends from 42nd to 44th Streets and is 30 feet (9.1 m) wide. The southbound island platform extends from 40th to 42nd Streets and is 36 feet (11 m) wide. Formerly, escalators led from the mezzanine to the southbound side platform on the lower level, dividing the southbound island platforms. At 41st Street, the station crosses over the IRT Flushing Line tunnels; this overpass required 217,000 pounds (98,000 kg) of steel.

The walls beside each local track contain blue-tile bands with black borders; since 42nd Street is an express station, it has a wider tile band than local stations. The tile colors are intended to help riders identify their station more easily, part of a color-coded tile system for the entire Independent Subway System. The tile colors were designed to facilitate navigation for travelers going away from Lower Manhattan; on the Eighth Avenue Line, the tiles change color at the next express station to the north. As such, the 42nd Street station originally had purple tiles, which were also used at 50th Street, the local station to the north; the next express station, 59th Street, used a different tile color.

=== Former lower level ===
The 42nd Street–Port Authority Bus Terminal station formerly had a lower platform level, with one track underneath the southbound local track and one side platform underneath the southbound island platform. The lower level featured two high-speed escalators to the mezzanine, and three staircases to the southbound island platform. The walls featured 1950s-era cream tiles, a purple and black tile band, and white mosaic name plates with black "42ND ST" text.

Theories differ on why the lower-level platform was built. The platform could only be reached by trains originating from Queens via the IND Queens Boulevard Line, and 53rd Street (the current E service), and a 1930 New York Times article said the platform had always been intended for Queens Boulevard Line service. Reportedly, this would have allowed E trains to load and unload passengers without having to wait for one of the two upper level tracks to clear. When the station was being built, the 42nd Street Property Owners' and Merchants' Association expressed concerns that the double-level station would prevent the Flushing Line from being extended westward. The New York Herald Tribune wrote in 1928: "The construction is such as will enable the engineers to extend the Queensboro subway under and beyond Eighth Avenue in the direction of the 42nd Street ferry if desired".

Film producers have used the lower-level platform for several films, most notably Ghost (1990), starring Patrick Swayze and Demi Moore. By the 2010s, the lower-level platform had been bisected by the extension of the Flushing Line.

=== Mezzanines ===
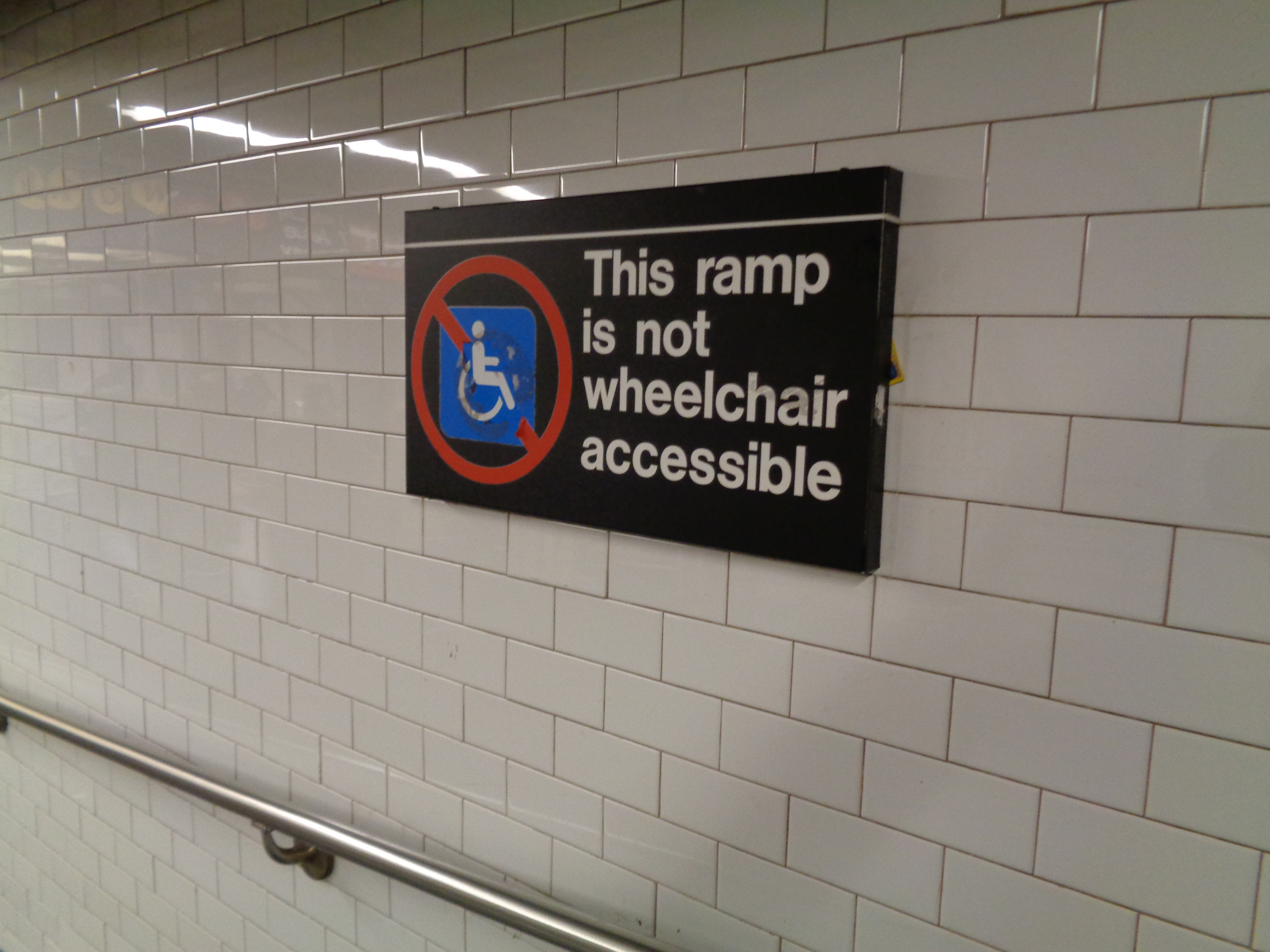
A sign at the western end of the passageway ramp, informing customers that the passageway to rest of the complex is not ADA-accessible

The IND mezzanine stretches above the platforms, under Eighth Avenue, from 40th to 44th Street. It covers 130,000 square feet (12,000 m^{2}). It was one of four large mezzanines at express stations on the Eighth Avenue Line where passengers could walk the entire length of the mezzanines without having to pay a fare. It was proposed to develop the mezzanines of these four stations with shops, so that they would become retail corridors. The station's mezzanine extends four blocks from 40th to 44th Streets. There were originally six stairs from the mezzanine to either of the IND's island platforms. The center of the mezzanine originally featured an 18-foot-wide (5.5 m) public passageway outside fare control. Between 44th and 42nd Streets, the passageway was flanked by stores on the west and stairs to the northbound platform on the east. Between 42nd and 40th Streets, the stairs to the southbound island platform were on the west, while there were stores to the east.

A 600-foot-long (180 m) passageway runs under 41st Street and connects the IND station with the Times Square complex. The passageway is located above the mezzanines at either end. It is stair-free but contains steep ramps at both ends, which are not ADA-compliant. At the eastern end of the passageway, the passageway connects to a mezzanine at the Times Square station, just above the IRT Flushing Line's platform.

=== Artwork ===
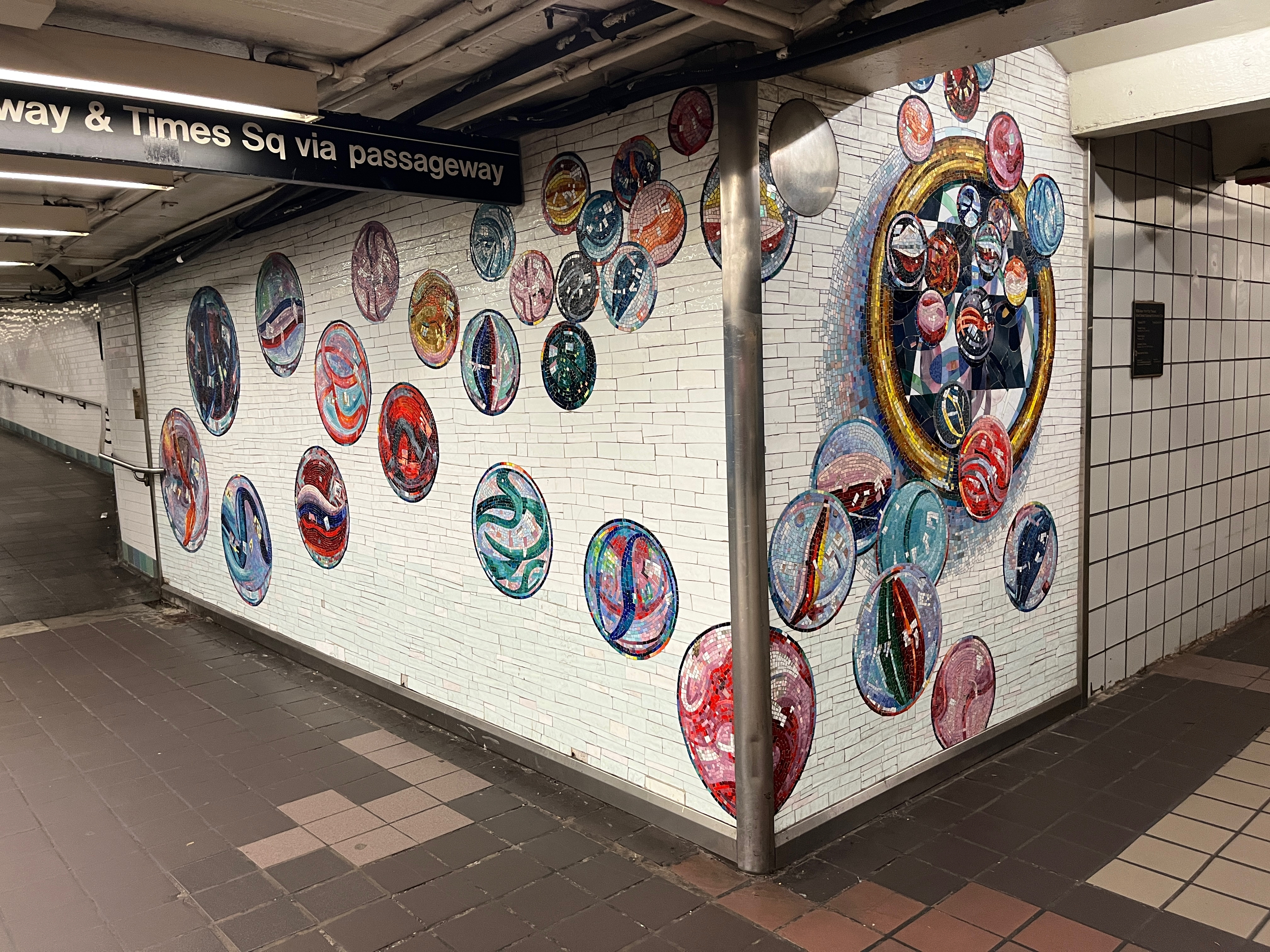
Losing My Marbles mosaic

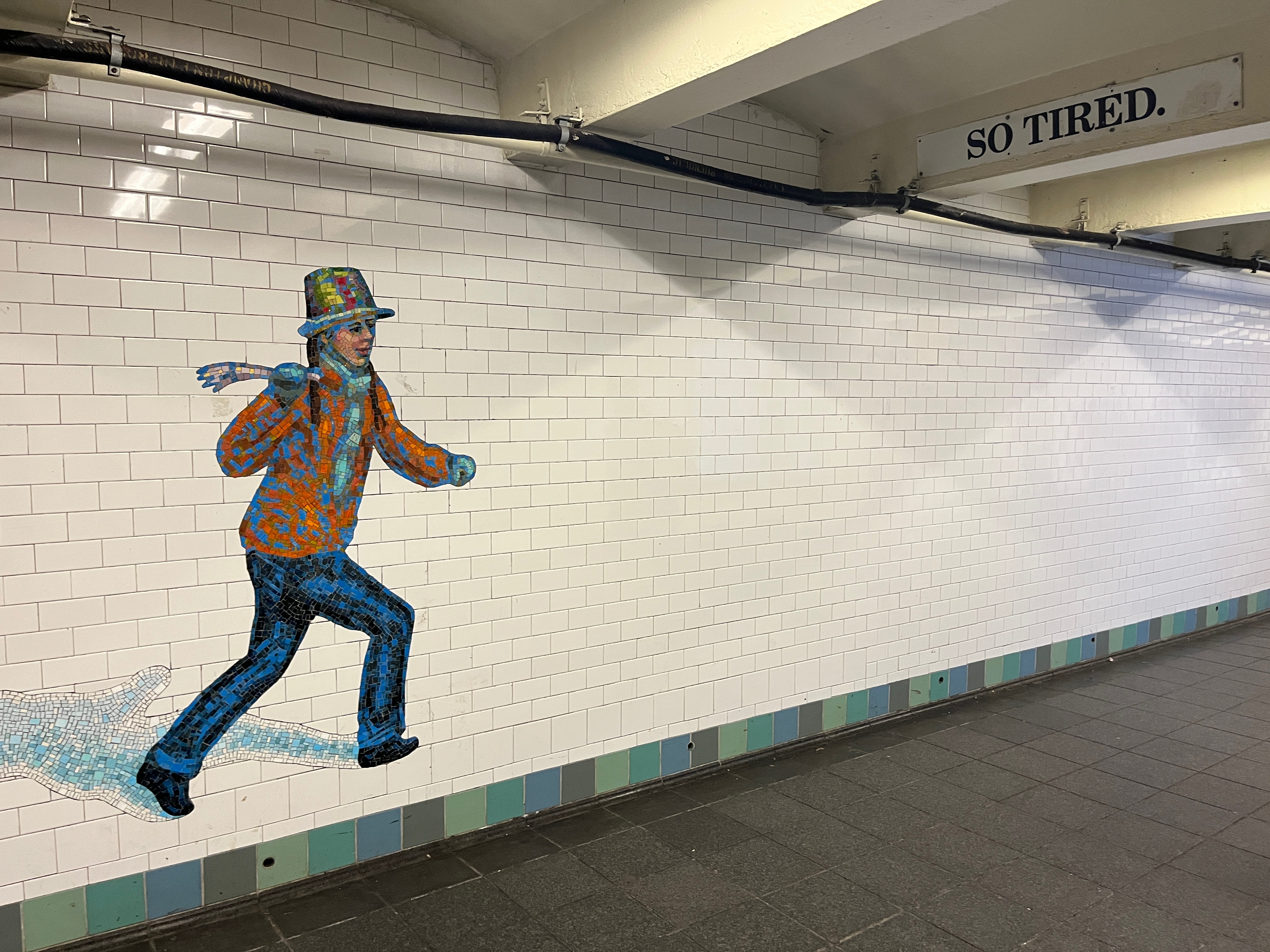
The Revelers and The Commuter's Lament

The Port Authority and Times Square stations contain several artworks commissioned as part of the MTA Arts & Design program. In 1991, Norman B. Colp created The Commuter's Lament or A Close Shave, a series of signs attached to the roof of the 41st Street passageway between Seventh and Eighth Avenues, inspired by classic Burma-Shave ads. In order, the signs read Overslept/So tired/If late/Get fired/Why bother?/Why the pain?/Just go home/Do it again. The last panel is a picture of a bed. The panels were part of an art project that was supposed to last only one year, but were never removed. The mezzanine also contains a mosaic artwork by Jane Dickson, Revelers. The mosaics depict about 70 life-size people who are moving around in groups.

The 42nd Street–Port Authority Bus Terminal station contains the mosaic artwork Losing My Marbles, which was created by Lisa Dinhofer and installed in 2003. The primary section of the artwork is on a 32-foot-wide (9.8 m) portion of wall, which depicts marbles overlaid on a black-and-white "floor" with a gold-colored frame; the marbles seem to be rolling in the viewer's direction. The artwork extends onto two additional walls.

=== Exits ===
There is one street stair to each of the northwest, northeast, and southeast corners of Eighth Avenue and 40th Street. There are two underground passageways to Port Authority Bus Terminal: one between 40th and 41st Streets, and a wheelchair accessible passageway between 41st and 42nd Streets. At the intersection of Eighth Avenue and 42nd Street, there is one street stair to the northwest corner, one stair inside a building on the northeast corner, and one escalator bank inside a building on the southeast corner. One street stair leads to the southwest corner of Eighth Avenue and 43rd Street. Finally, there is one street stair to each of the northwest, southwest, and southeast corners of Eighth Avenue and 44th Street. The southwest-corner entrance also has a wheelchair lift that leads to an elevator. All of these exits are signed as serving the A, C, E, and 7 trains.
