= List of tallest buildings in New York City =

Skyline of New York City
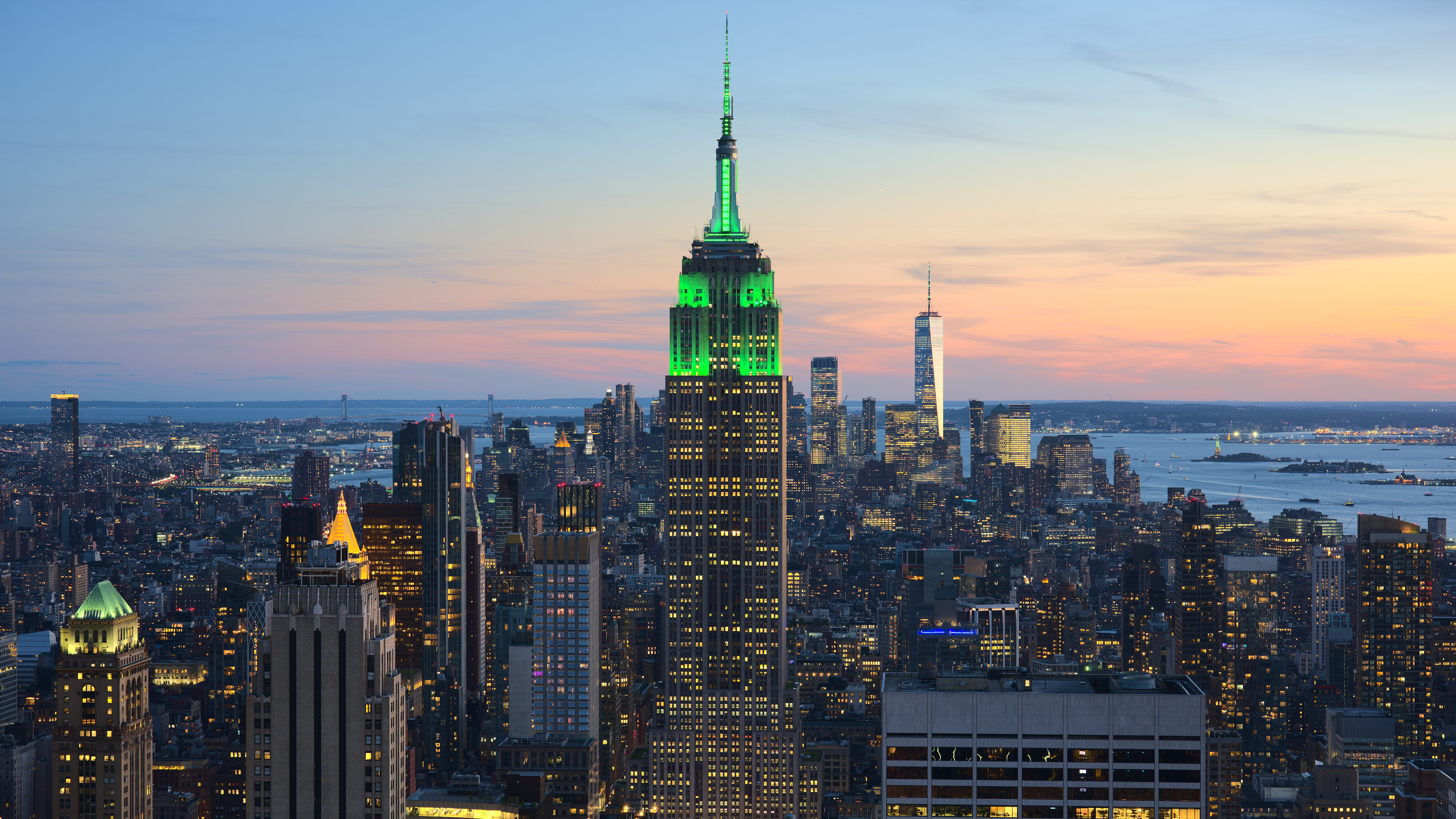
- Midtown Manhattan with the Empire State Building (center) and Lower Manhattan with One WTC (center-right)
- Tallest building: One World Trade Center (2014)
- Tallest building height: 1,776 ft (541 m)
- Major clusters: Midtown Manhattan; Lower Manhattan; Downtown Brooklyn; Long Island City
- First 150 m+ building: Singer Building (1898)

Number of tall buildings (2026)
- Taller than 100 m (328 ft): 884
- Taller than 150 m (492 ft): 325+6 T/O (Note: Topped-out)
- Taller than 200 m (656 ft): 103+3 T/O
- Taller than 300 m (984 ft): 19
- Taller than 400 m (1,312 ft): 6

Number of tall buildings — feet
- Taller than 300 ft (91.4 m): 1,072

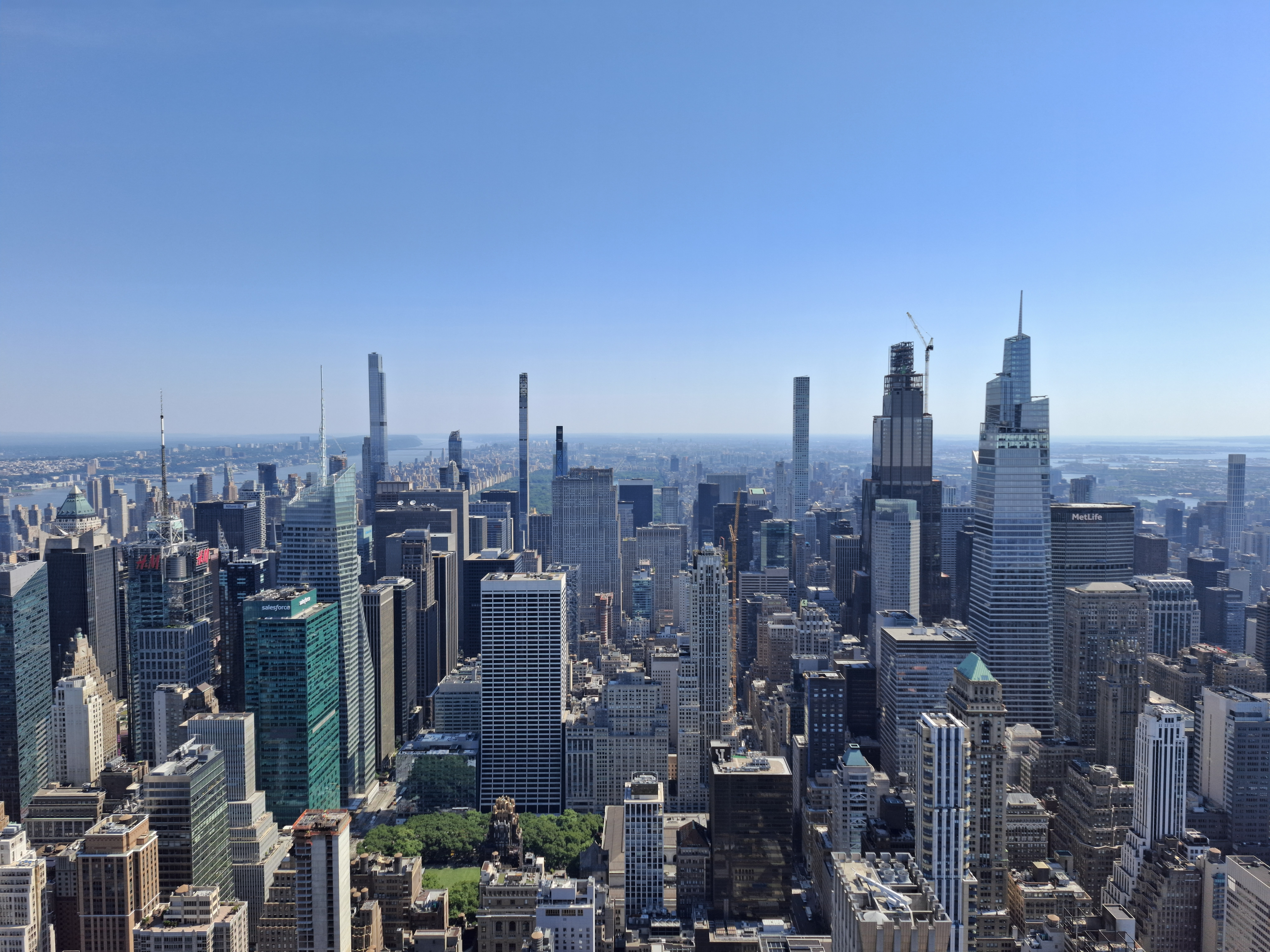
Midtown Manhattan in June 2024 looking north from the Empire State Building's 102nd floor (1,224 feet or 373 meters)

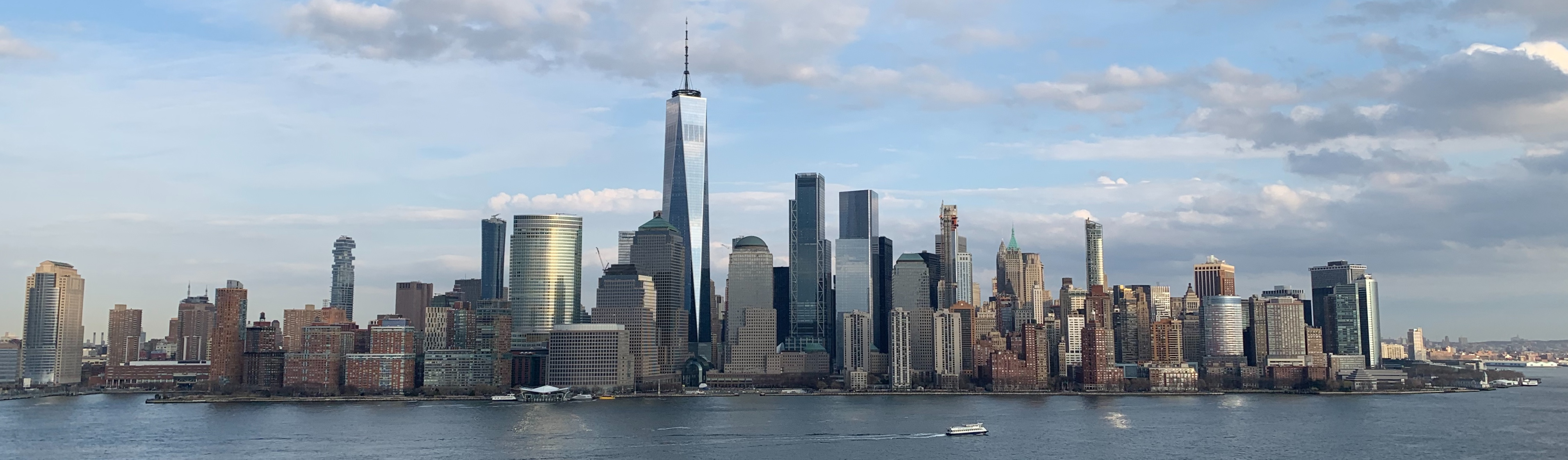
Lower Manhattan, viewed from Jersey City, New Jersey with the World Trade Center complex in the middle

New York City is the most populous city in the United States, with a metropolitan area population of over 20 million as of 2026. Its skyline is one of the largest in the world, and the largest in the United States, in North America, and in the Western Hemisphere. Throughout most of the 20th century, New York City's skyline was by far the largest in the world. New York City is home to more than 7,000 completed high-rise buildings of at least 115 feet (35 m), of which at least 106 are taller than 650 feet (198 m). The tallest building in New York is One World Trade Center, which rises 1,776 feet (541 m). The 104-story (Note: The building is 104 standard floors tall, and most references supply this figure. However, only 94 actual, physically usable stories are present; see the skyscraper's main article for more details.) skyscraper also stands as the tallest building in the United States, the tallest building in the Western Hemisphere, and the seventh-tallest building in the world.

The city is home to many of the earliest skyscrapers, which began to appear towards the end of the 19th century. A major construction surge in the 1920s saw the completion of some of the tallest skyscrapers in the world at the time, including the Chrysler Building in 1930 and the Empire State Building in 1931 in Midtown Manhattan. At 1,250 feet (381 m) and 102-stories, the Empire State Building stood as the tallest building in the world for almost four decades; it remains among the city's most recognizable skyscrapers today. Following a lull in skyscraper development during the 1930s to 1950s, construction steadily returned. The Empire State Building was dethroned as the world's tallest building in 1970, when the 1,368-foot (417 m) North Tower of the original World Trade Center surpassed it. The North Tower, along with its twin the South Tower, held this title only briefly as they were both surpassed by the Willis Tower (then Sears Tower) in Chicago in 1973. The Twin Towers remained the tallest buildings in New York City until they were destroyed in the September 11 attacks in 2001.

Starting from the mid-2000s, New York City would undergo an unprecedented skyscraper boom. The new One World Trade Center, part of the redevelopment of the World Trade Center, began construction in 2006 and was completed in 2014. It surpassed the Empire State Building as the city's tallest, and overtook the Willis Tower to become the tallest building in the United States. In Midtown Manhattan, a luxury residential boom led to the completion of Central Park Tower, the second-tallest building in the city at 1,550 feet (472 m), with the highest roof of any building outside Asia; 111 West 57th Street, the city's third-tallest building and the world's most slender skyscraper at 1,428 feet (435 m), and 432 Park Avenue, the city's fifth-tallest building at 1,397 feet (426 m). The tallest office skyscraper in Midtown, One Vanderbilt, is the fourth-tallest building in the city at 1,401 feet (427 m). The second tallest, 270 Park Avenue, opened in 2025 as the headquarters of JPMorgan Chase. The Hudson Yards redevelopment added over fifteen skyscrapers to Manhattan's West Side.

The majority of skyscrapers in New York City are concentrated in its two primary business districts, Midtown Manhattan and Lower Manhattan, with Midtown having more skyscrapers, including 15 of the city's 18 supertall skyscrapers when Hudson Yards is included. New York City has the third-most supertall skyscrapers in the world. Other neighborhoods of Manhattan and the boroughs of Brooklyn, Queens, and the Bronx are also home to a substantial number of high-rises. A popular misconception holds that the relative lack of skyscrapers between Lower and Midtown Manhattan is due to the depth of the bedrock beneath the two areas. Since the 2010s, an increasing number of skyscrapers have been built in Downtown Brooklyn and Long Island City, as well as along the East River in Brooklyn and Queens.

== History ==
Number of skyscrapers by height in New York City at the end of each year, including skyscrapers under construction expected to be completed in 2025. Click on the legend to toggle a specific height on or off. View chart definition.

=== Early skyscrapers ===
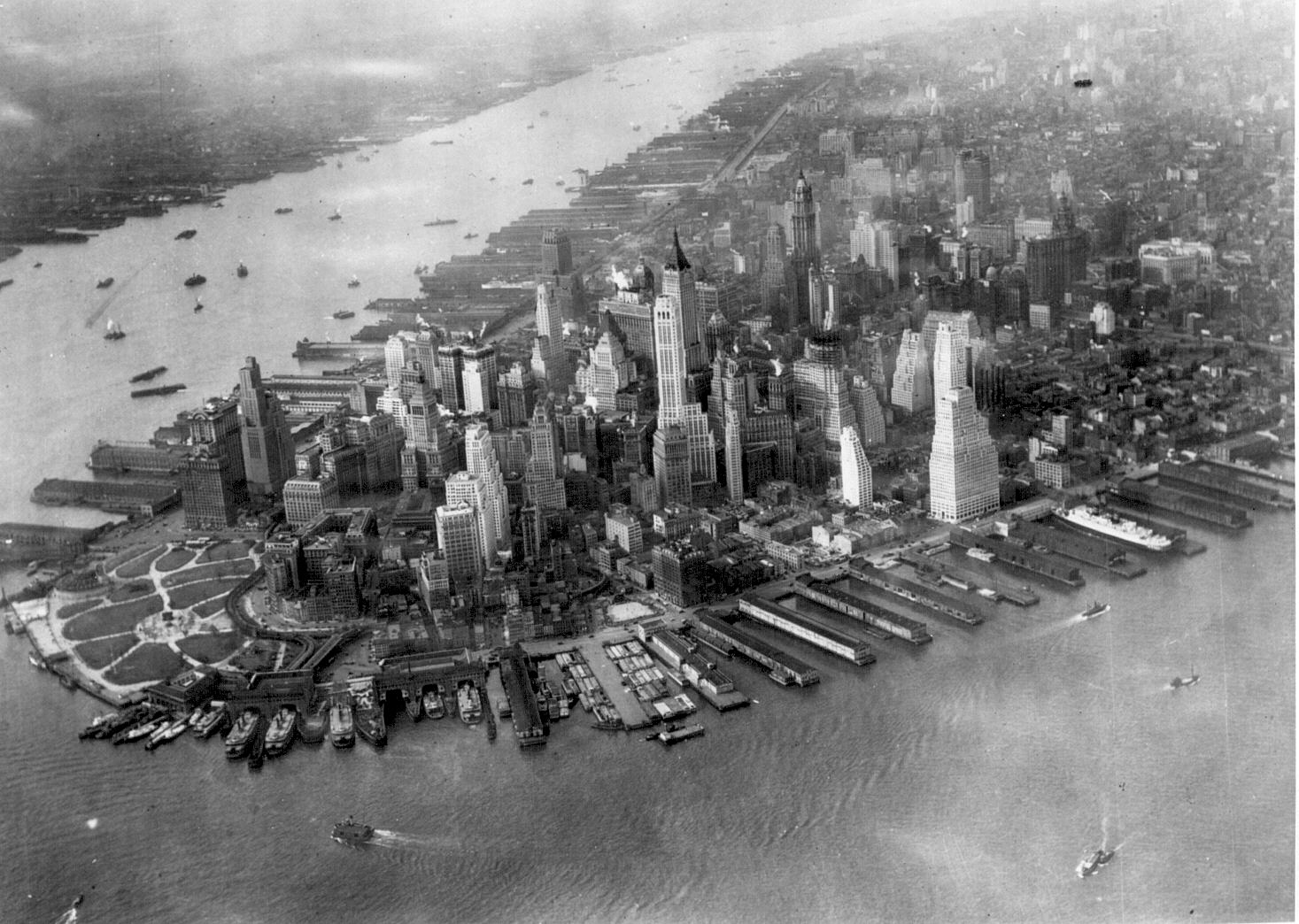
An aerial view of Lower Manhattan in 1931

The history of skyscrapers in New York City began with the construction of the Equitable Life, Western Union, and Tribune buildings in the early 1870s. These relatively short early skyscrapers, sometimes referred to as "preskyscrapers" or "protoskyscrapers", featured steel frames and elevators—then-new innovations later adopted in the city's skyscrapers. Modern skyscraper construction began with the completion of the World Building in 1890; the structure rose to a pinnacle of 349 feet (106 m). Though not the city's first high-rise, it was the first building to surpass the 284-foot (87 m) spire of Trinity Church. The New York World Building, which stood as the tallest in the city until 1899, (Note: As measured to its tip (or pinnacle). Five other skyscrapers in Manhattan had already surpassed its 309-foot (94 m) architectural height by then, starting with the Manhattan Life Insurance Building in 1894. For more on the different criteria used see List of tallest buildings and structures#Tallest buildings) was demolished in 1955 to allow for the construction of an expanded entrance to the Brooklyn Bridge. The Park Row Building, at 391 feet (119 m), was the city's tallest building from 1899 to 1908, and the world's tallest office building during the same time span. By 1900, fifteen skyscrapers in New York City exceeded 250 feet (76 m) in height.

New York has played a prominent role in the development of the skyscraper. Since 1890, ten of those built in the city have held the title of world's tallest. (Note: This considers only skyscrapers by architectural height. It was not until the completion of the Singer Building in 1908 that a skyscraper surpassed the spire of the tallest building constructed using conventional methods. Only the Chrysler and Empire State Buildings held the title of world's tallest overall structure, the latter of which maintained this title for more than two decades until surpassed by Oklahoma's Griffin Television Tower in 1954.) New York City went through a very early high-rise construction boom from the 1890s through the 1910s. Notable skyscrapers completed during the first boom include the Singer Building, which was briefly the tallest building in the world at 612 feet (187 m) when completed in 1908; it was the first skyscraper in New York to exceed 492 feet (150 m) in height. It was surpassed in 1909 by the 700-foot (213 m) Met Life Tower, the earliest skyscraper to reach 492 feet (150 m) that still stands in New York City. The next structure to hold the record as the world's tallest building was completed in 1913: the 792-foot (241 m) Woolworth Building.

After a lull in skyscraper construction in the mid-1910s, a second boom occurred from the mid-1920s to the early 1930s. Skyscrapers reached greater heights in Lower Manhattan and especially in Midtown Manhattan. This period saw the completion of 40 Wall Street, the Chrysler Building, and the Empire State Building, driven by increased commercial demand and economic development during the Roaring Twenties and by developers' desire to outdo one another in height. The Chrysler Building was completed in 1930, one year after the onset of the Great Depression; at a height of 1,049 feet (320 m), it became the world's first supertall skyscraper. The Empire State Building was completed one year later. In total, during the early 20th century, 44 skyscrapers over 492 feet (150 m) were built. Many of the buildings during the second boom were built in the Art Deco style.

=== 1930s–1950s ===
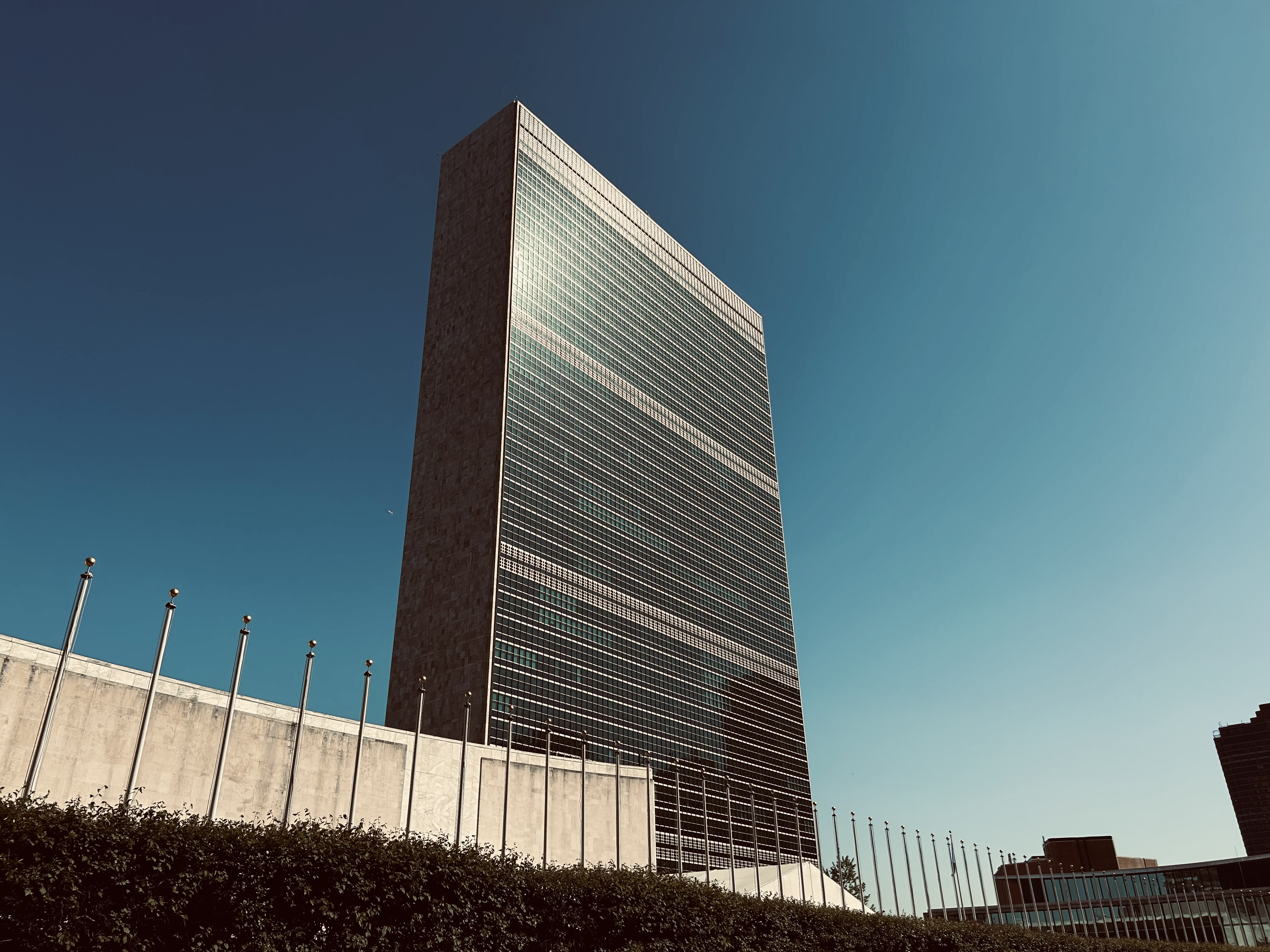
The International-style UN Secretariat Building

After the early 1930s, skyscraper construction came to a halt for over 20 years owing to economic pressures during the Depression and World War II. Many office skyscrapers in Midtown Manhattan had large amounts of vacant space years after completion. A notable exception to the hiatus was the early modernist 75 Rockefeller Plaza, built as a northern extension to the Rockefeller Center in 1947. Gradually, skyscraper development resumed in the 1950s.

Many new skyscrapers eschewed the Art Deco of the early 20th century and were built adhering to the modernist International Style. This style emphasized function over form, often involving fewer or no setbacks, and glass curtain walls. The most prominent of these were the Seagram Building and the United Nations Secretariat Building, the latter of which hosts the offices of the United Nations Secretariat, as New York City was chosen as the headquarters for the newly formed United Nations after the war. Other noteworthy skyscrapers built during the era include the Socony-Mobil Building, 660 Fifth Avenue, 1065 Avenue of the Americas, and 2 Broadway.

=== 1960s–1980s ===
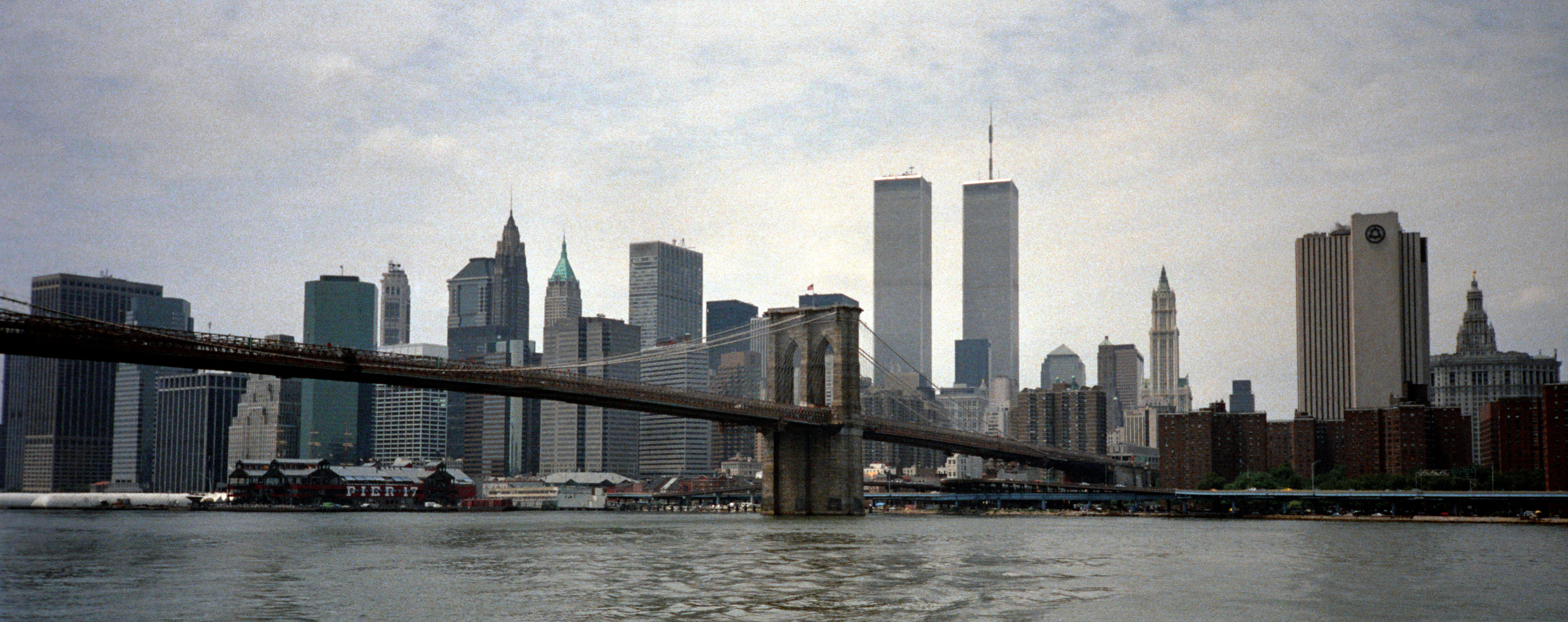
The skyline of Lower Manhattan with the original World Trade Center complex

The 1961 Zoning Resolution incentivized the building of more office skyscrapers in Manhattan. Notable buildings to go up in the 1960s include the octagonal MetLife Building and the General Motors Building. Some early skyscrapers, such as the Singer Building and the City Investing Building, were demolished to make way for new developments.

In 1966, construction began on the World Trade Center complex, including twin supertall skyscrapers measuring 1,368 feet (417 m) and 1,362 feet (415.1 m) in height. Known as the Twin Towers, they reshaped the Lower Manhattan skyline when they topped out in 1970, and over time, became an iconic symbol of New York City. Midtown Manhattan saw increasingly tall skyscrapers like the Citigroup Center and One Penn Plaza in the 1970s; during this decade, the city surpassed 100 skyscrapers above 492 feet (150 m) in height. Another construction surge in the late 1980s increasingly embraced more postmodernist designs, such as CitySpire and 1 Worldwide Plaza.

=== 1990s–present ===
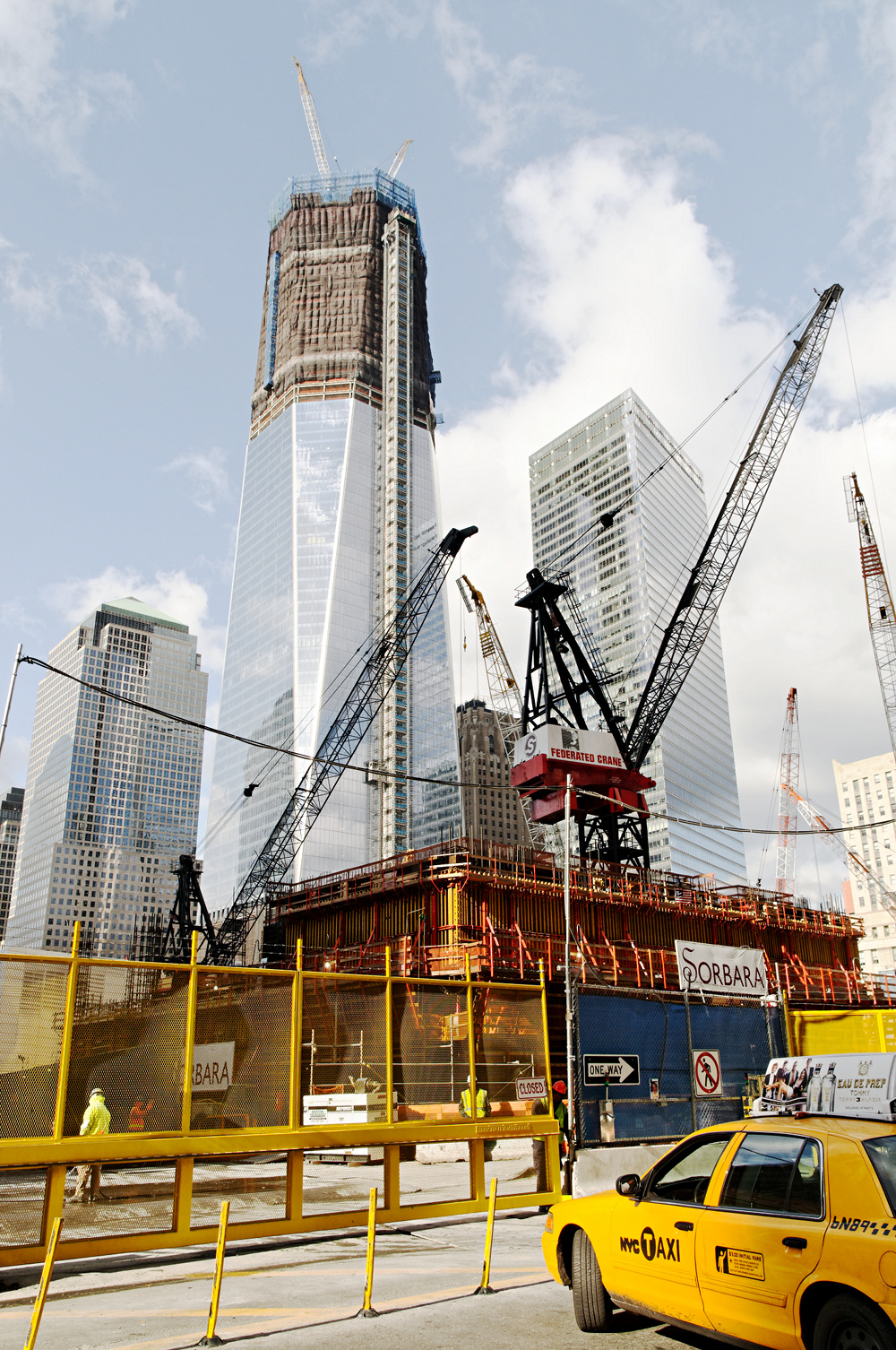
One WTC and 3 WTC under construction in 2011

After the early 1990s, skyscraper development slowed down once more, with the most significant new skyscraper during this lull being 4 Times Square. The 2000s saw the resumption of office skyscraper development, alongside a growing number of residential skyscrapers. The Bank of America Tower and the New York Times Building became the first supertall skyscrapers to be built in the city since the original Twin Towers. The mid-2010s saw a massive surge in construction, with office and residential buildings reaching new heights. While New York City had only two supertall buildings in 2010, that figure has grown to 18 by 2025.

==== WTC redevelopment ====
In 2001, the September 11 attacks led to the collapse of the Twin Towers, the tallest buildings ever to have been destroyed. Plans to rebuild the site were soon proposed, and a design for a new World Trade Center complex was approved in 2004. The centerpiece of the redevelopment, One World Trade Center, was completed in 2014 at a height of 1,776 ft (541.3 m), a symbolic reference to the year of the signing of the United States Declaration of Independence. Upon topping out, the building became the tallest building in the city and the United States. Also part of the complex is 3 World Trade Center, a 1,079 ft (329 m) skyscraper completed in 2018; 4 World Trade Center, a 978 ft (298 m) skyscraper completed in 2013; and 7 World Trade Center, a 743 ft (226 m) skyscraper completed in 2006. The site for a proposed supertall at 2 World Trade Center has been repeatedly delayed, with three designs having been commissioned as of 2025: two from Norman Foster and one from Bjarke Ingels of Bjarke Ingels Group.

==== Supertall boom and Hudson Yards ====
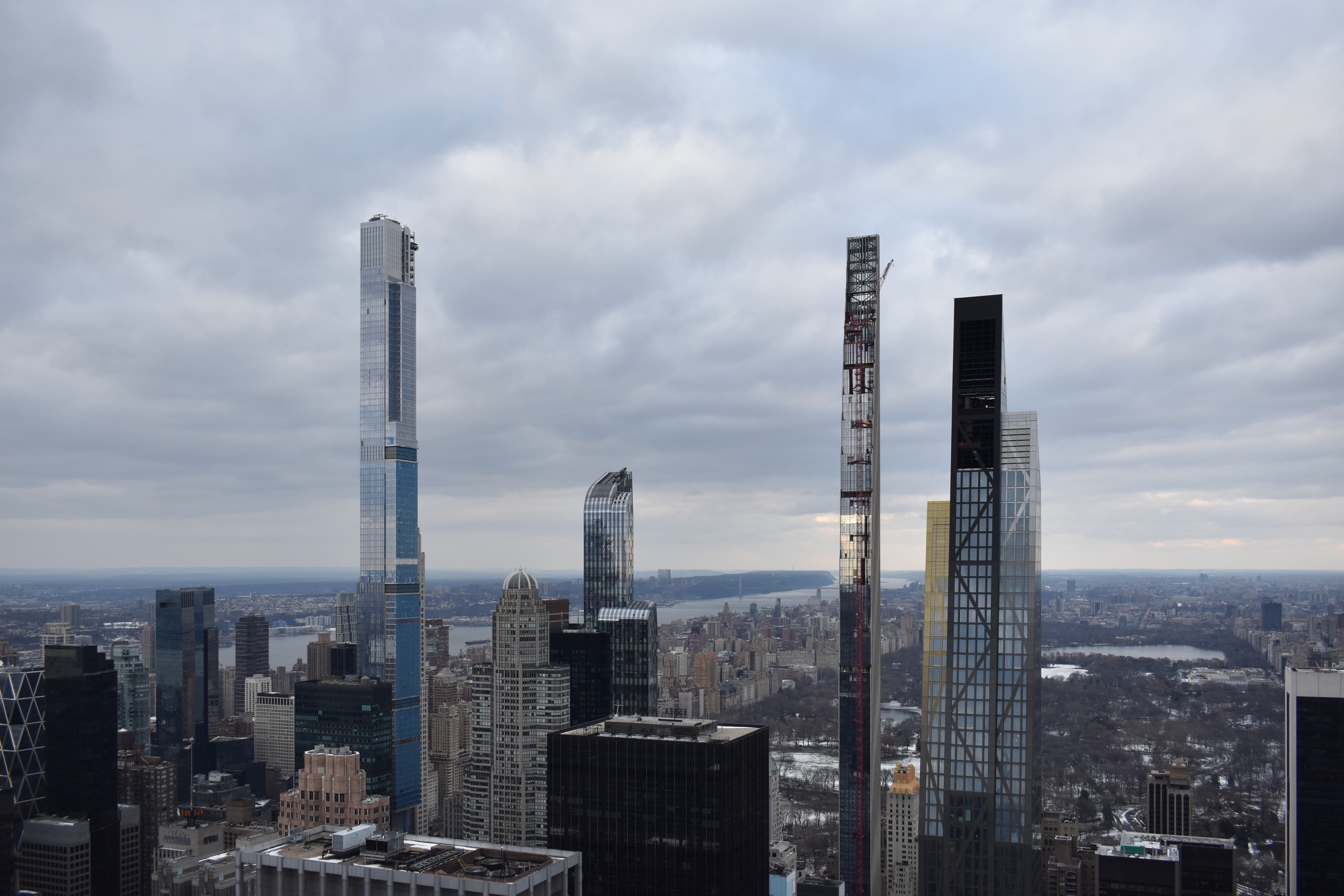
Four major peaks in Billionaire's Row. From left to right: Central Park Tower, One57, 111 West 57th Street, and 53W53

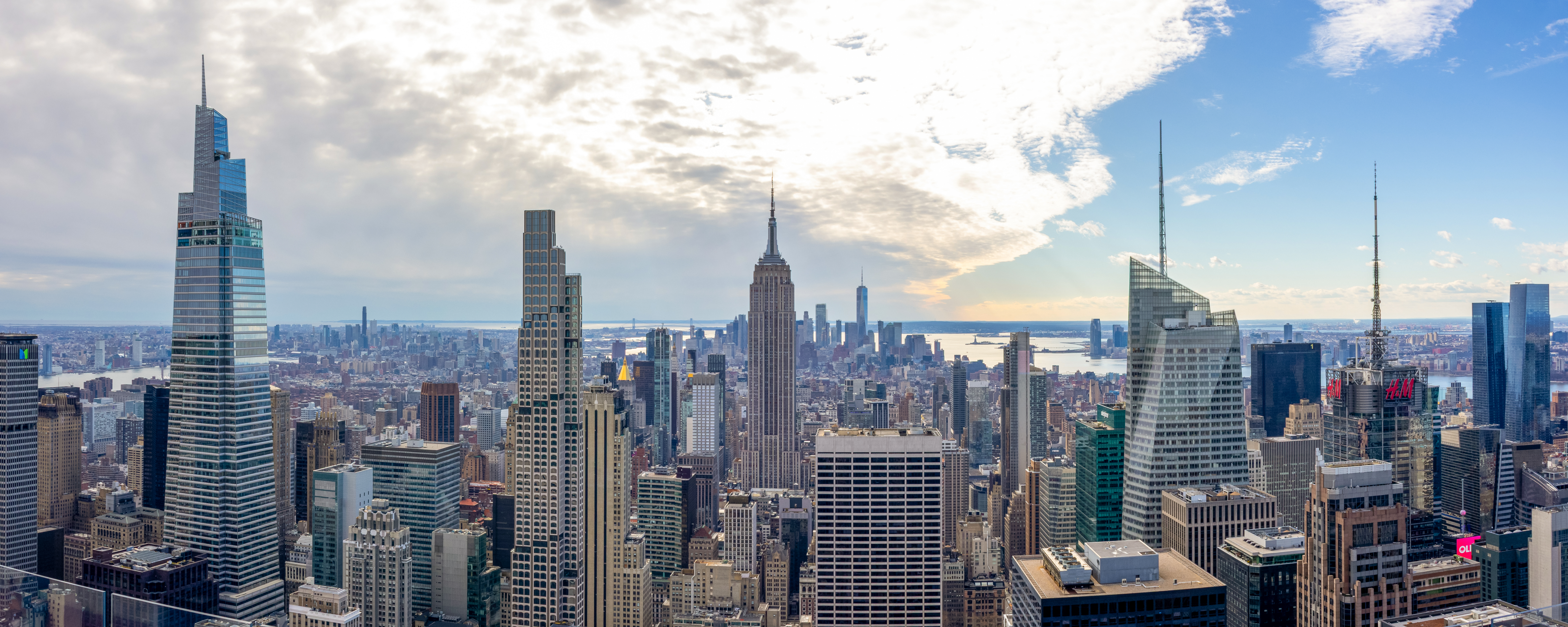
From left to right the peaks of: One Vanderbilt, 520 Fifth Avenue, Empire State, 1 Bryant Park, 4 Times Square

A boom in the development of supertall residential skyscrapers began with One57, developed during the early 2010s, and 432 Park Avenue, which surpassed the height of the Empire State Building to become the tallest building in Midtown Manhattan in 2015. This trend culminated with the completion of 111 West 57th Street and Central Park Tower in the early 2020s, both surpassing 1,400 feet (427 m) in height. These buildings are primarily catered towards the luxury market; their prevalence near the southern side of Central Park has led the area around them to be named "Billionaire's Row".

Two significant commercial supertall skyscrapers, both exceeding 1,300 feet (396 m), have topped out in the 2020s: One Vanderbilt, forming a new peak in the skyline around Grand Central Terminal; and 270 Park Avenue, which serves as the new headquarters of JPMorgan Chase. The western skyline of Midtown Manhattan was also massively transformed by the Hudson Yards development. Built on the eastern side of West Side Yard, Phase I of the development began construction in 2012 and was completed in 2019. Within the development are three supertall skyscrapers: 35 Hudson Yards, 30 Hudson Yards, and The Spiral, alongside several other skyscrapers. Additionally, One Manhattan West, another supertall skyscraper located near Hudson Yards, was completed in 2019. Phase II of Hudson Yards is in planning and could include more supertall buildings and a casino.

Taller residential skyscrapers also arrived at the Upper East Side and Upper West Side areas of Manhattan. 520 Park Avenue became the tallest building on the Upper East Side in 2018, while 200 Amsterdam became the tallest on the Upper West Side in 2021; it was then supplanted by 50 West 66th Street, which was completed in 2025.

==== Beyond Manhattan ====
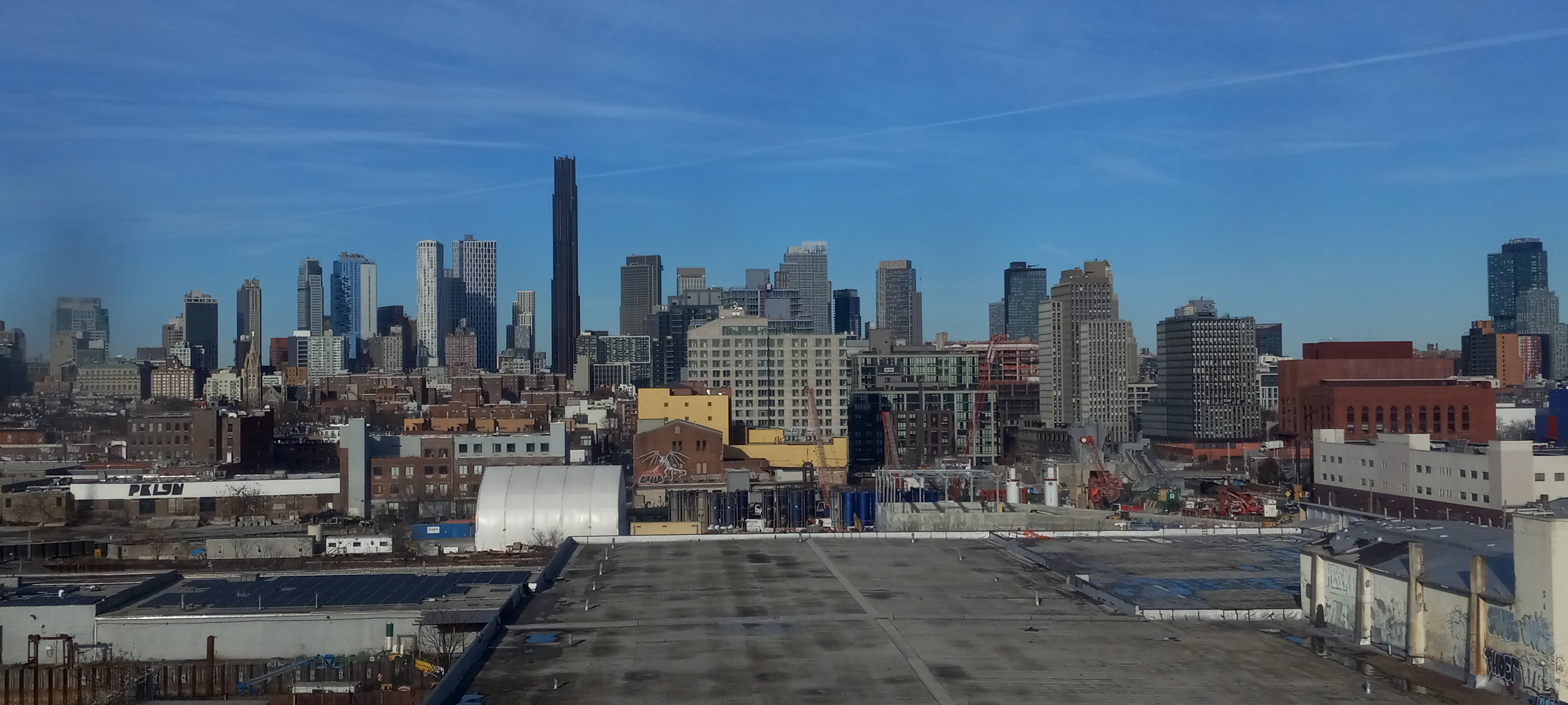
The rapidly growing skyline of Downtown Brooklyn

In the 21st century, skyscrapers became more common in boroughs outside Manhattan. After the completion of the Williamsburgh Savings Bank Tower in Brooklyn in 1929, the building remained the tallest building in the borough for 80 years. However, since the late 2000s, a growing number of residential high-rises have been built in Downtown Brooklyn, which has since formed a significant high-rise skyline of its own. As of 2026, Brooklyn is home to 17 skyscrapers taller than 492 feet (150 m). The tallest, the Brooklyn Tower, was completed in 2022 at 1,066 feet (325 m); it is the first and only supertall skyscraper in the city outside of Manhattan.

The neighborhood of Long Island City (LIC), in Queens, also developed a skyline during the 2010s. One Court Square, an office building built in 1990, was the only skyscraper in Queens for over a decade, until the addition of residential high-rises in the late 2000s; the borough now has 16 skyscrapers taller than 492 feet (150 m). The tallest, The Orchard, has been topped out and completed in 2025. Residential skyscrapers have also been built on the waterfront of East River in Brooklyn and Queens since the late 2010s, particularly in the Williamsburg, Greenpoint, and Hunters Point neighborhoods. On a lesser scale, high-rises developments have become more common in the areas of Flushing, Gowanus, Jamaica, and South Bronx.

Although not located in New York City, the neighborhood of Exchange Place in Jersey City has seen a similar boom in tall buildings since the 2000s. More recently, in the 2020s, the area of Journal Square has also seen an influx in skyscrapers.

== Cityscape ==
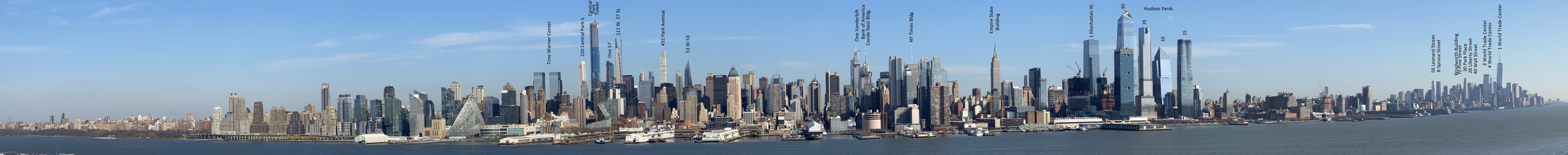
High-resolution panorama of Manhattan's west side, from 115th Street to The Battery, taken from Weehawken, NJ, March 26, 2020. View of Chrysler Building blocked by One Vanderbilt.

== Map of tallest buildings ==
The map below shows the location of every building taller than 650 ft (198 m) in New York City. Each marker is numbered by the building's height rank and colored by the decade of its completion.

Buildings taller than 650 ft (198 m) in New York City
- 1950s and before
- 1960s
- 1970s
- 1980s
- 1990s
- 2000s
- 2010s
- 2020s
1 One World Trade Center
2 Central Park Tower
3 111 West 57th Street
4 One Vanderbilt
5 432 Park Avenue
6 270 Park Avenue
7 30 Hudson Yards
8 Empire State Building
9 Bank of America Tower
10 3 World Trade Center
11 The Brooklyn Tower
12 53W53
13 Chrysler Building
14 The New York Times Building
15 The Spiral
16 One57
17 520 Fifth Avenue
18 35 Hudson Yards
19 One Manhattan West
20 50 Hudson Yards
21 4 World Trade Center
22 70 Pine Street
23 220 Central Park South
24 Two Manhattan West
25 40 Wall Street
26 Four Seasons Hotel New York Downtown
27 Citigroup Center
28 15 Hudson Yards
29 125 Greenwich Street
30 10 Hudson Yards
31 8 Spruce Street
32 Trump World Tower
33 425 Park Avenue
34 262 Fifth Avenue
35 30 Rockefeller Plaza
36 One Manhattan Square
37 Sutton Tower
38 The Orchard
39 56 Leonard Street
40 CitySpire
41 28 Liberty Street
42 4 Times Square
43 MetLife Building
44 731 Lexington Avenue
45 The Madison
46 The Centrale
47 130 William
48 Woolworth Building
49 8 Carlisle Street
50 111 Murray Street
51 520 Park Avenue
52 50 West Street
53 55 Hudson Yards
54 One Worldwide Plaza
55 Madison Square Park Tower
56 50 West 66th Street
57 Skyline Tower
58 19 Dutch
59 Carnegie Hall Tower
60 383 Madison Avenue
61 Sven
62 1717 Broadway
63 Axa Equitable Center
64 1251 Ave. of the Americas
65 One Penn Plaza
66 Deutsche Bank Center (N)
67 Deutsche Bank Center (S)
68 200 West Street
69 One Astor Plaza
70 60 Wall Street
71 Casoni
72 One Liberty Plaza
73 7 World Trade Center
74 20 Exchange Place
75 200 Vesey Street
76 ARO
77 1540 Broadway
78 Lumen
79 The Eugene
80 Times Square Tower
81 Brooklyn Point
82 Metropolitan Tower
83 252 East 57th Street
84 Selene
85 General Motors Building
86 25 Park Row
87 Metropolitan Life Insurance Company Tower
88 500 Fifth Avenue
89 Americas Tower
90 Solow Building
91 140 Broadway
92 277 Park Avenue
93 55 Water Street
94 5 Beekman Street
95 Morgan Stanley Building
96 Random House Tower
97 Four Seasons Hotel New York
98 Sky
99 1221 Ave. of the Americas
100 One Grand Central Place
101 One Court Square
102 Barclay Tower
103 277 Fifth Avenue
104 Paramount Plaza
105 200 Amsterdam
106 Trump Tower
107 1 Wall Street
108 599 Lexington Avenue
109 Silver Towers I
110 Silver Towers II
111 712 Fifth Avenue

== Tallest buildings ==
This list ranks completed and topped out New York City skyscrapers that stand at least 650 feet (198 m) tall based on standard height measurements. This includes spires and architectural details, but does not include antenna masts. An equal sign (=) following a rank indicates the same height between two or more buildings. The "Year" column indicates the year in which a building was completed.

Was New York City's tallest building upon completion
Architecturally topped out but not yet completed

Rank	Name	Image	Location	Height ft (m)	Floors (Note: Floor counts often vary among sources; this list uses the number most widely reported in reference. Read the FAQ on the talk page for details.)	Year	Purpose	Notes
1	One World Trade Center		Lower Manhattan 285 Fulton Street 40°42′47″N 74°00′49″W	1,776 (541)	104	2013	Office	Also known as the Freedom Tower. It is the tallest building in the Western Hemisphere by architectural height. Tallest building in New York City and the United States. 7th-tallest building in the world. Roof height is 1,368 feet (417 m), the same as the original World Trade Center. Footprint of the building is 200 by 200 feet (61 by 61 m), the same as each of the Twin Towers.
2	Central Park Tower		Midtown Manhattan 225 West 57th Street 40°45′59″N 73°58′51″W	1,550 (472)	98	2019	Residential	Tallest building in New York City by roof height at 1,550 feet; highest roof height of any building outside Asia, surpassing the Willis Tower by 100 feet (30 m). Also known as Nordstrom Tower. 15th-tallest building in the world. Tallest building in Midtown Manhattan. The building is also the tallest residential building in the world, both by roof height and architectural height. The top floor is marketed as the 130th floor, but the building only has 98 actual floors.
3	111 West 57th Street		Midtown Manhattan 111 West 57th Street 40°45′52″N 73°58′40″W	1,428 (435)	85	2021	Residential	Also known as Steinway Tower. Second-tallest residential building in the world; the world's most slender skyscraper with a width-to-height ratio of about 1:23. 29th-tallest building in the world.
4	One Vanderbilt		Midtown Manhattan 1 Vanderbilt Avenue 40°45′11″N 73°58′43″W	1,401 (427)	62	2019	Office	Second-tallest office building in NYC. Tallest all-office building in Midtown Manhattan. 31st-tallest building in the world. Due to its tall ceilings, which range from 15 to 24 feet high, it has fewer stories than most buildings of similar height; its top floor is numbered 93. Has the world's highest panoramic elevator.
5	432 Park Avenue		Midtown Manhattan 432 Park Avenue 40°45′41″N 73°58′19″W	1,397 (426)	85	2015	Residential	Third-tallest in NYC by roof height, third-tallest residential building in the world; 33rd-tallest building in the world.
6	270 Park Avenue		Midtown Manhattan 270 Park Avenue 40°45′22″N 73°58′34″W	1,388 (423)	60	2025	Office	Headquarters for JPMorgan Chase; the new tower was approved by the New York City Council in May 2019. 35th-tallest building in the world.
7	30 Hudson Yards		Hudson Yards 500 West 33rd Street 40°45′15″N 74°00′03″W	1,270 (387)	73	2019	Office	Tallest building in Hudson Yards. 53rd-tallest building in the world. It has the highest outdoor observation deck in the Western Hemisphere and the highest open-air building ascent in the world. Top floor marketed as 101.
8	Empire State Building		Midtown Manhattan 350 Fifth Avenue 40°44′54″N 73°59′08″W	1,250 (381)	102 (Note: References typically use the 102 floors figure; however, some state a value of 103 floors instead due to the presence of an encircling balcony above the 102nd floor. See Empire State Building#Opening and early years and Empire State Building#Above the 102nd floor for a detailed explanation.)	1930	Office	First building in the world to contain over 100 floors. Built in just 13 months during the Great Depression, it was the world's tallest building from its completion in 1931 until the original World Trade Center was completed in 1971, and was New York City's tallest building after the World Trade Center was destroyed in the attacks of September 11, 2001, until 2012, when it was surpassed by One World Trade Center. With its antenna, it is 1,454 feet (443 m) tall. 60th-tallest building in the world.
9	Bank of America Tower		Midtown Manhattan 1111 Sixth Avenue 40°45′19″N 73°59′03″W	1,200 (366)	55	2008	Office	First skyscraper to receive a Platinum LEED certification. Roof height is 953.5 feet (291 m). 74th-tallest building in the world.
10	3 World Trade Center		Lower Manhattan 175 Greenwich Street 40°42′39″N 74°00′42″W	1,079 (329)	80	2018	Office	Opened in June 2018. The second tallest building in Lower Manhattan.
11	53W53		Midtown Manhattan 53 West 53rd Street 40°45′42″N 73°58′42″W	1,050 (320)	77	2019	Residential	Formerly known as Tower Verre.
12=	Chrysler Building		Midtown Manhattan 405 Lexington Avenue 40°45′06″N 73°58′31″W	1,046 (319)	77	1930	Office	First building in the world to rise higher than 1,000 feet (305 m); stood as the tallest building in the world from 1930 until 1931 when it was surpassed by the Empire State Building; tallest steel-framed brick building in the world. During construction, it and 40 Wall Street overtook the Eiffel Tower as the world's tallest human-made structures.
12=	The New York Times Building		Midtown Manhattan 620 Eighth Avenue 40°45′23″N 73°59′24″W	1,046 (319)	52	2006	Office	Also known as the Times Tower. The first high-rise building in the United States to have a ceramic sunscreen curtain wall.
14	Brooklyn Tower		Downtown Brooklyn 9 DeKalb Avenue 40°41′25″N 73°58′56″W	1,035 (315)	74 (Note: The highest floor is numbered 93.)	2022	Residential	Tallest building in Brooklyn, the tallest building in the outer boroughs, the tallest building on Long Island, and the tallest building in New York State outside Manhattan Island.
15	The Spiral		Hudson Yards 435 Tenth Avenue 40°45′19″N 73°59′58″W	1,031 (314)	66	2022	Office	34th Street and 10th Avenue, at the north end of the High Line. Almost every floor has its own outdoor terrace.
16	One57		Midtown Manhattan 157 West 57th Street 40°45′55″N 73°58′45″W	1,004 (306)	75	2014	Residential	First of the Billionaires' Row supertalls to be completed.
17	520 Fifth Avenue		Midtown Manhattan 520 Fifth Avenue 40°45′16″N 73°58′50″W	1,002 (305)	76 (Note: The highest floor is numbered 88.)	2026	Residential	Mixed-use building with office space on the lower stories and residences above. Completion date posted for June 1, 2026.
18	35 Hudson Yards		Hudson Yards 532–560 West 33rd Street 40°45′16″N 74°00′09″W	1,000 (305)	72	2019	Mixed-use	Tallest mixed-use skyscraper in New York City, a mixed-use office and residential skyscraper.
19	One Manhattan West		Hudson Yards 401 Ninth Avenue 40°45′10″N 73°59′52″W	996 (304)	67	2019	Office	Tallest building in the Manhattan West development.
20	50 Hudson Yards		Hudson Yards 504 West 34th Street 40°45′16″N 74°00′00″W	981 (299)	58	2022	Office	Last tower to be built as part of Phase 1 of Hudson Yards, anchored by BlackRock.
21	4 World Trade Center		Lower Manhattan 150 Greenwich Street 40°42′37″N 74°00′43″W	977 (298)	72	2013	Office	Also known as 150 Greenwich Street, part of the rebuilding of the World Trade Center.
22	70 Pine Street		Lower Manhattan 70 Pine Street 40°42′23″N 74°00′28″W	952 (290)	67	1932	Residential	Formerly known as the American International Building and the Cities Service Building. 70 Pine was transformed into a residential skyscraper with 644 rental residences, 132 hotel rooms and 35,000 square feet of retail space, opening in 2015. It was the third-tallest building in the world upon completion. It stood as the tallest building in Lower Manhattan from its completion until the construction of the original World Trade Center towers in the 1970s, then regained that status after 9/11, holding it until the construction of the new One World Trade Center.
23	220 Central Park South		Midtown Manhattan 220 59th Street 40°46′02″N 73°58′49″W	950 (290)	67	2019	Residential	The project, developed by Vornado Realty Trust, cost $1.4 billion.
24	Two Manhattan West		Hudson Yards 401 West 31st Street 40°45′08″N 73°59′53″W	935 (285)	58	2024	Office	Construction began after law firm Cravath, Swaine & Moore signed a lease for 13 floors in October 2019.
25	40 Wall Street		Lower Manhattan 40 Wall Street 40°42′25″N 74°00′35″W	927 (283)	71	1930	Office	Formerly known as the Bank of Manhattan Trust Building. Also known as the Trump Building, it is now called 40 Wall Street. Was the world's tallest building for less than two months before being surpassed by the Chrysler Building.
26	Four Seasons Hotel New York Downtown		Lower Manhattan 27 Barclay Street 40°42′47″N 74°00′34″W	926 (282)	67	2016	Mixed-use	Mixed-use hotel and residential skyscraper. Also known as 30 Park Place.
27	Citigroup Center		Midtown Manhattan 601 Lexington Avenue 40°45′31″N 73°58′13″W	915 (279)	59	1977	Office	Formerly Citicorp Center and now known as 601 Lexington Avenue.
28	15 Hudson Yards		Hudson Yards 545 West 30th Street 40°45′13″N 74°00′12″W	914 (279)	70	2019	Residential	Attached to The Shed, a cultural center.
29	125 Greenwich Street		Lower Manhattan 125 Greenwich Street 40°42′33″N 74°00′46″W	912 (278)	72	2025	Residential	The building yields 272 condominium units. Its original design was significantly taller than the final design.
30	10 Hudson Yards		Hudson Yards 501 West 30th Street 40°45′09″N 74°00′04″W	878 (268)	52	2016	Office	First of the Hudson Yards towers to be completed.
31	8 Spruce Street		Lower Manhattan 8 Spruce Street 40°42′39″N 74°00′20″W	870 (265)	76	2011	Residential	Also known as Beekman Tower and New York by Gehry.
32	Trump World Tower		Midtown Manhattan 845 United Nations Plaza 40°45′08″N 73°58′04″W	861 (262)	72	2001	Residential	Tallest residential building in the world from 2000 until 2003.
33=	425 Park Avenue		Midtown Manhattan 425 Park Avenue 40°45′38″N 73°58′16″W	860 (262)	44	2021	Office	Designed by Norman Foster.
33=	262 Fifth Avenue		NoMad 262 Fifth Avenue 40°44′43″N 73°59′14″W	860 (262)	56	2026	Residential	Tallest building in NoMad. Upon opening, the building will yield 26 condominium units. Facade installation still progressing towards completion as of December 2025.
35	30 Rockefeller Plaza		Midtown Manhattan 30 Rockefeller Plaza 40°45′32″N 73°58′44″W	850 (259)	70	1933	Office	Also known as the Comcast Building, formerly known as the GE Building, and the RCA Building before that; colloquially referred to as "30 Rock" for its address, houses NBC Studios and the Top of the Rock observation deck.
36=	One Manhattan Square		Two Bridges 250 South Street 40°42′37″N 73°59′29″W	847 (258)	72	2019	Residential	Also known as 250 South Street or 227 Cherry Street.
36=	Sutton Tower		Midtown Manhattan 426–432 East 58th Street 40°45′30″N 73°57′41″W	847 (258)	65	2022	Residential	Residential tower rising in Sutton Place, also known as 3 Sutton Place.
38	The Orchard		Long Island City 27-48 Jackson Avenue 40°44′53″N 73°56′21″W	823 (251)	69	2026	Residential	The tallest building in Queens, and the second tallest building outside of Manhattan behind The Brooklyn Tower.
39	56 Leonard Street		Lower Manhattan 56 Leonard Street 40°43′04″N 74°00′23″W	821 (250)	57	2016	Residential	The tallest structure in Tribeca.
40	CitySpire		Midtown Manhattan 156 West 56th Street 40°45′52″N 73°58′47″W	814 (248)	75	1987	Mixed-use	Mixed-use office and residential building. Was NYC's tallest mixed-use building at the time of its completion.
41	28 Liberty Street		Lower Manhattan 28 Liberty Street 40°42′28″N 74°00′32″W	813 (248)	60	1961	Office	Known until sale in 2015 as One Chase Manhattan Plaza.
42	4 Times Square		Midtown Manhattan 1472 Broadway 40°45′21″N 73°59′09″W	809 (247)	48	1999	Office	Height is 809 feet to the mast structure. Roof height is 701 feet. Antenna height is 1118 feet. Formerly known as the Condé Nast Building.
43	MetLife Building		Midtown Manhattan 200 Park Avenue 40°45′12″N 73°58′36″W	808 (246)	59	1963	Office	Formerly known as the Pan Am Building.
44	731 Lexington Avenue		Midtown Manhattan 731 Lexington Avenue 40°45′43″N 73°58′05″W	806 (246)	54	2004	Office	It houses the headquarters of Bloomberg L.P. and as a result, is sometimes referred to informally as Bloomberg Tower.
45	The Madison		NoMad 15 East 30th Street 40°44′44″N 73°59′07″W	805 (245)	56	2021	Residential	Also known as 126 Madison Avenue.
46	The Centrale		Midtown Manhattan 138 East 50th Street 40°45′21″N 73°58′19″W	803 (245)	64	2019	Residential	Also known by its address, 138 East 50th Street.
47	130 William		Lower Manhattan 130 William Street 40°42′33″N 74°00′22″W	800 (244)	66	2022	Residential	Designed by David Adjaye; his first high-rise tower in New York City.
48	Woolworth Building		Lower Manhattan 233 Broadway 40°42′44″N 74°00′29″W	792 (241)	58	1913	Mixed-use	Tallest building in the world from 1913 until 1930, before being surpassed by 40 Wall Street. Now a mixed-use office and residential building.
49	8 Carlisle Street		Lower Manhattan 111 Washington Street 40°45′16″N 73°58′40″W	789 (240)	64	2027	Residential	Also known as 8 Carlisle Street. Excavation work on the site was first reported in June 2023 and was still underway as of October 2023. The building will include 462 residential units, 7,000 square feet of commercial space, and a 60-foot-long rear yard. Topped out in August 2026.
50	111 Murray Street		Lower Manhattan 111 Murray Street 40°42′56″N 74°00′46″W	788 (240)	60	2018	Residential	Formerly known as 101 Tribeca. The building's curtain wall has rounded corners and an asymmetrical, sloped crown.
51	520 Park Avenue		Midtown Manhattan 520 Park Avenue 40°45′51″N 73°58′12″W	781 (238)	54	2018	Residential	Includes 33 residential units.
52=	50 West Street		Lower Manhattan 50 West Street 40°42′29″N 74°00′54″W	779 (237)	64	2018	Residential	Topped out in 2015.
52=	55 Hudson Yards		Hudson Yards 550 West 34th Street 40°45′19″N 74°00′06″W	779 (237)	51	2018	Office	1.3-million-square foot, LEED Gold-certified office tower.
54=	One Worldwide Plaza		Hell's Kitchen 825 Eighth Avenue 40°45′44″N 73°59′13″W	778 (237)	47	1989	Office	Built in the postmodern style, designed by SOM; David Childs was the lead architect.
54=	Madison Square Park Tower		Flatiron District 45 East 22nd Street 40°44′24″N 73°59′14″W	778 (237)	61	2017	Residential	Designed by Kohn Pedersen Fox.
56	50 West 66th Street		Upper West Side 50 West 66th Street 40°46′22″N 73°58′49″W	775 (236)	52	2025	Residential	Became the tallest building on the Upper West Side upon completion.
57	Skyline Tower		Long Island City 23-15 44th Drive 40°44′53″N 73°56′40″W	763 (233)	67	2021	Residential	The second-tallest building in Queens, and the third-tallest in the outer boroughs.
58	19 Dutch		Lower Manhattan 19 Dutch Street 40°42′35″N 74°00′27″W	758 (231)	63	2018	Residential	Also called 118 Fulton Street.
59	Carnegie Hall Tower		Midtown Manhattan 152 West 57th Street 40°45′53″N 73°58′47″W	757 (231)	60	1991	Office	The main shaft is a mere 50 feet (15 m) wide.
60=	383 Madison Avenue		Midtown Manhattan 383 Madison Avenue 40°45′20″N 73°58′37″W	755 (230)	47	2001	Office	Formerly known as Bear Stearns World Headquarters.
60=	Sven		Long Island City 29–37 41st Avenue 40°45′00″N 73°56′11″W	755 (230)	67	2021	Residential	Third-tallest building in Queens after Skyline Tower and The Orchard.
62	1717 Broadway		Midtown Manhattan 1717 Broadway 40°45′52″N 73°58′57″W	753 (230)	68	2013	Hotel	It houses the Courtyard & Residence Inn Manhattan/Central Park hotel. Tallest hotel-only skyscraper in New York City. Tallest hotel in the Western Hemisphere.
63	Axa Equitable Center		Midtown Manhattan 787 Seventh Avenue 40°45′42″N 73°58′54″W	752 (229)	51	1985	Office	Formerly known as the Equitable Building and Equitable Center West.
64=	1251 Avenue of the Americas		Midtown Manhattan 1251 Sixth Avenue 40°45′36″N 73°58′53″W	750 (229)	54	1972	Office	Formerly known as the Exxon Building.
64=	One Penn Plaza		Midtown Manhattan 250 West 34th Street 40°45′05″N 73°59′35″W	750 (229)	57	1972	Office	Tallest building in the Penn Plaza complex.
64=	Deutsche Bank Center North Tower		Midtown Manhattan 10 Columbus Circle 40°46′08″N 73°58′59″W	750 (229)	55	2004	Office	Tallest twin buildings in the United States. Originally constructed as the AOL Time Warner Center, the complex was renamed the Deutsche Bank Center in 2021.
64=	Deutsche Bank Center South Tower		Midtown Manhattan 10 Columbus Circle 40°46′06″N 73°59′01″W	750 (229)	55	2004	Office	Tallest twin buildings in the United States. Originally constructed as the AOL Time Warner Center, the complex was renamed the Deutsche Bank Center in 2021.
64=	200 West Street		Lower Manhattan 200 West Street 40°42′53″N 74°00′51″W	750 (229)	44	2010	Office	Also known as Goldman Sachs World Headquarters.
69=	One Astor Plaza		Midtown Manhattan 1515 Broadway 40°45′29″N 73°59′11″W	745 (227)	54	1972	Office	Located on the site formerly occupied by the Hotel Astor. Houses the world headquarters of Paramount Global.
69=	60 Wall Street		Lower Manhattan 60 Wall Street 40°42′23″N 74°00′30″W	745 (227)	55	1989	Office	Also known as Deutsche Bank Building.
71=	Casoni		Midtown Manhattan 989-993 Sixth Avenue 40°45′06″N 73°59′13″W	743 (226)	68	2026	Residential	Also known as 100 West 37th Street. Demolition began in 2023. Topped off in August 2025. The building will have 300 condominiums.
71=	One Liberty Plaza		Lower Manhattan 165 Broadway 40°42′35″N 74°00′41″W	743 (226)	54	1972	Office	Formerly known as the U.S. Steel Building.
71=	7 World Trade Center		Lower Manhattan 250 Greenwich Street 40°42′48″N 74°00′43″W	743 (226)	49	2006	Office	First tower in the new World Trade Center complex to be completed.
74	20 Exchange Place		Lower Manhattan 20 Exchange Place 40°42′20″N 74°00′35″W	741 (226)	57	1931	Residential	Formerly known as the City Bank-Farmers Trust Building. Was the fourth-tallest building in New York City when it was finished, behind Chrysler, 40 Wall, and Woolworth Bldgs.
75	200 Vesey Street		Lower Manhattan 200 Vesey Street 40°42′49″N 74°00′53″W	739 (225)	51	1986	Office	Formerly known as Three World Financial Center and American Express Tower.
76	ARO		Midtown Manhattan 242 West 53rd Street 40°45′49″N 73°59′03″W	738 (225)	54	2018	Residential	Also known as 242 West 53rd Street and Roseland Tower.
77	1540 Broadway		Midtown Manhattan 1540 Broadway 40°45′29″N 73°59′05″W	733 (223)	42	1990	Office	Also known as the Bertelsmann Building.
78	Lumen		Long Island City 43-30 24th Street 40°44′56″N 73°56′38″W	731 (223)	66	2025	Residential	Foundation work began in December 2022, and the building rose above street level in March 2023 and topped off in July 2024. The building will be residential, with 921 units and ground-floor commercial space.
79	The Eugene		Hudson Yards 401 West 31st Street 40°45′08″N 73°59′56″W	730 (223)	64	2017	Residential	Part of the Manhattan West project, home to 844 residential units.
80	Times Square Tower		Midtown Manhattan 7 Times Square 40°45′20″N 73°59′12″W	724 (221)	47	2004	Office	Also called 7 Times Square: designed by David Childs of SOM.
81	Brooklyn Point		Downtown Brooklyn 138 Willoughby Street 40°41′31″N 73°58′59″W	723 (220)	57	2020	Residential	Second-tallest building in the borough of Brooklyn.
82	Metropolitan Tower		Midtown Manhattan 146 West 57th Street 40°45′54″N 73°58′45″W	716 (218)	68	1985	Mixed-use	Mixed-use residential and office building. Immediately adjacent to Carnegie Hall Tower, separated by the Russian Tea Room.
83	252 East 57th Street		Midtown Manhattan 252 East 57th Street 40°45′33″N 73°57′57″W	712 (217)	65	2016	Residential	The complex includes two schools and a Whole Foods Market.
84	Selene		Midtown Manhattan 100 East 53rd Street 40°45′30″N 73°58′17″W	711 (217)	61	2018	Residential	Also known by its address, 100 East 53rd Street, or 610 Lexington Avenue.
85	General Motors Building		Midtown Manhattan 767 Fifth Avenue 40°45′50″N 73°58′21″W	705 (215)	50	1968	Office	Occupies a full city block.
86	25 Park Row		Lower Manhattan 25 Park Row 40°42′41″N 74°00′26″W	702 (214)	54	2020	Mixed-use	Mixed-use office and residential skyscraper. Also known as 23 Park Row.
87	Metropolitan Life Insurance Company Tower		Flatiron District 1 Madison Avenue 40°44′28″N 73°59′15″W	700 (213)	50	1909	Mixed-use	Tallest building in the world from 1909 until 1913, before being surpassed by the Woolworth Building. Currently, it is a mixed-use office and hotel building.
88	500 Fifth Avenue		Midtown Manhattan 500 Fifth Avenue 40°45′14″N 73°58′53″W	697 (212)	59	1931	Office	Became a city landmark in 2010.
89	Americas Tower		Midtown Manhattan 1177 Sixth Avenue 40°45′26″N 73°58′58″W	692 (211)	48	1992	Office	Also known as 1177 Avenue of the Americas.
90	Solow Building		Midtown Manhattan 9 West 57th Street 40°45′50″N 73°58′29″W	689 (210)	49	1974	Office	The building's facades curve inward from ground level to the 18th floor.
91	140 Broadway		Lower Manhattan 140 Broadway 40°42′31″N 74°00′36″W	688 (210)	52	1967	Office	Also known as Marine Midland Building, HSBC Bank Building.
92=	277 Park Avenue		Midtown Manhattan 277 Park Avenue 40°45′19″N 73°58′28″W	687 (209)	50	1963	Office	One of the 41 buildings in Manhattan that had their own ZIP codes as of 2019; its ZIP code is 10172.
92=	55 Water Street		Lower Manhattan 55 Water Street 40°42′12″N 74°00′33″W	687 (209)	53	1972	Office	The largest building in New York by square footage, totaling about 3.5 million square feet.
92=	5 Beekman Street		Lower Manhattan 5 Beekman Street 40°42′40″N 74°00′25″W	687 (209)	47	2017	Mixed-use	Mixed-use hotel and residential building. Also known as The Beekman Hotel & Residences.
95	Morgan Stanley Building		Midtown Manhattan 1585 Broadway 40°45′37″N 73°59′08″W	685 (209)	42	1989	Office	Also known as 1585 Broadway. It houses the Morgan Stanley World Headquarters.
96	Random House Tower		Midtown Manhattan 1745 Broadway 40°45′55″N 73°58′57″W	684 (208)	52	2003	Mixed-use	Mixed-use office and residential building.
97	Four Seasons Hotel New York		Midtown Manhattan 57 East 57th Street 40°45′44″N 73°58′17″W	682 (208)	52	1993	Hotel	Designed in the New Classical style.
98	Sky		Hell's Kitchen 605 West 42nd Street 40°45′41″N 73°59′55″W	676 (206)	61	2015	Residential	Also known as 605 West 42nd Street and Atelier II. Largest single tower residence in New York City. Sky comprises 1,175 luxury units and includes more than 70,000 sq ft of amenity space.
99	1221 Avenue of the Americas		Midtown Manhattan 1221 Sixth Avenue 40°45′33″N 73°58′54″W	674 (205)	51	1972	Office	Formerly known as the McGraw-Hill Building.
100=	One Grand Central Place		Midtown Manhattan 60 East 42nd Street 40°45′08″N 73°58′44″W	673 (205)	53	1930	Office	Formerly known as the Lincoln Building.
100=	One Court Square		Long Island City 2501 Jackson Avenue 40°44′49″N 73°56′38″W	673 (205)	50	1990	Office	Tallest building in the Borough of Queens from 1990 to 2021. Formerly known as the Citigroup Building.
100=	Barclay Tower		Lower Manhattan 10 Barclay Street 40°42′44″N 74°00′33″W	673 (205)	56	2007	Residential	Contains 441 rental units.
100=	277 Fifth Avenue		NoMad 277 Fifth Avenue 40°44′44″N 73°59′11″W	673 (205)	55	2018	Residential	Alternatively known as 281 Fifth Avenue.
104	Paramount Plaza		Midtown Manhattan 1633 Broadway 40°45′44″N 73°59′04″W	670 (204)	48	1970	Office	Formerly the Uris Building.
105	200 Amsterdam Avenue		Upper West Side 200 Amsterdam Avenue 40°46′36″N 73°59′00″W	668 (204)	55	2021	Residential	Second tallest building on the Upper West Side.
106	Trump Tower		Midtown Manhattan 725 Fifth Avenue 40°45′45″N 73°58′26″W	664 (202)	58	1982	Mixed-use	Mixed-use office and residential tower.
107	1 Wall Street		Lower Manhattan 1 Wall Street 40°42′26″N 74°00′42″W	654 (199)	50	1932	Residential	Originally an office tower. It was formerly called Bank of New York Building and Irving Trust Building.
108=	599 Lexington Avenue		Midtown Manhattan 599 Lexington Avenue 40°45′28″N 73°58′15″W	653 (199)	51	1986	Office	Designed by Edward Larrabee Barnes.
108=	Silver Towers I		Hell's Kitchen 620 West 42nd Street 40°45′39″N 73°59′56″W	653 (199)	58	2009	Residential	Also known as River Place I, or Silver Towers East.
108=	Silver Towers II		Hell's Kitchen 620 West 42nd Street 40°45′39″N 73°59′58″W	653 (199)	58	2009	Residential	Also known as River Place II, or Silver Towers West.
111	712 Fifth Avenue		Midtown Manhattan 712 Fifth Avenue 40°45′44″N 73°58′30″W	650 (198)	53	1990	Office	Designed by SLCE Architects and KPF, the skyscraper's base is home to the Coty Building and the Rizzoli Bookstore building.

=== Tallest buildings by pinnacle height ===
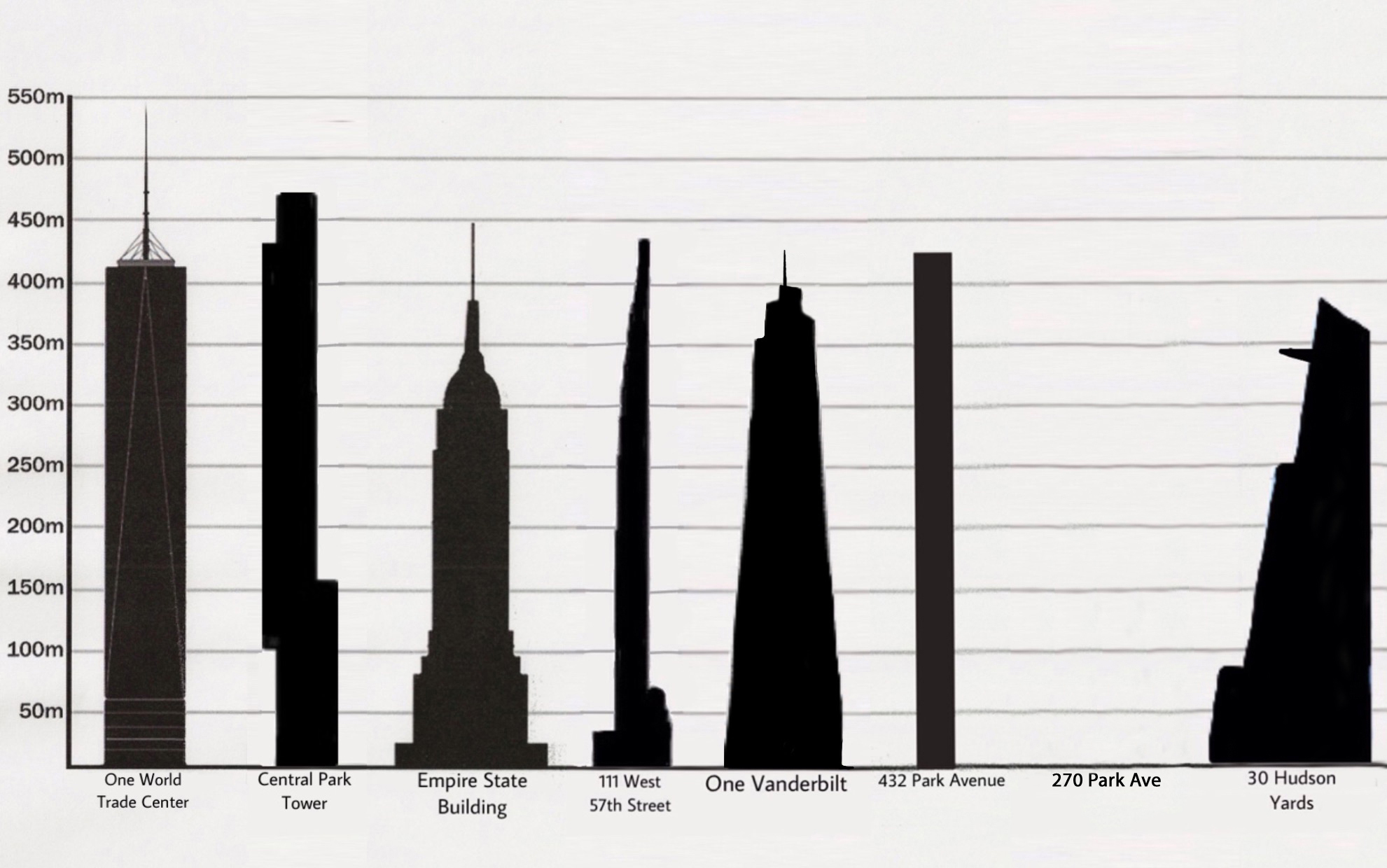
Tallest buildings in NYC, by pinnacle height, including all masts, antennae, poles, etc., whether architectural or not.

This list ranks buildings in New York City by pinnacle height, including antenna masts. Standard architectural height measurement, which excludes non-architectural antennas in building height, is included for comparative purposes. An equal sign (=) following a rank indicates the same height between two or more buildings. The "Year" column indicates the year in which a building was completed.

Pinn. Rank	Std. Rank	Name	Pinnacle height ft (m)	Standard height ft (m)	Floors	Year	Sources
1	1	One World Trade Center	1,792 (546)	1,776 (541)	104	2014	
2	2	Central Park Tower	1,550 (472)	1,550 (472)	98	2020	
3	8	Empire State Building	1,454 (443) (Note: Prior to 1985, the pinnacle height was 1,472 feet (449 m). This was reduced to the current value when the original antenna was replaced by a shorter one.)	1,250 (381)	102	1931	
4	3	111 West 57th Street	1,428 (435)	1,428 (435)	84	2021	
5	4	One Vanderbilt	1,401 (427)	1,401 (427)	62	2020	
6	5	432 Park Avenue	1,397 (426)	1,397 (426)	85	2015	
7	6	270 Park Avenue	1,388 (423)	1,388 (423)	60	2025	
8	7	30 Hudson Yards	1,270 (387)	1,270 (387)	73	2019	
9	9	Bank of America Tower	1,200 (366)	1,200 (366)	55	2009	
10	39	Condé Nast Building	1,118 (341)	809 (247)	48	1999	

=== Tallest buildings in each borough ===
This lists the tallest building in each borough of New York City based on standard height measurement. The "Year" column indicates the year in which a building was completed.

Borough	Name	Height ft (m)	Floors	Year	Source
Bronx	Harlem River Park Towers I & II	428 (130)	44	1975	
Brooklyn	Brooklyn Tower	1,035 (315)	73	2022	
Manhattan	One World Trade Center	1,776 (541)	104	2014	
Queens	The Orchard	823 (251)	69	2024	
Staten Island	Old Church of St. Joachim and St. Anne	225 (69)	1	1891	

== Tallest under construction or proposed ==
=== Under construction ===
This lists buildings currently under construction in New York City that are expected to reach a height of at least 650 feet (198 m). Buildings under construction that have already been topped out are included in the table above. The "year" column indicates the expected year of completion. A dash "–" indicates information about the building is unknown or not publicly available. For buildings whose heights have not yet been released by their developers, this table uses a floor count of 50 stories as the cutoff.

Name	Height ft (m)	Floors	Year (est.)	Address	Coordinates	Notes
2 World Trade Center	1,226 (374)	55	2031	200 Greenwich Street	40°42′43″N 74°00′40″W	Will become the second-tallest building in the new World Trade Center complex upon completion. In 2026, American Express announced it would develop and occupy a new headquarters tower on the site, with groundbreaking occurring on July 9, 2026. American Express expects the project to be completed in 2031.
37–47 West 57th Street	1,100 (335)	63	—	41–47 West 57th Street	40°45′52″N 73°58′35″W	Proposed by developer Sedesco with a design by OMA. Demolition work was completed on the site as of August 2021. Demolition of 37 West 57th Street, whose site will be an addition to the main tower's, has been underway since at least January 2025.
740 Eighth Avenue	1,067 (325)	52	2027	740 Eighth Avenue	40°45′34″N 73°59′16″W	Also known as "The Torch". Approved by the city in December 2021. Excavation underway as of October 2022. The project was put on hold in 2024 but resumed by mid-2025. Plans call for a hotel, with a "vertical-drop" ride and observation tower.
570 Fifth Avenue	~900 (274)	52	2028	570 Fifth Avene	40°45′23″N 73°58′45″W	Excavation began on a 567-foot tower in February 2025. Building has since been upsized to around 900 feet and 52 floors.
343 Madison Avenue	844 (257)	46	2029	343 Madison Avenue	40°45′16″N 73°58′40″W	Under-construction office tower designed by Kohn Pedersen Fox and developed by BXP, Inc. to replace the former Metropolitan Transportation Authority headquarters across from Grand Central Terminal. Demolition was completed in March 2023, with excavation progressing as of December 2025. Norges Bank Investment Management was an investor in the project, but sold their stake back to BXP in 2025.
70 Hudson Yards	832 (254)	49	2029	517 West 35th Street	40°45′22″N 73°59′58″W	Groundbreaking began on June 12, 2025. As of December 2025, foundation work is reported to be underway.
One Third Avenue	730 (222)	62	2027	80 Flatbush Avenue	40°41′09″N 73°58′46″W	Approved by the New York City Council in September 2018. The development will have two buildings; excavation on the site of the shorter building began in late 2021.
625 Madison Avenue	684 (208)	37	2029	625 Madison Avenue	40°45′48″N 73°58′17″W	Designed by SLCE Architects. The original occupant of the site was a mid-1950s commercial office building with a glass facade and 17 stories. On-site demolition started by late 2024 and was completed by December 2025.
24-19 Jackson Ave	676 (206)	55	2028	24-19 Jackson Ave	40°44′47″N 73°56′41″W	Under construction as of December 2025.
One Montague Place	672 (205)	51	2029	205 Montague Street	40°41′38″N 73°59′28″W	Construction commenced in July 2026.

=== On hold ===
This lists buildings in New York City that were previously under construction and expected to reach a height of 650 feet (198 m), but whose construction has since stopped.

Name	Height ft (m)	Floors	Year	Address	Coordinates	Notes
3 Hudson Boulevard	987 (301)	56	—	555 West 34th Street	40°45′20″N 74°00′06″W	Formerly known as GiraSole. The project remains on hold, though the developer's head of commercial leasing said in November 2021 that he is "hopeful that we'll have more significant news in the next six months or so" about the status of the project.
45 Broad Street	—	52	—	45 Broad Street	40°42′20″N 74°00′41″W	Would become the tallest residential building in Downtown Manhattan if completed; has been on hold since 2020. A redesign of the building was revealed in 2023; it appears to have been scaled down from the original height, and reduced from 68 to 52 stories.
161 Maiden Lane	670 (204)	60	—	161 Maiden Lane	40°42′20″N 74°00′17″W	On hold since 2018 due to issues with the building's foundation.
45 Park Place	667 (203)	43	—	45 Park Place	40°42′50″N 74°00′35″W	On hold since 2019.

=== Approved ===
This table lists buildings approved for construction in New York City that are expected to rise at least 650 feet (198 m) in height. For buildings whose heights have not yet been released by their developers, this table uses 50 stories as the cutoff.

Name	Height ft (m)	Floors	Year (est.)	Notes
175 Park Avenue	1,581 (482)	95	2032	An Environmental Assessment Statement for 109 East 42nd Street in Midtown East reveals details for a proposed development called Project Commodore, a 1,581-foot-tall skyscraper on the site currently occupied by the Hyatt Grand Central New York. The building will be developed by RXR Realty and TF Cornerstone to designs by architectural firm Skidmore, Owings & Merrill. Some images of plans for the new structure were released by SOM in early 2021, updated renderings being revealed in 2023. Scott Rechler, CEO of RXR, anticipates the building will be complete by 2030.
350 Park Avenue	1,413 (431)	62	2032	350 Park Avenue has been quietly proposed by Vornado Realty Trust after a marketing brochure leaked renderings; the Foster and Partners-designed building would replace BlackRock's current headquarters after the company moves to 50 Hudson Yards in 2022. In January 2023, Bloomberg reported that Citadel intended to occupy roughly half the building's office space. In December 2023, the developer bought the air rights from the Roman Catholic Archdiocese of New York. The New York City Council unanimously approved the building on September 25, 2025.
360 Tenth Avenue	1,000 (305)	—	—	Class A office building proposed by property owner McCourt Global and designed by Skidmore, Owings & Merrill. Construction was planned to commence in 2024.
5 World Trade Center	917 (280)	80	—	New design unveiled in February 2021. Construction was anticipated to begin in 2024.
260 South Street Tower I	798 (243)	73	—	Approved by the City Planning Commission in December 2018.
260 South Street Tower II	748 (228)	67	—	Approved by the City Planning Commission in December 2018.
259 Clinton Street	730 (223)	62	—	Approved by the City Planning Commission in December 2018.
One Third Avenue	725 (221)	63	—	Approved by the City Council in 2018 and part of the Alloy Block development, One Third Avenue will include 583 apartments, retail, and office space. Upon completion, it will be the world's tallest Passive House.
10 West 57th Street	672 (205)	52	—	Ultra-luxury condominium tower proposed by Sheldon Solow; the former buildings on the site were under demolition as of May 2020. Demolition work was wrapping up by the end of 2024, and the site is now fully cleared as of December 2025.

=== Proposed ===
This table lists buildings proposed for construction in New York City that are expected to rise at least 650 feet (198 m) in height. For buildings whose heights have not yet been released by their developers, this table uses 50 stories as the cutoff.

Name	Height ft (m)	Floors	Notes
Port Authority Bus Terminal Office Tower 1	1,346 (410)		Part of phase 3 of the Port Authority Bus Terminal Redevelopment
100 Gold Street (Stage 2)	1,290 (393)	115	Mayor Eric Adams presented a rendering of a 2000-unit residential skyscraper at this site as part of his State of the City address. GFP Real Estate was selected to redevelop the site in December 2025. Project was upsized by the Mamdani Administration in September 2026.
77 West 66th Street	1,200 (365)	90	Possible residential supertall tower developed by Extell. If built, the skyscraper will surpass 50 West 66th Street and take its place as the tallest building in the Upper West Side. Demolition of the current site occupant is underway.
655 Madison Avenue	1,162 (354)	74	Designed by Beyer Blinder Belle and developed by Extell, the building is planned to yield 154 condominium units. The current site occupant, an early 1950s office building with 24 stories, is being demolished as of December 2025.
310 Greenwich Street	1,090 (332)	72	Vornado Realty Trust and Stellar Management have proposed a 1090-foot residential building designed by Morris Adjmi Architects for the site.
871 Seventh Avenue	1,130 (344)	71	Potential mixed-use supertall skyscraper, designed by Beyer Blinder Belle and developed by Extell. In addition to its 130 condominium units, the tower will also have 24,000 square feet of ground-floor retail space and a 55-vehicle parking garage.
247 Cherry	1,013 (309)	78	SHoP Architects building being developed by JDS Development Group. Initial plans were revealed in April 2016 and approved by the City Planning Commission in December 2018. As of 2022, the developer is facing legal challenges to the site.
PENN15	1,000 (305)	50	Initially proposed by Vornado before the 2008 financial crisis, the developer is still seeking an anchor tenant to justify construction as of 2024. Demolition work was underway in 2023, although, since early 2024, Vornado is still proposing covering the site the site with tennis courts and an event space. Its height has been reduced from 1270 to 1000 feet, but no construction date is certified. The building is only two blocks from the Empire State Building.
346 Madison Avenue	962 (293)	46	Joint venture between Japan's Mori Building Co., Ltd. and SL Green, announced on May 28, 2026. Demolition work underway as of July 2026.
Port Authority Bus Terminal Office Tower 2	926 (282)		Part of phase 3 of the Port Authority Bus Terminal Redevelopment
100 Gold Street (Stage 1)	901 (275)	78	Mayor Eric Adams presented a rendering of a 2000-unit residential skyscraper at this site as part of his State of the City address. GFP Real Estate was selected to redevelop the site in December 2025. Project was upsized by the Mamdani Administration in September 2026.
418 11th Ave	798 (243)	72	David Adjaye designed a proposal for the site, at 418 11th Avenue, for developer Don Peebles, referred to as the "Affirmation Tower". The request for proposal for which the plan was submitted was later revised by New York governor Kathy Hochul and now requires affordable housing. In 2024, a revised plan for the site from a partnership that does not include Peebles was submitted and approved. The newly proposed development, called HDSN, would include two towers with 1,349 residential units, a hotel, and retail space.
321 East 96th Street	760 (232)	68	Proposed by Vivmark Residential; will be the tallest building in East Harlem.
99 Hudson Boulevard	745 (227)	48	Proposed by Tishman Spyer back in 2019 as a 44-story tower. In 2026, the height and floor count has been increased and plans to begin construction in 2027

== Tallest destroyed or demolished ==
This table lists buildings in New York City that were destroyed or demolished and at one time stood at least 500 feet (152 m) in height.

Was the world's tallest building upon completion

Name	Image	Height ft (m)	Floors	Year completed	Year demolished	Notes
1 World Trade Center (original)		1,368 (417)	110	1971	2001	Destroyed in the September 11 attacks; stood as the tallest building in the world from 1970 until 1971.
2 World Trade Center (original)		1,362 (415)	110	1971	2001	Destroyed in the September 11 attacks.
270 Park Avenue		707 (215)	52	1960	2021	Also known as JPMorgan Chase Tower and formerly the Union Carbide Building. Demolition of the current building started in 2019, making it the tallest building in the world to be voluntarily demolished. The JPMorgan Chase Building topped out on the site in 2023 as the sixth-tallest building in New York.
Singer Building		612 (187)	41	1908	1968	Demolished to make room for One Liberty Plaza; stood as the tallest building in the world from 1908 until 1909. Tallest building ever to be demolished until the September 11 attacks, and tallest voluntarily demolished building in the world until 2019.
7 World Trade Center (original)		570 (174)	47	1987	2001	Destroyed in the September 11 attacks.
Deutsche Bank Building		517 (158)	39	1974	2011	Deconstructed due to damage sustained in the September 11 attacks.

== Timeline of tallest buildings ==
This lists buildings that once held the title of tallest building in New York City. Both Trinity Church and the Empire State Building have held the title twice, the latter following the destruction of the World Trade Center in the September 11 attacks. The Empire State Building was surpassed by One World Trade Center in 2012.

Was also the world's tallest building upon completion

Name	Image	Address	Years as tallest	Height ft (m)	Floors	Notes
Collegiate Reformed Protestant Dutch Church		Fort Amsterdam	1643–1846	Unknown	1	Demolished
Trinity Church		79 Broadway	1846–1853	279 (85)	1	
Latting Observatory (1853–1856)		42nd Street and Fifth Avenue	1853–1854	315 (96)	3	Height reduced by 75 feet (23 m) in 1854; burned down in 1856
Trinity Church		79 Broadway	1854–1890	279 (85)	1	
World Building (1890–1955)		73 Park Avenue	1890–1894	309 (94)	20 (Note: The floor count of the World Building has been disputed. Upon construction, the building was said to have up to 26 floors, but in recent years, it has been reported to have as few as 16.)	Demolished in 1955
Manhattan Life Insurance Building (1894–1964)		64–70 Broadway	1894–1899	348 (106)	18	Demolished in 1964
Park Row Building		13–21 Park Row	1899–1908	391 (119)	30	
Singer Building (1908–1968)		149 Broadway	1908–1909	612 (187)	47	Demolished in 1968
Metropolitan Life Insurance Company Tower		1 Madison Avenue	1909–1913	700 (213)	50	
Woolworth Building		233 Broadway	1913–1930	792 (241)	57	
Bank of Manhattan Trust Building (Note: This building was constructed as the Bank of Manhattan Trust Building, but is now more commonly known as 40 Wall Street and officially known as the Trump Building.)		40 Wall Street	1930	927 (283)	71	
Chrysler Building		405 Lexington Avenue	1930–1931	1,046 (319)	77	
Empire State Building		350 Fifth Avenue	1931–1971	1,250 (381)	102	
1 World Trade Center (1971–2001)		1 World Trade Center	1971–2001	1,368 (417)	110	Destroyed in the September 11, 2001 attacks
Empire State Building		350 Fifth Avenue	2001–2012	1,250 (381)	102	
One World Trade Center		1 World Trade Center	2012–present	1,776 (541)	104	

== Skylines ==
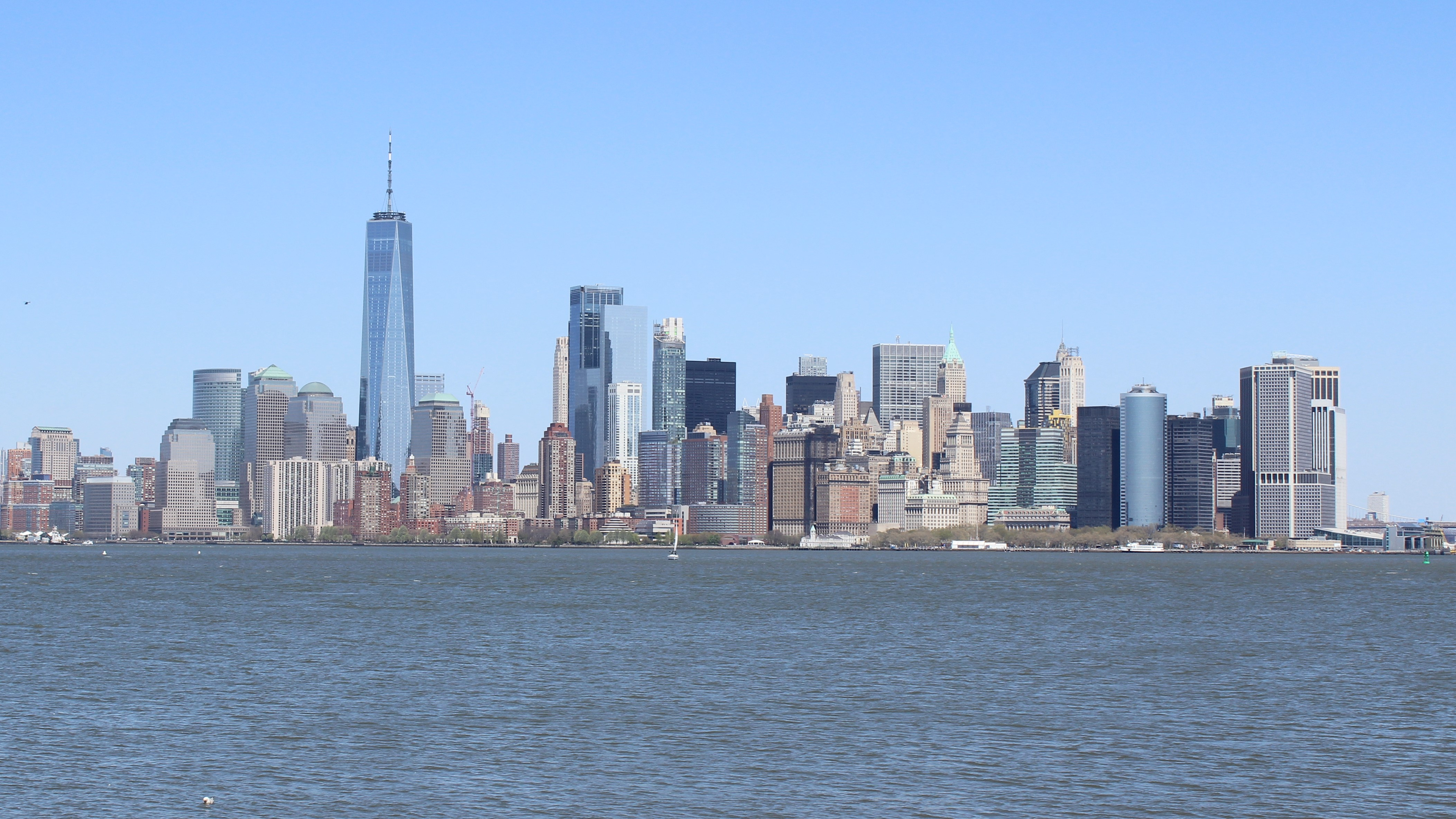
Lower Manhattan

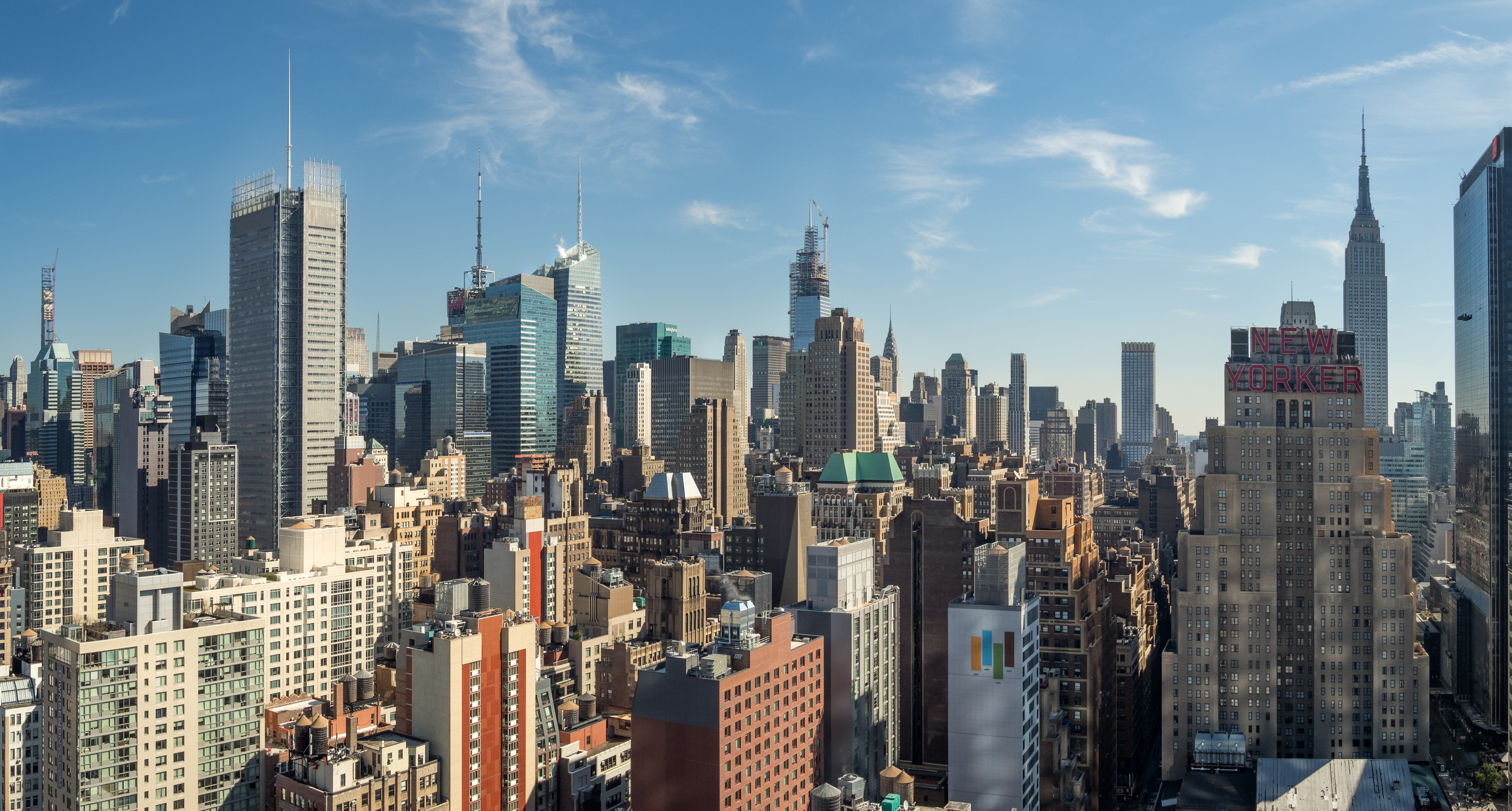
Midtown Manhattan

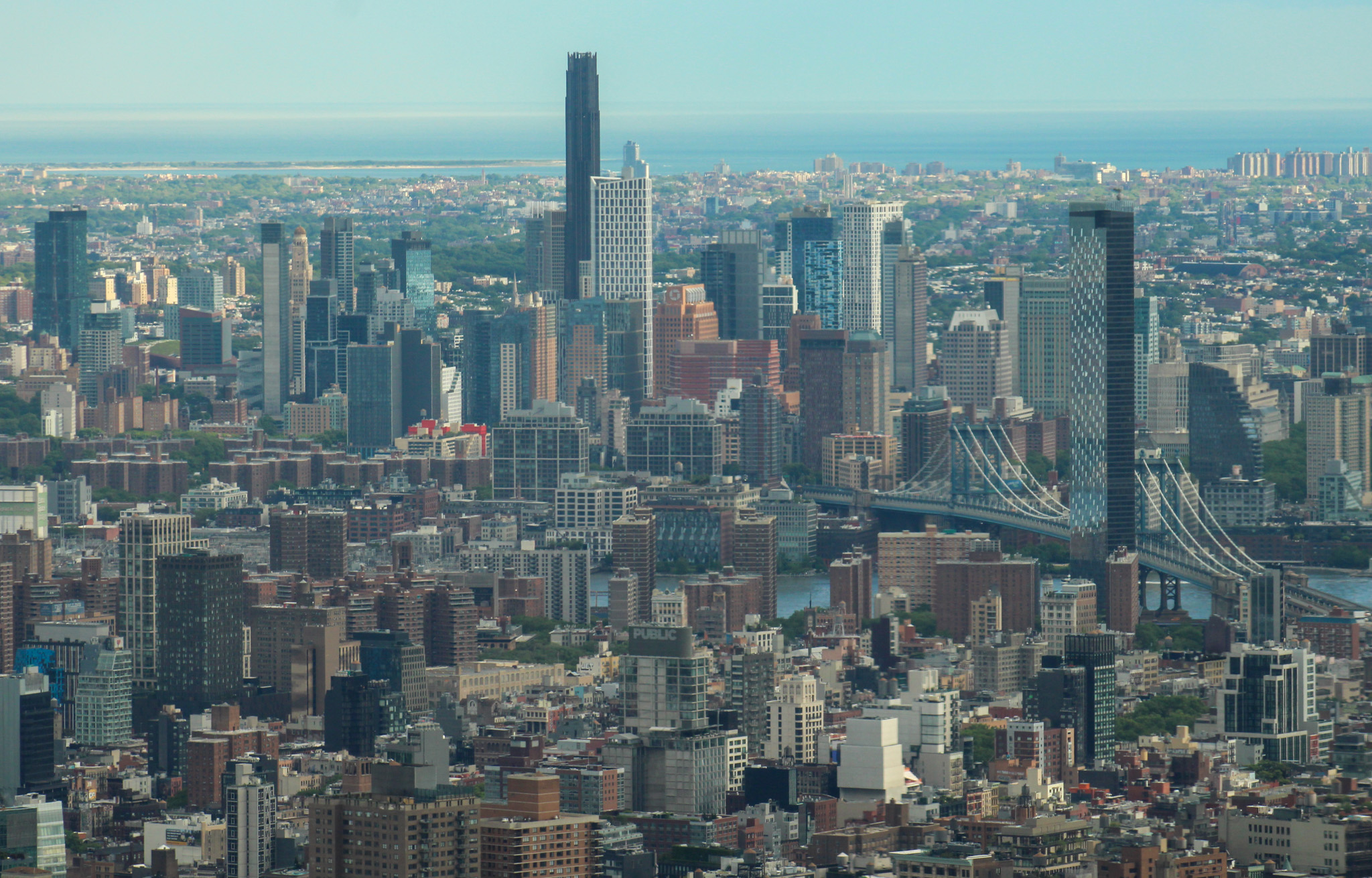
Downtown Brooklyn

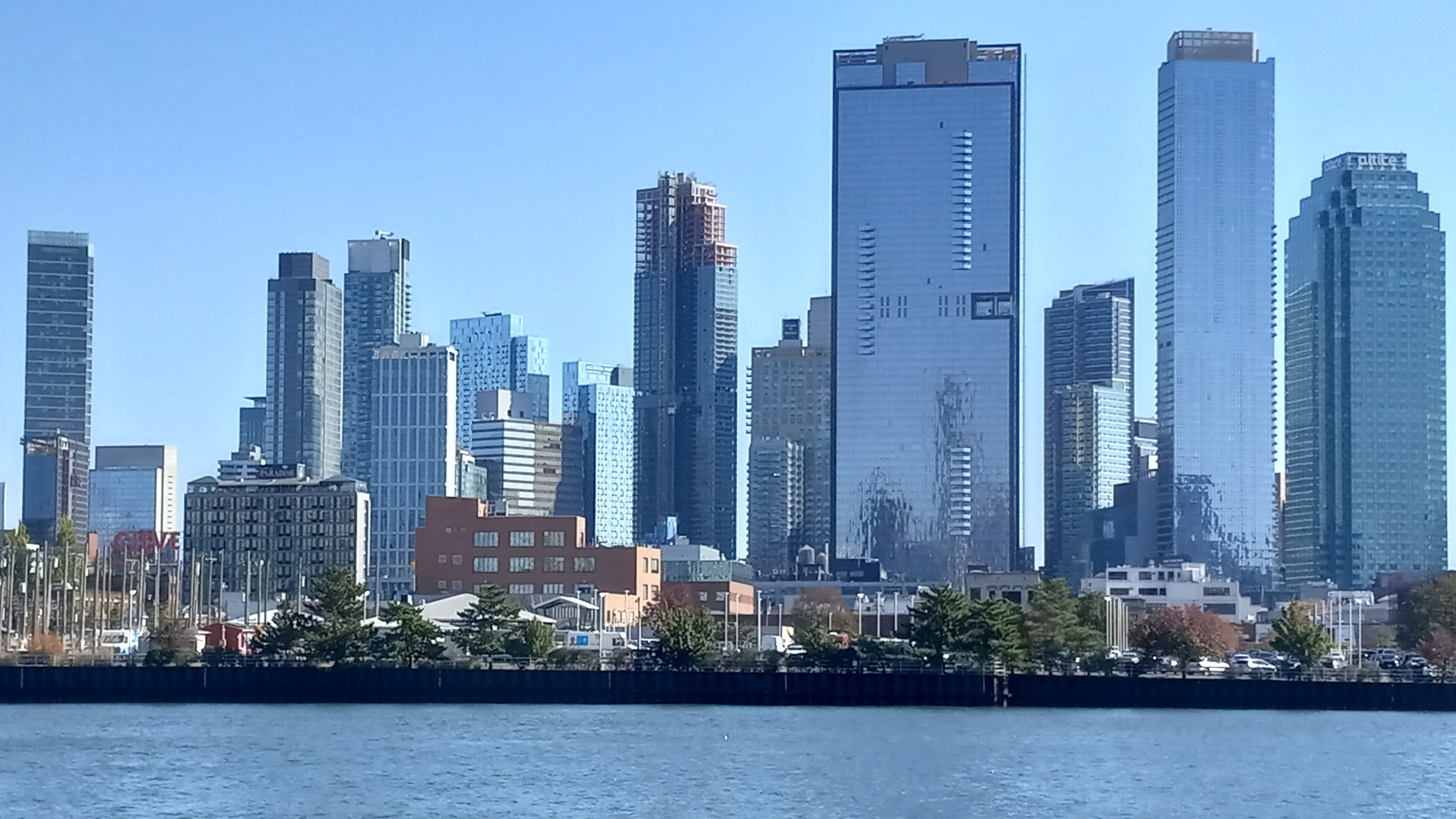
Long Island City

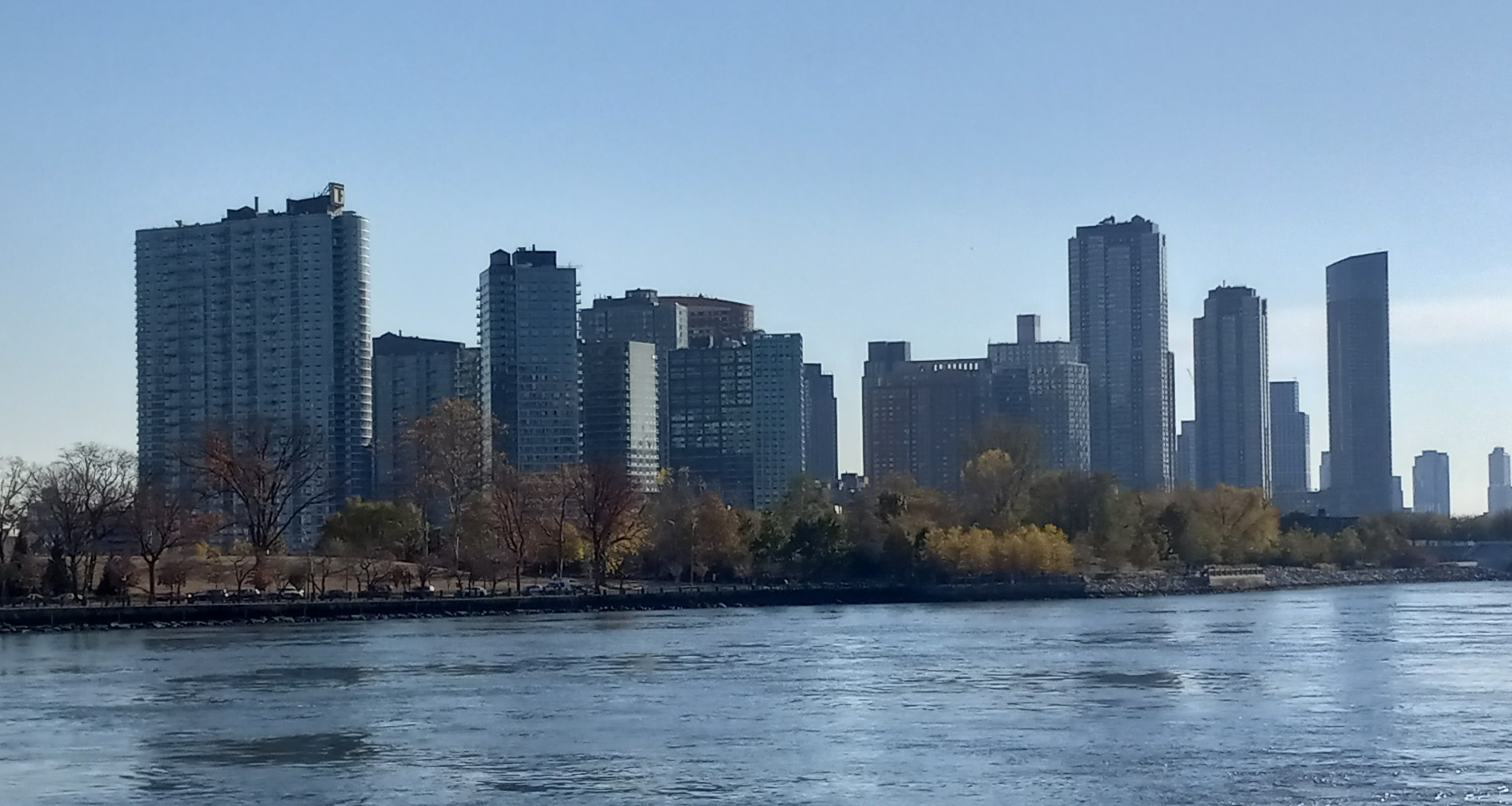
Hunter's Point South

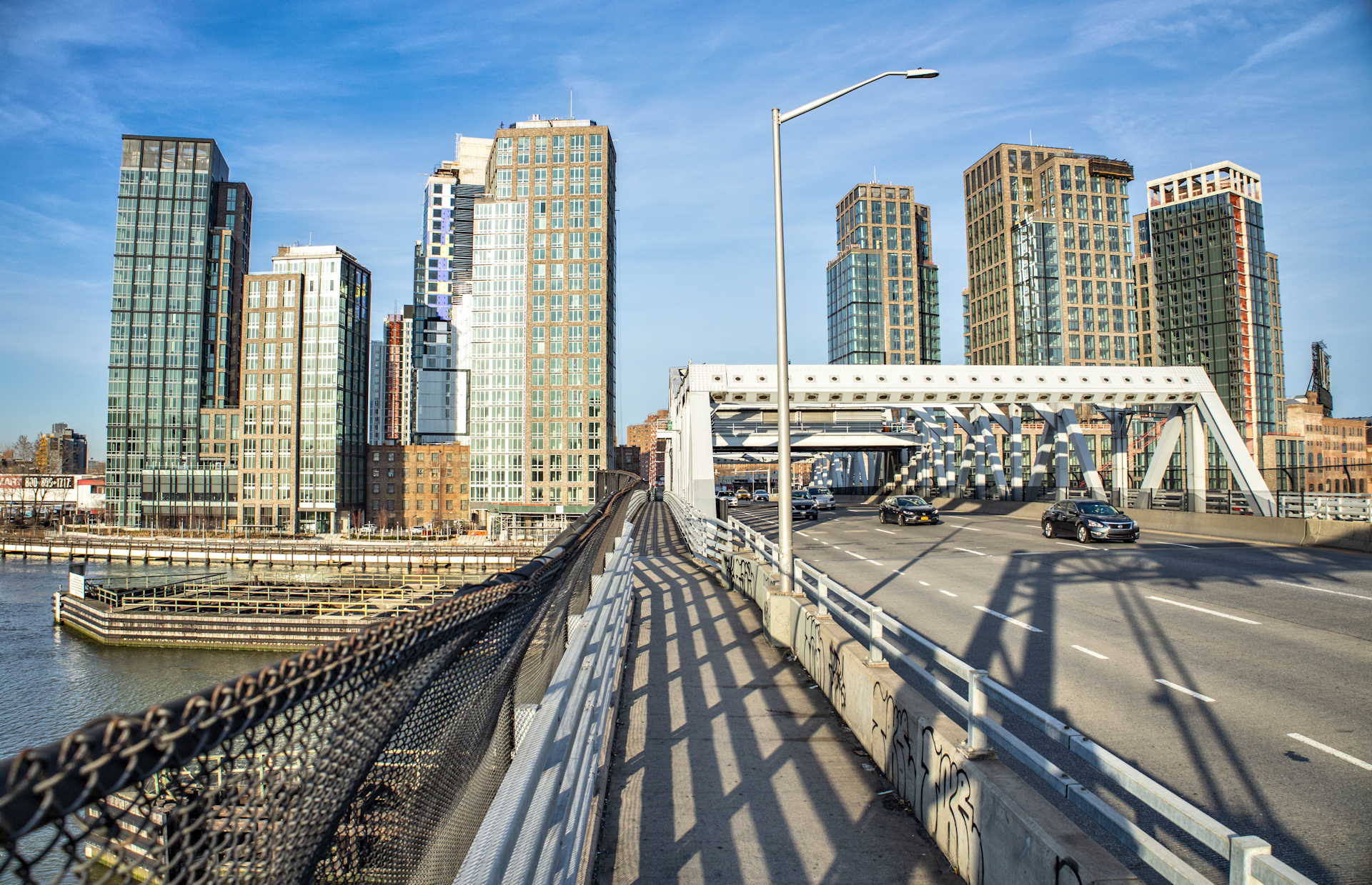
South Bronx

== See also ==
- Architecture of New York City
- List of cities with the most skyscrapers
- List of tallest buildings
- List of tallest buildings in the United States
- List of tallest buildings in Albany, New York
- List of tallest buildings in Brooklyn
- List of tallest buildings in Buffalo, New York
- List of tallest buildings in Jersey City
- List of tallest buildings in New Jersey
- List of tallest buildings in Queens
- List of tallest buildings in Rochester, New York
- List of tallest buildings in Upstate New York
- List of tallest buildings on Long Island
