= 130 William =

Residential skyscraper in Manhattan, New York

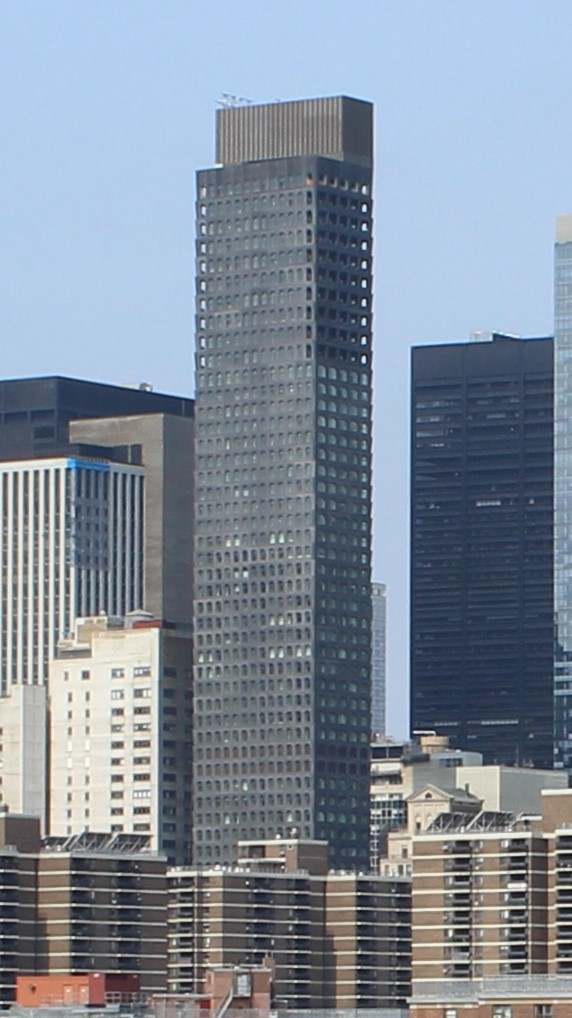
- 130 William in August 2021

General information
- Status: Completed
- Type: Mixed-use
- Location: 130 William Street; Manhattan, New York City, 130 William Street
- Coordinates: 40°42′33″N 74°00′22″W
- Construction started: 2018
- Completed: 2022

Height
- Roof: 800 ft (240 m)

Technical details
- Floor count: 66

Design and construction
- Architect: David Adjaye

130 William is an 800-foot-tall (240 m), residential high-rise tower located in the Financial District of Manhattan. The building was developed by Lightstone and designed by Ghanaian-British architect Sir David Adjaye as his first and only skyscraper design.

== History ==
Lightstone purchased the former 12-story office building at 130 William Street in May 2014 for $60 million after the previous owner Berkeley College defaulted on a mortgage from East West Bank. Eight months later, the company unveiled Hill West Architects' plans for a 50-story tall mixed-use building that would reach a height of 581 feet (177 m) and contain a hotel and 188 apartments. However, new plans filed in early 2017 removed the hotel portion and increased the building's size to its current height. The project name was Wall Street Tower until in 2017, when the name was changed to 130 William Street.

In March 2017, the project secured $305 million in financing and began construction. Facade installation began in October 2018. The building topped-out in May 2019.

Construction of 130 William was completed in June 2023.

== Architecture and design ==
130 William's custom hand-cast façade features large-scale arched windows and bronzed detailing. It rises approximately 800 feet (240 m) tall at 66 stories and consists of 242 residences and over 22,000 square feet (2,000 m^{2}) of amenities. The building incorporates a new public plaza, also designed by Adjaye, as well as over 20,000 square feet (1,900 m^{2}) of retail, both located at the building's base.

130 William is adjacent to the Fulton Center transit hub of the New York City Subway and to the South Street Seaport; it is also near the World Trade Center and the Brooklyn Bridge.

== Reception ==
The design of 130 William was met by mostly negative reviews from architectural critics.

Before construction was finished, James Gardner wrote in The Real Deal that "the most immediately striking thing about 130 William is its dark earth tones, which have become something of a signature style for Adjaye. But the hues make no sense in the context in this area of Lower Manhattan" and that the building resembles "something like an alien spaceship coupled with Rome’s famed Palazzo della Civiltà Italiana."

Justin Davidson writing for the Curbed called the building "So rough and lugubrious it appears to be in mourning," referring to the building's "high-end melancholy" he found too "extreme". He describes it more, saying "The pool and health club, with its low, black-painted vaults, black hardware, and walls covered in black mosaic tile, looks like it was designed for unspeakable, possibly painful activities. The apartments are cheery enough and flooded with light — but step from the dazzle into the crepuscular hallway and you feel like you’re staring into an elevator shaft."

In The New York Review of Books, Martin Filler wrote that "for some reason, arched fenestration never looks quite right on tall buildings" and that "130 William Street is no exception."

== See also ==
- List of tallest buildings in New York City
