= 360 Tenth Avenue =

Proposed skyscraper in Manhattan, New York

Coordinates: 40.7523°N 74.0004°W

- Interactive map of the 360 Tenth Avenue area

General information
- Status: Proposed

Height
- Roof: 1,000 ft (300 m)

Technical details
- Floor count: Unknown

360 Tenth Avenue is a proposed supertall office skyscraper in the Hudson Yards neighborhood of Manhattan in New York City. It is expected to be 1,000 ft (300 m) tall and contain 1,000,000 ft^{2} (93,000 m^{2}) of Class A office space. Construction is expected to commence in 2024.

== See also ==
- List of tallest buildings in New York City
