= 262 Fifth Avenue =

Residential skyscraper in Manhattan, New York

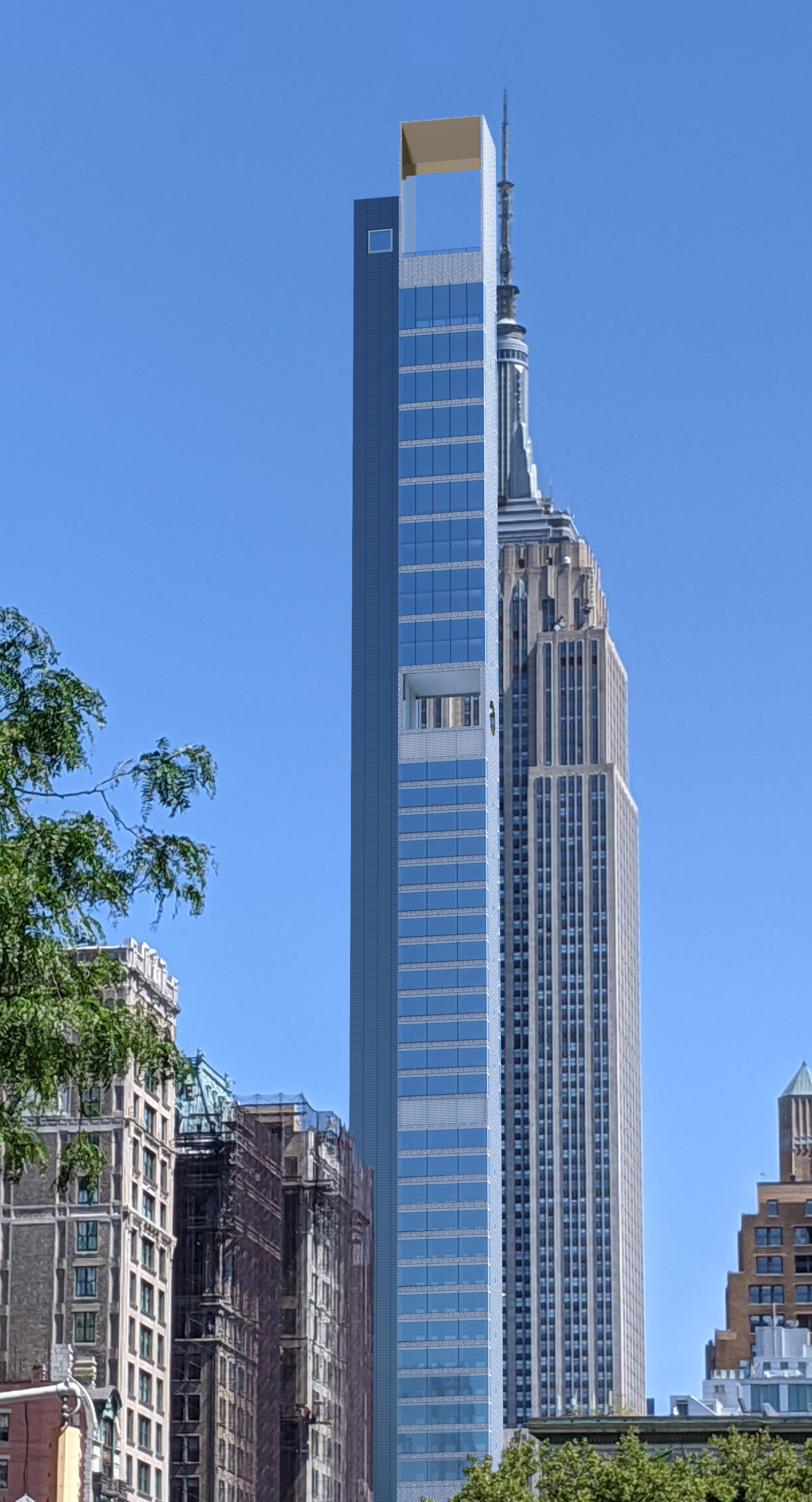
- Artist's impression

General information
- Status: Completed
- Classification: Residential
- Coordinates: 40°44′43″N 73°59′13.5″W

Height
- Height: 860 feet (260 m)

Technical details
- Floor count: 54

Design and construction
- Architect: Meganom
- Developer: Five Points Development

Website
- 262fifthavenue.com

262 Fifth Avenue is a residential skyscraper on Fifth Avenue in Manhattan, New York City. Five Points Development is developing the building, which is being developed by Boris Kuzinez and designed by Russian architectural firm Meganom. SLCE Architects is the executive architect. The structure is 860 feet (260 m) high, with 26 apartments across 54 stories.

Work on the site began in 2017 when the existing structures were demolished, though construction of the skyscraper's foundation did not begin until 2022. The building topped out in April 2024, and apartment sales began that December.

== History ==
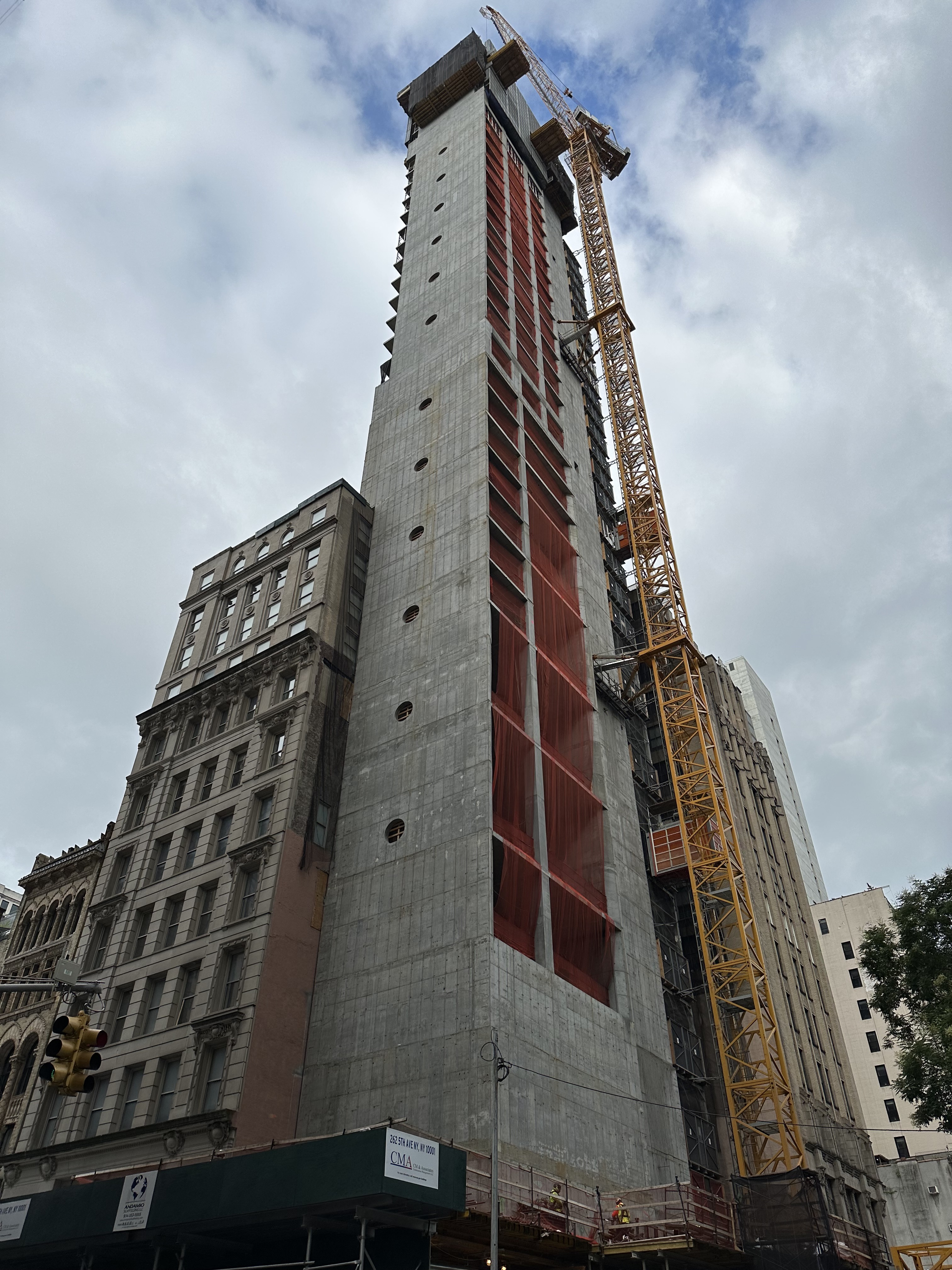
262 Fifth Avenue under construction in July 2023

Boris Kuzinez purchased the buildings at 260, 262, and 264 Fifth Avenue in 2015 and 2016 for a total of $101.8 million. Kuzinez also purchased air rights for $5.8 million. In September 2016, SLCE Architects applied to build a 54-story, 928-foot (283 m) structure on the site at 262 Fifth Avenue designed by Russian firm Meganom. Before receiving the commission to design 262 Fifth Avenue, Meganom had not designed a building in the United States. Five Points JV, L.P. acted as the representative of the site's owner.

By early 2017, Kuzinez was negotiating with Goldman Sachs to obtain a construction loan, but negotiations had stalled. At the time, there was decreasing demand for ultra-luxury residential skyscrapers in New York City. Kuzinez submitted plans for apartments to the New York City Department of Buildings (DOB) in the middle of that year. These plans tentatively called for 39 apartments, the largest of which was to be a three-story penthouse of 9,900 square feet (920 m^{2}). Demolition of the existing structure at 262 Fifth Avenue was completed by September 2017, and the DOB approved the skyscraper plans the following month. The plans called for as many as 41 apartments, with floors measuring 47 to 52 feet (14 to 16 m), though potential buyers would be able to combine units. The structure itself would rise 1,009 feet (308 m), making it a supertall skyscraper. Nikolai Fedak, writing for New York YIMBY, compared plans to incorporate 260 Fifth Avenue into the new building's base to plans for 111 West 57th Street.

In January 2019, New York YIMBY reported that work on the building was apparently not progressing. Kuzinez sold the site at 260 Fifth Avenue to Amir Loloi for $52.5 million in mid-2021. Work had resumed by November 2021 with the start of excavation. In 2022, work began on the structure's foundation. Between August and December 2022, the planned height of the structure was reduced from 1,043 to 860 feet (318 to 262 m). A representative for Kuzinez indicated in mid-2023 that the project had been downsized from 41 to 26 apartments. That November, Madison Realty Capital and Cottonwood Group lent the project a combined $180 million.

The building topped out in April 2024. In December 2024, the Attorney General of New York's office gave Kuzinez permission to begin selling the units, and Kuzinez began marketing five of the apartments. Meanwhile, work continued on the building's facade.

== Usage ==
Most of the building's floor slabs measure 45 by 45 feet (14 m × 14 m) across. The elevators and staircases are grouped within a mechanical core on the western end of each story. The building measures 860 feet (260 m) tall, giving it a height-to-width ratio of approximately 19:1; thus, it is classified as a pencil tower. The building includes 139,168 sq ft (12,929.1 m^{2}) of residential space, split over 26 apartments. The apartments span roughly 3,200 square feet (300 m^{2}) on average. At least one of the apartments will be a four-story unit. There will also be 10,850 sq ft (1,008 m^{2}) of retail space and a rooftop infinity pool.

== Reception ==
The building received significant public criticism during its construction for obstructing views of the Empire State Building from many viewpoints south of 28th Street, including almost all of Madison Square Park, which had previously been a popular vantage point for tourists. The building's design was also criticized. In 2023, Christopher Bonanos of Curbed wrote that "262 Fifth, even more than the others, truly does look as though the consulting architect were Eberhard Faber", in reference to the Eberhard Faber pencil company. Commentators also wrote about the small number of units relative to the building's height. These criticisms raised questions about New York's zoning laws and whether high-rise construction should be more strictly regulated in the city.

== See also ==
- List of tallest buildings in New York City
