= 19 Dutch =

Residential skyscraper in Manhattan, New York

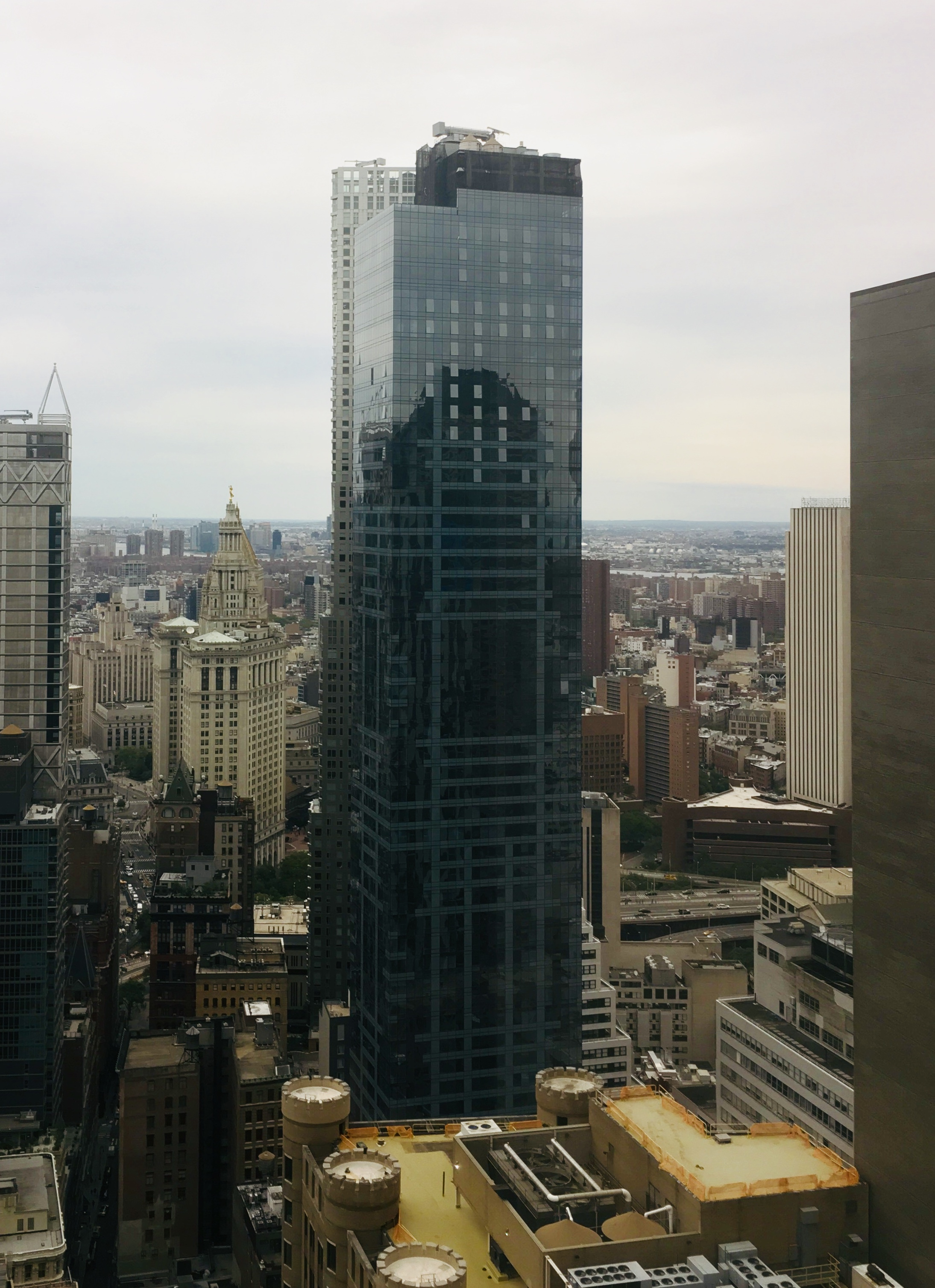
- Interactive map of the 19 Dutch area

General information
- Status: Completed
- Type: Mixed-use
- Location: 118 Fulton Street, New York, NY 10038
- Coordinates: 40°42′35″N 74°00′27″W
- Completed: 2019
- Landlord: Bozzuto Group

Height
- Roof: 758 feet (231 m)

Technical details
- Floor count: 63
- Floor area: 454,957 square feet (42,266.9 m^{2})

Design and construction
- Architects: Gerner, Kronick + Valcarcel, Architects
- Main contractor: Times Square Construction, Inc.

Website
- www.19dutch.com

19 Dutch is a 63-story residential skyscraper located in Manhattan’s Financial District, New York City. Completed in 2019, it stands at 758 feet (231 meters) and houses 483 residential units, along with approximately 8,100 square feet of retail space on the lower levels.

The building was developed by Carmel Partners and was designed by GK+V, with SLCE Architects as the architect of record. The building contains 482 units and retail space on the first several floors. In February 2018, Carmel began leasing out the 97 affordable apartments. Carmel placed the building for sale in 2022, and Amancio Ortega, the founder of Zara, agreed in July 2022 to buy 19 Dutch via his holding firm Pontegadea for about $500 million.
