= 100 West 37th Street =

Under-construction skyscraper in Manhattan, New York

Casoni
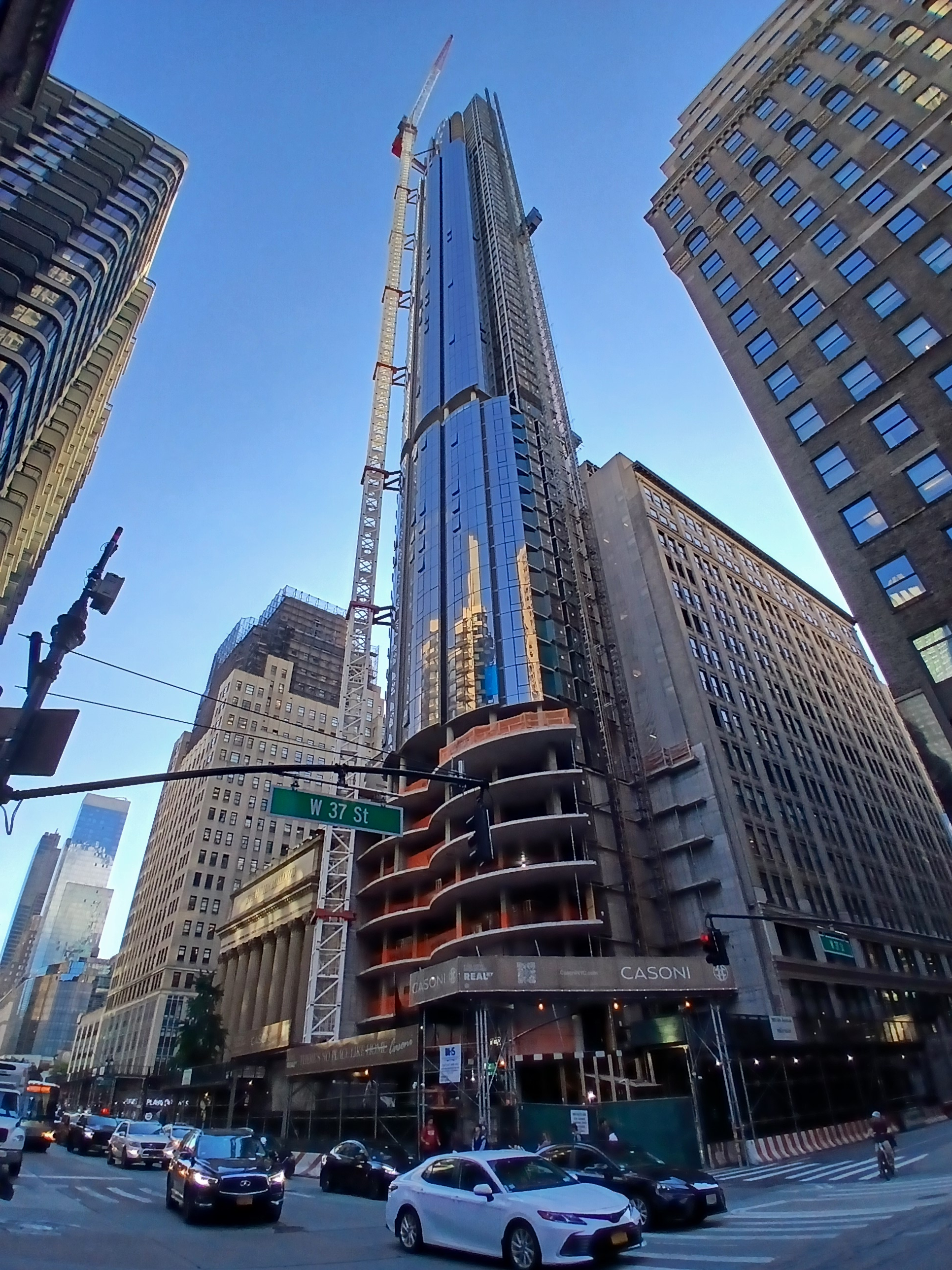
- 100 West 37th Street under construction in September 2025
- Interactive map of the Casoni area

General information
- Status: Topped-out
- Type: Residential
- Location: 100 West 37th Street; New York, New York, United States
- Coordinates: 40°45′06.0″N 73°59′12.3″W

Height
- Height: 743 feet (226 m)

Technical details
- Floor count: 70

Design and construction
- Architect: C3D Architecture
- Developer: Sioni Group

Casoni (also known as 100 West 37th Street and 989 Sixth Avenue) is an under-construction residential skyscraper at the corner of 37th Street and Sixth Avenue in Midtown Manhattan, New York City, United States. The building was developed by Sioni Group and will be 785 ft (239 m) tall and have 70 stories.

== Description ==
The building is at the southwest corner of Sixth Avenue (Avenue of the Americas) and West 37th Street in the Garment District of Midtown Manhattan, New York City. The nearly rectangular land lot covers 8,041 square feet (747.0 m^{2}), with a frontage of 98.75 feet (30.10 m) on Sixth Avenue and a depth of 100 feet (30 m); there is a rectangular cutout at the lot's northwest corner. Immediately to the south is the Greenwich Savings Bank Building, while Bryant Park and the New York Public Library Main Branch are a few blocks north.

Casoni was designed by the architectural firm C3D Architecture for clients Sioni Group and RPY 989 LLC. The tower will be 743 feet (226 m) tall and have 68 floors. The building's form is divided into four sections. The lowermost section is a cylindrical, glass-clad mass that is similar in height to the Greenwich Savings Bank Building. The upper stories are clad with metal and glass, with balconies facing northeast toward the intersection of 37th Street and Sixth Avenue.

Inside are 311 residential condominiums, each spanning 991 square feet (92.1 m^{2}) on average. The smallest apartments are studio apartments, while the largest units have three bedrooms. There are also 86,817 square feet (8,065.6 m^{2}) set aside for commercial uses and an amenity space spanning 25,000 square feet (2,300 m^{2}) across two floors. The 23rd floor, 58th floor, and roof have exterior terraces. To maximize usable space, the building's structural core is located on the western boundary of the site, near the middle of the city block.

== History ==
The site previously contained two structures—a one-story building at 993 Sixth Avenue and an adjacent 21-story building at 989–991 Sixth Avenue—owned by real-estate investors Isaac Chetrit of the Chetrit Group and Ray Yadidi of the Sioni Group. They had paid $49 million for 989–991 Sixth Avenue in 2007. The partners further paid $54.3 million in 2015 for 993 Sixth Avenue, which at the time was planned to be replaced with a hotel. The same year, they bought the air rights above the adjacent Greenwich Savings Bank Building. Chetrit and Yadidi were theoretically allowed to build a skyscraper of up to 80 stories and 375,000 square feet (34,800 m^{2}) of space. Chetrit hired Kohn Pedersen Fox to design the tower in 2017. Simultaneously, Chetrit was considering selling the site, even though the developers were already demolishing 993 Sixth Avenue.

In December 2021, Chetrit and Yadidi submitted plans to the New York City Department of Buildings to develop a 68-story building at 989–993 Sixth Avenue, to be designed by architect of record C3D Architecture. The next year, the Sioni Group negotiated to borrow $350 million to build the skyscraper. At the time, Sioni was preparing to demolish the building at 989–991 Sixth Avenue. However, it was unable to receive financing from traditional banks due to high interest rates. In 2023, Sioni borrowed $47 million for the building's construction from Valley National Bank. Renderings for the tower were released that August, and the site had been cleared by November.

By summer 2024, the two basement levels were constructed and construction of the ground floor began. The building had reached the height of the neighboring high-rise buildings by the end of the year. Work had reached 25 stories in January 2025, and the structure had been built to half its final height by that March. In April 2025, Sion received a $275 million construction loan for the project, and the firm hired Real New York as the building's brokerage.

== See also ==
- List of tallest buildings in New York City
