= Bozzuto Group =

Real estate company based in Greenbelt, Maryland, US

- Type: Privately held company
- Industry: Real estate
- Founded: 1988
- Founders: Thomas S. Bozzuto, John Slidell, Rick Mostyn and Bernie Lubcher
- Headquarters: Greenbelt, Maryland, United States
- Key people: Toby Bozzuto, Tom Bozzuto
- Services: Real estate development
- Website: bozzuto.com

The Bozzuto Group is a real estate company. Bozzuto has four main divisions—Bozzuto Management Company, Bozzuto Construction Company, Bozzuto Development Company, and Bozzuto Homes Inc. The company has developed, acquired, and built more than 45,000 homes and apartments. Currently, it manages more than 70,000 apartments and 2.2 million square feet of retail space along the East Coast between Miami and Boston, in the Northeast and Chicago. Its headquarters are in Greenbelt, Maryland. It was subsidized by Prince George's County, Maryland in 2013.

== History ==
Tom S. Bozzuto and his three partners John Slidell, Rick Mostyn, and the late Bernie Lubcher founded the company in 1988.

In 2013, Tom’s son Toby Bozzuto took over as Chief Executive Officer and President.

In 2014, he received the developer of the year award from the Maryland Building Industry Association. According to The Washington Post, the company has developed more than 50,000 homes and apartments since its inception.

Bozzuto has been recognized by many national and regional organizations. For five consecutive years, from 2015 to 2019, Bozzuto has been named Top Property Management Company for Online Reputation by Multifamily Executive Magazine and J Turner Research. In 2016, the National Association of Home Builders (NAHB) named Bozzuto "Multifamily Development Firm of the Year" at their Pillars of Industry Awards.

== Lawsuits ==
In 2025, Bozzuto settled a class action lawsuit from 2023 that accused the company of colluding with competitors to artificially raise rent prices by utilizing algorithms provided by the software firm RealPage.
