= Sven (building) =

Residential skyscraper in Queens, New York

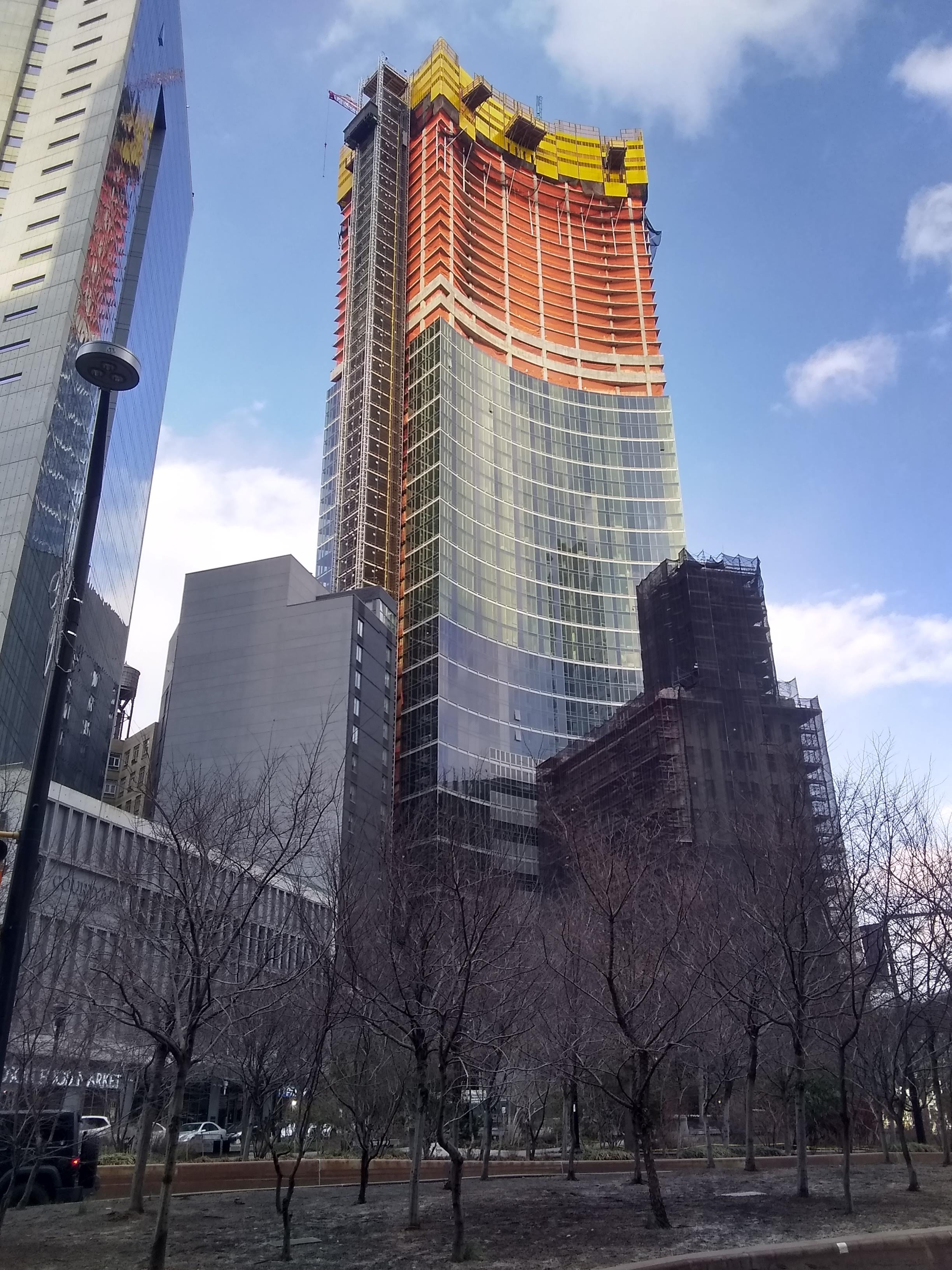
- Under construction in February 2020
- Former names: Queens Plaza Park

General information
- Status: Completed
- Type: Residential
- Location: 29-59 Northern Boulevard; Long Island City, Queens, New York
- Coordinates: 40°45′01″N 73°56′11″W
- Construction started: 2018
- Completed: 2021
- Opening: 2021

Height
- Roof: 755 ft (230 m)

Technical details
- Floor count: 71
- Floor area: 978,000 square feet (90,900 m^{2})

Design and construction
- Architect: Handel Architects
- Developer: Durst Organization

Sven (originally known as Queens Plaza Park) is a residential building located at 29-59 Northern Boulevard (next to Queens Plaza) in the Long Island City neighborhood of Queens, New York City. At 762 feet (232 m) tall, Sven is the third-tallest building in Queens behind Skyline Tower and The Orchard, as well as one of the tallest buildings in New York City outside of Manhattan.

The building was one of several that were planned on Queens Plaza following a 2001 rezoning. Sven was first planned as a hotel, then a condominium, and finally a 930-foot (280 m) supertall skyscraper before the plans were finalized in 2016. The structure topped out during June 2020, and developer Durst Organization began renting apartments in late 2021.

The development incorporates the Chase Manhattan Bank Building, a 14-story clock tower and office building erected in 1927 as the first skyscraper in the borough of Queens. Designed by Morrell Smith for the Manhattan Company (later Chase Bank), it was the borough's tallest office building until the Citicorp Building was finished in 1990. In 2015, the Chase Manhattan Bank Building was designated as an official city landmark by the New York City Landmarks Preservation Commission. It was then incorporated into the design plans for Sven, where it became the building's commercial base.

== Description ==
Sven is located at 29-59 Northern Boulevard (next to Queens Plaza). (Note: There are numerous possible addresses for this building.: The building is addressed as either 29-27 Queens Plaza North or 29-37 Queens Plaza North.; This portion of Queens Plaza North is also referred to as 41st Avenue, so the addresses may run from 29-27 to 29-37 41st Avenue.; Due to the nature of Queens addresses, there is a hyphen between the closest cross-street (the first two numbers) and the actual address (the last two numbers).) It occupies a trapezoidal plot bounded by 41st Avenue to the west, Queens Plaza North (also 41st Avenue) to the south, Northern Boulevard to the east, and 40th Drive to the north. The main residential tower is 762 feet (232 m) tall. When completed in 2021, the tower will be the second tallest building in Queens after Skyline Tower. At Sven's base, there are shops in the Chase Manhattan Bank Building, a 14-story office building and clock tower described as "the first skyscraper in Queens". Sven's residential component was originally slated to be the tallest building in Queens, though the Skyline Tower would be taller if completed first. (Note: The Skyline Tower (previously the Court Square City View Tower) was completed in October 2019. Two months later, Sven was only half completed.)

The project is officially called Sven by its developer, The Durst Organization, a name that appears to have been in use since at least late 2019.

=== Residential skyscraper ===
The new development consists of 958 rental apartments, 288 of which are affordable. Amenities include an outdoor pool, a 20,000-square-foot (1,900 m^{2}) gym, a private library for residents, co-working space, a children's playroom and a demonstration kitchen. Adjacent to the tower, a 0.5-acre (2,000 m^{2}) public park sits at the base of the building. The entire facade is made of glass. The concave southern facade, facing Queens Plaza, curves inward. The interiors of the residences were designed by Selldorf Architects. The building's concave exterior design by Handel Architects has drawn comparisons to London's 20 Fenchurch Street.

=== Chase Manhattan Bank Building ===
Chase Manhattan Bank Building
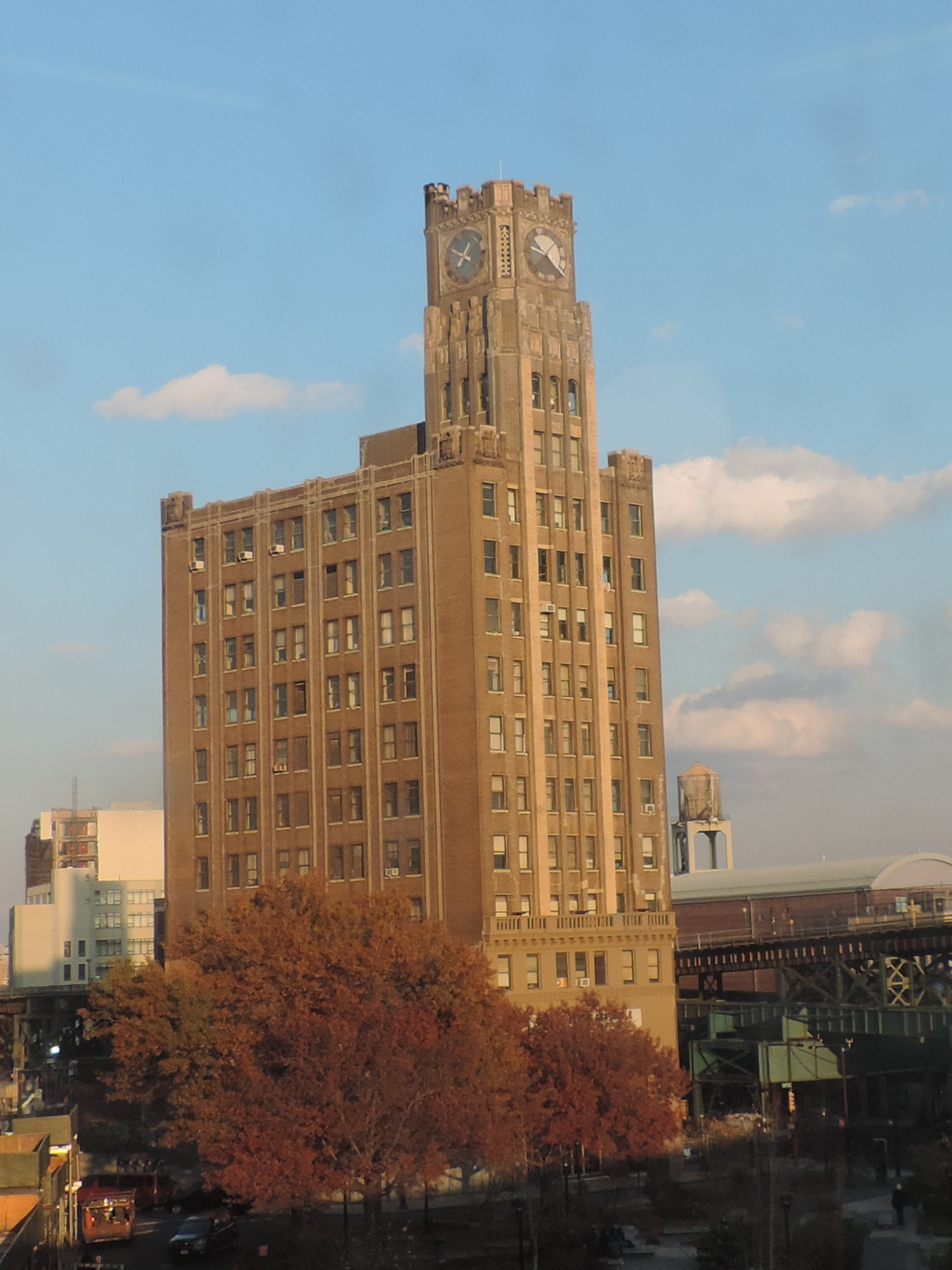
- Prior to addition of residential towers
- Alternative names: Bank of the Manhattan Company Building, Queens Clock Tower Building

General information
- Status: Completed
- Architectural style: Neo-Gothic
- Location: 29-27 41st Avenue, Long Island City, New York
- Coordinates: 40°45′00″N 73°56′11″W
- Completed: 1927
- Cost: $1,000,000

Height
- Architectural: 207 feet (63 m)

Chase Manhattan Bank Building, also known as the Queens Clock Tower and the Bank of the Manhattan Company Building, is located at the southern end of the plot containing Sven. It contains 11 stories of offices as well as a 3-story clock tower. The building was designed by Morrell Smith, who had also designed other Manhattan Company branches, and until 1990, it was the tallest commercial building in Queens. It was designated as an official city landmark in 2015. As part of Sven's construction, the former Chase Manhattan Bank Building was converted into the residential development's retail base, with more than 50,000 square feet (4,600 m^{2}) of commercial space.

The building contains a facade of buff brick and Indiana Limestone. It is arranged into a base, a shaft, and a capital, similar to the parts of a column. The base is made of limestone and originally included a banking hall. The southern facade, facing Queens Plaza, included three vertical architectural bays that each contained windows under a relief. The entrance portico, made of masonry, was topped by a Gothic Revival entablature with a depiction of Oceanus, a Greek god that was also used as the Manhattan Company's icon, as well as a glazed transom. A metal sign with the bank's name was located above the first floor. These were later replaced by a utilitarian double-height glass wall. Inside was an elevator lobby, where there was access to the elevators that served the upper floors. There was also a bank vault in the basement.

On the upper stories, the southern facade is divided into three vertical bays, with buff brick standing out against the brown-brick facade. This facade contains a 2-3-2 window arrangement, with three windows in the center bay and two windows in each of the outer bays. The clock tower, described before its construction as a landmark that was easily visible from other boroughs, continues above the center bay. It contains clocks on all four faces, each with Roman numerals. This made the Chase Manhattan Bank Building the second building on Queens Plaza to contain a clock tower, the first being the adjacent Brewster Building in 1911. The clocks are non-winding Telechron clocks added by the Brooklyn-based Electime Company. Above the "XII" mark on each face were neo-Gothic-style cast-stone reliefs. Other features on the tower include carvings of gargoyles, as well as a "castellated turret, copper windows and granite shields". Adjacent to the tower, there was formerly a rooftop sign, which faced east and advertised the Manhattan Company.

== History ==
=== Bank building ===
Queens Plaza was built to accommodate the connection of the Queensboro Bridge to Queens Boulevard, which opened in 1909. The plaza soon experienced an increase in real estate development. The Queensboro Plaza station, a large two-level subway hub, opened in 1916–1917, further bringing development to the area. Queens Plaza came to be characterized as a "a new downtown", supplanting the Hunters Point section of Long Island City in that regard. From the 1920s through World War II, Queens Plaza served as the location for many factories and warehouses, some of which later became office buildings, as well as a financial hub with several banks. The Manhattan Company was one of the banks that moved to Queens Plaza. Formed in 1799, it was originally based at 40 Wall Street in Manhattan (later occupied by a skyscraper at the same site). The Manhattan Company's expansion into Queens started in 1910 with its purchase of a minority interest in the Bank of Long Island, followed ten years later by the merger of the two companies. At the time of the merger, the Manhattan Company had 13 Queens locations, including the two-story 5 Skillman Place, which later became the site of the Bank of the Manhattan Company Building.

The company drew up blueprints for a new office and bank building at 29-27 Queens Plaza North, and submitted them to the Queens Bureau of Buildings in 1924. These plans, announced in October 1925, called for a 14-story structure, comprising 11 stories of offices and a 3-story clock tower on top. When the plans were announced, The New York Times said that the building would be erected on a 60-by-100-foot (18 by 30 m) lot, while the Brooklyn Daily Eagle said the lot was 50 by 75 feet (15 by 23 m). According to the Belcher-Hyde atlas of 1928, the lot was later expanded to 50 by 110 feet (15 by 34 m), with a one-story rear annex. The building was constructed by Charles T. Wills, Inc., and finished at a cost of $1 million.

When completed in May 1927, the Manhattan Company's building at 29-27 Queens Plaza North was dubbed "the first skyscraper in Queens". Until the 1990 completion of One Court Square, 29-27 Queens Plaza North was the tallest commercial building in Queens. However, the Realty Construction Corporation Office Building, one block north of the Manhattan Company Building, had more office floors when completed in 1928. The Manhattan Company had bank vaults in the basement of 29-27 Queens Plaza North, and also occupied the ground and mezzanine floors within the base. At the time of completion, the Manhattan Company Building had the most office space of any building in Queens, but it was also 85% occupied; many of the tenants had not previously done business in Queens. In a 1928 ceremony, the Queensboro Chamber of Commerce recognized the Manhattan Building as the best building in Queens.

A rear annex, consisting of between one and two stories, was built in two sections: a 10-foot (3.0 m) portion to the north, completed in 1928, and an extension 20 feet (6.1 m) north by 15 feet (4.6 m) east, finished in either 1931 or 1933. Following the Manhattan Company's rebranding into Chase Manhattan, the original ornament was removed from the base of the structure and a glass facade was added by about the mid-1960s. The branch operated through 1984 and was sold four years later; the rooftop sign was taken down by 2004. It remained abandoned from the bank's closure through 2012, when the vaults and clock tower were temporarily used for site-specific art. For nine months between 2013 and 2014, the Center for Holographic Arts occupied the building.

=== Residential skyscraper construction ===
==== Initial plans ====
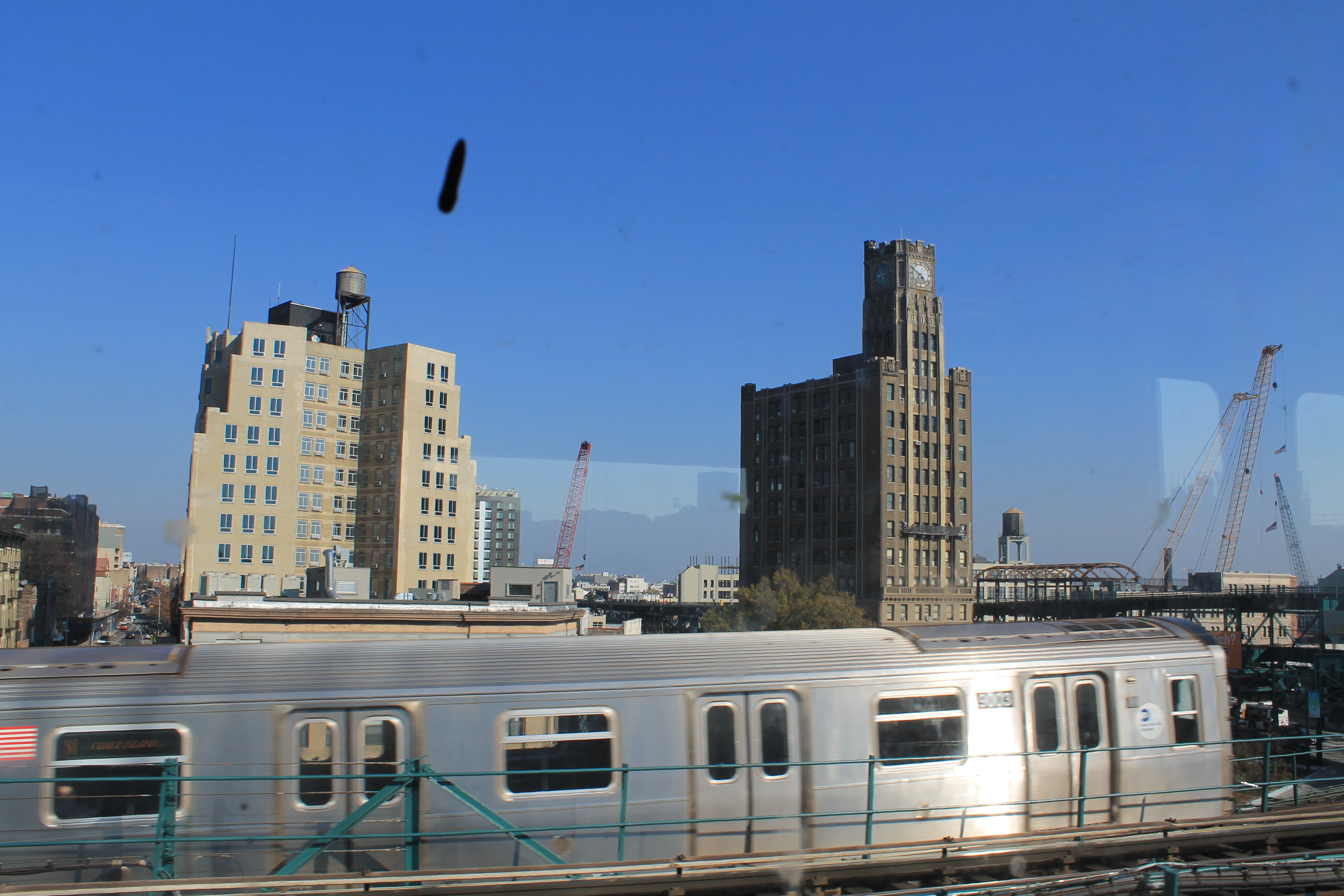
Sven site (right), viewed from a subway train

As part of a 2001 rezoning, much of Long Island City was rezoned to allow high-rise residential development. The site of the Chase Manhattan Bank Building was originally planned to contain a 16-story hotel, but economic downturn caused the developers to enter bankruptcy. Steve Cheung then purchased the location for $8.3 million, intending to build a 30-story condominium tower. The new building was slated to be the first supertall skyscraper in New York City outside Manhattan. The building would have been residential, split between rentals and condos. It would have spanned 900,000 square feet (84,000 m^{2}) and contain 800 units.

Amid rumors of development, preservationists lobbied for making the Bank of the Manhattan Company building an official landmark. In 2014, property Markets Group and Hakim Organization purchased the clock tower building from Cheung for $30 million and the surrounding land for $46.3 million, adding to fears that the building might be torn down.

In March 2015, PMG and Hakim planned for a 930-foot (280 m), 77-story tower on the block surrounding the bank building. This height was made possible by the transfer of unused air rights from the Metropolitan Transportation Authority's East Side Access tunneling project, which ran right underneath the proposed development. At the time of the proposal, the land for the development was mostly owned by the city and various government agencies. The MTA sold the land above the East Side Access tunnel to PMG and Hakim in March 2015. Unused air rights were also taken from the Chase Manhattan Bank Building, at the southern portion of the site. Without such air rights, the height of the new development would be capped at 38 stories, since the proposed size of the building was four times greater than what was allowed under the area's height and zoning restrictions. In May 2015, the New York City Landmarks Preservation Commission unanimously voted to designate the original 11-story bank building and clock tower as city landmarks.

==== Revised plans and construction ====
In 2016, the Durst Organization purchased the site for $175 million from PMG with intentions to develop a residential tower. Kevin Maloney and Kamran Hakim, who respectively headed PMG and Hakim Organization, stated that they did not "have the horsepower" to finish the project; according to The New York Times, Maloney had an almost-due acquisition loan on the Chase building and could not get a construction loan for the rest of the project without equity. Durst retained the Queens Plaza Park name even after the purchase was completed. A downsized design was announced in April 2018, calling for a 710-foot-tall tower with 63 stories. The new residential tower would curve around the preexisting bank building at its base.

The building's foundations were completed in December 2018. The construction of the foundations was difficult because of the need to work around the Chase Manhattan Bank Building to the south, and a northern curved wall following the retaining wall of the excavation pit for the East Side Access tunnel boring machines now concealed by Sven Park. Later the same month, the development received a $360 million construction loan from M&T Bank. Work on the curved facade commenced in October 2019, and two months later the project was reported to be over halfway completed. The developers also planned to restore the four clocks on the Chase Manhattan Bank Building, a project that was expected to be completed in late 2020. The residential tower topped-out during June 2020.

Durst hosted an official opening ceremony for the development, which had been renamed Sven, in early 2021. However, the developer did not begin leasing the 958 residential units until that November. Durst announced plans for the public park at Sven's base in March 2022; at the time, the park was supposed to open in early 2023. The next month, Finback Brewery leased some of Sven's retail space, becoming the building's first commercial tenant. By mid-2022, half of the market-rate units had been leased. but the retail space was not occupied. In early 2024, the Durst family considered selling the building for up to $850 million. Ultimately, Affinius Capital bought a stake in the building in mid-2024; the transaction placed the building's value at over $700 million.

== See also ==
- List of tallest buildings in New York City
- List of tallest buildings in Queens
- List of New York City Designated Landmarks in Queens
