= 461 Fifth Avenue =

Office skyscraper in Manhattan, New York

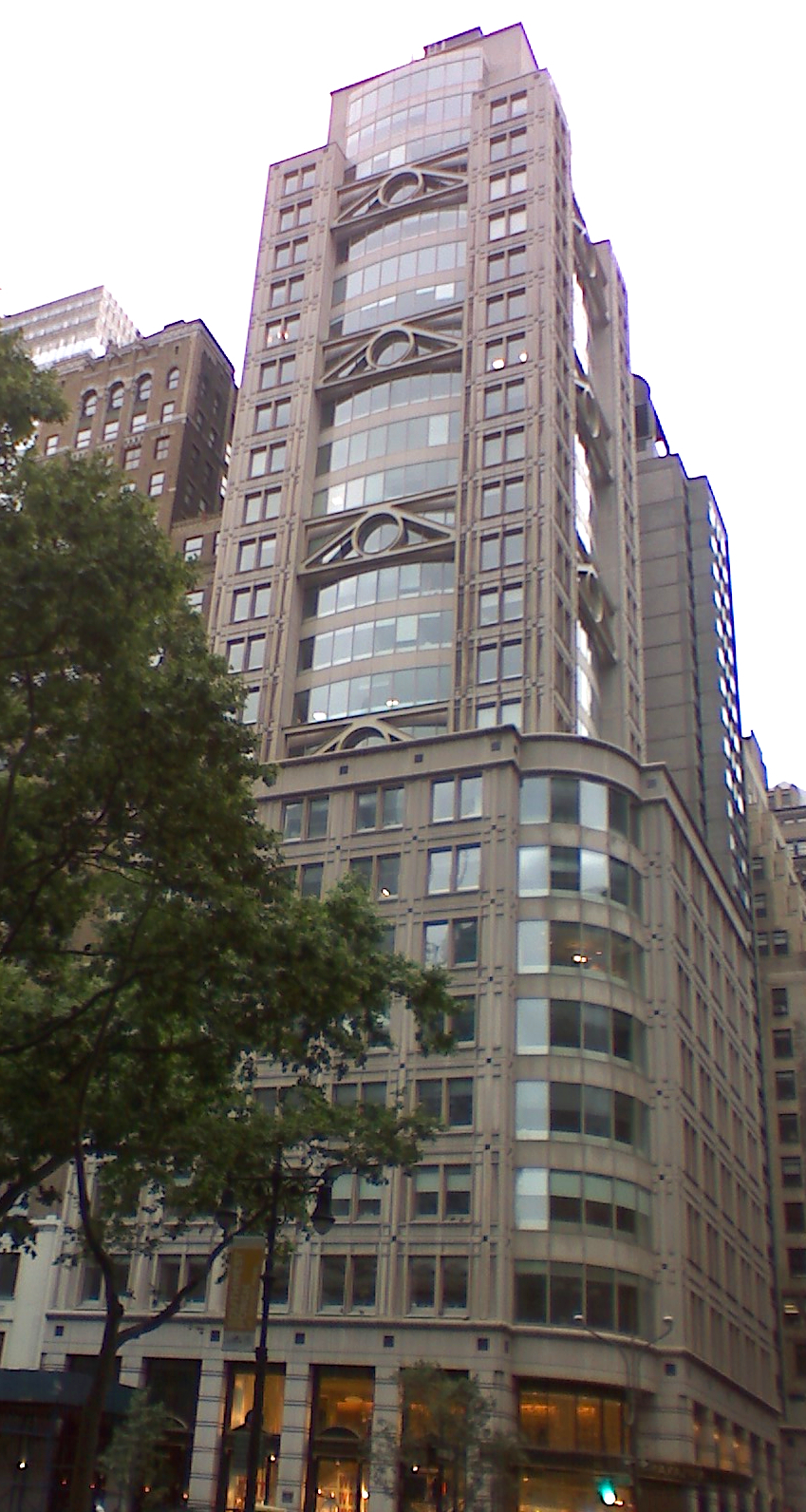
- Interactive map of the 461 Fifth Avenue area

General information
- Type: Office and retail
- Location: New York, NY
- Coordinates: 40.7523°N 73.9815°W
- Construction started: 1988
- Completed: 1989
- Owner: SL Green Realty

Height
- Roof: 376 ft (115 m)
- Top floor: 335 ft (102 m)

Technical details
- Floor count: 28
- Floor area: 200,000 sq ft (19,000 m^{2})

Design and construction
- Architect: Skidmore, Owings & Merrill
- Developer: Mitsui Fudosan, London & New York Estates Corporation, and Colonial Property Group

References
- website

461 Fifth Avenue is a 28-story skyscraper in Midtown Manhattan, New York City, at the northeast corner of Fifth Avenue and 40th Street. The building was constructed in 1988 by the Mitsui Fudosan development group and designed by Skidmore, Owings & Merrill.

== History ==
In the late nineteenth century, 461 Fifth Avenue was the residence of the Misses Furniss, who were known for hosting musicals and other social functions. They had acquired the address from a J. M. Bixby sometime after 1873.

Sometime between 1911 and 1915, the private house was replaced with an eleven-story office building, which in 1945 was renovated to become a Lane Bryant store. By 1988 the Lane Bryant building was demolished.

The current structure was built in 1988 by a Japanese-lead development group using a design by Raul de Armas of Skidmore, Owings & Merrill. Within a year of completion, the building had a 90% occupancy rate and had spurred a building boom in the Fifth Avenue area. By 1992 it was fully leased. The first floor shopping level was occupied by a Pier 1 Imports until 2007, when it was leased to BCBGMAXAZRIA.

The building was sold to its current owner, SL Green Realty, in 2003 for $62.3 million.

== Architecture ==
The building uses modern materials, creating a stone-finish look, as well as a setback at the base, which is at the same height as older buildings in the neighborhood. The building is also noted architecturally for its combination of a 10-story 19th-century base, which mirrors nearby older buildings, and an 18-story post-modern tower.

The exterior uses a pre-cast concrete finish to mimic the appearance of limestone and has a copper mansard roof similar to other buildings in the area.
