= One Court Square =

Office skyscraper in Queens, New York

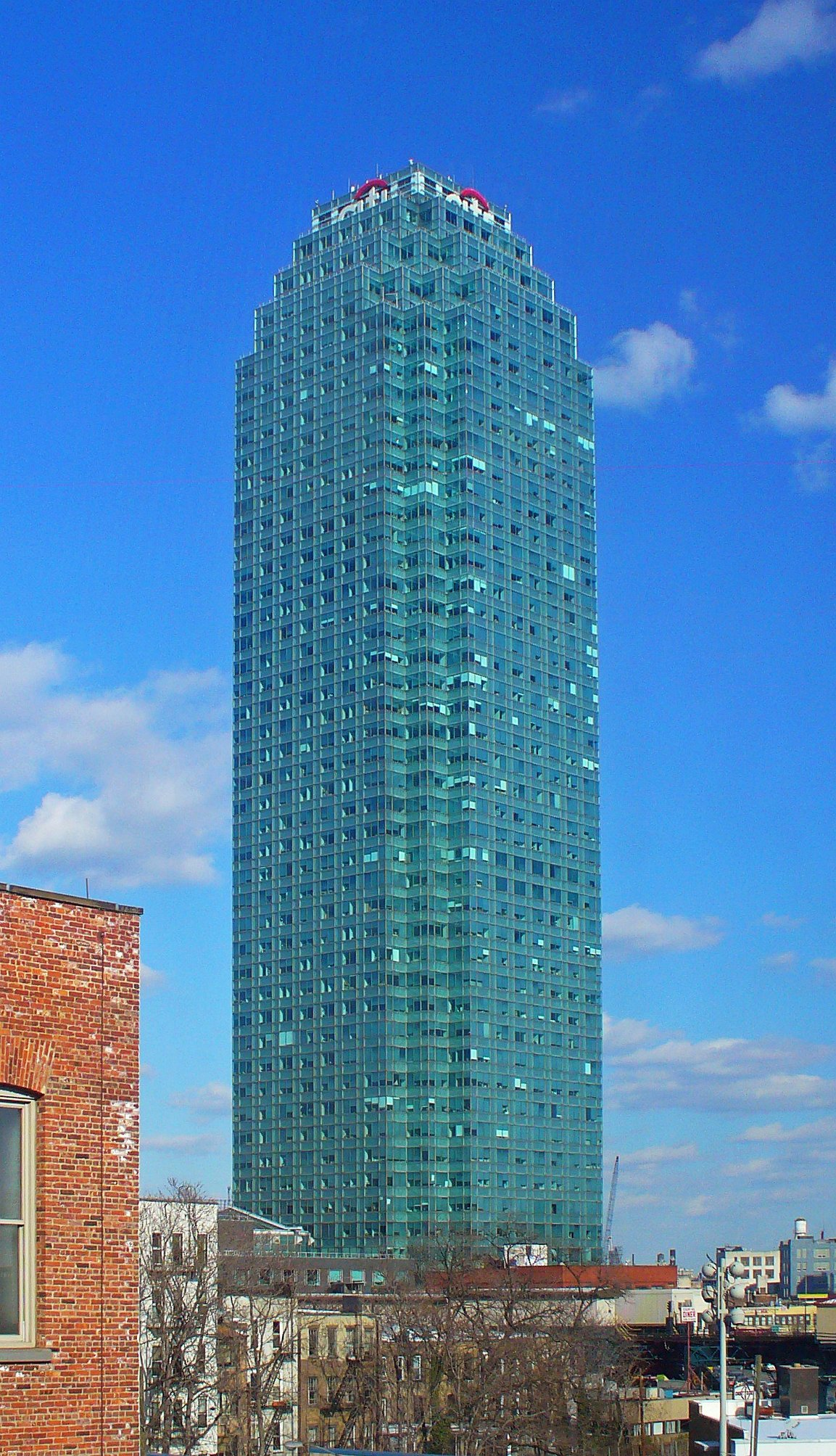
- Facade of 1 Court Square in February 2007
- Interactive map of the One Court Square area

General information
- Type: Office
- Coordinates: 40°44′49.5″N 73°56′38″W
- Completed: 1989; 37 years ago

Height
- Roof: 673 ft (205 m)

Technical details
- Floor count: 50
- Floor area: 1,400,000 sq ft (130,000 m^{2})

Design and construction
- Architect: Skidmore, Owings, and Merrill

One Court Square, also known as the Citicorp Building or the Citigroup Building, is a 50-story, 673-foot (205 m) office tower in Long Island City, Queens, across the East River from Manhattan in New York City, United States. It was completed in 1989 and designed by Skidmore, Owings & Merrill for Citigroup. The building was the tallest in Queens from its completion until the topping out of Skyline Tower in 2019, and for many years was the only skyscraper in Long Island City. It is now home to telecommunications firm Optimum Communications, whose logo adorns the top of the building, among other tenants.

== Design ==
One Court Square was designed by Raúl de Armas of Skidmore, Owings and Merrill and is owned by Savanna. The building has a green-tinted glass-wrapped facade, and rises a height of 673 feet (205 m) and 50 stories above ground. (Note: Some sources state 48 floors, or 53.) It has no setbacks until near the top, where it culminates in a pyramidal shape. The interior contains 1.4 million square feet (130,000 m^{2}) of rentable space. Its official address is 2501 Jackson Avenue.

The tower had been the tallest building in New York state outside of Manhattan, and the tallest building on Long Island, for 30 years. In 2019, the building was surpassed by the Brooklyn Point Tower and the Skyline Tower, becoming the third tallest building on Long Island and the second tallest building in Queens. Later, in 2021, it was also surpassed in Queens by Queens Plaza Park, which rises to 755 feet (230 m).

It is distinguished from the Citigroup Center in Manhattan, which is across the street from Citigroup's former main headquarters at 399 Park Avenue. The buildings are one stop apart on the New York City Subway's IND Queens Boulevard Line (E, F, and <F> trains); Citigroup Center is near Lexington Avenue–53rd Street, while One Court Square is right above Court Square–23rd Street, the next station east.

== History ==
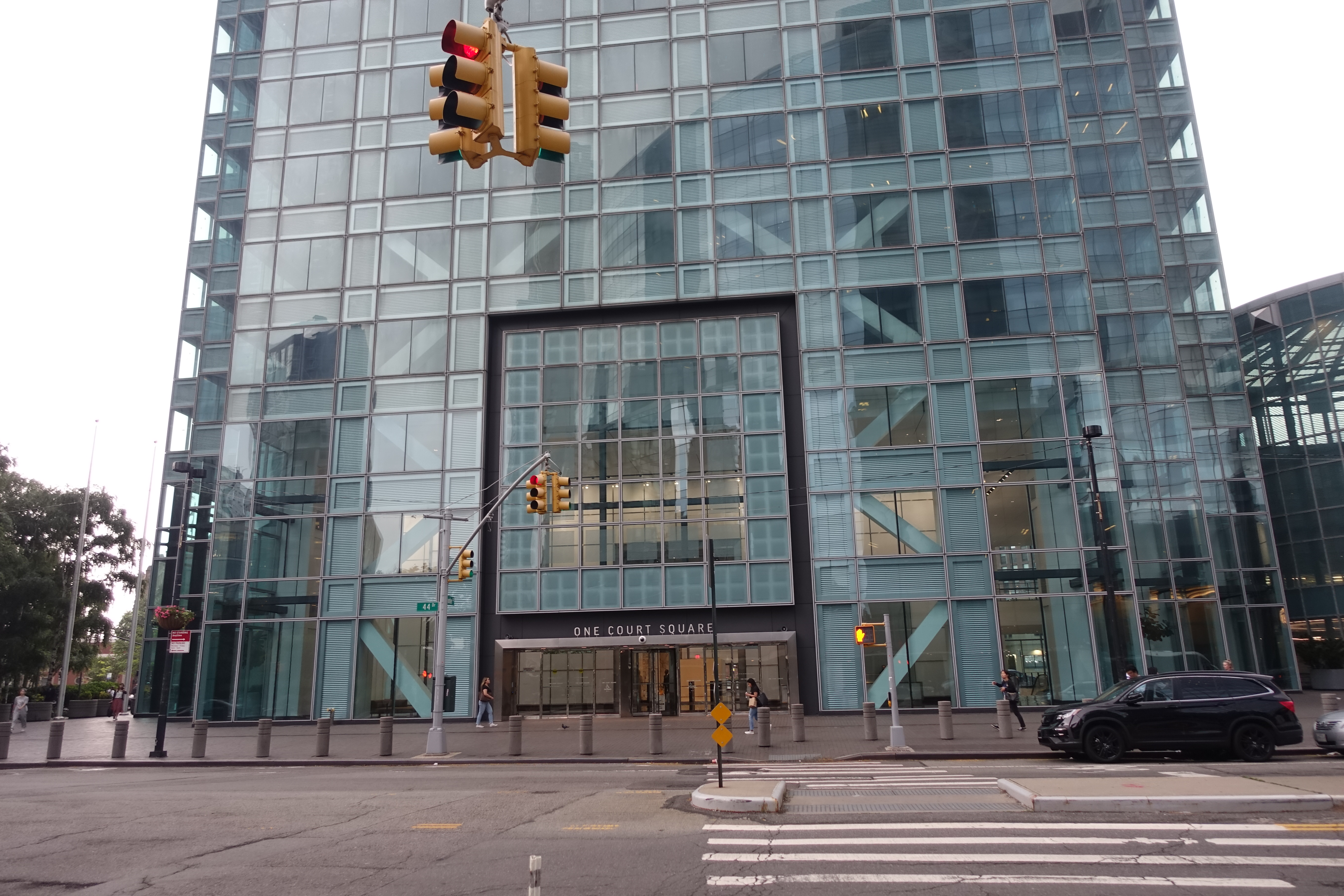
Entrance to the building

Citicorp, the largest bank in the United States at the time, announced plans to build an office tower in Long Island City in Queens in 1985. It was commissioned by the bank to supplement its nearby headquarters at Citicorp Center in Manhattan, and partly financed by the sale of more than 30 floors at Citicorp Center – a deal The New York Times described as "unusual". Because of its proximity to LaGuardia Airport, the plans for the tower were reviewed by the Federal Aviation Administration. The project was approved by the New York City Planning Commission in 1986, and construction began by 1987. Turner Construction was the lead contractor, and Skidmore, Owings and Merrill was the architectural firm. The construction site was occupied by a parking lot at the time, and was previously the site of a hospital.

The tower, officially known as One Court Square, opened in 1989 as the tallest building in the borough, surpassing the North Shore Towers in Glen Oaks. It cost $250 million. The development benefitted from city subsidies, including tax incentives and concessions on utilities, that aimed to persuade Manhattan firms considering a move to New Jersey to stay in the city. The tax breaks amounted to $97 million over 13 years. In exchange, Citicorp funded a $8.5 million improvement to the nearby Court Square–23rd Street station and created a 16,000 square feet (1,500 m^{2}) plaza for public use. It also built a 750-car parking garage nearby. Citicorp initially intended to lease part of the building, but eventually decided to occupy the entire space itself. 4,000 employees were expected to work in the building upon completion. A year later, its tax-assessed value was $114 million, making it the most valuable building in the borough.

At the time, the tower stood alone in a mainly industrial district; The New York Times described it in 2009 as "marooned amid a sea of low-lying warehouses and auto repair shops", and a contemporary review of the building noted that because of its isolation, "we perceive this tower with greater intensity than almost any other skyscraper in the city." The reception in the neighborhood was mixed: many residents feared it would spur overcrowding and rent increases, while businesses were pleased with the prospects for further economic development in the neighborhood. Five years later, the area was little changed.

Citigroup sold the building in 2005 to Reckson Associates Realty Corporation for $470 million, while maintaining a 15-year lease. A second building, Two Court Square, was constructed for Citigroup on an adjacent lot in 2007, though plans for a third building were scrapped and a commercial district that the city envisioned would coalesce around the new construction did not materialize, in part due to the Great Recession.

In 2012, Brooklyn real estate investors Joel Schreiber and David Werner purchased One Court Square for $481 million from Stephen L. Green's SL Green and JPMorgan Asset Management. In 2014, it was purchased by Savanna Realty. In 2020, the Citi logo was removed from the building and replaced with a logo of telecommunications company Altice USA (now Optimum Communications), whose headquarters had been in the building since 2017. Citi's lease expired in the same year.

In 2021, Consolidated Edison performed a $5 million retrofit of the building's HVAC systems for greater energy efficiency, described as the largest such retrofit of an office building in the company's history.

== Tenants ==
WNYZ-LD (also known as Voice of NY Radio Korea) broadcasts from the top of the building, as do various low power television stations.

Since 2017, the building has housed the headquarters of Optimum on its top floors. In 2018 the building was selected to provide up to 25 floors to Amazon as part of one of its three Amazon HQ2 locations. However, the Amazon HQ2 location in New York City was later canceled. As of 2023, Centene leased 500,000 square feet (46,000 m^{2}), and the New York City School Construction Authority was to occupy 350,000 square feet (33,000 m^{2}) across 11 floors starting in 2024.

For 30 years, the Queens Library operated a branch on the ground floor of the building, paying a nominal rent of $1 a year. It left the building when its original lease expired.

== See also ==
- List of tallest buildings in New York City
- List of tallest buildings in Queens
