= Chris Jiashu Xu =

Chinese businessman

- Born: Xu Jiashu; 1967 (age 58–59); Yangzhou, China
- Occupations: Founding Partner, United Construction & Development Group.

Chinese name
- Traditional Chinese: 徐家樹
- Simplified Chinese: 徐家树
Transcriptions
Standard Mandarin
- Hanyu Pinyin: Xú Jiāshù

Chris Jiashu Xu (Chinese: 徐家树; born in 1967) is a Chinese-American real estate developer. He is the founder and president of United Construction & Development Group, through which he developed Skyline Tower, the 2nd tallest skyscraper in Queens, New York City, and in all of New York State outside of Manhattan from 2019 until 2021.

== Early life ==
Xu Jiashu was born in Yangzhou, China in 1967, and immigrated to the United States together with his family at the age of 18.

== Career ==
While seeking opportunities as a new immigrant to the United States, Xu decided to go into business. He initially banded together with several friends to perform housing-related work, and subsequently went on to become the owner of a plumbing and heating distributor in Queens, New York by age 24.

After purchasing the real estate upon which his plumbing business was located, Xu was motivated to explore opportunities in real estate, and formally entered the business in 1996, bringing on board his younger brother, George Xu, in 1999. In the years that followed, the Xu brothers went on to develop, operate, and manage more than two million square feet of commercial, residential, industrial and retail space. In the 2000s, Xu served as President of the New York Chinese Business Association.

The brothers, who initially built together under the moniker C&G Empire Realty, split in 2014 over differences in real estate development philosophy, and George Xu founded Century Development Group, deciding to focus on one project at a time, while Chris desired to juggle multiple development projects at United Construction & Development Group. They continue to work together on various projects, and have maintained a similar focus on luxury condominiums and hotels in areas such as the Chinese immigrant enclave of Flushing, Queens, where both Chris and George have worked on similar projects, such as dueling 210-room hotels. Chris is also a managing partner of real estate private equity firm, New Land Capital.

Besides the United States, Chris Xu has partnered with firms in Hong Kong, Taiwan, and Mainland China to fund and develop his properties. Xu is considered one of the most active developers in Queens, having purchased two Queens-based properties valued at $103 million and $70 million in the first half of 2023 alone.

== Skyline Tower ==
Xu built the largest skyscraper in the New York City borough of Queens, the Skyline Tower in Long Island City. The development site, containing approximately 780,000 buildable square feet, was purchased in 2015 from Citigroup, and subsequently refinanced with a $100 million loan from Bank of China in 2016.

By mid-2018, the project had secured over half a billion dollars from lenders, which by that time had included JP Morgan Chase and a consortium of other banks. Construction on the site began in 2017 and it is projected to go on the market in 2021, with condominiums priced from $500,000 to $4 million. The building topped-out in October 2019.

In July 2022, ninety buyers of units within Skyline Tower filed a complaint with the New York Attorney General that the building's success had been exaggerated to prospective buyers, citing year-end financial statements displaying only 42 percent occupancy versus the 60 percent occupancy claimed by the building's sales and marketing agent. The brokerage disputed their assertion, stating that the 60 percent figure included units under contract. The same complaint also noted delayed repairs and other construction issues, including a lack of soundproofing and incomplete punch list items.
