= Citylights (building) =

Residential building in Queens, New York

Citylights at Queens Landing

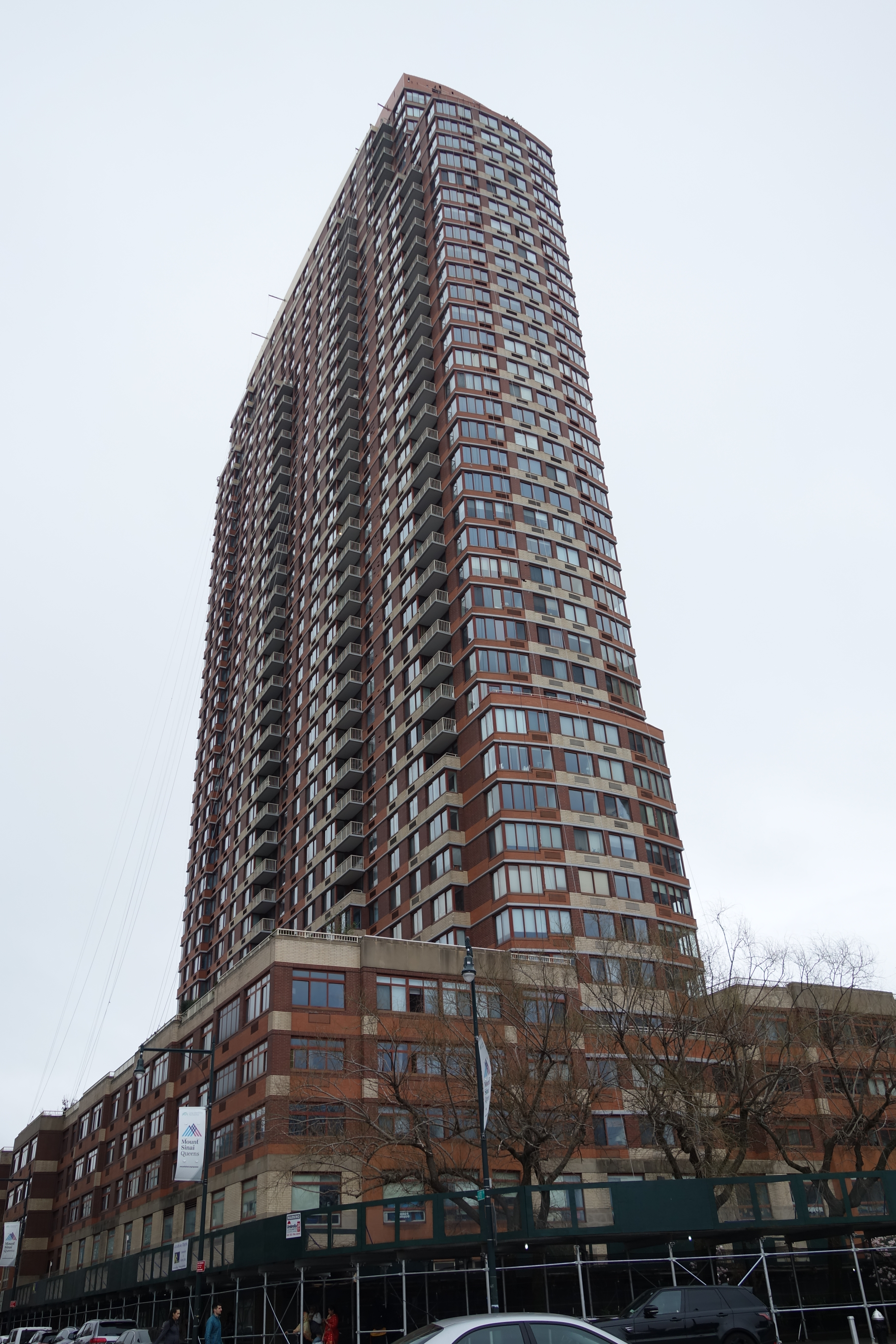
- Citylights in 2019

- Location within New York City
- Alternative names: 4-74 48th Avenue

General information
- Type: Residential (cooperative / condop)
- Architectural style: Postmodern
- Location: Hunters Point, Long Island City, Queens, New York City, 4-74 48th Avenue, Long Island City, NY 11109
- Coordinates: 40.7437°N 73.9592°W
- Groundbreaking: 1995
- Completed: 1997
- Opened: April 1997
- Owner: Citylights at Queens Landing co-op
- Landlord: Empire State Development (ground lease)

Height
- Height: 410 ft (120 m)

Technical details
- Floor count: 42

Design and construction
- Architects: Cesar Pelli & Associates; SLCE Architects
- Developer: William Zeckendorf Jr.

Other information
- Parking: Five-story garage

Website
- citylightsbuilding.com

Citylights at Queens Landing, commonly known as Citylights, is a 42-story residential high-rise cooperative at 4-74 48th Avenue in Hunters Point, Long Island City, Queens, New York City. Citylights was designed by Cesar Pelli & Associates and SLCE Architects and completed in 1997. It is the first building constructed as part of the state's Queens West project and the first high-rise residential building on the Long Island City waterfront. Citylights has 522 units and overlooks Gantry Plaza State Park and the East River.

Citylights was marketed by New York State as middle-income housing, with initial purchase prices kept low in exchange for a large underlying mortgage carried by the co-op and a 20-year payment in lieu of taxes (PILOT) agreement. The expiration of that agreement in 2018, combined with a near-doubling of the building's assessed value by the New York City Department of Finance, prompted a multi-year campaign by residents and elected officials for tax relief.

== History ==
=== Planning ===
The site is part of Queens West, a 74-acre waterfront redevelopment first proposed by the Port Authority of New York and New Jersey in 1983 and approved by the city's Board of Estimate in 1990. The project was overseen by the Queens West Development Corporation (QWDC), a subsidiary of the state's Empire State Development Corporation formed in 1992.

In 1994 it was announced that Manhattan Overlook Associates, a partnership that included developer William Zeckendorf Jr., the Trotwood Corporation and two Japanese companies, would build the first Queens West building: a 42-story apartment tower designed by Cesar Pelli. The Queens West design guidelines were derived from those written for Battery Park City in 1979, and the project drew criticism from The New York Times architecture critic Herbert Muschamp, who questioned whether a new waterfront district should be required to echo pre-war New York architecture.

=== Construction and opening ===
Construction began in 1995, and the tower was completed in 1997. The co-op opened in April 1997. A 1996 New York Times real estate article promoting the building ran under the headline "Pioneers Wanted; East River Views". At the time, the surrounding Hunters Point waterfront was largely industrial, and residents later described having bought in a "desolate" area without basic retail services.

Units were initially offered at prices far below market: studios for as little as $10,000, one-bedrooms with a den for about $25,700, and three-bedroom apartments for about $65,000. In exchange, the cooperative collectively assumed an $85–86 million mortgage covering a large share of the development costs, which kept purchase prices low but produced high monthly maintenance charges. The building also required roughly $10 million in repairs for engineering problems, according to residents.

Citylights was the only completed building at Queens West for several years; the 32-story Avalon Riverview rental tower, immediately to the south, broke ground in 2000 and was completed in 2002. In a 2000 report, nearby Vernon Boulevard merchants said the co-op's roughly 520 households had not yet transformed the neighborhood's commercial life.

=== Tax dispute ===
Under a ground lease with the state, the co-op made $42,000 of annual payments in lieu of property taxes for 20 years. PILOT benefits began phasing out in July 2018, with step increases of 20 percent per year over five years, and ended completely in July 2023, when the co-op became liable for 100 percent of its property taxes. The Department of Finance assessed the co-op's property at $51.7 million in fiscal year 2016 and $101.6 million in fiscal year 2019, an 87 percent increase that the co-op board said reflected the value of newer rental buildings in the area. Annual property tax payments to the city were reported at $5.2 million to $5.8 million. The co-op also paid about $500,000 per year in ground rent to the state, in addition to servicing its mortgage.

Residents organized a group called "Save Citylights" and held two protests in 2018. The first, in June, took place outside the LIC Summit at the Museum of the Moving Image. The second, in July, was held on the steps of New York City Hall, where residents delivered a copy of their tax bill marked "return to sender." The co-op board projected that maintenance costs would rise 50–60 percent over five years. It also cited a survey finding that roughly 85 percent of shareholders could not afford to remain in the building under the higher charges. The group's supporters included New York City Council member Jimmy Van Bramer, State Senator Michael Gianaris, and New York City Comptroller Scott Stringer. In January 2019, Stringer wrote to Mayor Bill de Blasio requesting relief for the residents. He later pressed ESD to amend the building's ground lease to match those of other Queens West developments, most of which paid $1 per year.

The controversy involved Amazon's November 2018 announcement that it would build a second headquarters campus‚ "HQ2‚" in Long Island City․ The board chair‚ Joanna Rock‚ and Van Bramer stated that Amazon was expected to pay about $850‚000 per year for 4 million square feet of space‚ less than the per-square-foot ground rent paid by the cooperative‚ and receive $3 billion in public benefits․ ESD officials said they could develop programs to help low-income cooperative residents but could not change the terms of the cooperative's lease without written approval from the city‚ as required by the PILOT agreement; the city's Department of Finance did not grant written approval. The cooperative appealed its tax assessment to the New York City Tax Commission․

== Architecture ==
The tower was designed by Cesar Pelli & Associates and SLCE Architects. It has 42 stories and a height of 410 ft (120 m) according to the Council on Tall Buildings and Urban Habitat. The building's exterior is stepped rather than flat, and its roof is curved. The building is a condop: its five lowest floors, used for commercial and institutional purposes including a public elementary school, are a condominium, while the upper floors are a residential cooperative. Unit types include studios and one- to three-bedroom apartments.

The base of the building houses P.S. 78Q, the Robert F. Wagner Jr. School, a roughly 350-seat public elementary school serving pre-kindergarten through fifth grade.

== See also ==
- Queens West
- Gantry Plaza State Park
- List of tallest buildings in Queens
- Housing cooperative
