= Tower 28 =

Residential skyscraper in Queens, New York

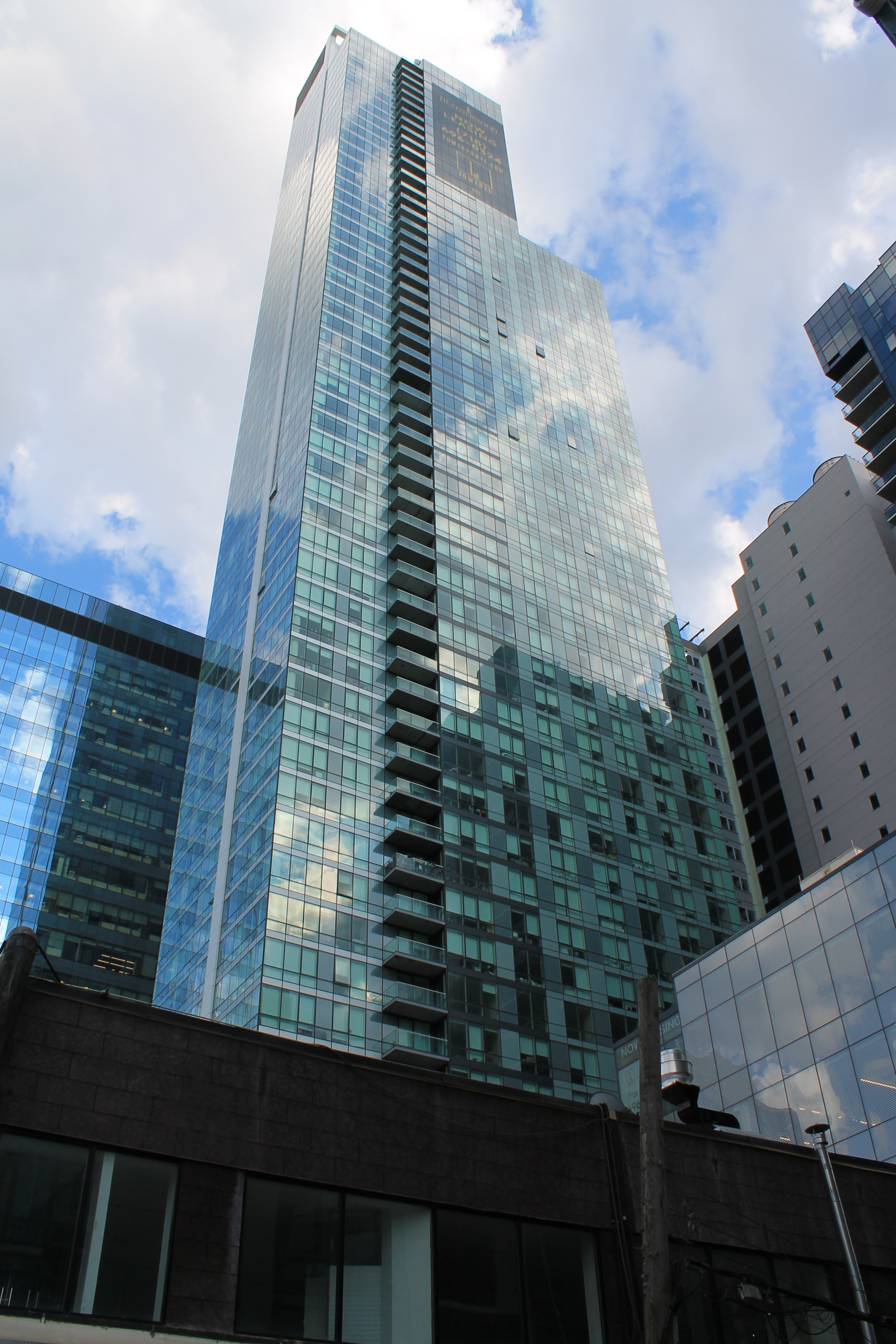
- Interactive map of the Tower 28 area

General information
- Status: Completed
- Location: 42-12 28th Street, Queens
- Coordinates: 40°44′58″N 73°56′23″W
- Construction started: 2014
- Completed: 2017
- Owner: Heatherwood Communities

Height
- Roof: 637 ft (194 m)

Technical details
- Floor count: 57
- Floor area: 330,624 square feet (30,716.0 m^{2})

Design and construction
- Architect: Hill West Architects
- Structural engineer: DeSimone Consulting Engineers
- Main contractor: Petrocelli

Tower 28 is a 637-foot (194 m), 57-story skyscraper in the Long Island City neighborhood of Queens, New York City. It is the fourth tallest residential building in Queens and the sixth tallest residential building in New York City outside of Manhattan.

The building includes around 450 residential units. The building has an observation deck on the 60th floor.

In 2019, the developer secured a $215 million loan from Morgan Stanley, replacing a $154 million construction loan from PNC Bank.

== See also ==
- List of tallest buildings in New York City
- List of tallest buildings in Queens
