= SL Green Realty =

American real estate investment firm

SL Green Realty Corp.
- Company type: Public company
- Traded as: NYSE: SLG; S&P 600 component
- Industry: Real estate investment trust
- Founded: 1997; 29 years ago
- Founder: Stephen L. Green
- Headquarters: New York City, New York, U.S.
- Key people: Marc Holliday, Chairman & CEO; Andrew W. Mathias, President; Matthew J. DiLiberto, CFO
- Revenue: ▼US$886 million (2024)
- Net income: ▲US$30 million (2024)
- Total assets: ▲US$10.470 billion (2024)
- Total equity: ▲US$3.951 billion (2024)
- Number of employees: 1,221 (2024)
- Website: slgreen.com

SL Green Realty Corp. is a real estate investment trust that primarily invests in office buildings and shopping centers in New York City. As of December 31, 2024, the company owned interests in 39 properties comprising 25,297,353 square feet, primarily in Manhattan. It has been referred to as "New York City’s largest office landlord".

Notable properties owned by the company are One Astor Plaza, One Vanderbilt, 461 Fifth Avenue, 810 Seventh Avenue, 919 Third Avenue, the Pershing Square Building, and Random House Tower.

== History ==
The company's predecessor, S.L. Green Properties, Inc., was formed in 1980 by Stephen L. Green. In 1997, the company was formed as a successor.

In 2000, the company sold the Whitehall Building. In 2002, in partnership with SITQ, the company acquired One Astor Plaza for $483.5 million.

In 2003, the company acquired 461 Fifth Avenue for $100.3 million. In November 2004, the company sold The Knickerbocker Hotel in Manhattan for $160 million. In 2005, the company acquired the Metropolitan Life Insurance Company Tower for $916 million and converted the building into condominiums.

In 2006, the company acquired Reckson Associates in a $4 billion transaction. In December 2007, the company acquired 388 Greenwich Street from Citigroup in a leaseback transaction. Citigroup reacquired the building in 2016.

In 2010, the company acquired the Pershing Square Building from Shorenstein Properties for $330 million. In 2011, the company sold One Court Square in Long Island City, Queens to David Werner and Joel Schreiber for $481 million

In August 2017, the company sold the Montague-Court Building for $171 million to CIM Group. The company had bought the property for $107.5 million in 2007 and made significant upgrades. In November 2018, the company purchased a $148 million stake in 245 Park Avenue from Chinese conglomerate HNA Group. The company was also appointed as property manager and leasing manager.

== Buildings ==
Notable buildings managed by SL Green Realty include:

- One Vanderbilt
- One Astor Plaza
- 110 East 42nd Street
- 461 Fifth Avenue
- 810 Seventh Avenue
- 919 Third Avenue
- Graybar Building
- The News Building
- Pershing Square Building
- Random House Tower
- Worldwide Plaza
