= 810 Seventh Avenue =

Office skyscraper in Manhattan, New York

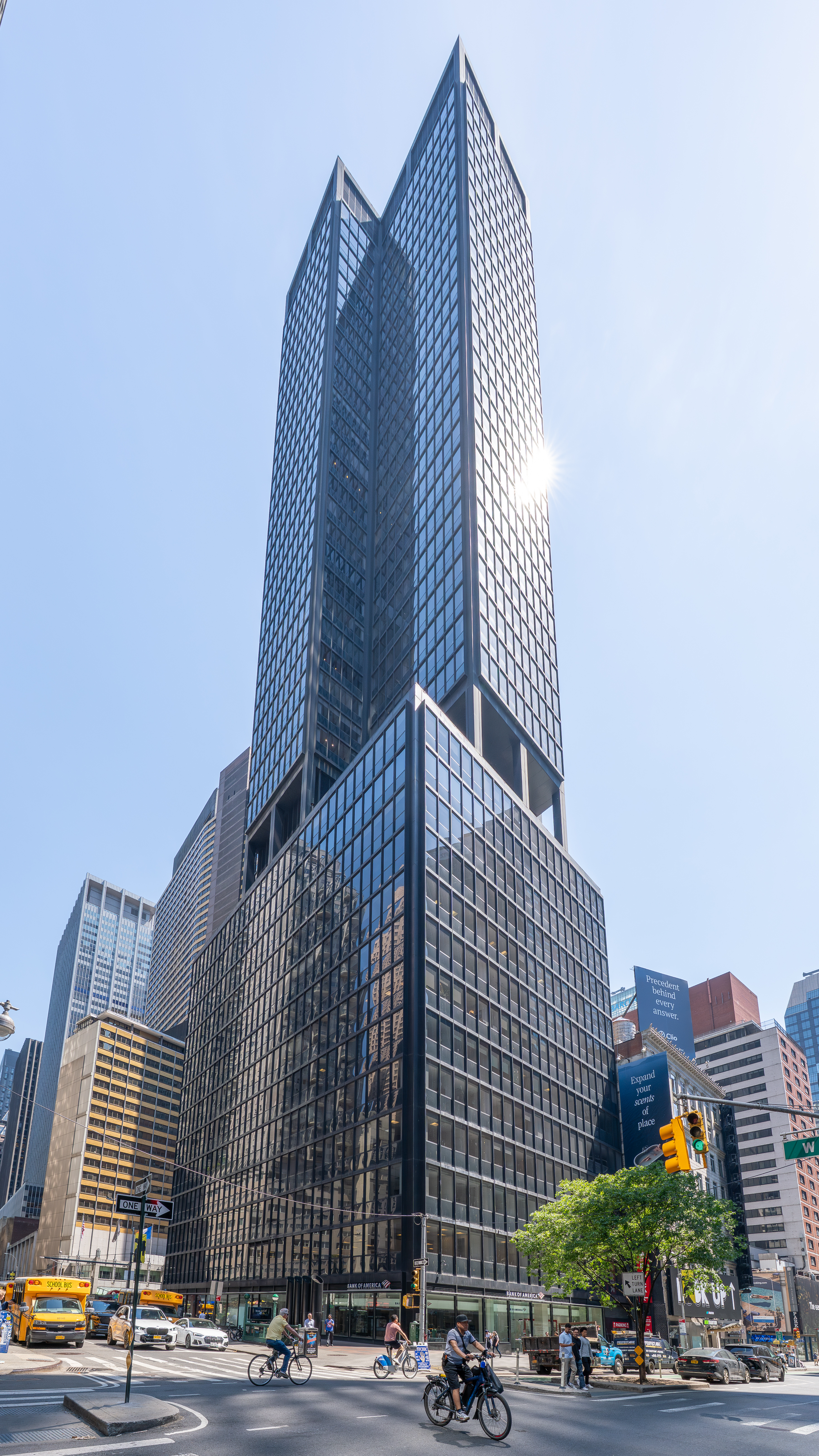
- View from ground (2026)
- Interactive map of the 810 Seventh Avenue area

General information
- Status: Completed
- Type: Office
- Location: 810 7th Avenue, Manhattan, New York, United States
- Coordinates: 40.7627°N 73.9826°W
- Opened: 1969

Height
- Height: 525 feet (160 m)

Technical details
- Floor count: 41
- Floor area: 701,085 square feet (65,132.9 m^{2})
- Lifts/elevators: 12 passenger, 1 freight elevators

Design and construction
- Architect: Kahn & Jacobs

810 Seventh Avenue is an office skyscraper a few blocks north of Times Square on Seventh Avenue between 52nd and 53rd streets within Midtown Manhattan in New York City, New York, U.S. It is owned by SL Green Realty Corp. after its acquisition of Reckson Associates Realty Corp., completed in January 2007. The back of the building is situated on Broadway, diagonally across Broadway and 53rd from CBS's Ed Sullivan Theater, the former home of The Late Show with Stephen Colbert prior to the show's cancelation in 2026.

The building has a large number of tenants, including: AT&T Wireless, Aegis Capital Corp., CompassRock Real Estate (40th Floor), Constellation Energy, EMI Entertainment, Scripps Networks - Ion Media Networks, Hearst Communications, IAC/InterActiveCorp, Insight Communications, The Raine Group, Metromedia Company, Murex, Oppenheimer & Co., Pixafy

== Other details ==
- 41 stories, 26 units
- Office area: 643,713 square feet (59,802.9 m^{2})
- Retail area: 12,372 square feet (1,149.4 m^{2})
- Garage area: 45,000 square feet (4,200 m^{2})
- LEED Certification
