= Lumen (building) =

Residential building in Queens, New York

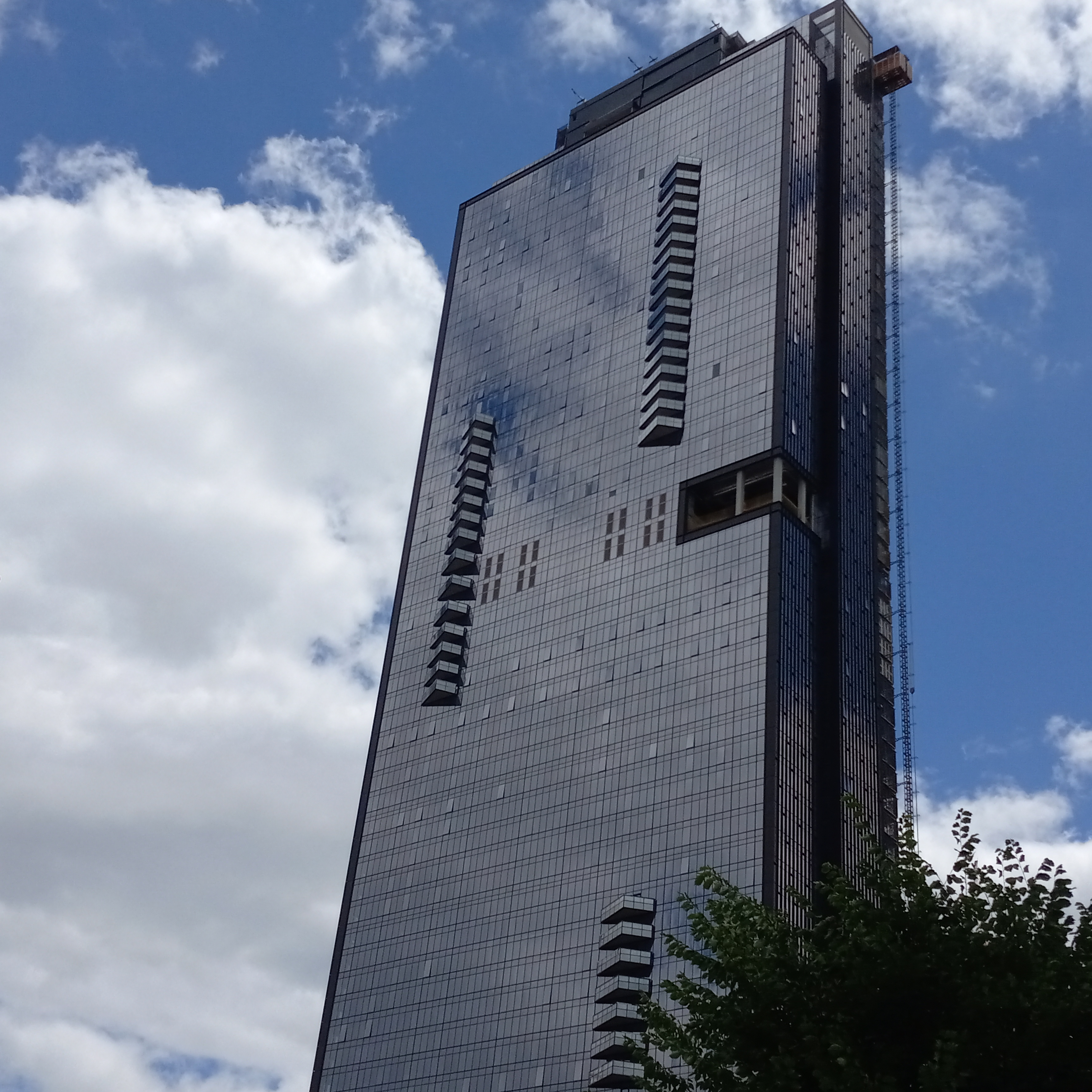
- Lumen under construction, June 2024
- Interactive map of the Lumen area

General information
- Status: Topped-out
- Type: Residential
- Location: 23-15 44th Road; Long Island City, Queens, New York
- Coordinates: 40°44′56″N 73°56′38″W
- Construction started: 2022
- Completed: 2026

Height
- Roof: 731 ft (223 m)

Technical details
- Floor count: 66
- Floor area: 838,000 square feet (77,900 m^{2})

Design and construction
- Architect: Hill West Architects
- Developer: Carmel Partners
- Main contractor: Carmel Construction East

Lumen is a residential skyscraper located at 23-15 44th Road in the Long Island City neighborhood of Queens, New York City. At 731 feet (223 m) tall, Lumen is the fourth-tallest building in Queens, as well as the fifth-tallest building in New York City outside of Manhattan. The building, designed by Hill West Architects and developed by Carmel Partners, broke ground in 2022 and is expected to be completed by 2026.

== Description ==
Lumen is located between Queensboro Plaza and Court Square in Long Island City, occupying most of a trapezoidal lot bounded by 43rd Avenue to the north, 24th Street to the east, 23rd Street to the west, and 44th Road to the south. The base of the tower consists of a brick-clad podium with ground-floor retail space, parking, and residential amenities. The 66-story tower rises 731 feet (223 m) above street level, and consists of 921 residential units. The building totals 838,000 sq ft (77,900 m^{2}) of floor area, including 17,400 sq ft (1,620 m^{2}) of retail space.

== See also ==
- List of tallest buildings in New York City
- List of tallest buildings in Queens
