= List of tallest buildings in Queens =

Skyline of Queens
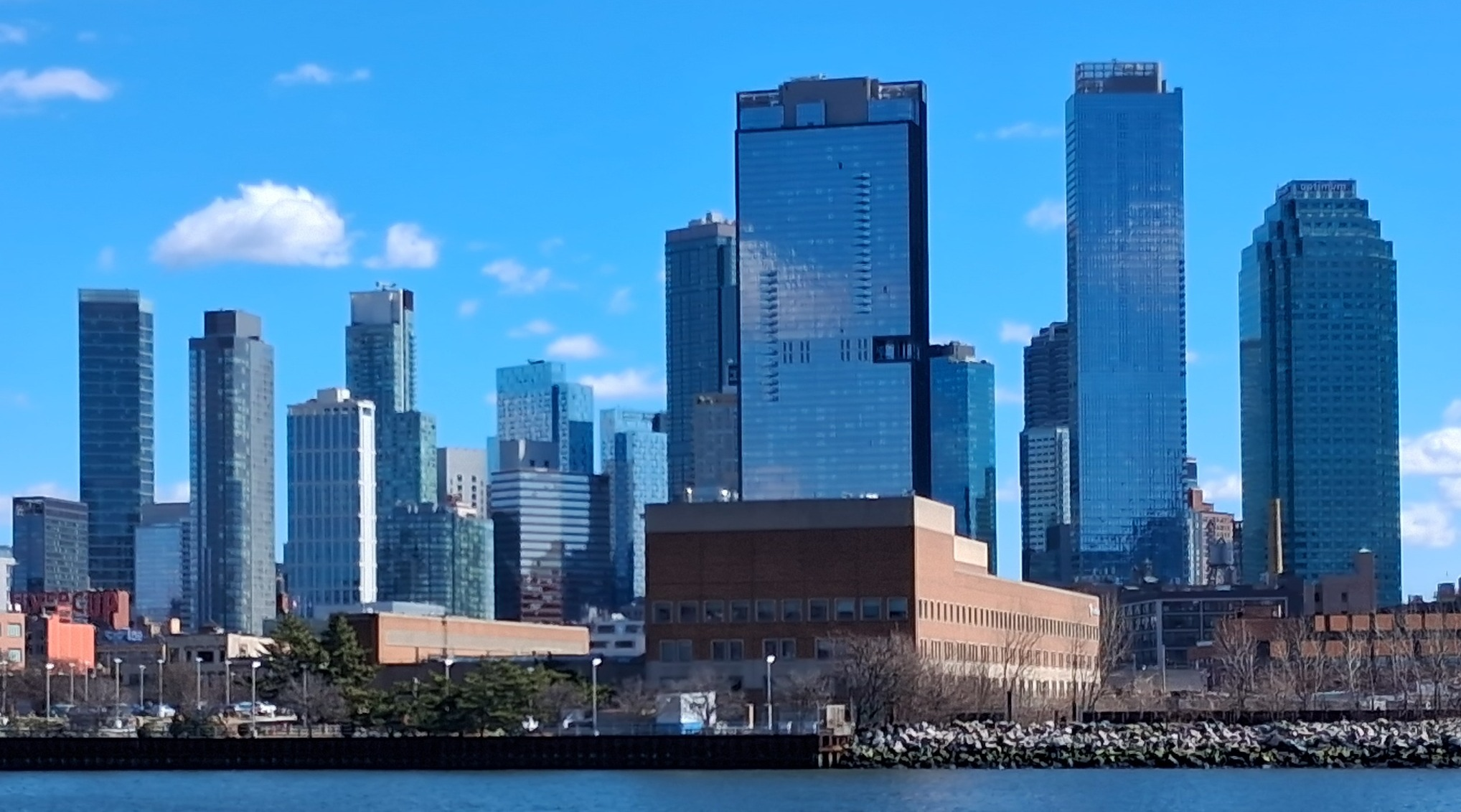
- Long Island City in 2026
- Tallest building: The Orchard (2026)
- Tallest building height: 823 ft (250.9 m)
- First 150 m+ building: One Court Square (1990)

Number of tall buildings (2026)
- Taller than 100 m (328 ft): 41
- Taller than 150 m (492 ft): 16
- Taller than 200 m (656 ft): 5

Number of tall buildings — feet
- Taller than 300 ft (91.4 m): 54

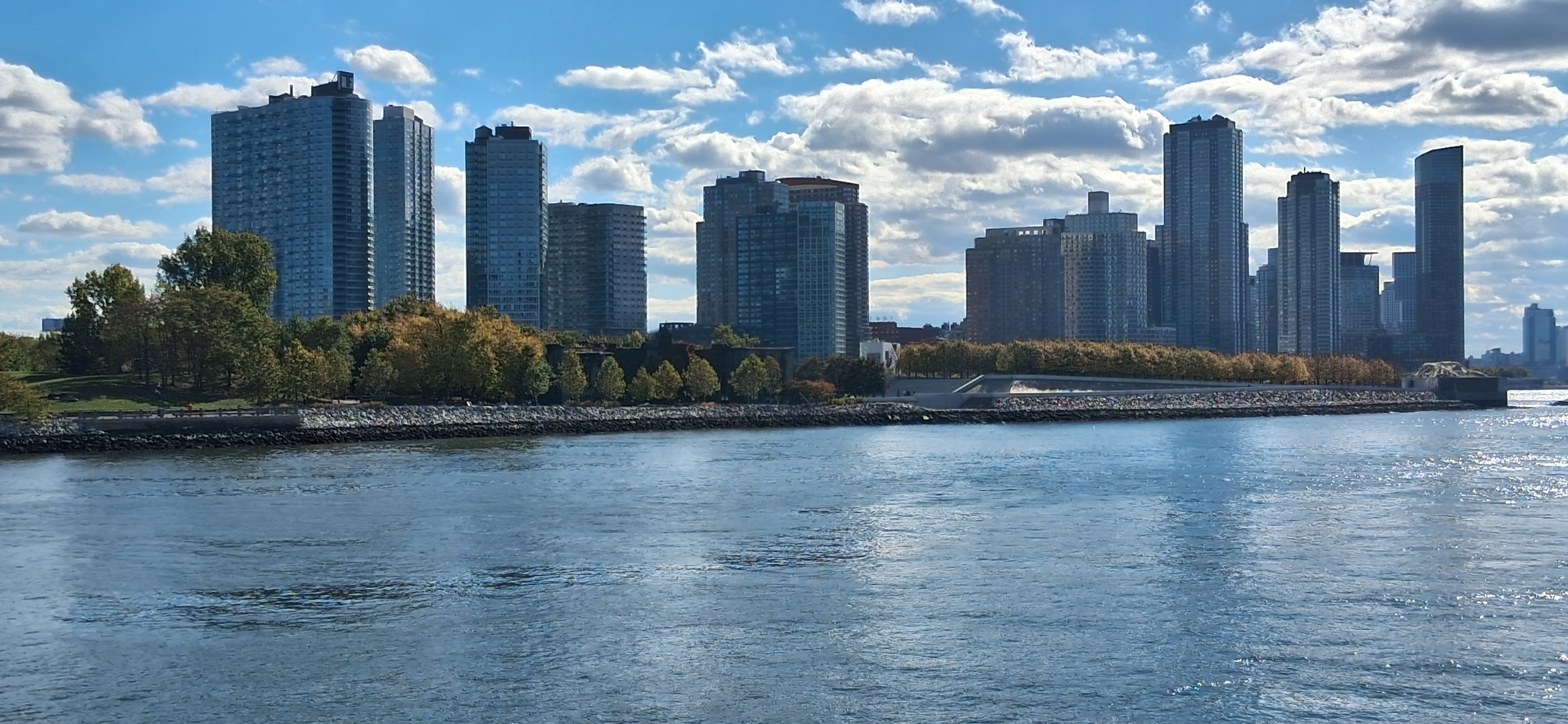
Residential towers on the East River waterfront

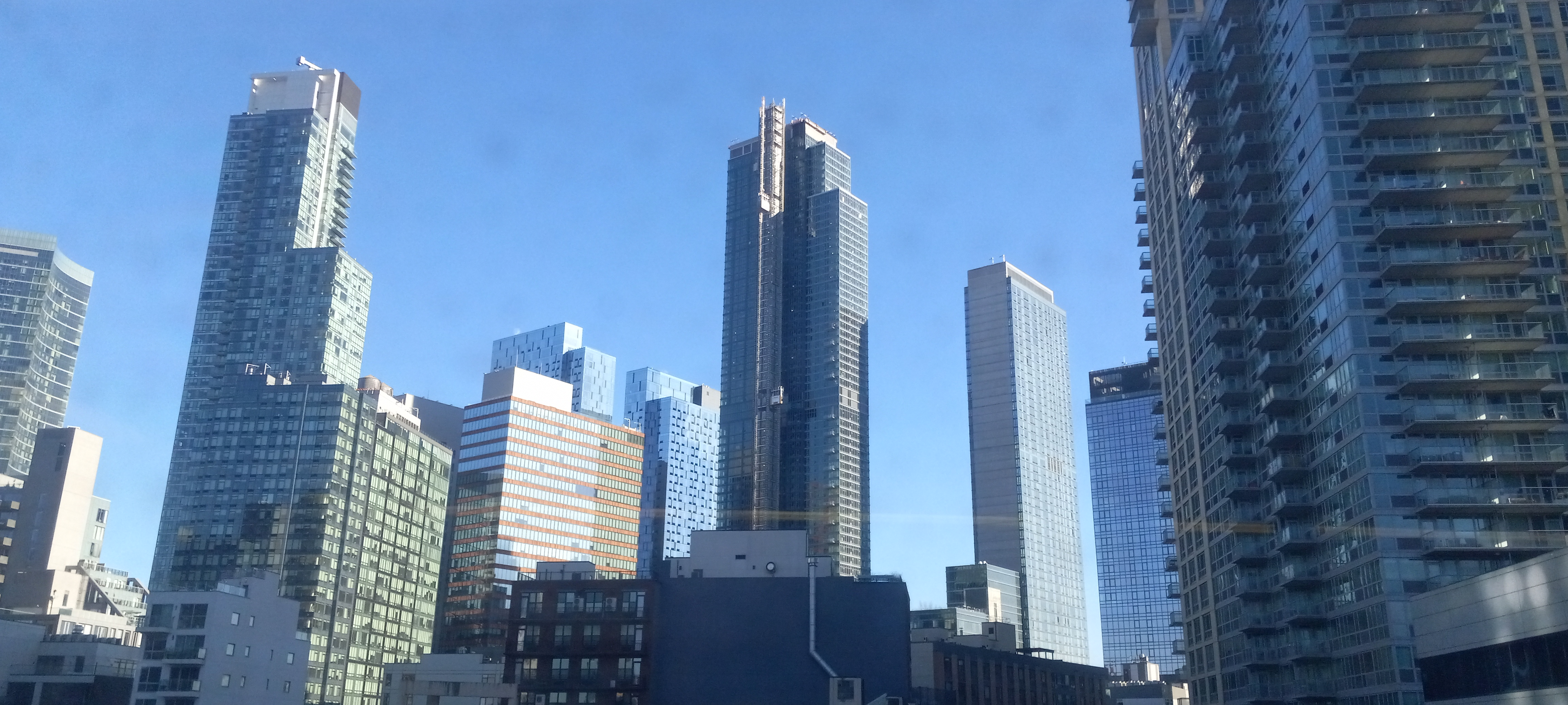
Long Island City viewed from within in 2025

Queens, the largest of New York City's five boroughs by area and the second largest by population, is home to over 54 buildings taller than 300 feet (91 m) as of 2026. 16 skyscrapers reach a height of 492 ft (150 m), the third most of the five boroughs after Manhattan and Brooklyn. Since the 2000s, Queens has been undergoing a skyscraper boom, particularly in the neighborhood of Long Island City. The tallest building in Queens is The Orchard, a 823 ft (251 m) tall residential skyscraper in Long Island City completed in 2026. The Orchard is the second tallest building in New York City outside of Manhattan, after the Brooklyn Tower in Brooklyn. With the exception of One Court Square, all 20 of Queens' tallest buildings were completed after 2016.

The history of skyscrapers in Queens began in 1927 with the construction of the 207 ft (63 m) Bank of the Manhattan Company Building, built for the Manhattan Company. In addition to 11 stories of offices, the Neo-Gothic structure featured a 3-story clock tower. It remained the tallest office building in Queens for over 60 years, and the tallest building in the borough until the completion of the Kennedy House in 1964. In 1975, the North Shore Towers, a residential cooperative in neighborhood of Floral Park, became the tallest buildings in Queens. The three towers had 34 floors each, with the tallest, Beaumont Tower, boasting a height of 370 ft (113 m).

In 1985, Citicorp announced plans to build an office tower in Long Island City, which would be realized as One Court Square. Completed in 1990, the 673 ft (205 m), 50-story green-tinted skyscraper towered over the then low-lying industrial neighborhood. This would change with the rezoning of the neighborhood in 2001, allowing for denser high-rise residential buildings. Since then, Long Island City has seen substantial commercial and residential growth, especially from the 2010s onward; the area has added residential units at a faster rate than any other neighborhood in the United States. Major developments in the 2010s include Tower 28 and the Jackson Park complex. Four buildings in Queens have surpassed the height of One Court Square, all built in the 2020s. Built in 2021 at height of 762 ft (232 m), the Skyline Tower was the tallest building in Queens until it was overtaken by The Orchard.

The borough's waterfront on the East River has also seen significant high-rise development with the Queens West redevelopment project. Hunter's Point South, a mixed-use development, involved the construction of multiple high-rise towers and a new waterfront park. In Astoria, the two-tower Halletts Point development was completed in 2025. Elsewhere in Queens, the neighborhoods of Flushing and Jamaica have been the site of notable high-rise development in the 21st century.

== History ==
Number of buildings by height in Queens by the end of each year, based on the information in this article. Click on the legend to toggle a specific height on or off. View chart definition.

== Map of tallest buildings ==
The map below displays the location of buildings taller than 300 ft (91 m) in Hunters Point and Long Island City. Buildings outside the scope of the map are marked with an asterisk. Each marker is numbered by the building's height rank, and coloured by the decade of its completion.

Buildings taller than 300 ft (91 m) in Queens. An asterisk (*) next to the building's name indicates it is located outside the map.
- 1970s
- 1980s
- 1990s
- 2000s
- 2010s
- 2020s
1 The Orchard
2 Skyline Tower
3 Sven
4 Lumen
5 One Court Square
6 Tower 28
7 Gotham Point North Tower
8 Eagle Lofts
9 5203 Center Blvd
10 3 Jackson Park
11 The Italic
12 1 QPS Tower
13 Hayden
14 1 Jackson Park
15 5 Pointz North Tower
16 5241 Center Blvd
17 ALTA LIC
18 2 Jackson Park
19 5 Pointz South Tower
20 2-21 Malt Drive East Tower
21 Linc LIC
22 One Gotham Center
23 Three Gotham Center
24 Citylights at Queens Landing
25 Hunter's Point South Commons
26 4615 Center Boulevard
27 4545 Center Boulevard
28 2-20 Malt Drive South Tower
29 Avalon Riverview North
30 The Forge
31 The Bold
32 AURA
33 North Shore Towers – Beaumont Tower*
34 Gotham Point South Tower
35 30 Halletts Point*
36 4540 Center Boulevard
37 Aurora LIC and Courtyard Marriott
38 North Shore Towers – Amherst Tower*
39 North Shore Towers – Coleridge Tower*
40 Hunter's Point South Crossing
41 4705 Center Boulevard
42 Court Plaza*
43 Two Gotham Center
44 The Crossing at Jamaica Station Tower 1*
45 Kennedy House*
46 The Avalon Riverview South
47 4720 Center Boulevard
48 Link Apartments QPN
49 2-21 Malt Drive West Tower
50 Halo LIC
51 The Harrison
52 27 on 27th
53 Watermark LIC
54 20 Halletts Point*

== Tallest buildings ==
This list ranks completed buildings in Queens that stand at least 300 ft (91 m) tall as of 2026, based on standard height measurement. This includes spires and architectural details but does not include antenna masts. The “Year” column indicates the year of completion. Buildings tied in height are sorted by year of completion with earlier buildings ranked first, and then alphabetically.

Was the tallest building in Queens upon completion

| Rank | Name | Image | Location | Height ft (m) | Floors | Year | Purpose | Notes |
|---|---|---|---|---|---|---|---|---|
| 1 | The Orchard | | 27-48 Jackson Avenue 40°44′53″N 73°56′21″W | 823 (250.9) | 69 | 2026 | Residential | Tallest building in Queens since 2026. Tallest building in Queens completed in the 2020s. Topped out on July 2024. |
| 2 | Skyline Tower | | 23-15 44th Drive 40°44′52″N 73°56′40″W | 762 (232.4) | 67 | 2021 | Residential | Tallest building in Queens from 2021 to 2026. Tallest building in New York City outside of Manhattan from 2021 to 2023. Formerly known as Court Square City View Tower. |
| 3 | Sven | | 29-59 Northern Boulevard 40°45′00″N 73°56′11″W | 737 (224.6) | 67 | 2021 | Residential | Second-tallest building in Queens at the time of completion. |
| 4 | Lumen | | 23-15 44th Road 40°44′56″N 73°56′38″W | 732 (223.1) | 66 | 2025 | Residential | |
| 5 | One Court Square | | 25-01 Jackson Avenue 40°44′49″N 73°56′38″W | 673 (205.1) | 50 | 1990 | Office | Tallest building in Queens from 1990 to 2021. Tallest building in Queens completed in the 1990s. Tallest office building in Queens. Also known as the Citigroup Building. |
| 6 | Tower 28 | | 42-12 28th Street 40°44′58″N 73°56′22″W | 637 (194.2) | 57 | 2017 | Residential | Tallest building in Queens completed in the 2010s. Second-tallest building in Queens at the time of completion. |
| 7 | Gotham Point North Tower | | 1-15 57th Avenue 40°44′22″N 73°57′41″W | 612 (186.5) | 57 | 2023 | Residential | Also known as Hunters Point South Parcel F. |
| 8 | Eagle Lofts | | 43-22 Queens Street 40°44′50″N 73°56′23″W | 598 (182.2) | 55 | 2018 | Residential | |
| 9 | 5203 Center Blvd | | 52-03 Center Boulevard 40°44′32″N 73°57′35″W | 586 (178.6) | 55 | 2022 | Residential | Also known as Center Blvd at Hunter's Point South and Hunter's Point South Phase 2 Tower A. |
| 10 | 2 Jackson Park | | 28-30 Jackson Avenue 40°44′55″N 73°56′17″W | 581 (177.1) | 54 | 2018 | Residential | |
| 11 | The Italic | | 26-32 Jackson Avenue 40°44′51″N 73°56′27″W | 526 (160.3) | 50 | 2025 | Residential | |
| 12 | 1 QPS Tower | — | 42-20 24th Street 40°45′02″N 73°56′32″W | 510 (155.4) | 44 | 2017 | Residential | Purchased in 2018 for $284 million by The Carlyle Group. |
| 13 | Hayden | | 43-25 Hunter Street 40°44′51″N 73°56′33″W | 509 (155.1) | 50 | 2017 | Residential | |
| 14 | 3 Jackson Park | | 28-10 Jackson Avenue 40°44′53″N 73°56′19″W | 501 (152.6) | 45 | 2018 | Residential | |
| 15 | 5 Pointz North Tower | | 22-44 Jackson Avenue 40°44′43″N 73°56′46″W | 498 (151.8) | 48 | 2019 | Residential | |
| 16 | 5241 Center Blvd | | 52-41 Center Blvd 40°44′28″N 73°57′37″W | 493 (150.4) | 46 | 2021 | Residential | Also known as Center Blvd at Hunter's Point North and Hunter's Point South Phase 2 Tower B. |
| 17 | ALTA LIC | | 29-22 Northern Boulevard 40°44′57″N 73°56′10″W | 485 (147.7) | 44 | 2018 | Residential | |
| 18 | 1 Jackson Park | | 28-40 Jackson Avenue 40°44′54″N 73°56′14″W | 470 (143.4) | 43 | 2018 | Residential | |
| 19 | 5 Pointz South Tower | | 22-44 Jackson Avenue 40°44′40″N 73°56′44″W | 440 (134.1) | 42 | 2019 | Residential | |
| 20 | 2-21 Malt Drive East Tower | | 2-21 Malt Drive 40°44′24″N 73°57′29″W | 440 (134.1) | 38 | 2024 | Residential | Part of the Malt Drive development. |
| 21 | Linc LIC | | 43-10 Crescent Street 40°44′55″N 73°56′34″W | 429 (130.8) | 41 | 2013 | Residential | |
| 22 | One Gotham Center | — | 28-07 Jackson Avenue 40°44′55″N 73°56′21″W | 427 (130.3) | 27 | 2019 | Office | Part of the larger Gotham Center Development. |
| 23 | Three Gotham Center | | 28-07 Jackson Avenue 40°44′57″N 73°56′18″W | 427 (130.3) | 27 | 2019 | Office | Part of the larger Gotham Center Development. |
| 24 | Citylights at Queens Landing | | 4-74 48th Avenue 40°44′40″N 73°57′26″W | 410 (124.9) | 42 | 1997 | Residential | Tallest residential building and second tallest building in Queens at the time of completion. |
| 25 | Hunter's Point South Commons | | 1-50 50th Avenue 40°44′37″N 73°57′33″W | 404 (123.1) | 37 | 2015 | Residential | |
| 26 | 4615 Center Boulevard | | 46-15 Center Boulevard 40°44′50″N 73°57′22″W | 400 (121.9) | 41 | 2013 | Residential | |
| 27 | 4545 Center Boulevard | | 45-45 Center Boulevard 40°44′53″N 73°57′22″W | 390 (118.9) | 40 | 2013 | Residential | |
| 28 | 2-20 Malt Drive South Tower | | 2-20 Malt Drive 40°44′22″N 73°57′31″W | 390 (118.9) | 33 | 2024 | Residential | Part of the Malt Drive development. |
| 29 | Avalon Riverview North | | 47-38 5th Street 40°44′42″N 73°57′25″W | 385 (117.4) | 39 | 2007 | Residential | Tallest building in Queens completed in the 2000s. |
| 30 | The Forge | — | 44-28 Purves Street 40°44′48″N 73°56′28″W | 384 (116.9) | 33 | 2017 | Residential | |
| 31 | The Bold | | 27-01 Jackson Avenue 40°44′52″N 73°56′28″W | 376 (114.5) | 27 | 2024 | Residential | |
| 32 | AURA | — | 23-02 42nd Road 40°45′01″N 73°56′34″W | 372 (113.4) | 36 | 2025 | Residential | |
| 33 | North Shore Towers – Beaumont Tower | | 270-10 Grand Central Parkway 40°45′25″N 73°42′54″W | 370 (112.8) | 34 | 1975 | Residential | Tallest building in Queens from 1975 to 1990s. Tallest building in Queens completed in the 1970s. |
| 34 | Gotham Point South Tower | | 57-28 2nd Street 40°44′19″N 73°57′38″W | 360 (109.7) | 33 | 2021 | Residential | Also known as 57-28 2nd Street. |
| 35 | 30 Halletts Point | — | 30 Halletts Point 40°46′34″N 73°56′11″W | 356 (108.4) | 33 | 2025 | Residential | |
| 36 | 4540 Center Boulevard | | 45-40 Center Boulevard 40°44′53″N 73°57′26″W | 350 (106.7) | 32 | 2013 | Residential | |
| 37 | Aurora LIC and Courtyard Marriott | | 29-07 Queens Plaza North 40°45′00″N 73°56′14″W | 350 (106.7) | 32 | 2016 | Mixed-use | Mixed-use residential and hotel building. Also known as Courtyard Long Island City/New York Manhattan View and Marriott Queens. |
| 38 | North Shore Towers – Amherst Tower | | 271-10 Grand Central Parkway 40°45′27″N 73°42′49″W | 346 (105.5) | 34 | 1975 | Residential | |
| 39 | North Shore Towers – Coleridge Tower | | 269-10 Grand Central Parkway 40°45′28″N 73°42′58″W | 346 (105.5) | 34 | 1975 | Residential | |
| 40 | Hunter's Point South Crossing | | 1-55 Borden Avenue 40°44′33″N 73°57′33″W | 342 (104.3) | 32 | 2015 | Residential | |
| 41 | 4705 Center Boulevard | | 47-05 Center Boulevard 40°44′45″N 73°57′22″W | 331 (100.9) | 30 | 2008 | Residential | |
| 42 | Court Plaza | — | 123-33 83rd Avenue 40°42′42″N 73°49′38″W | 327 (99.7) | 32 | 1974 | Residential | Tallest building in Queens briefly from 1974 to 1975. |
| 43 | Two Gotham Center | | 28-01 Jackson Avenue 40°44′58″N 73°56′20″W | 327 (99.6) | 22 | 2011 | Office | |
| 44 | The Crossing at Jamaica Station Tower 1 | | 147-22 Archer Avenue 40°42′02″N 73°48′25″W | 325 (99) | 26 | 2019 | Residential | Tallest building in Jamaica. |
| 45 | Kennedy House | — | 110-11 Queens Boulevard 40°43′13″N 73°50′23″W | 323 (98.5) | 33 | 1964 | Residential | Tallest building in Queens completed in the 1960s. |
| 46 | The Avalon Riverview South | | 2-01 50th Avenue 40°44′38″N 73°57′31″W | 321 (97.8) | 32 | 2002 | Residential | |
| 47 | 4720 Center Boulevard | | 47-20 Center Boulevard 40°44′45″N 73°57′27″W | 320 (97.5) | 31 | 2006 | Residential | Also known as East Coast Tower I. |
| 48 | Link Apartments QPN | | 41-46 27th Street 40°45′03″N 73°56′23″W | 311 (94.8) | 28 | 2025 | Residential | |
| 49 | 2-21 Malt Drive West Tower | | 2-21 Malt Drive 40°44′26″N 73°57′33″W | 310 (94.5) | 25 | 2024 | Residential | Part of the Malt Drive development. |
| 50 | Halo LIC | — | 44-41 Purves Street 40°44′47″N 73°56′26″W | 308 (94) | 25 | 2015 | Residential | Also known as Purves I. |
| 51 | The Harrison | — | 27-21 44th Drive 40°44′48″N 73°56′30″W | 308 (93.8) | 28 | 2017 | Residential | |
| 52 | 27 on 27th | | 27-03 42nd Road 40°44′58″N 73°56′25″W | 307 (93.6) | 27 | 2011 | Residential | |
| 53 | Watermark LIC | — | 27-19 44th Drive 40°44′48″N 73°56′30″W | 302 (92.1) | 27 | 2017 | Residential | |
| 54 | 20 Halletts Point | — | 20 Halletts Point 40°46′37″N 73°56′09″W | 301 (91.6) | 27 | 2025 | Residential | |

== Tallest under construction or proposed ==
=== Under construction ===
The following table includes buildings under construction in Queens that are planned to be at least 300 ft (91 m) tall as of 2026, based on standard height measurement. The “Year” column indicates the expected year of completion. Buildings that are on hold are not included. For buildings whose heights have not yet been released by their developers, this table uses a floor count of 30 stories as the cutoff.

| Name | Location | Height ft (m) | Floors | Year | Notes |
|---|---|---|---|---|---|
| 24-19 Jackson Ave | 24-11 Jackson Ave 40°44′47″N 73°56′42″W | 676 (206) | 55 | 2029 | |
| 30-25 Queens Boulevard | 29-00 Queens Blvd 40°44′55″N 73°56′12″W | 525 (160) | 46 | 2028 | |

=== Proposed ===
The following table includes approved and proposed buildings in Queens that are planned to be at least 300 ft (91 m) tall as of 2026, based on standard height measurement. The “Year” column indicates the expected year of completion. Buildings that are on hold are not included. For buildings whose heights have not yet been released by their developers, this table uses a floor count of 30 stories as the cutoff.

| Name | Height ft (m) | Floors | Year | Status | Notes |
|---|---|---|---|---|---|
| 42-50 24th Street | 589 (180) | 44 | — | Proposed | Proposed in 2025. |
| 42-19 24th Street | 456 (139) | 40 | — | Proposed | Permits filed in 2024. |
| Opus Point | 404 (123) | 28 | — | Approved | |
| 23-15 43rd Avenue | — | 39 | — | Proposed | Permits filed in 2025. |

== Timeline of tallest buildings ==
This lists buildings that once held the title of tallest building in Queens.

| Name | Image | Street address | Years as tallest | Height ft (m) | Floors | Notes |
|---|---|---|---|---|---|---|
| Bank of the Manhattan Company Building | | 29-27 41st Avenue | 1927–1964 | 207 (63) | 14 | |
| Kennedy House | — | 110-11 Queens Boulevard | 1964–1974 | 323 (98) | 33 | |
| Court Plaza | — | 123-33 83rd Avenue | 1974–1975 | 327 (100) | 32 | |
| North Shore Towers – Beaumont Tower | | 270-10 Grand Central Parkway | 1975–1990 | 370 (113) | 34 | By architectural height, when roof height is considered it was tied by the other two North Shore Towers. |
| One Court Square | | 25-01 Jackson Avenue | 1990–2021 | 673 (205) | 50 | |
| Skyline Tower | | 23-15 44th Drive | 2021–2026 | 778 (237) | 67 | |
| The Orchard | | 27-48 Jackson Avenue | 2026–present | 811 (247) | 69 | |

== See also ==
- Architecture of New York City
- List of tallest buildings in Brooklyn
- List of tallest buildings on Long Island
- List of tallest buildings in New York City
