= The Orchard (building) =

Residential building in Queens, New York

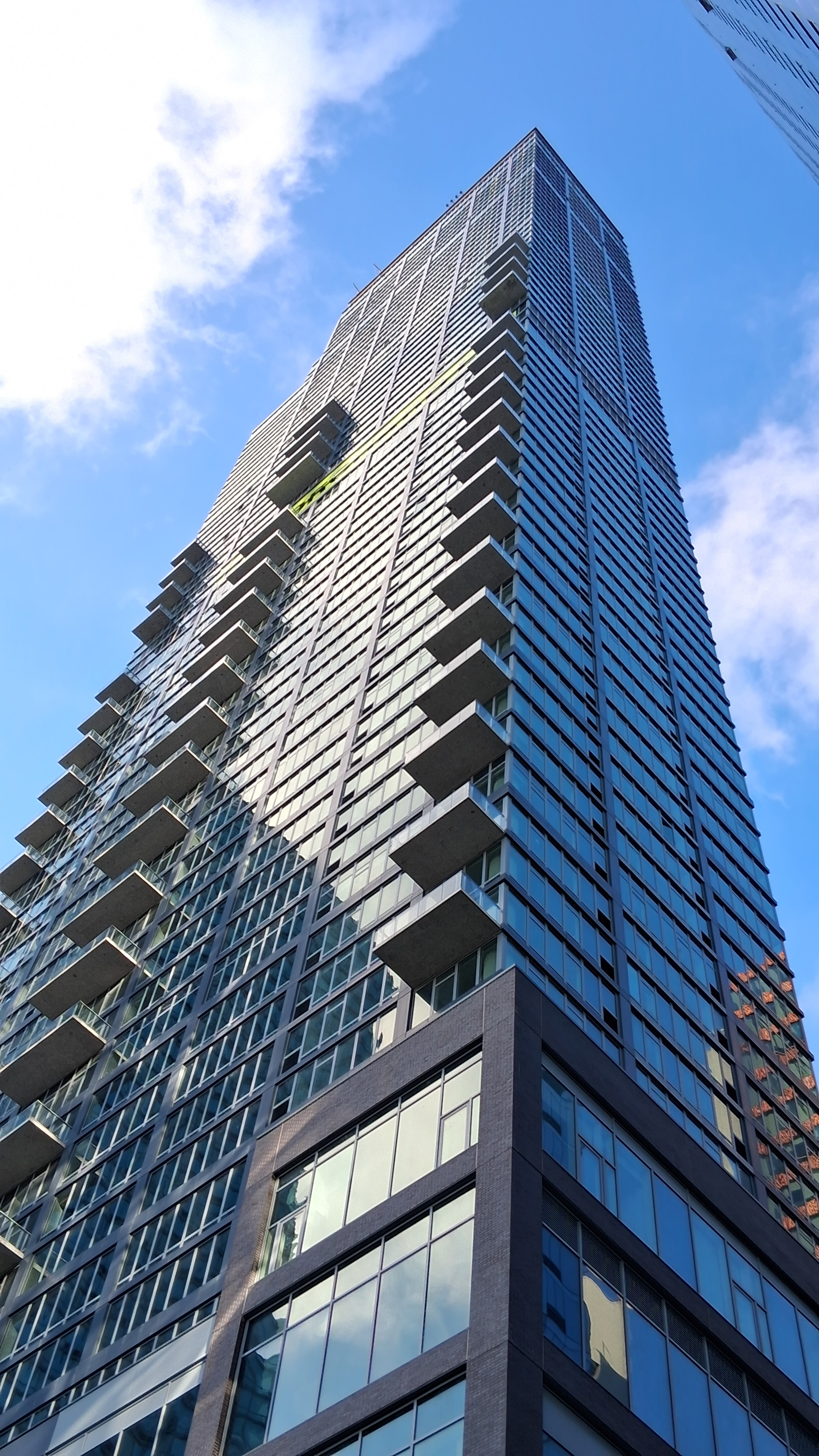
- The Orchard in 2025

General information
- Status: Completed
- Type: Residential
- Location: 27-48 Jackson Avenue; Long Island City, Queens, New York
- Coordinates: 40°44′53″N 73°56′21″W
- Construction started: 2022
- Completed: 2024
- Opening: 2025

Height
- Roof: 823 ft (251 m)

Technical details
- Floor count: 69
- Floor area: 635,000 square feet (59,000 m^{2})

Design and construction
- Architect: Perkins Eastman
- Developer: BLDG Management
- Main contractor: Triton Construction

Website
- theorchardlic.com

The Orchard is a residential skyscraper located at 27-48 Jackson Avenue in the Long Island City neighborhood of Queens, New York City. At 823 feet (251 m) tall, The Orchard is the tallest building in Queens, as well as the second-tallest building in New York City outside of Manhattan, behind the 1,066-foot (325 m) Brooklyn Tower. The building, designed by Perkins Eastman with interiors by McCartan Inc and developed by BLDG Management, broke ground in 2022 and was opened in 2025.

== Description ==
The Orchard is located one block from Queens Plaza, occupying a rectangular lot bounded by Jackson Avenue to the north, Orchard Street to the east, and Queens Street to the west. The base of the tower consists of a two-story underground parking garage and a multi-story retail podium. The 69-story tower rises 823 feet (251 m) above street level. It consists of 824 residential units, of which 200 are designated as affordable. The building totals 635,000 sq ft (59,000 m^{2}) of floor area, including 13,000 square feet (1,200 m^{2}) of retail and 100,000 square feet (9,300 m^{2}) of amenity space. The amenities include a dog pit, game rooms, theaters, basketball court, swimming pools, and fitness center. There is also a 208-space parking garage.

Lloyd Goldman submitted plans for the building to the New York City Department of Buildings in March 2022. The building topped out during July 2024.

== See also ==
- List of tallest buildings in New York City
- List of tallest buildings in Queens
