= Raúl de Armas =

Cuban-born architect

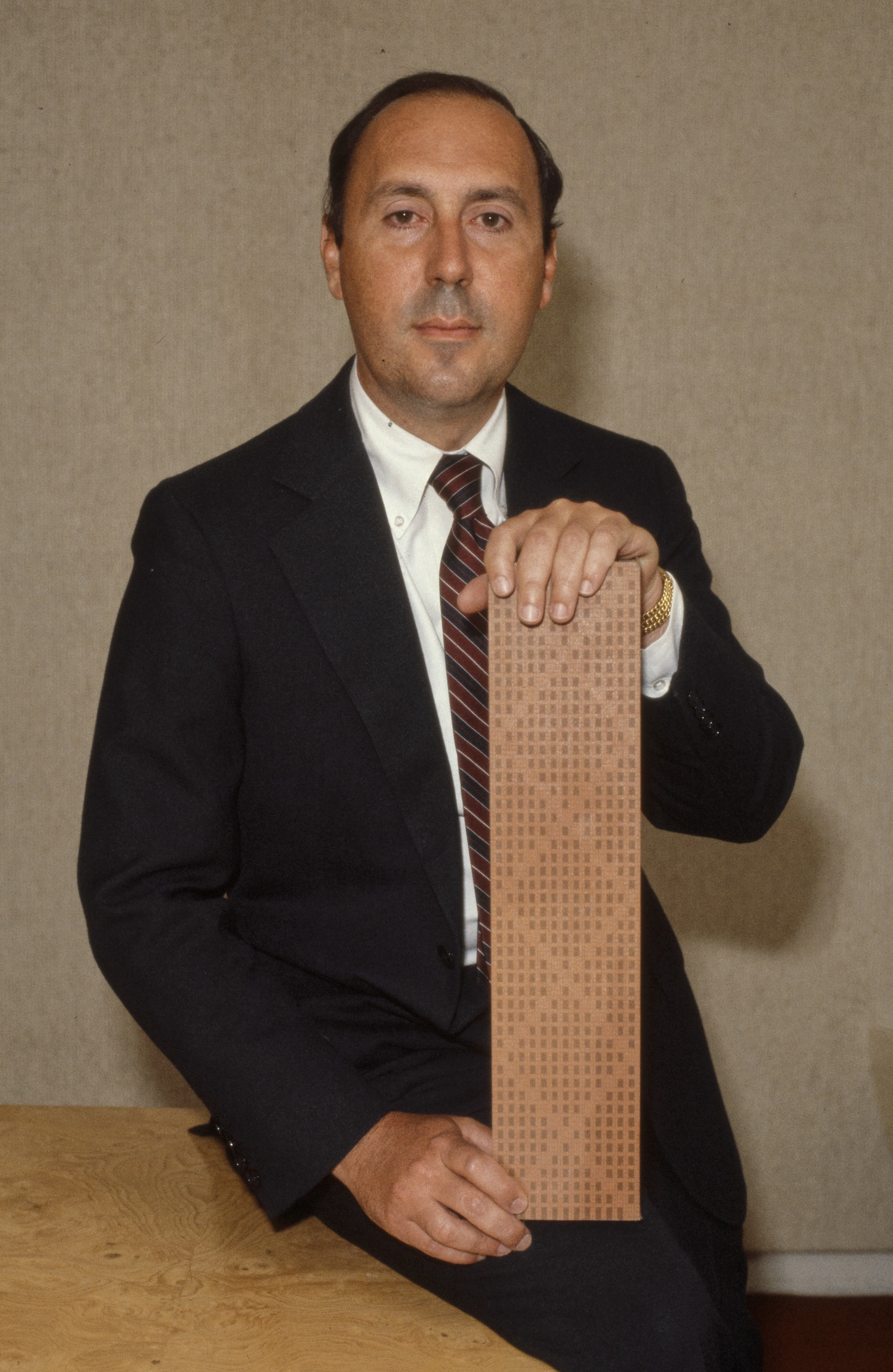
- Born: Cuba
- Education: Cornell University
- Occupation: Architect

Raúl de Armas (born 1941) is a Cuban-born architect who has designed and completed many major buildings in the United States, Europe, Canada, and the Middle East in his career of more than 35 years, winning numerous design awards.

De Armas came to New York in 1958 at the age of 17. He studied architecture at Cornell University.

Until he resigned in 1991, he was a partner at Skidmore, Owings & Merrill in charge of interior design for their New York office. He designed the Citicorp Building in New York City, at the time the tallest building in the city outside of Manhattan. Since 1992, he has been a partner in the firm of MdeAS Architects (formerly Moed de Armas), which he helped found, in New York City.

== Awards ==
- CINTAS Foundation Lifetime Achievement Award, 2016–17 "Cornell AAP Alumni, Raul de Armas". Cornell University. 2018. Archived from the original on October 10, 2019.
- American Institute of Architects AIA Twenty-five Year Award, 2010 – Haj Terminal/King Abdul Aziz International Airport
- Salvadori Center Founder's Award for Excellence in Design, 2008 – Moed de Armas & Shannon
- Institute of Business Designers Award, Citation, 1992 – Knoll Palio Collection
- INARCH, Citation, 1990 – San Benigno Torre Nord ("Il Matitone"), Genoa, Italy
- Interior Design Awards, First Place, Independent Restaurants, 1988 – Palio Restaurant, New York
- American Institute of Architects, New York Chapter, Citation, 1986 – Irving Trust Operations Center, New York
- American Institute of Architects, New York Chapter, Citation, 1986 – Prudential at Princeton "Enerplex"
- Interiors Magazine "Designer of the Year", 1984, – projects including Irving Trust Operations Center and Manufacturers Hanover Trust Corporation Headquarters
- Aga Khan Award for Architecture, 1983 – planning of the Haj Terminal/King Abdul Aziz International Airport
- Concrete Industry Board Annual Award, 1983 – 780 Third Avenue, New York
- Fifth Avenue Association Commercial Building Award 1983 – Park Avenue Plaza, New York
- Reliance Development Group Award, Distinguished Architecture, 1982 – Park Avenue Plaza, New York
- Progressive Architecture award, 1981
