= Skyline Tower (Queens) =

Skyscraper in Queens, New York

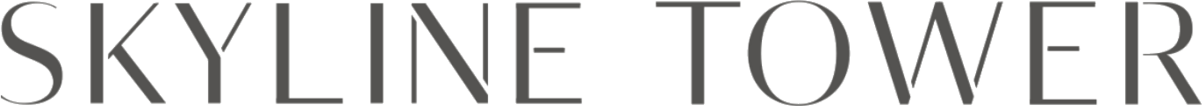

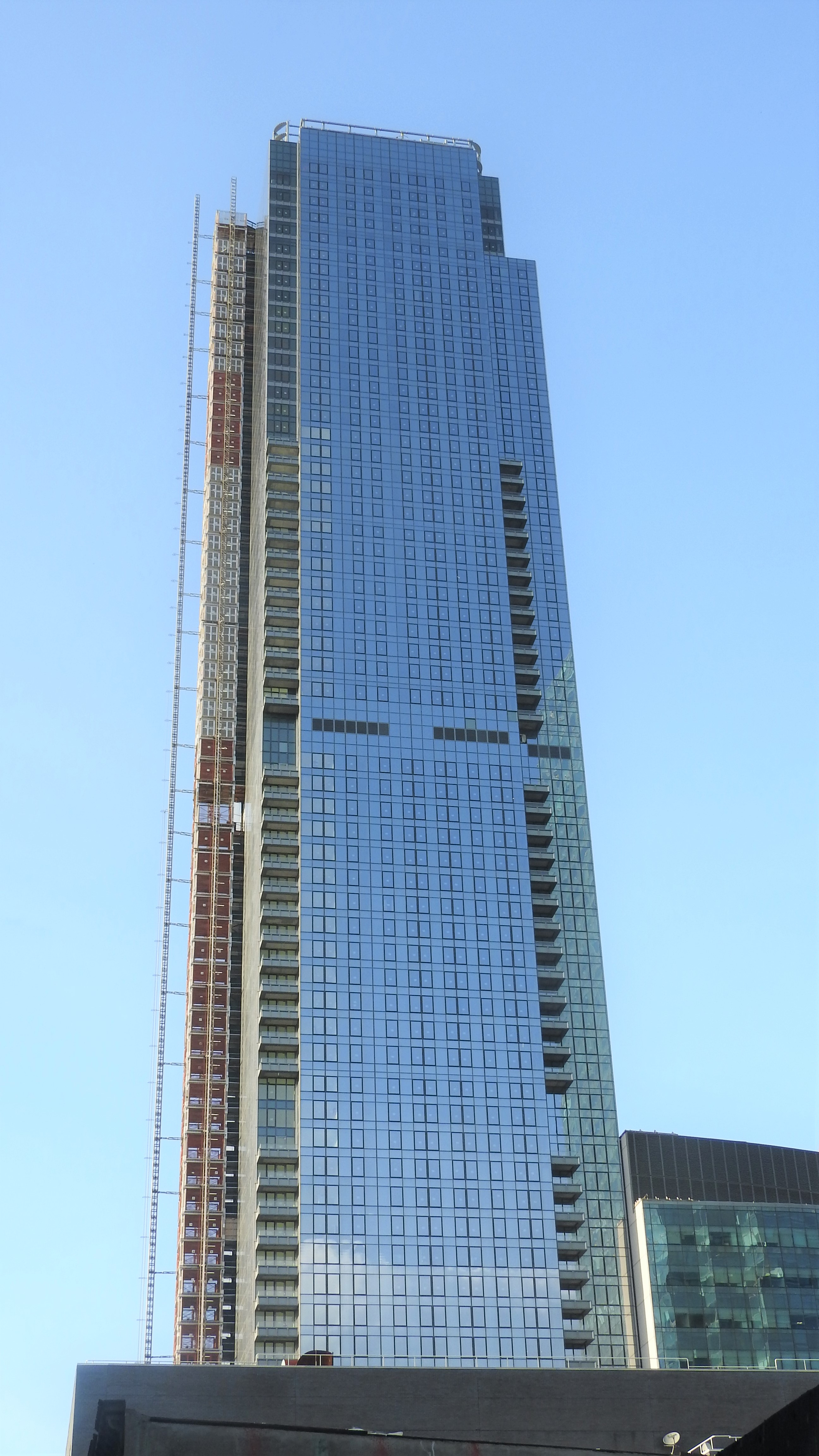
- Skyline Tower in 2020
- Interactive map of the Skyline Tower area
- Former names: Court Square City View Tower

General information
- Status: Completed
- Type: Residential
- Location: 23-15 44th Drive; Long Island City, NY 11101
- Coordinates: 40.747987°N 73.944473°W
- Construction started: 2017
- Completed: 2021
- Cost: $700 million

Height
- Roof: 778 ft (237 m)

Technical details
- Floor count: 67
- Floor area: 762,000 square feet (70,800 m^{2})

Design and construction
- Architect: Hill West Architects
- Developer: Risland US, Chris Xu, and United Construction & Development Group

Website
- skylinetower-lic.com

Skyline Tower, previously known as Court Square City View Tower, is a residential skyscraper in the Long Island City neighborhood of Queens in New York City. The building topped out in October 2019, surpassing One Court Square to become the tallest building in Queens at 762 feet (232 m). For two years, it was also the tallest building on Long Island; in October 2021, the building was surpassed in height when the Brooklyn Tower topped out. It was completed in July 2021.

== Architecture ==
The tower contains 802 condos spread across the building's 68 floors. Rather than target traditional buyers of luxury Manhattan condominiums, the development hopes to attract buyers looking for more space at a lower price point and willing to accept an outer borough location. As such, the units range in price from $500,000 to $4 million, significantly lower than comparable units in Manhattan. Amenities include a fitness center with a swimming pool, a sauna and spa, a yoga room, laundry room, a children’s playroom, and multiple lounges for residents. The developers also committed $16 million to constructing a new entrance for the New York City Subway's Court Square–23rd Street station at the base of the building.

== History ==
Citigroup had controlled the site since the 1980s, having taken ownership of it during the development of One Court Square and the smaller Two Court Square. Though Citi had planned a third office tower on the site, by 2015 the company decided it did not need the potential space and that the land was more valuable as a development site. As a result, Citi hired JLL to market the site and several months later sold the parcel to Flushing, Queens-based developer Chris Xu for $143 million.

In February 2016, permits were initially filed for a 79-story tower that would reach a height of 963 feet (294 m). However, due to Long Island City's proximity to LaGuardia Airport, the Federal Aviation Administration ruled that the building could rise no higher than 762 feet (232 m) without posing a threat to landing airplanes. As a result, the development was downsized to its current height of 762 feet (232 m). In September 2016, developer Chris Jiashu Xu refinanced the development site with a $100 million loan from the Bank of China.

Foundation work at the site began in late 2017. In July 2018, the developers secured $502 million in financing from a consortium of banks led by JPMorgan Chase, the largest-ever financing for a private real estate development in Queens. By the end of 2018, foundation work was complete and the building had risen to the sixth floor. The project launched sales in May 2019, targeting a sellout of over $1 billion, a record for Queens. The building topped-out in October 2019.

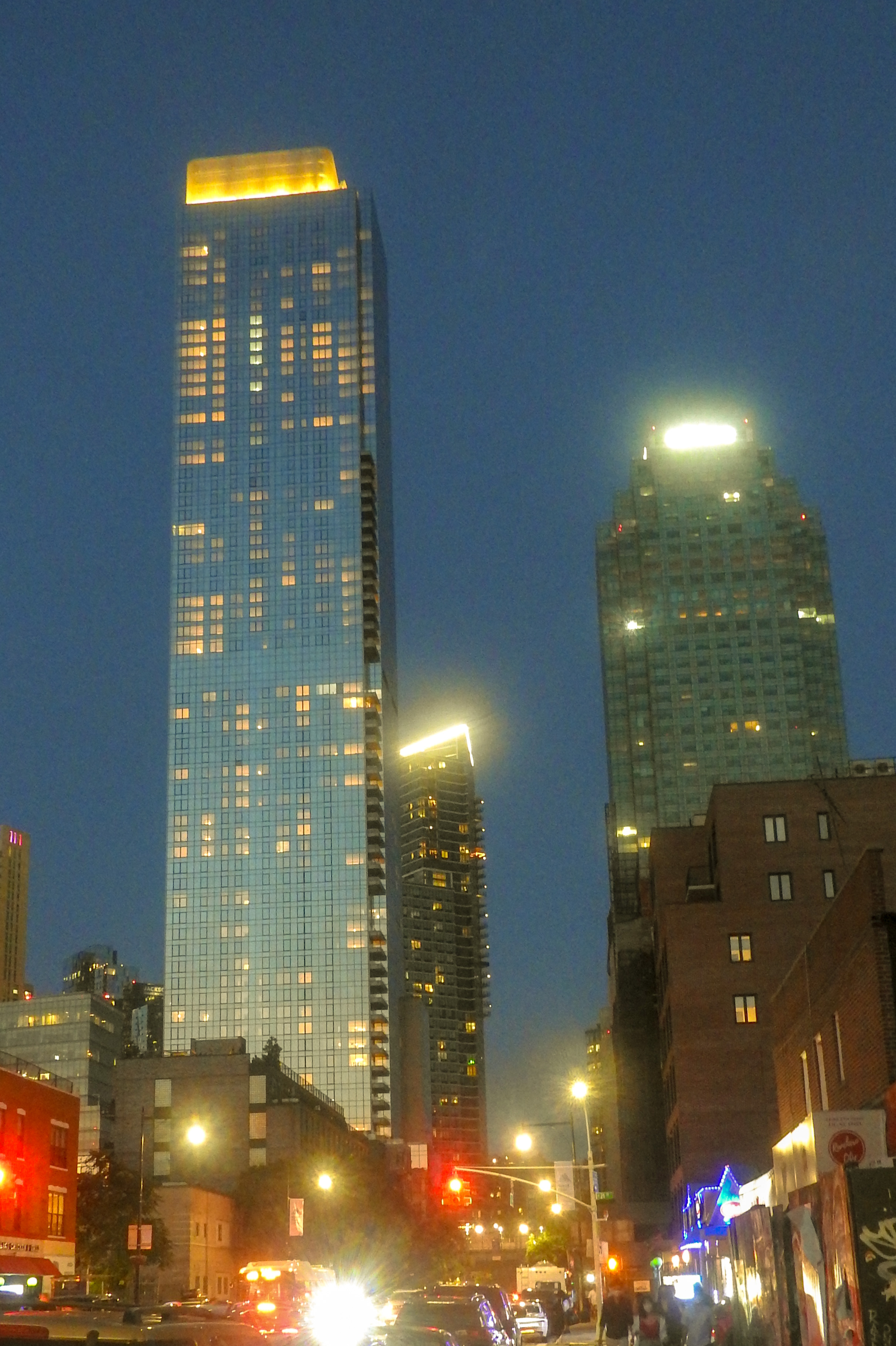
From the west, July 2021

The Skyline Tower was finished in July 2021. The building's developers had added an elevator at the Court Square–23rd Street station and were planning another elevator in the future. Half the condos at the building had been sold by September 2021. During the year, the Skyline Tower had sold more units than any other luxury development in the city. By June 2024, nine-tenths of the apartments had been sold.

== Controversies ==
In July 2022, ninety buyers of units within Skyline Tower filed a complaint with the New York Attorney General that the building's success had been exaggerated to prospective buyers, citing year-end financial statements displaying only 42 percent occupancy versus the 60 percent occupancy claimed by the building's sales and marketing agent. The brokerage disputed their assertion, stating that the 60 percent figure included units under contract.

Beyond the alleged misrepresentation of sales numbers, owners have complained of incomplete construction, delayed repairs, flooding, structural defects, and a lack of amenities. The original complaint also referred to flyers circulated by building staff who were demanding fair pay and benefits.

During its construction, in 2019, the Metropolitan Transportation Authority implicated the Skyline Tower's developers after the Court Square subway station flooded. The localized deluge, which nearly swept one passenger onto the tracks, was caused by the collapse of a plywood construction wall following a rainstorm.

== See also ==
- List of tallest buildings in New York City
- List of tallest buildings in Queens
