= North Shore Towers =

Residential skyscrapers in Queens, New York

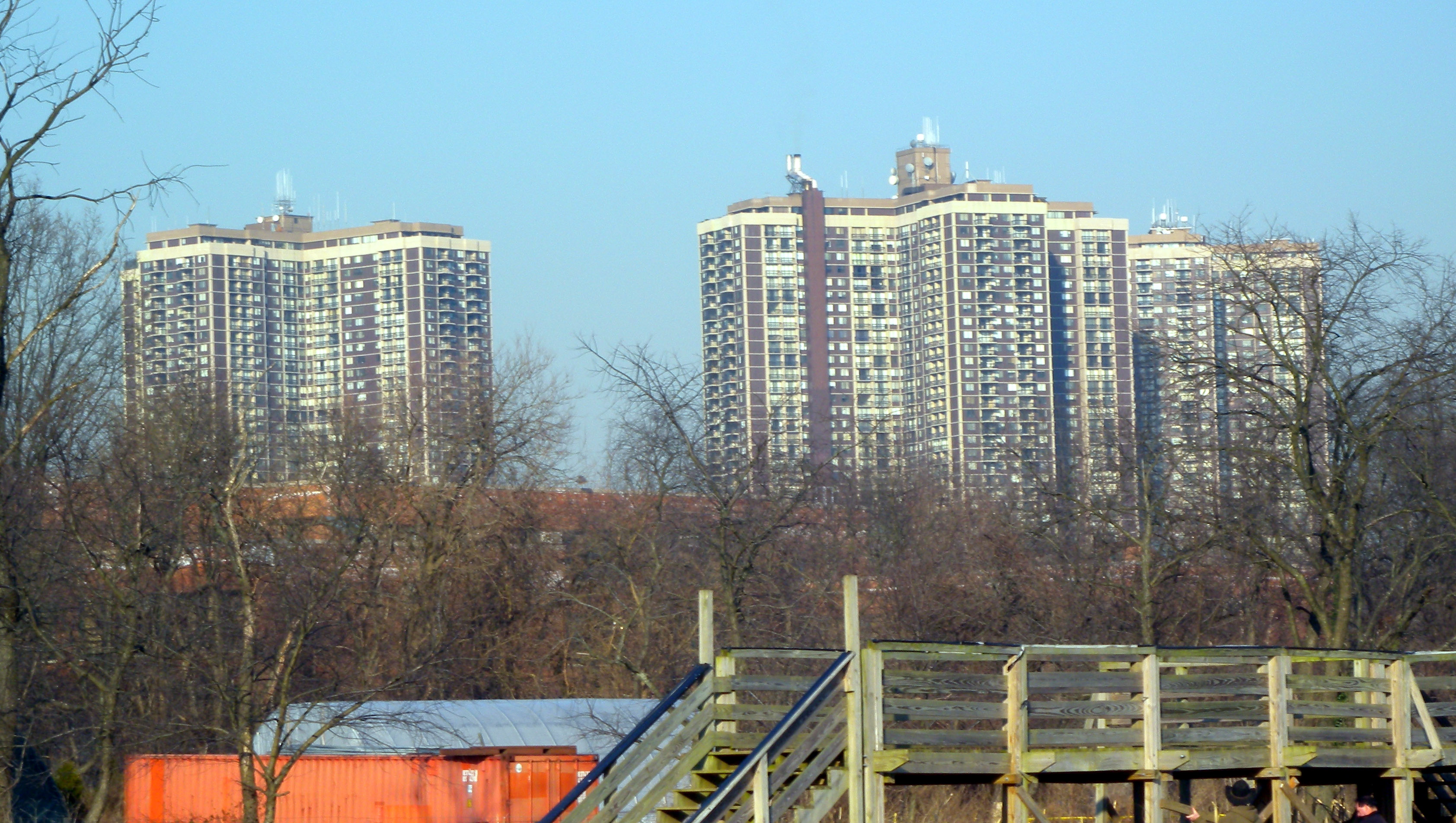
- North Shore Towers, seen from the Grand Central Parkway

General information
- Status: Completed
- Type: Residential, retail
- Location: 272–40 Grand Central Parkway; Floral Park, New York, US
- Coordinates: 40°45′26.58″N 73°42′54″W
- Groundbreaking: 1971
- Completed: 1975
- Owner: North Shore Towers Apartments, Incorporated (Cooperative)

Height
- Architectural: 370 ft (110 m) (Beaumont Tower); 346 ft (105 m) (Amherst Tower); 346 ft (105 m) (Coleridge Tower)

Technical details
- Size: 3 buildings 110 acres (45 ha)
- Floor count: 34 per building
- Floor area: 3,520,000 sq ft (327,000 m^{2})
- Lifts/elevators: 24 total

Design and construction
- Architects: A.H. Salkowitz & Carl Heimberger
- Developer: Sigmund Sommer
- Engineer: Robert Rosenwasser (structural); Sidney Barbanel (mechanical)
- Main contractor: Sigmund Sommer Construction; Mandel and Corsini Mechanical; Forest Electric

Other information
- Number of units: 1,844 residential units; 22 retail units

Website
- http://www.northshoretowers.com

The North Shore Towers and Country Club is a three-building residential cooperative located in the Floral Park neighborhood in Queens, New York, United States. The complex is located next to the Long Island Jewish Medical Center, near the city's border with Nassau County.

The three constituent residential buildings—Amherst, Beaumont, and Coleridge Towers—which sit on a 110-acre (45 ha) property, are some of the tallest structures in Queens with 34 floors each. The towers are constructed on the highest point of land in Queens County, a hill located 258 feet (79 m) above sea level. This hill is part of the terminal moraine of the last glacial period. The hill is the second-lowest of the high points in all 62 of New York's counties. The North Shore Towers complex contains 1,844 apartments ranging from studios to three-bedroom apartments.

The North Shore Towers complex has an 18-hole golf course and its own power plant that produces electricity independent of local power companies. The community also has an indoor shopping concourse that connects the three residential buildings with 22 retail units, as well as fitness centers that include five swimming pools and five tennis courts.

The North Shore Towers is the only gated residential community in New York with its own zip code, 11005. The zip code is addressed as Floral Park even though the towers are neither in nor adjacent to the Floral Park, Queens neighborhood or the Village of Floral Park. Queens postal zones do not reflect neighborhood or even political boundaries.

== History ==
The neighborhood where the North Shore Towers were built was a rural, unnamed section of Flushing, part of a 20,000-acre (8,100 ha) land grant to Massachusetts settlers. In 1923, the Glen Oaks Golf Club was built, created on 167 acres (68 ha) purchased from William K. Vanderbilt II's country estate. By 1971, the golf course was replaced by the North Shore Towers. The North Shore Towers were constructed in Glen Oaks because of Queens's lax zoning rules, which are less restrictive than those in Nassau and Suffolk Counties in Long Island. Some Glen Oaks residents, mostly single-home dwellers, protested the construction of the North Shore Towers because they were afraid it would dominate the horizon. However, it was a highly anticipated "big Queens project" for most New Yorkers.

The North Shore Towers were originally built as rentals, but in 1985 a filing with the New York State Attorney General's office sought to convert the complex into cooperative apartments. At the time, this was touted as the most expensive conversion in New York City's history. In 1987, all but 150 units of the North Shore Towers complex were successfully converted to a co-op under a noneviction plan.

The buildings are considered fireproof by the New York City Fire Department because partitions between individual units are designed to stop the spread of flames, also known as compartmentalization. This is evidenced by a 2004 fire caused by a cigarette, where no one was seriously injured because the fire was self-contained.

=== Energy independence ===
The North Shore Towers complex has a self-generating power plant that produces electricity independent of local power companies, which as of December 31, 1996 had an 8.9 megawatts (11,935 hp) capacity. This was noted during the New York City Blackout of 1977 when the entire city was without power but lights were still visible in the North Shore Towers. During the Northeast blackout of 2003, the North Shore Towers continued to produce electricity unaffected. This resulted in extensive media coverage on the co-op's self-sufficiency with regard to energy. After seeing this news coverage of North Shore Towers' ability to produce power during the blackout, city tax collectors sent energy tax bills to North Shore Towers and the Penn South co-op in Chelsea, Manhattan. The tax bills were for $1 million each, representing unpaid fuel taxes going back 20 years, even though both co-ops produce their own power. Mayor Michael Bloomberg, Councilman David Weprin (D-Queens), then Councilwoman Christine Quinn (D-Manhattan), and other city officials worked towards settling the tax bills and removing future energy taxes for the co-ops. Then Council Speaker Gifford Miller (D-Manhattan) commented that such co-ops "should be rewarded, not punished for providing their own energy."

In 2000, a North Shore Towers resident noticed a zip code error when making an online purchase. After further investigation in 2001, it was determined that the North Shore Towers was one of four zip codes that were mistakenly charged a Nassau County sales tax of 8.5% instead of the New York City sales tax of 8.25% because the zip codes cross the city line. Residents argued that New York City should receive their tax dollars and not Nassau County. This error was corrected by late 2001.

== Description ==
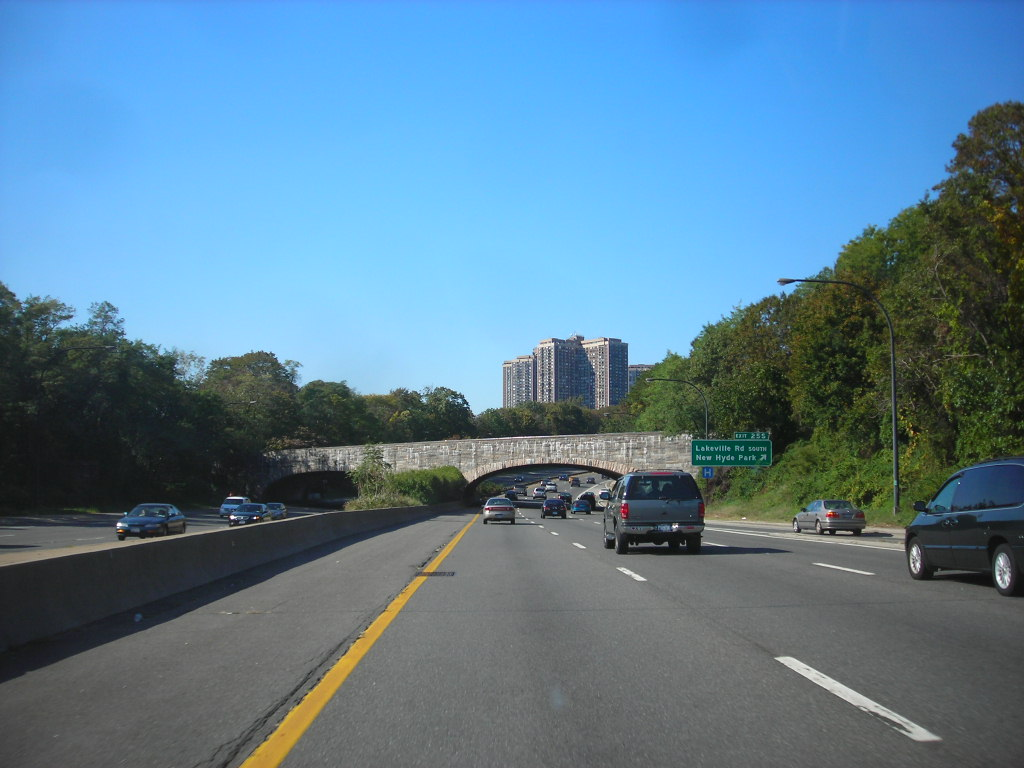
Seen from the east along Northern State Parkway

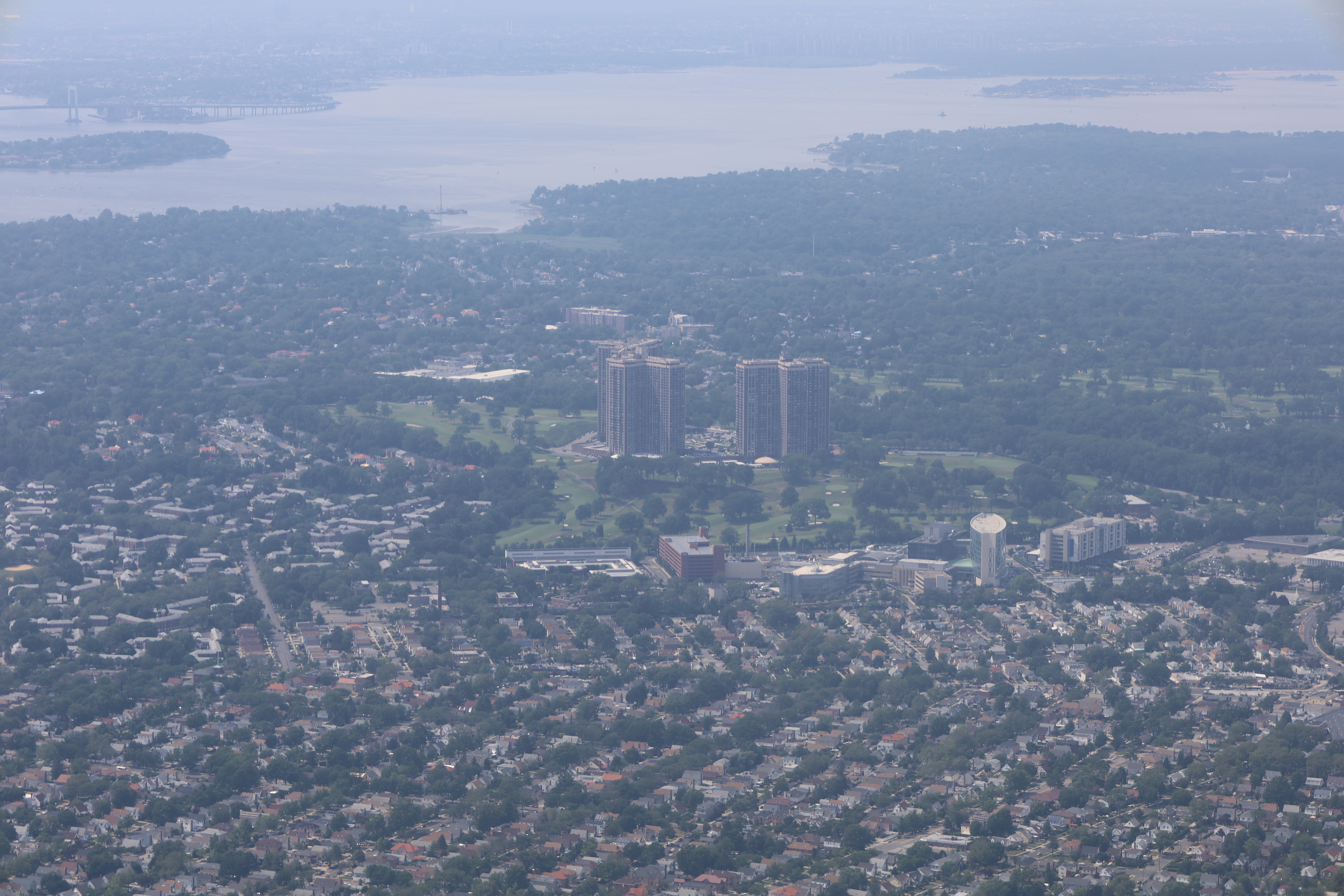
Aerial view in 2021

=== Amenities ===
As a gated community and private country club, the North Shore Towers offers a variety of amenities for residents and guests. The on-premises security is always present at the front gate guard booth and in the dispatch office. There are also security patrols 24-hours a day. The on-site management company is Charles H. Greenthal Management Corp., which also manages upscale residential buildings in Manhattan. Superintendents, maintenance staff, doormen, and concierge are staffed in each building 24/7. The North Shore Towers has been described as "where the city meets the suburbs", given its location at the eastern edge of Queens and its suburban feel. As of February 2011, the average unit in the Towers sold for $381,099.

The North Shore Towers Country Club offers several areas dedicated to recreational sport, including an 18-hole, par 70 private golf course, five tennis courts, basketball court, shuffleboard court, ping pong tables, billiards room, card rooms, and a clubhouse. The health club includes five indoor and outdoor pools, a 20-person jacuzzi, fully equipped gym with personal trainers, aerobics classes, saunas, steam rooms, lockers, and showers.

The three buildings that compose the North Shore Towers are connected by an indoor, underground arcade with nine residential units and seven staff residential rooms. This 27,831-square-foot (2,585.6 m^{2}) mall includes a 460-seat movie theater, restaurant, bank branch, supermarket, dry cleaner, laundromat, fruit and flower shop, pharmacy, boutique, spa, beauty salon, golf pro shop, convention center with catering hall, videographer, library, art gallery, public lounge rooms, courtyard garden with snack bar, children's playground, dentist, and notary. North Shore Towers has three in-house television channels and two monthly newspapers, the independently published Tower Times, and the North Shore Towers Courier. Complementary flu shots are given to residents each fall. Leisure and hobbies at the North Shore Towers also include "day and evening trips, cultural events, book clubs, walking clubs, photography clubs, gardening clubs, concerts, guest speaking events, and holiday dinner dances", according to The New York Times. Many of the clubs are developed not by the board on the North Shore Towers, but by the residents themselves.

There is above ground parking and three levels of underground parking available, able to accommodate 2,363 cars in a subterranean garage and 126 above ground. A car wash, detail, and repair service is available to residents in the underground parking lot. The concierge service offers courtesy bus rides to local shopping destinations. The North Shore Towers are served by the QM6 and QM36 express buses to Manhattan, operated by MTA Regional Bus Operations.

=== Board of directors ===
The North Shore Towers Board of Directors consists of nine directors, each elected for 2-year terms. Each of the three buildings at North Shore Towers has its own on-site election district. Voting for both United States government elections and in-house board elections are done on the premises. North Shore Towers regularly contracts an outside election company for such occasions. The North Shore Towers has an annual budget of $43 million. Prospective residents must be interviewed by the co-op's board of directors through a serious screening process.

=== Notable visitors ===
The North Shore Towers Political Action Committee frequently organizes events to show support for lawmakers and to raise awareness on a number of important issues. Politicians running for office often visit the North Shore Towers during their campaigns in an attempt to win the vote of their residents, who tend to be retired, white, and Jewish. Politicians who have campaigned and spoken at the North Shore Towers include U.S. Congressman Gary Ackerman, U.S. Senator Joe Lieberman, New York City Mayor Rudy Giuliani, U.S. Senator Hillary Clinton, New York City Mayor Michael Bloomberg, U.S. Senator Chuck Schumer, U.S. Congressman Thomas Suozzi, U.S. Congressman Anthony Weiner, State Comptroller Thomas DiNapoli, State Senator Frank Padavan, State Assemblywoman Ann-Margaret Carrozza, New York City Councilman Mark Weprin, Speaker of the City Council Christine Quinn, New York City Comptroller William Thompson, New York City Finance Chairman Councilman David Weprin and New York City Commissioner of Finance Martha Stark.

== See also ==
- List of tallest buildings in Queens
- Glen Oaks
- Lake Success
