= Church Missions House =

Historic building in Manhattan, New York

- U.S. National Register of Historic Places
- New York State Register of Historic Places
- New York City Landmark
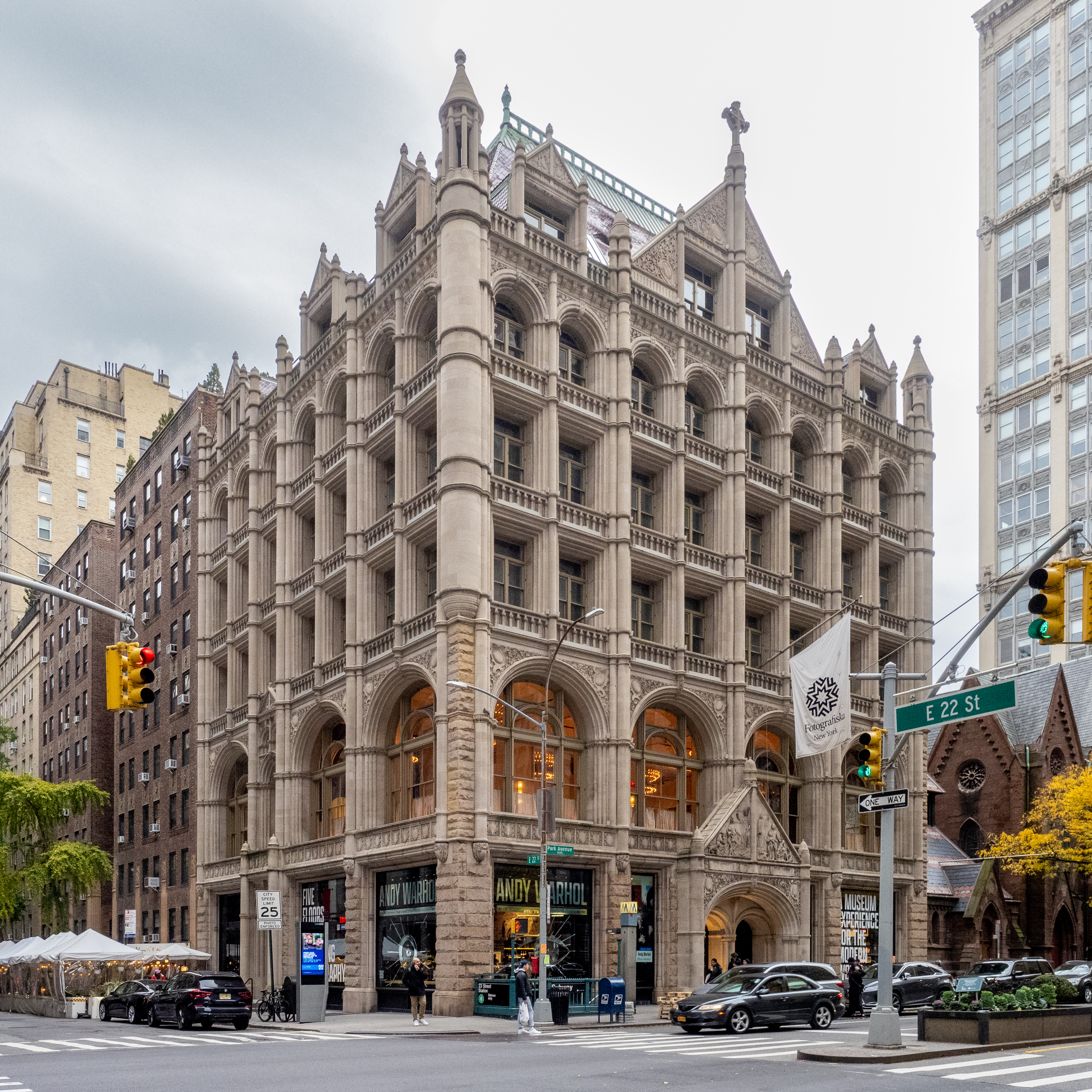
- Location: 281 Park Ave. South; Manhattan, New York, US
- Coordinates: 40°44′21″N 73°59′12″W
- Built: 1892
- Architects: Robert Williams Gibson; Edward J. Neville Stent
- Architectural style: Late 19th and Early 20th Century Revivals; Flemish style
- NRHP reference No.: 82003370
- NYSRHP No.: 06101.001680
- NYCL No.: 1044

Significant dates
- Added to NRHP: June 3, 1982
- Designated NYSRHP: April 9, 1982
- Designated NYCL: September 11, 1979

Church Missions House (also known as 281 Park Avenue South) is a historic building at Park Avenue South and East 22nd Street in the Gramercy Park neighborhood of Manhattan in New York City. Part of an area once known as "Charity Row", the building was designed by Robert W. Gibson and Edward J. Neville Stent, with a steel structure and medieval-inspired facade. The design was inspired by the town halls of Haarlem and medieval Amsterdam. Church Missions House is so named because it was the headquarters of the Episcopal Church's Domestic and Foreign Missionary Society for much of the 20th century.

The facade is made of granite at the ground story and Indiana Limestone on the other stories. The facade's composition is based on the arrangement of the superstructure, which is arranged as a grid of rectangles. The main entrance is through a porch at the center of the Park Avenue facade. Inside, the building contains at least 33,600 square feet (3,120 m^{2}) of space.

The Domestic and Foreign Missionary Society sought to develop a dedicated headquarters for much of the 19th century. The Church Missions House building was built between 1892 and 1894. The building was sold in 1963 to the Federation of Protestant Welfare Agencies (FPWA). The New York City Landmarks Preservation Commission designated Church Missions House as a landmark in 1979, and it was added to the National Register of Historic Places in 1982. The FPWA moved out of the building in 2015. Fotografiska New York, an offshoot of the Swedish photography museum Fotografiska, occupied it from 2019 to 2024.

== Site ==
Church Missions House is at 281 Park Avenue South (Note: The address was originally 281 Fourth Avenue. The old address number was kept when the section of Fourth Avenue between 17th and 32nd Streets was renamed Park Avenue South in 1959.) in the Gramercy Park neighborhood of Manhattan in New York City. The rectangular land lot is on the southeast corner of 22nd Street and Park Avenue South, covering approximately 5,600 square feet (520 m^{2}). The lot has a frontage of 70 feet (21 m) on 22nd Street to the north and 80 feet (24 m) on Park Avenue to the west. Church Missions House is adjacent to Calvary Church to the south and is directly across from the United Charities Building to the north and 300 Park Avenue South to the northwest. Other nearby buildings include Gramercy Park Hotel to the southeast, the Russell Sage Foundation Building to the east, 121 East 22nd to the northeast, and Madison Square Park Tower and 304 Park Avenue South to the northwest. Right outside the building is an entrance to the New York City Subway's 23rd Street–Baruch College station, served by the 6 and <6> trains.

Many of the surrounding buildings are commercial loft structures similar in design to Church Missions House. During the late 19th and 20th centuries, Church Missions House was part of "Charity Row", a three-block area around Park Avenue and 22nd Street with the headquarters of charitable institutions. The New York Society for the Prevention of Cruelty to Children, the Xavier Society for the Blind, United Cerebral Palsy of New York City, and the Russell Sage Foundation were among the groups headquartered in Charity Row. When Church Missions House was built, the United Charities Building, the American Society for the Prevention of Cruelty to Animals (ASPCA), and the Bank for Savings were all being developed on nearby sites.

== Architecture ==
The six-story building was designed by Robert W. Gibson and Edward J. Neville Stent for the Episcopal Church's Domestic and Foreign Missionary Society. The extent to which either man was involved in the project is unclear, but Gibson was known as an architect of Episcopal churches in New York state during the 1890s, while Stent specialized in interior designs of churches around the same time. The design was inspired by the town halls of Haarlem and Medieval Amsterdam.

=== Facade ===
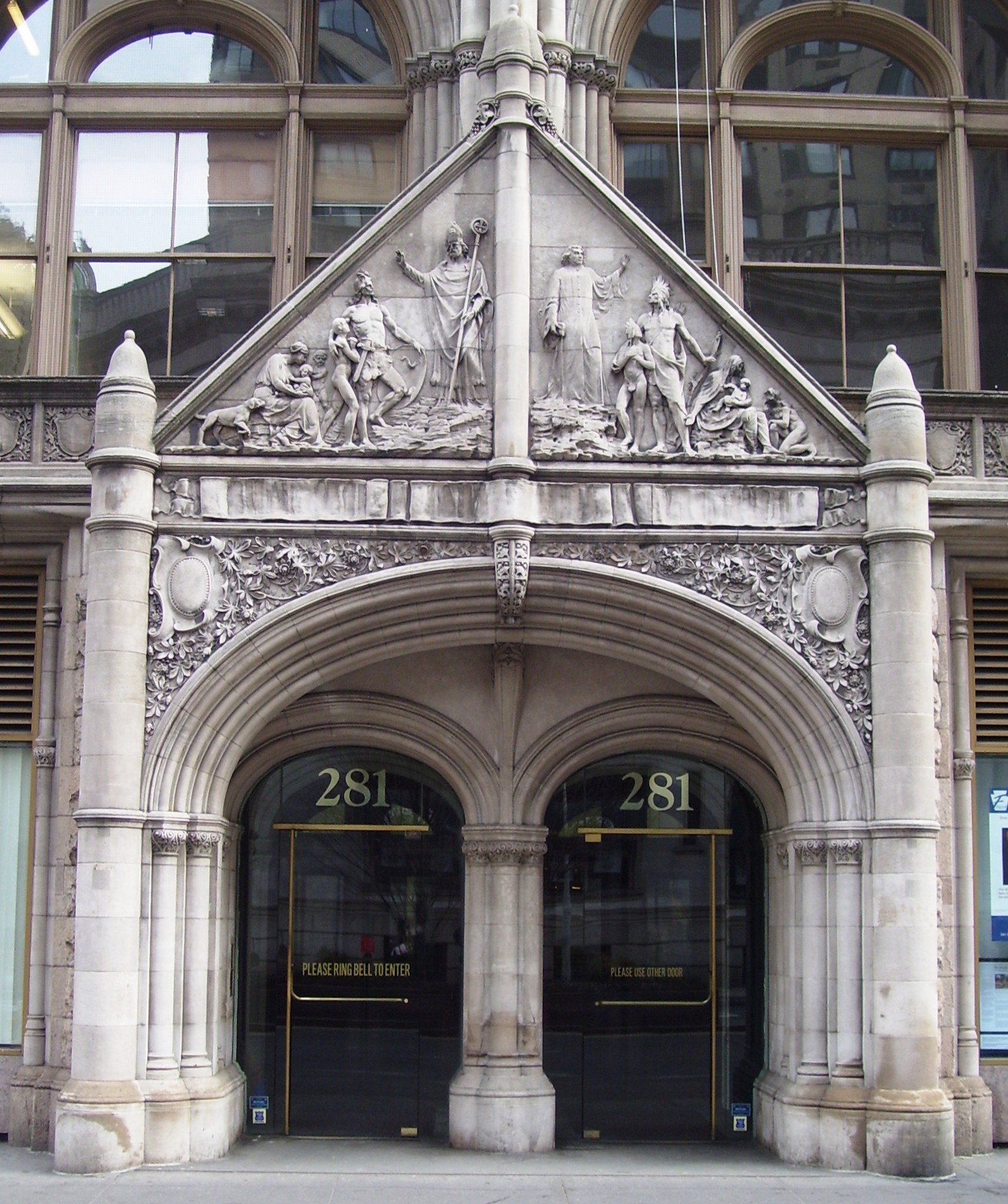
Entrance to the building

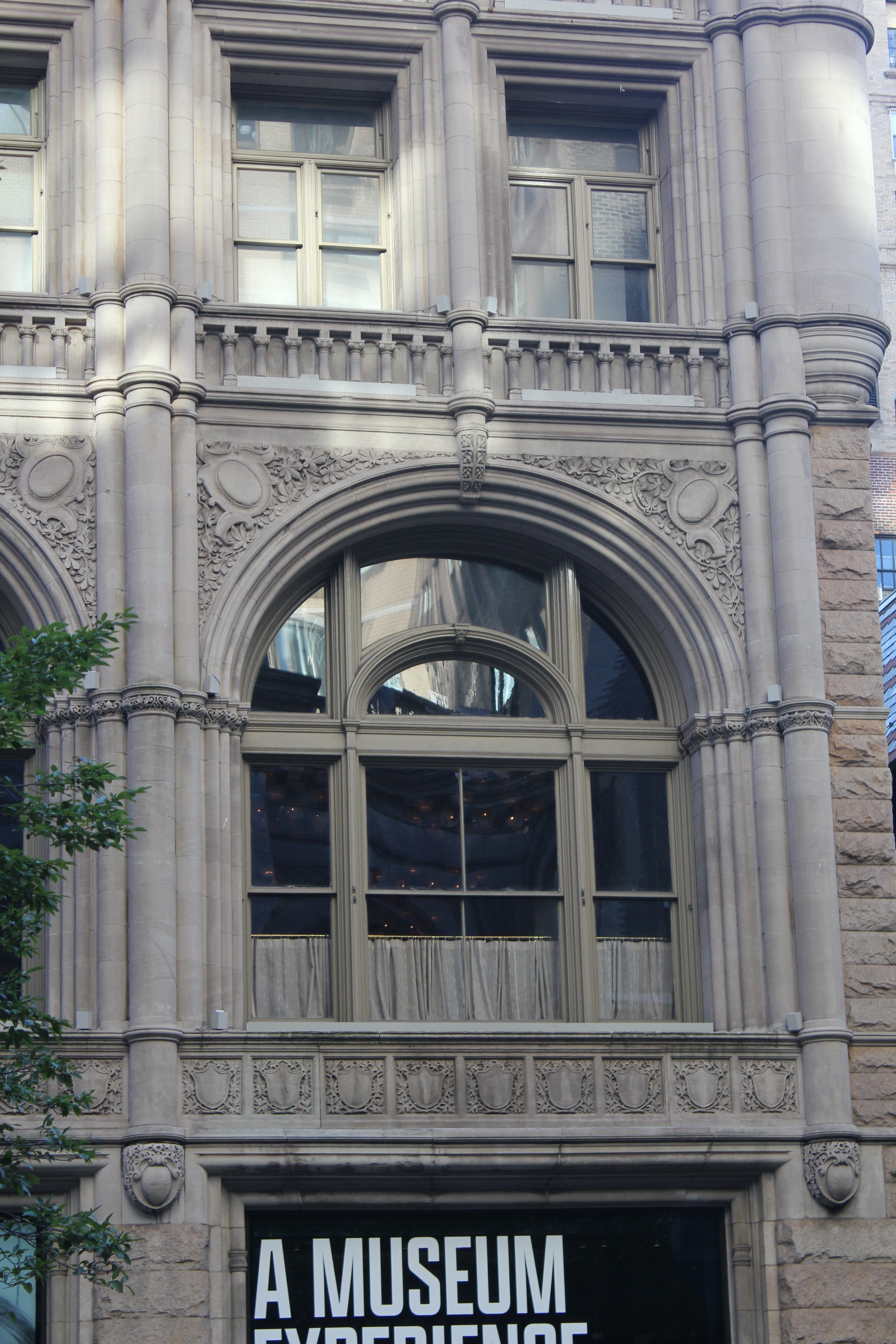
Second-story window

The facade is made of granite at the ground story and Indiana Limestone on the other stories. The original plans had called for granite on the first two stories and terracotta on the other stories. The facade's composition is based on the arrangement of the superstructure, which is arranged as a grid of rectangles. At each corner of the building is a tourelle that extends the height of the building. The rest of the facade is subdivided by vertical columns, which separate the facade into bays of openings, and horizontal spandrels, which separate windows on each story. The Park Avenue facade is divided into eight bays while the 22nd Street facade is divided into seven bays. The bays on the lowest two stories are paired; the 22nd Street facade is asymmetrical due to the arrangement of bays there. According to the AIA Guide to New York City, the Medieval-inspired facade was "equal to buildings of the Flemish and Dutch Renaissance."

The main entrance is through a porch at the center of the Park Avenue facade. It consists of an archway, above which is a triangular pediment with a tympanum inside a bas-relief. The bas-relief is based on a scene from Christus Consolator, in which the ill are blessed by Christ. On the tympanum itself, the left side shows Augustine of Canterbury preaching to British people in the sixth century, while the right side shows Samuel Seabury, the first American bishop of the Episcopal Church. Edward J. N. Stent carved the tympanum. The spandrels at the top corners of the arch are decorated with icons inspired by 16th-century motifs. Originally, a screen with large wrought-iron gates was at the Park Avenue entrance. The remainder of the ground floor contains storefront windows, which are flanked by piers of rock-faced granite.

The second story consists of an arcade with double-width arches that mostly correspond to the storefront windows below. At the top corners of the windows are spandrels with foliate carvings. The third and fourth stories are composed of rectangular window openings. The fifth floor has round-arched openings that represent part of a triforium in a medieval church. The sixth floor has a tiled mansard roof with dormer windows. The central dormer on Park Avenue has a gable with a stone cross; it is flanked by a pair of smaller dormers. The center gable has a statue of St. Paul. A copper cresting and skylights run above the roof.

=== Interior ===
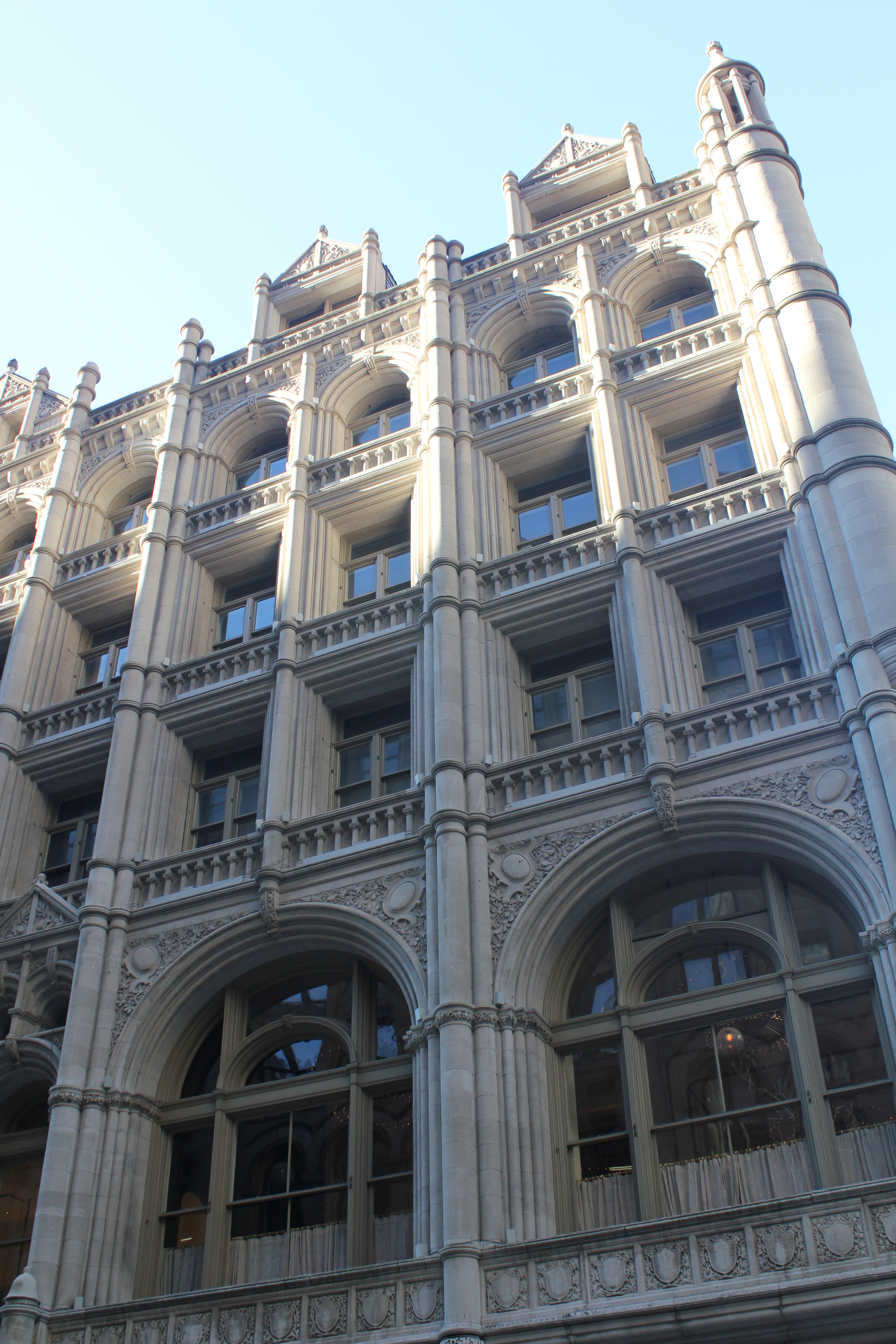
The facade seen from 22nd Street

Sources disagree on the amount of space Church Missions House contains. According to the New York City Department of City Planning, the building has a gross floor area of 33,600 square feet (3,120 m^{2}). The Wall Street Journal cites the building as having 36,749 square feet (3,414.1 m^{2}) of usable space, while other sources describe the building as having 45,000 square feet (4,200 m^{2}). Church Missions House has several features that were used in the early skyscrapers of New York City during the late 19th century. The building has a self-supporting steel superstructure filled with brick, and it had an elevator and architectural terracotta fireproofing from the outset. It predated the American Surety Building, the first skyscraper in New York City with a superstructure made entirely of steel, by two years. As of December 2019, all six floors of the building are occupied by Fotografiska New York, a Swedish photography museum. The ground floor has a cafe and a gift shop.

The storefronts facing the streets were initially rented to publishers of religious media. Originally, the second story had a hallway made of polished Florentine mosaic as well as offices with parquet floors. The second floor also had rooms for the board, library, Women's Auxiliary, and chapel. The chapel, connected to the board room and library, had a chancel, altar, reredos, organ loft, robing room, and stained-glass window. The space has a 20-foot (6.1 m) ceiling Since 2019, the second story has been occupied by Veronika, a 150-seat restaurant operated by Stephen Starr. The restaurant incorporates some of the historic stained-glass windows that were previously mounted on the facade. The space also contains a mural by Dean Barger, brass chandeliers, wood doorways and floors, and mohair chairs.

As designed, the upper stories were intended for offices and studios. The halls were wainscoted in marble and tiled with mosaic, while passageways were made of stone and iron. Fotografiska New York operates galleries on the third through fifth stories. The sixth story has an event space with a skylight and a vaulted ceiling. When the building was renovated for Fotografiska New York, some low-height ceilings were removed and the original steel beams were revealed. Walls were built 3 feet (0.91 m) behind the facade's stained-glass windows so the natural light did not interfere with the exhibits.

== History ==
The Domestic and Foreign Missionary Society had been founded in Philadelphia in 1821. The Domestic and Foreign Missionary Society moved to New York City in 1835. The Foreign Committee took space at 115 Franklin Street in lower Manhattan, while the Domestic Committee was housed nearby at White and Center Streets. The Episcopal Church sought to combine the offices of the two committees as early as 1836. The Society had rented office space at 281 Broadway near Chambers Street by 1840, and the committees both had several headquarters during the next decade and a half. By 1853, it had opened offices at the Bible House, where it remained for four decades. In 1864, the Society appointed the Committee on Church Missions House to research sites for a new headquarters. The effort stalled again through the 1880s.

=== Construction ===
William S. Langford was elected to Society leadership in 1885 and visited the headquarters of the Society for Promoting Christian Knowledge in London three years later. Upon his return to the United States, he wrote to the Society's Board of Managers that a church missions headquarters was needed. In October 1888, a bishop, two presbyters, and six laymen were appointed to a committee to select the site and raise money through subscriptions. Prominent businessmen William Bayard Cutting, William G. Low, and Cornelius Vanderbilt were all on the committee. By May 1889, the committee had identified a site near Fourth (now Park) Avenue and 22nd Street. The site was selected because it was on a major avenue; it was near 23rd Street, where a crosstown streetcar line operated; it was next to Calvary Church, a major Episcopal church; and Madison Square and Gramercy parks were both nearby.

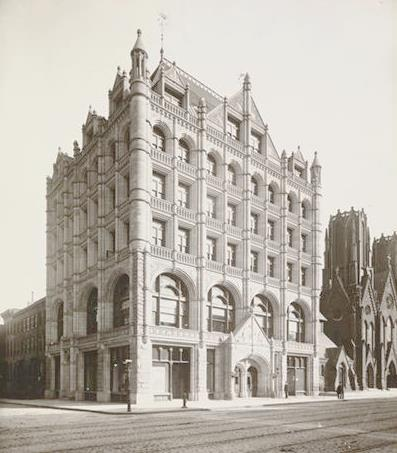
Church Missions House, ca. 1905

Four alternative plans for a seven-story Missions House were presented to the Society's Board of Missions in September 1889. Church architect Robert W. Gibson was asked to review the plans. The following month, the Board of Missions approved the project. The winning plan was likely Stent's entry, published in the journal Spirit of Missions in December 1889. Stent's design was narrower than what was ultimately built, but the general design was almost the same. The Society sought to raise $200,000 for the building's construction through subscription. Over half of the total amount, $110,000, was raised by March 1890. The subscription was completed with two $50,000 donations from the Edson family that May.

The Board decided to approve the project in October 1891. Early the following year, the Society bought an adjacent lot from the ASPCA, directly at the corner of Fourth Avenue and 22nd Street. Afterward, Stent's plans were revised, allowing for the construction of a larger structure on the site. The cornerstone of the building was laid on October 3, 1892, a year after the project was approved. The firm of Robinson & Wallace did not start constructing the building until that December. By mid-1893, the cost of construction had risen to $500,000. The Domestic and Foreign Missionary Society unceremoniously moved to its new headquarters on January 1, 1894. The Society did not wish to dedicate Church Missions House until all debts were settled. The building was officially dedicated three weeks later, on January 25.

=== Episcopal use ===
The building originally had an Episcopal Church bookstore on the ground floor. Office space was rented to the American Church Missionary Society, the American Church Building Fund, the Society for Promoting Christianity among the Jews, the Church Temperance Society, the Church Periodical Club, and the Brotherhood of Saint Andrew. Church Missions House started hosting the annual House of Bishops upon its completion. Church Missions House also hosted meetings of the city's Episcopal clergy, as well as elections of bishops. In 1898, a memorial altar was dedicated in Church Missions House's chapel in memory of W. S. Langford, who had long been a secretary for the Board of Missions. Four years later, Dean Hoffman willed $50,000 to the Board of Missions for real-estate investment. The money reportedly could have paid for an additional three or four stories, but these were not built.

The Domestic and Foreign Missionary Society celebrated its centennial at Church Missions House in 1921. The Episcopal Church's National Council was headquartered in the building by 1925. That year, it was tasked with studying the feasibility of relocating the Episcopal offices from Church Missions House to Washington, D.C., the capital of the United States. It was around this time that the Episcopal Church nationally faced a deficit. In 1926, the council authorized the church's finance department to sell Church Missions House. The building was valued at $400,000, though it was not sold at the time. The church continued to experience financial difficulties through the 1930s. The National Council first invited women to its meetings at Church Missions House in 1935 after a ban on female council members was rescinded. Episcopalians across the United States nicknamed Church Missions House "281", for its address number, whenever they talked about the Episcopal headquarters in the building.

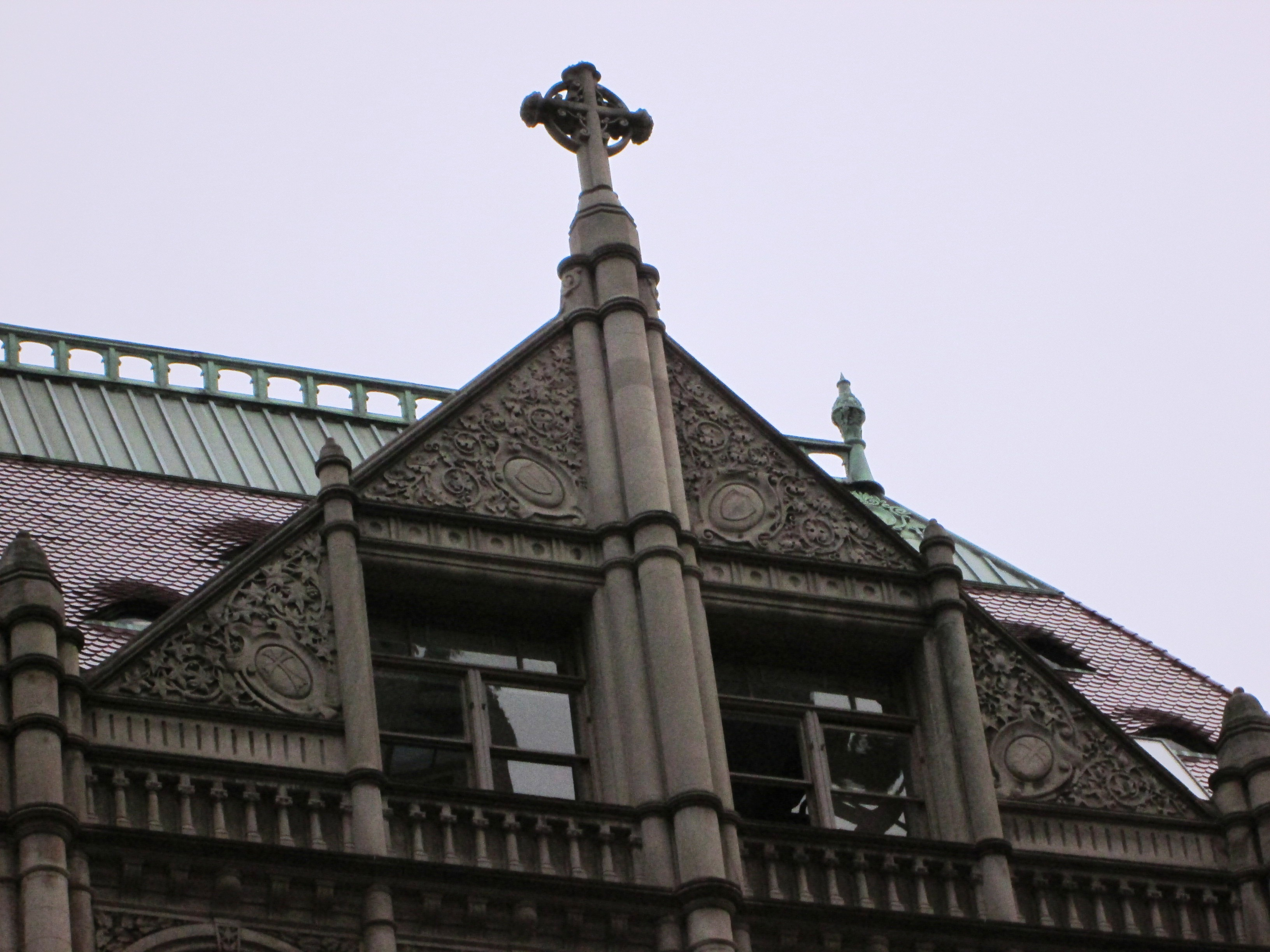
Gable at the top of Church Missions House

Relocation of the offices to D.C. was again proposed in October 1940. James E. Freeman, bishop of D.C., said at the time that he had been advocating for such a change since 1925. The Episcopal Church remained at Church Missions House. In 1947, it purchased the Herbert L. Satterlee estate in Greenwich, Connecticut, for a lodging center and presiding bishop's residence, though the Episcopal offices continued to be in Church Missions House. The presiding bishops of the Episcopal Church (including Arthur C. Lichtenberger from 1958) had their offices at Church Missions House and lived at the bishop's residence in Greenwich. Ultimately, in 1960, the Episcopal Church bought property on Second Avenue and 43rd Street. The church planned a new office building on that site to combine its offices at Church Missions House, the Greenwich estate, and a third structure at 317 East 23rd Street. By then, the church had long outgrown Church Missions House, and it had rejected several alternative office sites, including the then-new Interchurch Center in Morningside Heights, Manhattan.

=== FPWA use ===
In February 1963, the Episcopal Church moved to its new offices at 815 Second Avenue. The same year, the Federation of Protestant Welfare Agencies (FPWA) bought the building for $350,000 and spent another $560,000 to renovate it. George C. Textor, the president of the Marine Midland Trust Company, held a fundraising drive to cover the cost of purchase and renovation. As part of the project, the exterior was cleaned, the original interior details were restored, and the building was upgraded with modern elevators and mechanical systems. Church Missions House reopened in December 1963 as the FPWA's first permanent headquarters; the organization had previously occupied rented space. At that time, the Municipal Art Society and The New York Community Trust had already designated the building as a landmark.

The New York City Landmarks Preservation Commission designated Church Missions House as a city landmark on September 11, 1979. The building was added to the National Register of Historic Places on June 3, 1982. Church Missions House lies immediately outside the Gramercy Park Historic District, though a neighborhood group has proposed adding the building to the district. While the district was extended in 1988, the building was not part of the extension.

Church Missions House was restored in the early 1990s by the firm of Kapell & Kastow. The FPWA received a $300,000 grant to restore the roof in June 1991. The roof, the stained-glass windows, and the wooden doors and wainscoting were renovated as part of the project. In addition, the mosaic-tile floors and plaster decorations were restored. The architects created rental space for other non-profit organizations on two floors and the Laura Parsons Pratt Conference Center on the ground floor. J.P. Morgan & Co. provided a letter of credit to the FPWA for the restoration. The New York Landmarks Conservancy granted its Lucy G. Moses Preservation Award in 1994 to Kapell & Kostow for their renovation of Church Missions House.

=== 2010s to present ===
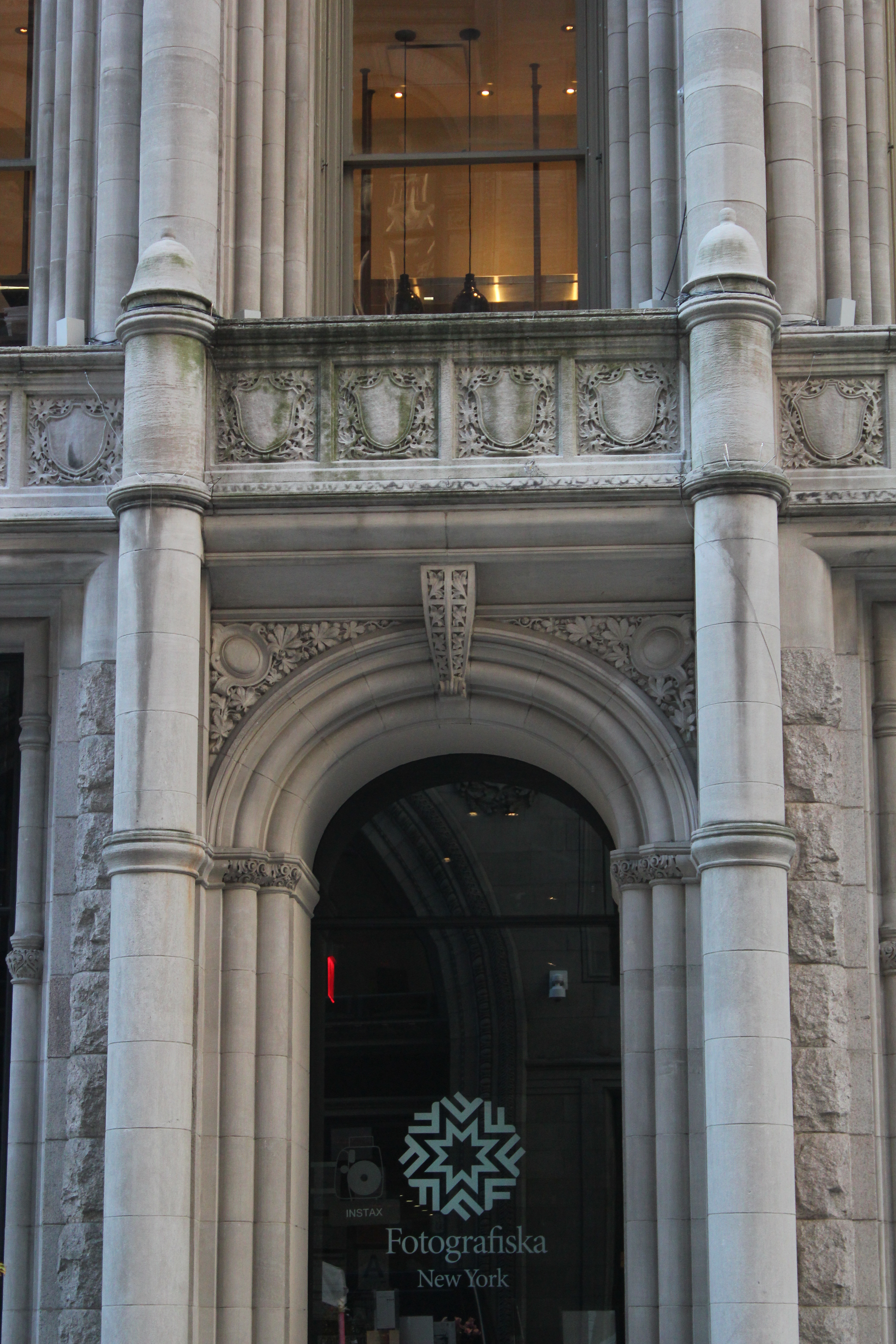
Secondary entrance to Fotografiska New York from 22nd Street

By 2014, Church Missions House was for sale; at the time, it was the only remaining building in Charity Row that was still used by a nonprofit. The building was sold that July for approximately $50 million. The Real Deal magazine initially reported that the Garzoni family of Italy was the buyer, but it subsequently reported that Aby Rosen of RFR Realty was the true buyer. Rosen was acquiring several other structures across Manhattan at the time, saying that his firm was seeking "properties that are unique, with beautiful architecture". With the sale, the FPWA decided to move to the Financial District of Lower Manhattan. The joint venture of RFR Holding and HQ Capital Real Estate LP finalized their purchase in January 2015. The building was to be converted to condominiums, with shops on the ground floor and an office lobby on 22nd Street. The LPC approved the plans in March 2015.

The building's varying ceiling heights and relatively small floor plates also made the building unwieldy for office use. By August 2015, RFR was looking to lease the building to a single tenant instead of converting it to office use. The same year, Jan Broman, cofounder of Swedish photography museum Fotografiska, decided to lease the building after his wife had pointed it out during a taxicab ride. Broman was looking to expand the museum to New York City, and he contacted the building's leasing agent the day after his taxicab ride. Another contender for the building during this time was Anna Sorokin, who was looking to lease Church Missions House for the Anna Delvey Foundation, a private members' club and art foundation that she hoped to create. Sorokin was subsequently indicted for fraud in 2018, having pretended to be a wealthy heiress. Several statues of naked men were displayed in the building's storefronts in 2016.

In 2017, Fotografiska leased the entire building from RFR. The transaction included an adjacent chapel, which would be connected to a restaurant in the building. CetraRuddy was hired to redesign the interior for the museum, while Roman and Williams was hired to design a second-story restaurant space with a bar. In addition, Higgins Quasebarth & Partners restored the building's historic design features and technology company Linq designed equipment for the museum. Fotografiska New York opened in December 2019. The same month, RFR bought out its partner's stake in the building for $56 million. The building's popularity increased in the early 2020s after Netflix released Inventing Anna, a drama miniseries about Sorokin. RFR placed Church Missions House for sale in July 2022, seeking $135 million for the building; however, a change in the building's ownership would not affect Fotografiska's lease.

In May 2024, Fotografiska announced it would relocate that September and that the restaurant and Chapel Bar would close in June 2024. That month, RFR placed the building for sale once again, with an asking price of $125 million.

== See also ==
- National Register of Historic Places listings in Manhattan from 14th to 59th Streets
- List of New York City Designated Landmarks in Manhattan from 14th to 59th Streets
