= Marquis Miami =

Skyscraper in Miami, Florida, United States

Marquis
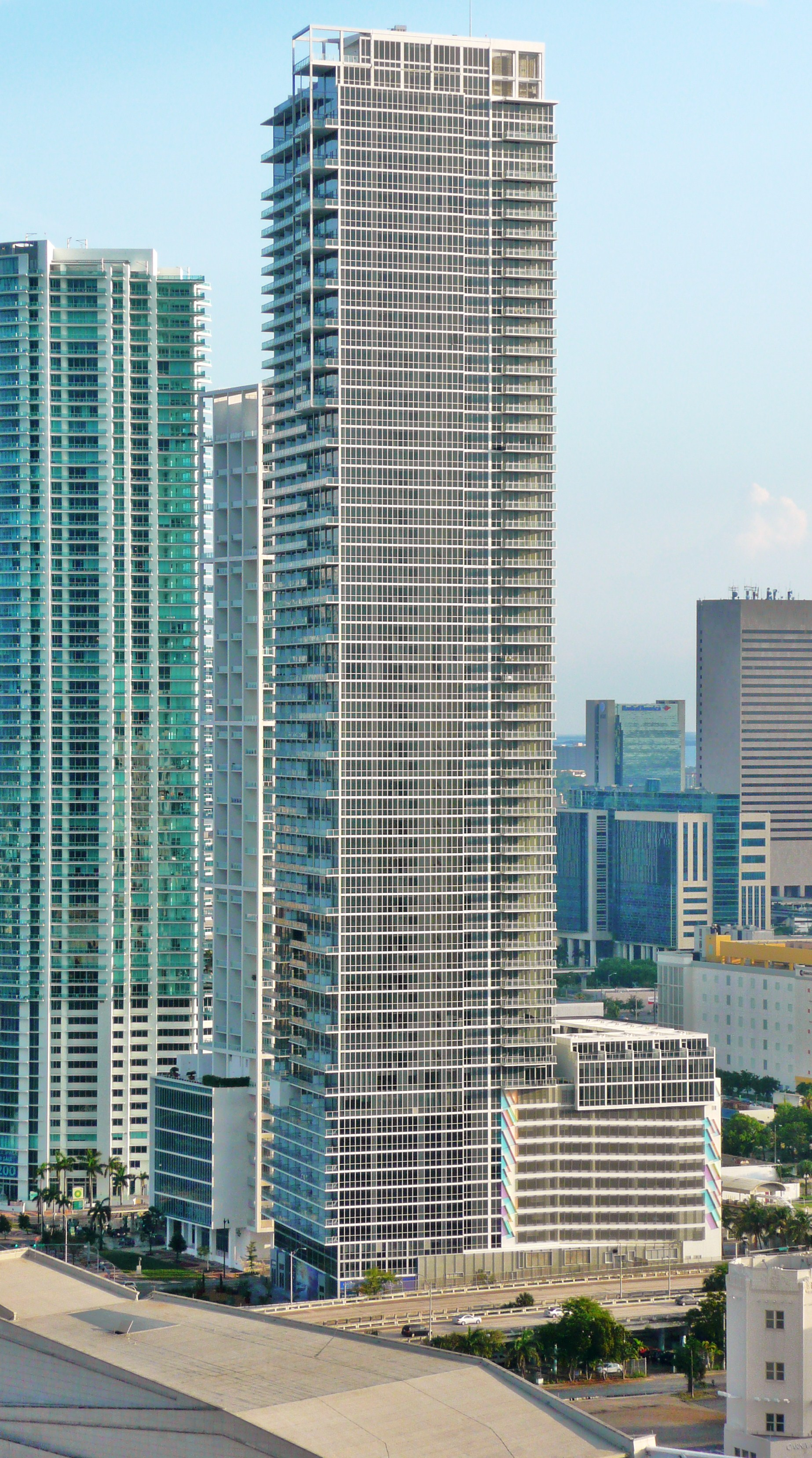
- Marquis in May 2010
- Interactive map of the Marquis area

General information
- Status: Completed
- Type: Residential & Hotel
- Location: 1100 Biscayne Boulevard; Miami, FL 33132; United States
- Coordinates: 25.785235°N 80.190062°W
- Construction started: 2005
- Completed: 2009

Height
- Roof: 702 ft (214 m)

Technical details
- Floor count: 67

Design and construction
- Architect: Arquitectonica
- Structural engineer: DeSimone Consulting Engineers

Marquis is a skyscraper in Miami, Florida, United States. It is located in northeastern Downtown, on Biscayne Bay along the west side of Biscayne Boulevard. It was topped out in March 2008. The tower is 702 feet (214 metres) tall and contains 67 floors.

The building currently stands as the 5th tallest building in Miami and the state of Florida, behind the Panorama Tower, the Four Seasons Hotel Miami, the Southeast Financial Center, and One Thousand Museum. The building is located across from Museum Park in northern downtown on Biscayne Boulevard between Northeast 11th Street and 12th Street, adjacent to the Eleventh Street Metromover Station.

Levels 1–3 are used by retail & the hotel. Floors 5–14 are used for parking, hotel units and amenities, and floors 15–64 contain residential units. Floors 65-67 contain the upper levels of the penthouses on the 64th level. Many of these penthouses are three or four levels.

The building has a pool, a spa, and a gym.

== Gallery ==
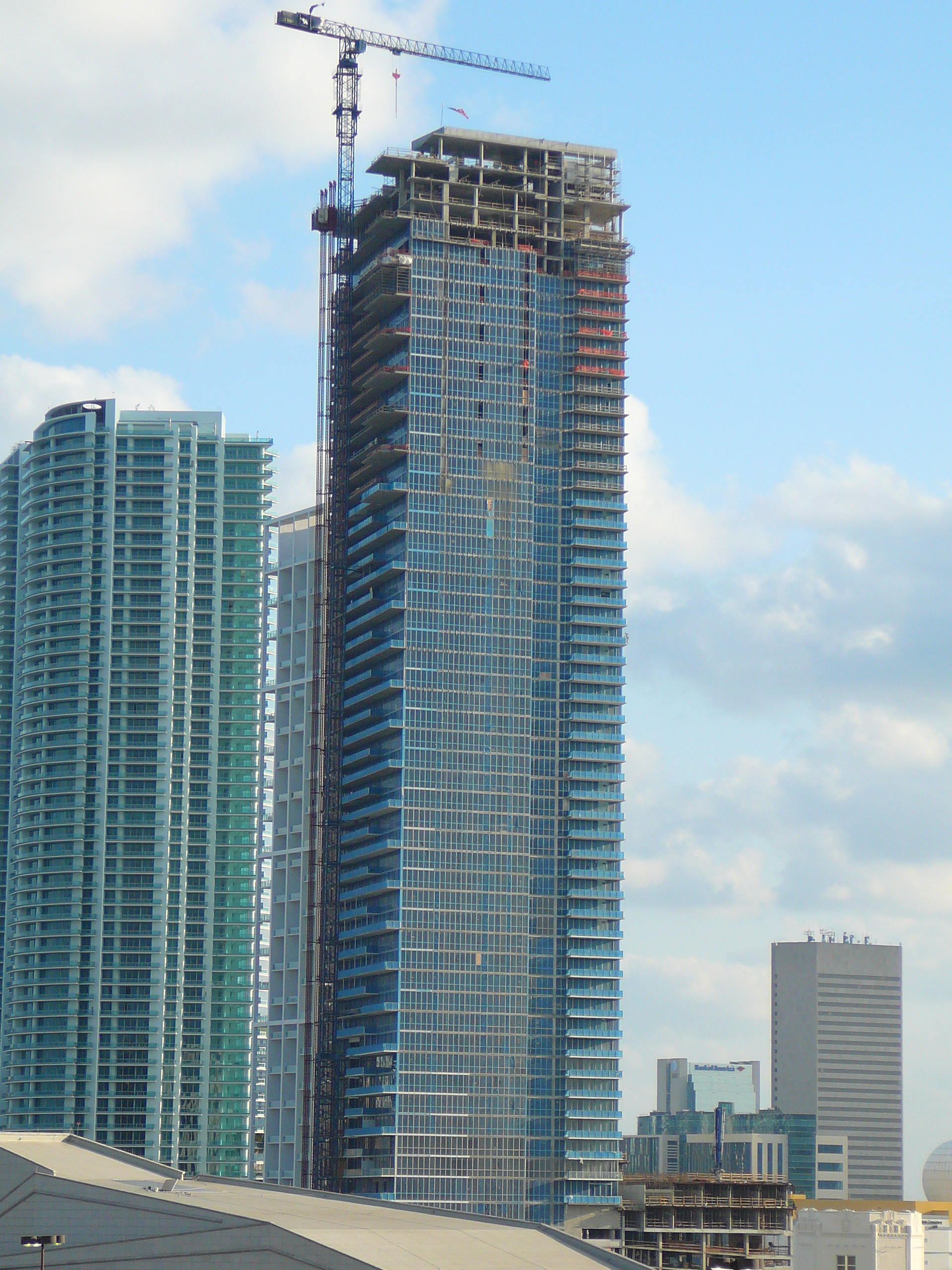
A topped-off Marquis as seen in May 2008

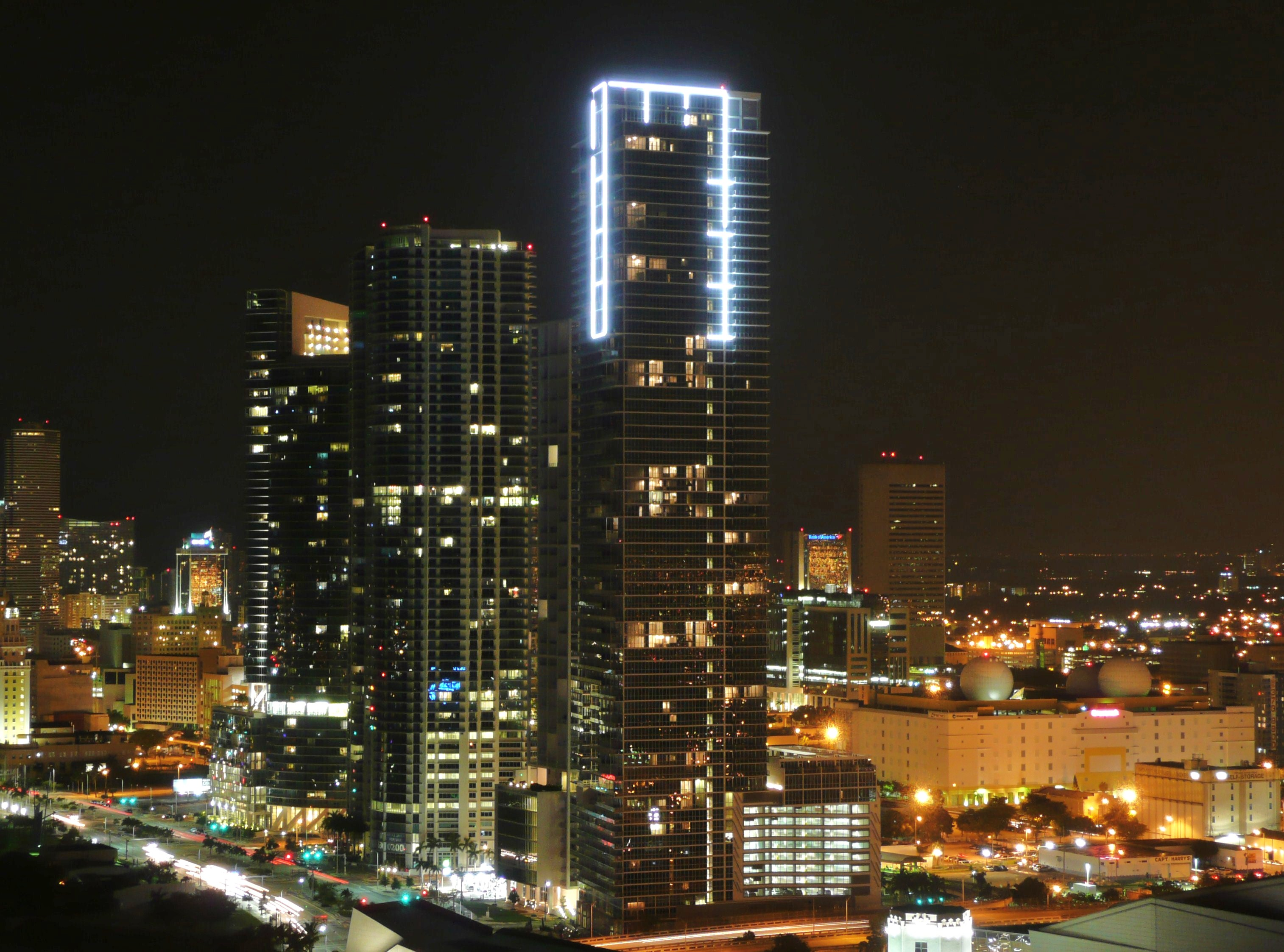
Tower at night

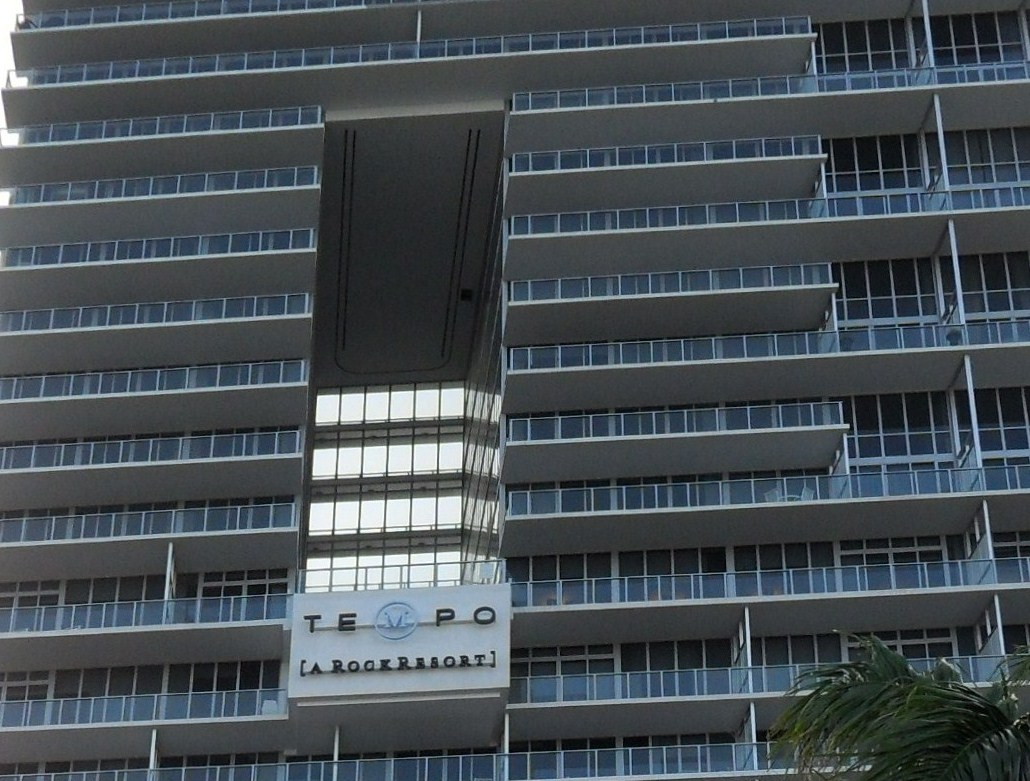
Tempo [A Rock Resort] building cut out

== See also ==
- List of tallest buildings in Miami
- Downtown Miami
- List of tallest buildings in Florida
