= 1401 Brickell by Santander =

General information
- Status: Under construction
- Type: Office
- Location: 1401 Brickell Avenue, Miami, Florida, United States
- Groundbreaking: April 9, 2026
- Estimated completion: 2029
- Client: Banco Santander

Height
- Roof: 765 ft (233 m) proposed height

Technical details
- Floor count: 50

Design and construction
- Architect: Handel Architects
- Structural engineer: DeSimone Consulting Engineers

Website
- 1401brickellmiami.com

1401 Brickell by Santander is a skyscraper currently under construction in Miami, Florida. It will accommodate international offices for Banco Santander. The rest of the building would be leased for office/business space.

Construction broke ground on the building in April 2026 and is estimated for completion in 2029. The previous 14-story Santander Private Banking tower built in the 1970s was demolished in 2025.

== See also ==
- List of tallest buildings in Miami
