= Le Jardinier =

Restaurant in New York City, U.S.

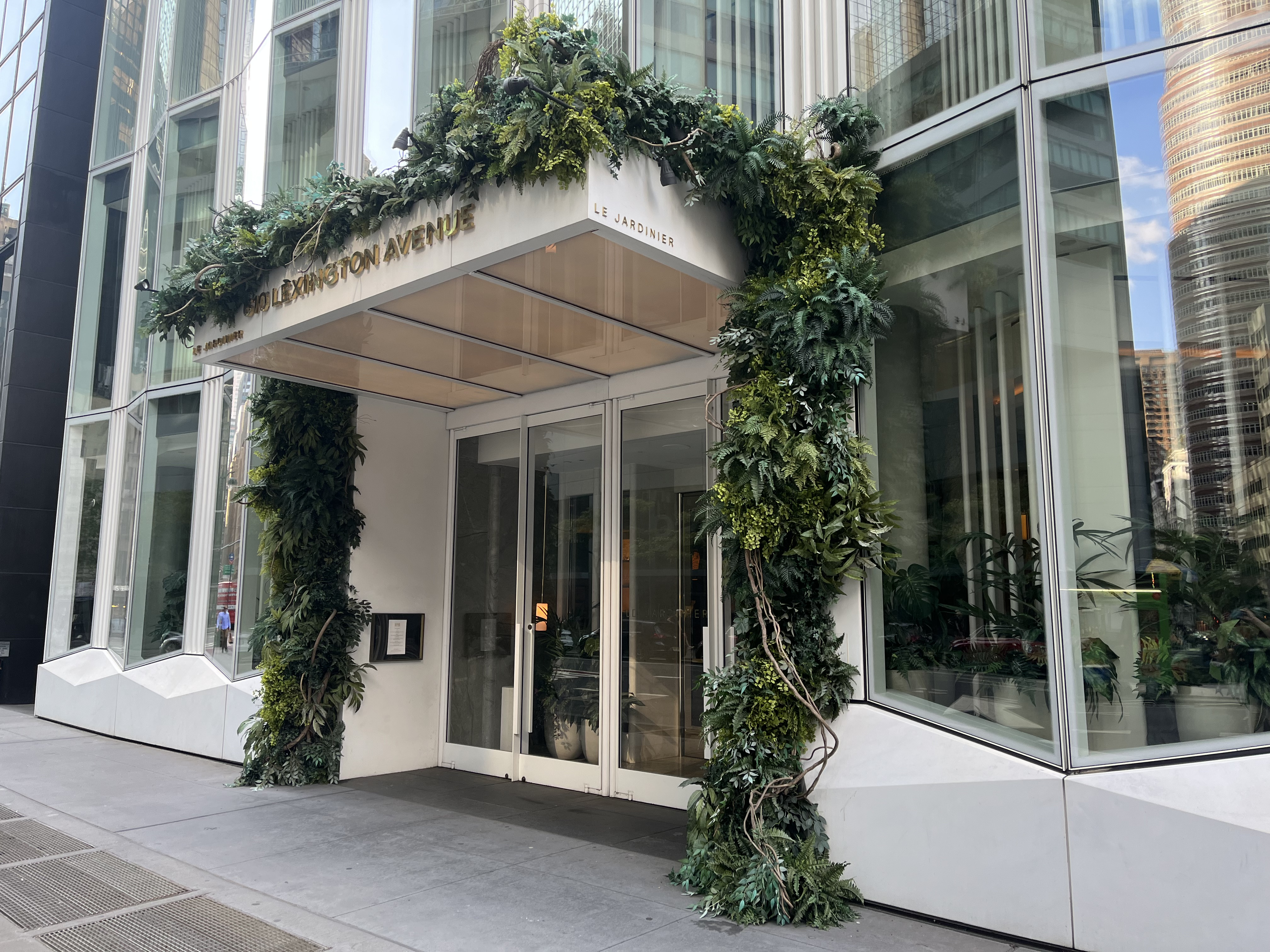
- Restaurant Exterior (2023)
- Interactive map of Le Jardinier

Restaurant information
- Established: 2019
- Head chef: Alain Verzeroli
- Food type: French Nouvelle
- Rating: Miami (Michelin Guide); Texas (Michelin Guide)
- Location: 610 Lexington Avenue, New York City, New York, 10022, United States
- Coordinates: 40°45′30″N 73°58′17″W
- Website: https://lejardinier-nyc.com

Le Jardinier is a French nouvelle cuisine restaurant in Midtown Manhattan, New York City. The restaurant is currently based in the first floor of the SELENE skyscraper, and is one of multiple award-winning restaurants in the Bastion Collection portfolio. There are other locations in Miami and Houston.

== History ==
Le Jardinier first opened its doors in May 2019, with Andrew Ayala as the Chef de Cuisine and Alain Verzeroli as the Culinary Director. Prior to joining Le Jardinier, Verzeroli was Culinary Director at the three-Michelin-starred Le Chateau de Joël Robuchon in Ebisu, Tokyo. The restaurant has received a Michelin star the same year that it opened, and has retained the award until 2023. 2023 saw the opening of the Bastion Bar, which also serves a selection of small plates. Both the restaurant and the bar are known for their seasonal menus. This served as a replacement for Shun, a Japanese French fusion restaurant which closed in 2020 as a result of the COVID-19 pandemic.

Since the opening of Le Jardinier New York, two more outposts of the restaurants have been opened. The first is in Miami (opened August 2019), and earned its first Michelin star in 2022 - the first year that the Michelin Guide sent inspectors to the city. The second is in Houston (opened May 2021), based in the Nancy and Rich Kinder Building - itself a part of the Houston Museum of Fine Arts, and earned its first Michelin star in 2024 - also the first year that the Michelin Guide sent inspectors to the State of Texas.

== Awards ==
Awards for the restaurant include:

- One star in the New York City Michelin Guide from 2019–2023
- One star in the Florida Michelin Guide from 2022–2024
- One star in the inaugural Texas Michelin Guide for 2024

== See also ==
- List of Michelin-starred restaurants in Florida
- List of Michelin-starred restaurants in New York City
- List of Michelin-starred restaurants in Texas
- List of restaurants in Houston
- List of restaurants in Miami
- List of restaurants in New York City
