= IAC Video Wall =

'I Date' module

The IAC Video Wall, located in the Frank Gehry-designed headquarters for IAC in Chelsea, Manhattan, New York City, is one of the largest high-resolution video walls in the world, 120 feet (37 m) wide and 11 feet (3.4 m) high. The installation features the world’s largest high-resolution video wall, built by Prysm, using their proprietary Laser Phosphor Display (LPD) technology, a new display technology that uses low-power, solid–state lasers. The two walls will deliver more than 50 million pixels combined. The large-scale projection wall is visible from the West Side Highway/11th Avenue to tens of thousands of commuters each day, building brand awareness for IAC's online businesses.

Brand-specific modules designed and conceived by Trollback + Company represent the essence of each brand, incorporating a range of 2D, 3D and live action elements. The modules are based on a theme reflecting the consumer experience associated with IAC’s online businesses, such as ‘I Date’, ‘I Travel” and ‘I Shop’, a concept conceived by Bruce Mau of Bruce Mau Design. The ‘I Date’ module uses the main romantic icon, flowers, and creates a sensual sequence with dramatic details of the time-lapse flowers opening. The simple concept for ‘I Shop’ was to illustrate the enormous quantity and diversity of products available from IAC’s retail websites, using the scale of the display to create an immense sense of depth and infinite choice of merchandise.

Two of the modules incorporate dynamic data from the web. ‘I Experience’ parses a daily xml feed that is programmed to visualize the movement of current music events across the USA, linking locations and forming connections between venues. ‘I Explore’ creates an endless loop of current news.

Emphasizing the public nature of the wall, creative director Jason Koxvold conceived two time-keeping modules that use innovative graphics to represent the progression. In one, graphic bars animate across the whole length of the wall, rendering a strong physicality of the passing of time. For the other clock, type is moving across the wall, spelling out date and time, as well as using relative positions to give an animated experience of time.

In fall of 2007, a class was offered at NYU's Interactive Telecommunications Program called "Big Screens", which culminated in a presentation of student works that were designed specifically for the IAC Video Wall. The projects were programmed using Processing (Java) and openFrameworks (C++) and powered by an open source multi-screen synchronization server called Most Pixels Ever, originally designed by Daniel Shiffman and Chris Kairalla. The class is now an annual event, occurring each December.
