= IAC Building =

Office building in Manhattan, New York

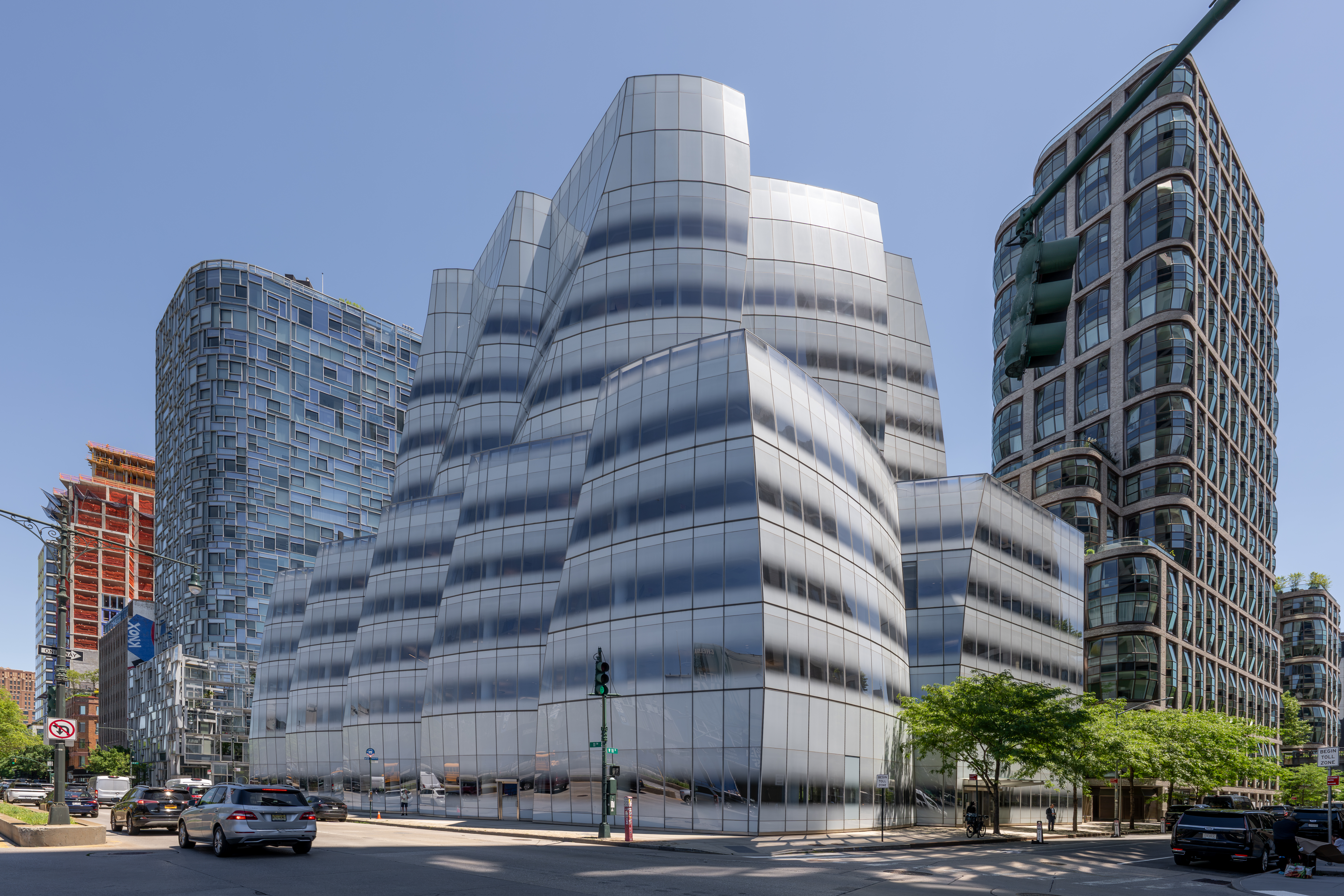
- (2026)

General information
- Status: Completed
- Type: Office building
- Location: 555 West 18th Street; Manhattan, New York City
- Coordinates: 40°44′44″N 74°00′28″W
- Construction started: 2005
- Completed: 2007
- Owner: IAC

Height
- Height: 145 feet (44 m)

Technical details
- Floor count: 10
- Lifts/elevators: 4

Design and construction
- Architects: Frank Gehry, Adamson Associates (as architect of record)
- Developer: Georgetown Company
- Structural engineer: DeSimone Consulting Engineers; Cosentini Associates
- Main contractor: Turner Construction

The IAC Building is the headquarters of the media company IAC at 555 West 18th Street on the northeast corner of Eleventh Avenue in the Chelsea neighborhood of Manhattan, New York City. Designed by Frank Gehry and completed in 2007, it was Gehry's first full-building design in New York City and featured the world's largest high definition screen at the time in its lobby.

Reminiscent of several other Gehry designs, the building appears to consist of two major levels: a large base of twisted tower-sections packed together like the cells of a bee hive, with a second bundle of lesser diameter sitting on top of the first. The cell units have the appearance of sails skinned over the skeleton of the building. The full-height windows fade from clear to white on the top and bottom edges of each story. The overall impression is of two very tall stories, which belies its actual 10-story structure. Vanity Fair commented that the building is perhaps one of the world's most attractive office buildings. Barry Diller, the head of IAC who was intimately involved with the project, mandated that the facade be covered in smooth glass rather than wrinkling titanium, as Gehry had originally planned. Diller said he chose Gehry to design the building because he wanted a space where workers "could collaborate and be in an open atmosphere" which he did not think could be done as easily in a typical boxy building.

IAC purchased the land under the building in 2023 for $80 million.

== In popular culture ==
The IAC Building is featured in the movies The Other Guys and Wall Street: Money Never Sleeps. It was featured in multiple CollegeHumor sketches, as the building served as the company's New York office.

== Gallery ==
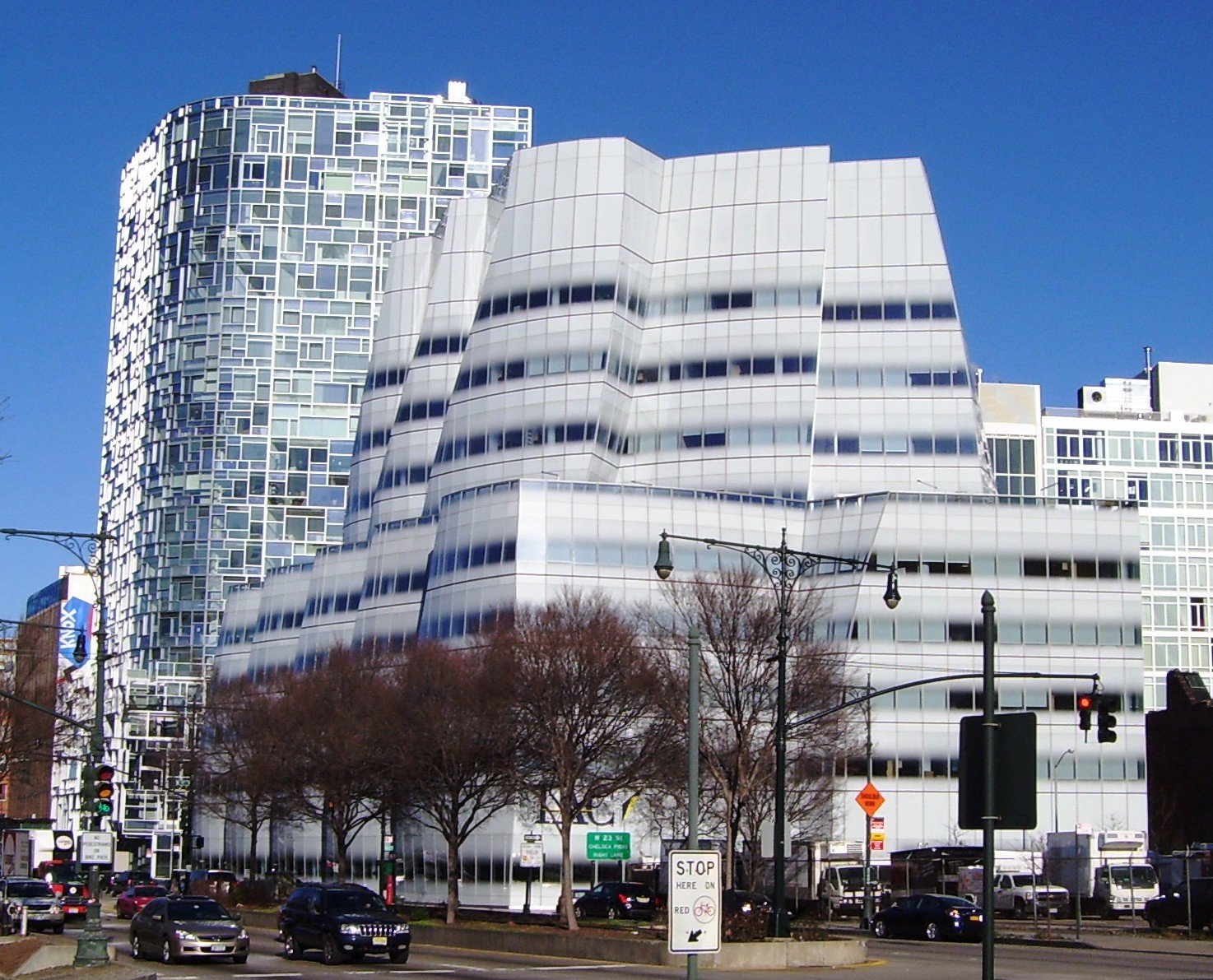
with Jean Nouvel's 100 Eleventh Avenue (behind and to the left) in 2010

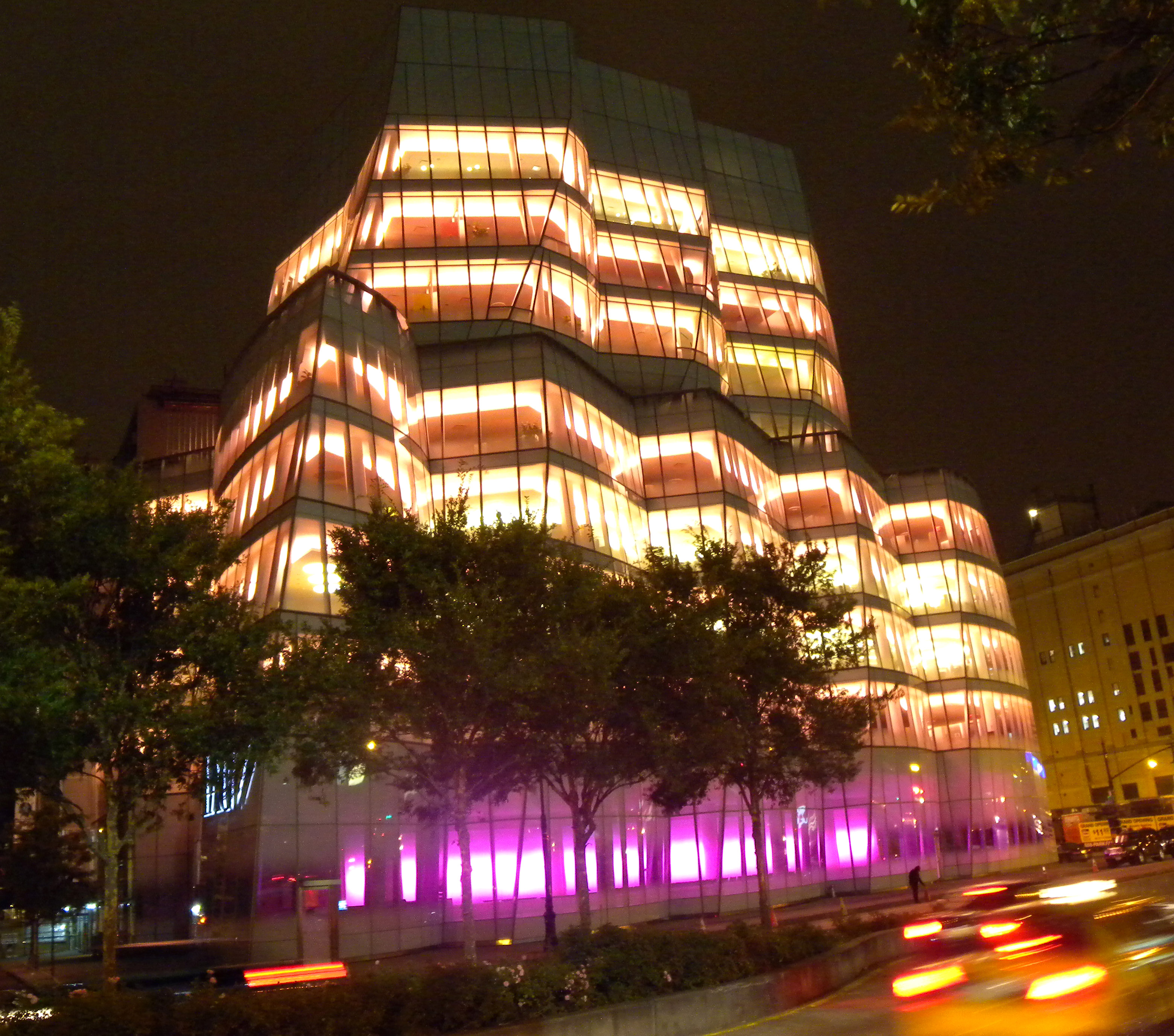
lit up at night

== See also ==
- IAC Video Wall
- List of works by Frank Gehry
