= Federation of Protestant Welfare Agencies =

Social services organization in New York City

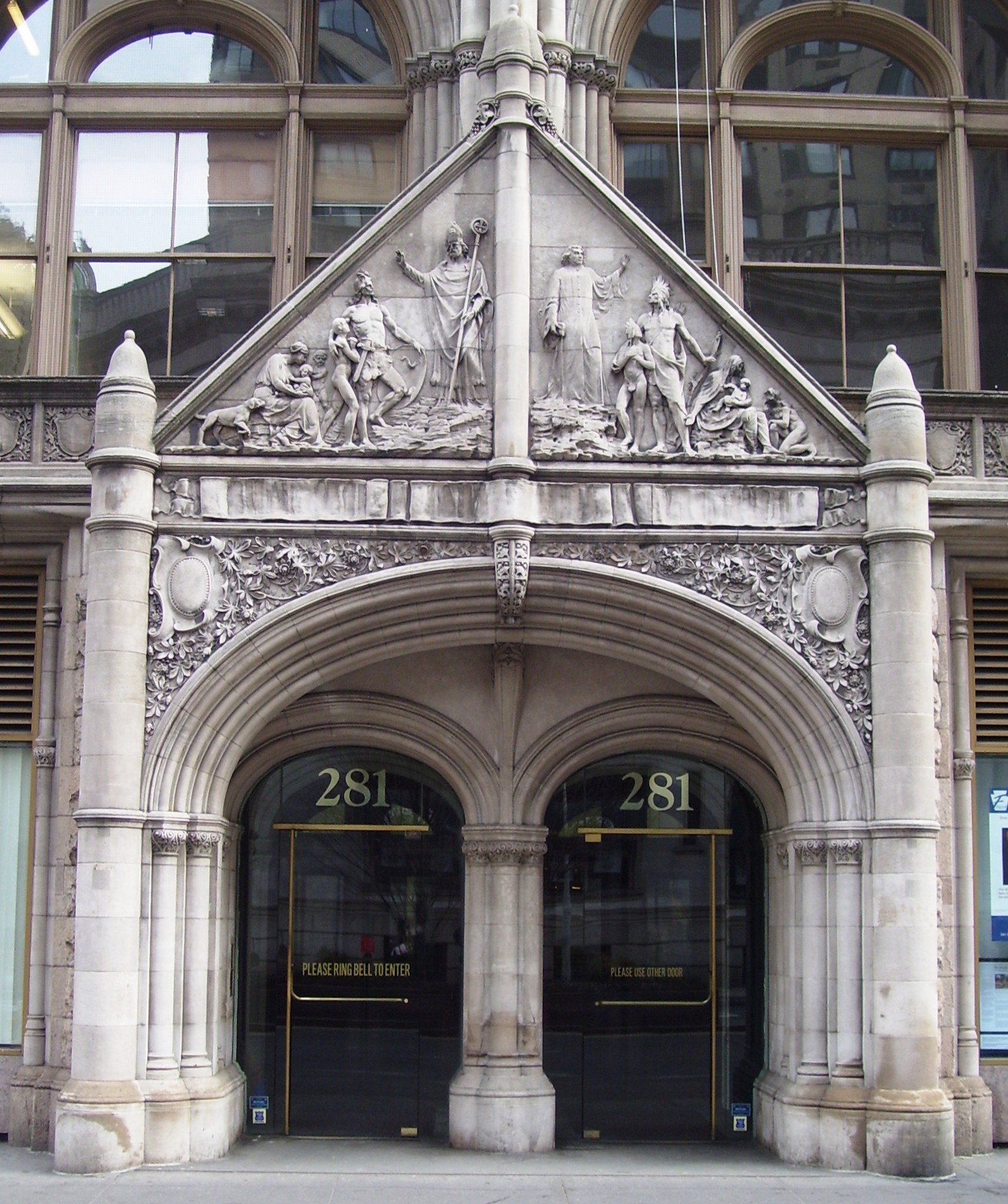
The entrance to Church Missions House, the former home of FPWA

The Federation of Protestant Welfare Agencies (FPWA) is a social services institution in United States of America. Since its inception in 1922, FPWA has sought to promote the social and economic well-being of greater New York's most vulnerable Protestants by strengthening human service organizations and advocating for just public policies. Its first permanent home was the Church Missions House, a historic landmark located at 281 Park Avenue. In May 2015, FPWA moved its office and conference center to 40 Broad Street where it occupies the 5th Floor of the mixed use building.

== History ==
FPWA was originally named the Federation of Institutions Caring for Protestant Children. It was founded in response to a request in 1920 from the Commissioner of the New York City Department of Public Welfare, seeking representatives of religious social welfare organizations to form an advisory committee across the country. In the 1930s the organization changed its name to the Federation of Protestant Welfare Agencies, seeking to increase access to needed services and expand its programs and services. FPWA bought the Church Missions House in 1963. In 2015, the organization underwent a re-branding and officially goes by the acronym, FPWA.

FPWA exists today with a membership of almost 200 social service agencies and churches all over the country. Its policy efforts focus on issues of income security, child welfare, childcare and education, elderly welfare, workforce development, youth services, HIV and AIDS, and offers scholarship programs and emergency financial assistance. In addition, in 2007 it was among over 530 New York City arts and social service institutions to receive part of a $30 million grant from the Carnegie Corporation, which was made possible through a donation by New York City mayor Michael Bloomberg.

The current CEO is a child and family advocate, Jennifer Jones Austin.
