= Selene (building) =

Residential skyscraper in Manhattan, New York

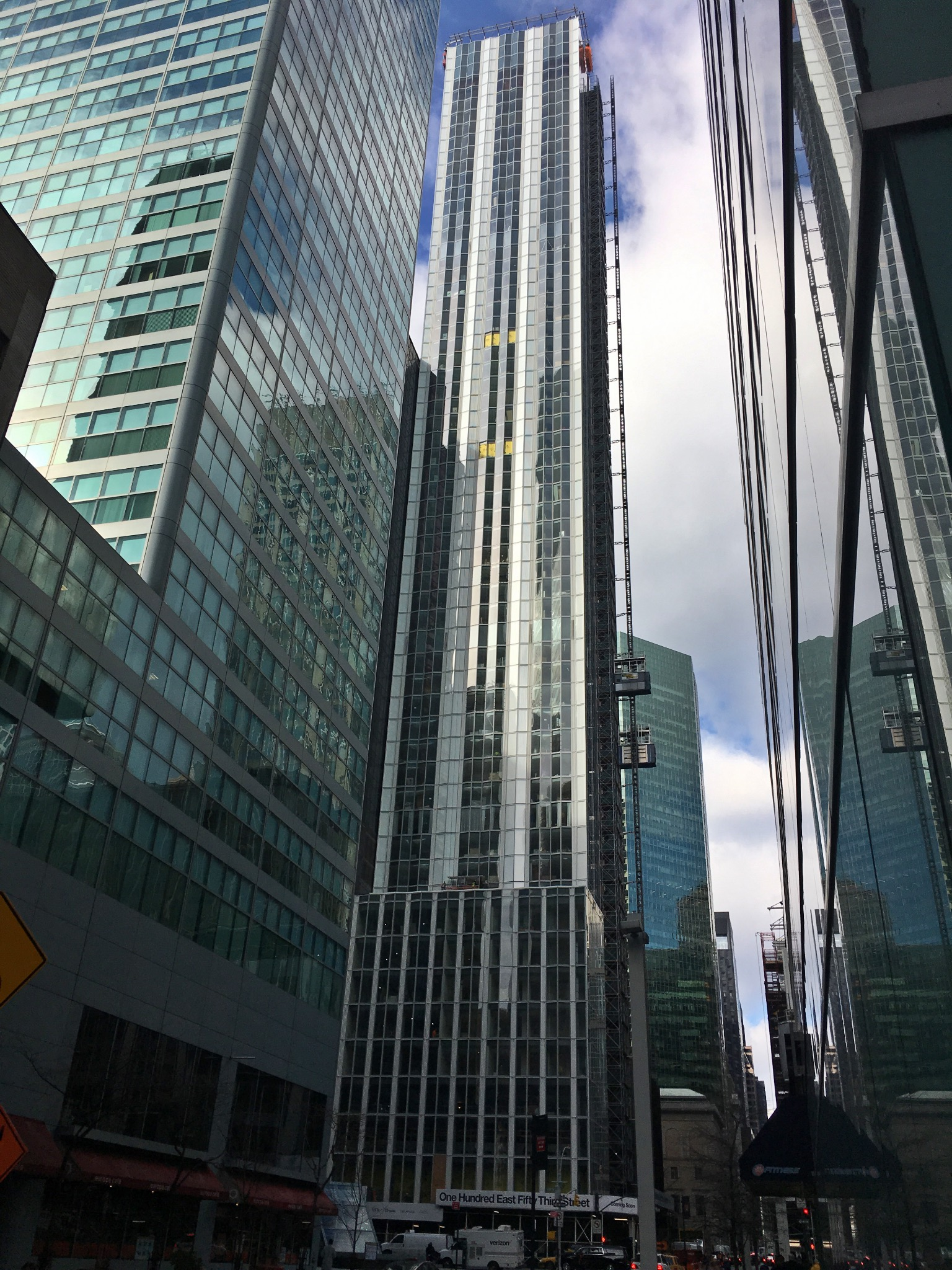
- Interactive map of the Selene area

General information
- Status: Complete
- Type: Residential
- Coordinates: 40°45′30″N 73°58′17″W
- Construction started: 2008
- Completed: 2019

Height
- Architectural: 711 ft (217 m)
- Antenna spire: 711 ft (217 m)

Technical details
- Floor count: 63
- Floor area: 23,880 m^{2} (257,000 sq ft)

Design and construction
- Architect: Foster and Partners
- Developer: Aby Rosen & Michael Fuchs
- Structural engineer: DeSimone Consulting Engineers
- Main contractor: Pavarini McGovern Construction

Website
- http://100e53.com/

Selene (formerly known as 100 East 53rd Street and 610 Lexington Avenue) is a residential skyscraper at the southwest corner of 53rd Street and Lexington Avenue in Midtown Manhattan, New York City. The 64-story tower, completed in 2019, was designed by Norman Foster. At 711 feet (217 m) tall, it is the 77th tallest building in New York.

== History ==
It was supposed to feature a Shangri-La Hotel and condos but as a result of the 2008 financial crisis and the downturn in the residential real estate market, the building's construction was put on indefinite hold in 2009 and the hotel idea was later abandoned.

In March 2012, Aby Rosen and Michael Fuchs of RFR Holding regained control of the site and announced their intentions to carry on with the project. Excavation work began in early 2014. The building was completely leased within that same year. The building topped out on January 13, 2016. It was set to be complete by spring 2017, according to a 2015 update. As of October 2017, the construction was still ongoing. The building was still not completed in early 2019, though construction was completed by the middle of that year. In February 2022, the building was rebranded as Selene.

== Amenities ==
The building features 94 condominium units, most of which contain one to three bedrooms, though there are two four-bedroom duplexes. The third and fourth floors have amenities for residents including a 60-by-15 foot lap pool, a sauna and steam rooms, a fitness center, and yoga and ballet rooms. The building also has a 24-hour doorman, keyed elevator access, and a library and resident lounge. In 2016, French chef Joël Robuchon signed a lease for two floors of the building, with an upscale restaurant on the second floor and a more casual restaurant on street level.

In May 2019, The Bastion Collection and chef Alain Verzeroli opened Le Jardinier, a contemporary French restaurant, on the first floor. The next month, they opened Shun, a Japanese-French restaurant one floor above Le Jardinier. The second floor also has a bar and two private dining spaces. Le Jardinier received a Michelin Star in 2020 and 2021.

== See also ==
- List of tallest buildings in New York City
