= 121 East 22nd =

Building in Manhattan, New York

122 East 23rd Street
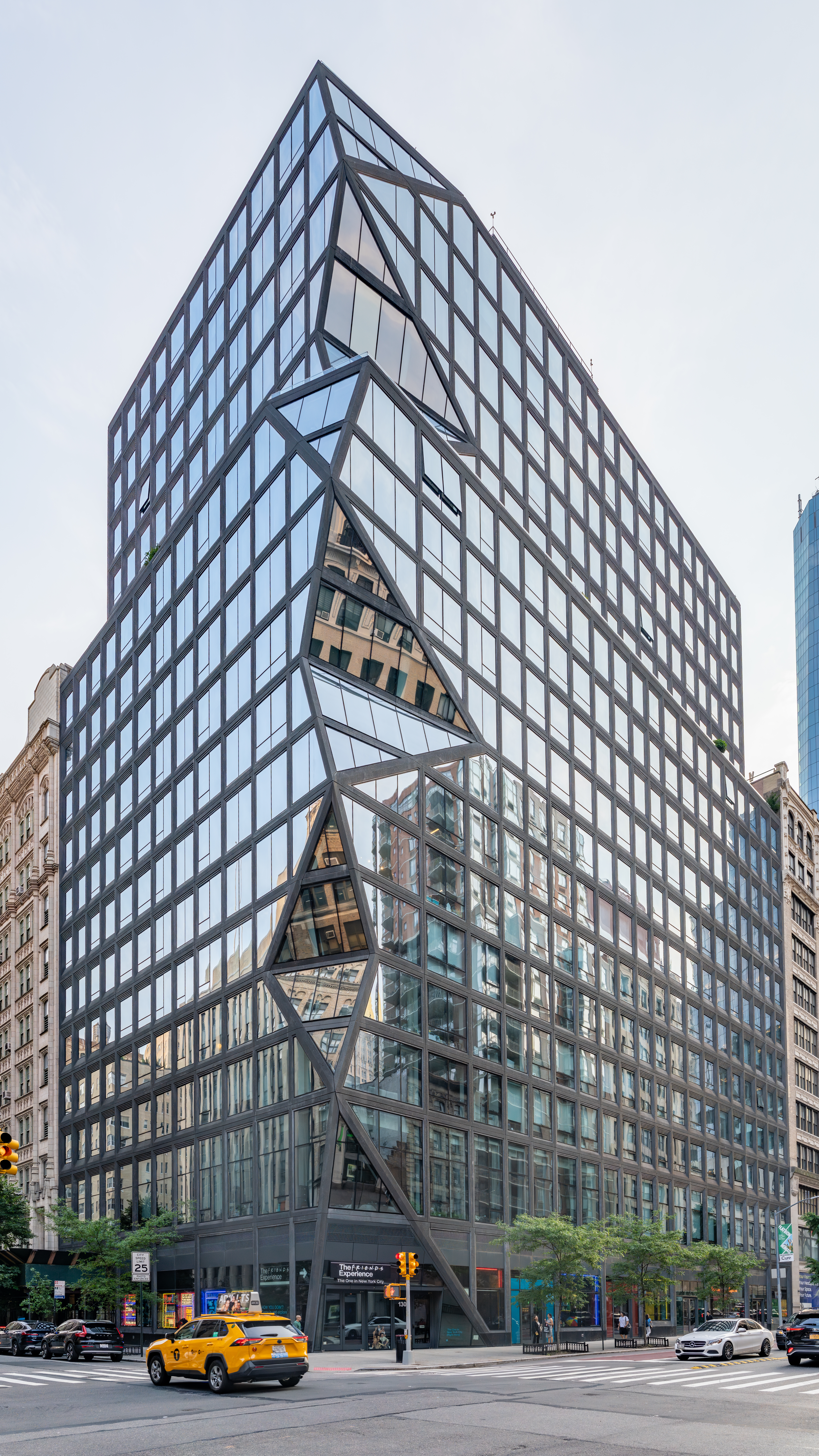
- (2025)
- Interactive map of the 122 East 23rd Street area

General information
- Type: Mixed-use
- Coordinates: 40.739350°N 73.985493°W

Technical details
- Floor count: 18
- Floor area: 275,387 square feet (25,584.3 m^{2})

Design and construction
- Architect: Rem Koolhaas

121 East 22nd (also 122 East 23rd Street) is a building in the Gramercy Park neighborhood of Manhattan in New York City. Developed by American company Toll Brothers, it is the first building in New York City designed by Rem Koolhaas's architectural firm OMA.

== History and development ==
The headquarters of United Cerebral Palsy previously occupied the site at the southwest corner of Lexington Avenue and 23rd Street. Avison Young acted as broker for the sale of the site. Some of the $135 million profit was donated to the New York City Foundation for Cerebral Palsy. The building is one of several new developments on 23rd Street, including the Madison Square Park Tower.

SLCE is the architect of record.

== Amenities ==
The building includes a central courtyard, a pool, and a robotic parking system.
