= DeSimone Consulting Engineers =

American structural engineering firm

DeSimone Consulting Engineering
- Formerly: DeSimone + Chaplin & Associates (1969-1986); DeSimone, Chaplin, Dobryn & Associates (1986-1998)
- Industry: Structural engineering
- Founded: 1969; 57 years ago
- Founder: Vincent J. DeSimone
- Headquarters: New York City
- Area served: Boston; Chicago; Dallas-Fort Worth; Foxborough; Houston; Las Vegas; Miami; New Haven; New York City; San Francisco; London; Medellín; Abu Dhabi; Dubai
- Owner: Stephen V. DeSimone
- Website: www.desimone.com

DeSimone Consulting Engineering is a structural engineering firm founded by Vincent J. DeSimone in 1969 in New York City. The firm provides structural engineering services to architects, owners and developers, and performs structural analysis and design for all types of buildings at all project phases. DeSimone also launched a Property Loss Consulting division in 2016. The company has offices in Boston, Chicago, Dallas-Fort Worth, Foxborough, Houston, Las Vegas, Miami, New Haven, New York City, San Francisco, London, Medellín, Abu Dhabi, and Dubai. DeSimone has designed over 10,000 projects in 40 states and 45 countries.

== History ==
=== Vincent J. DeSimone (1969 - 2002) ===
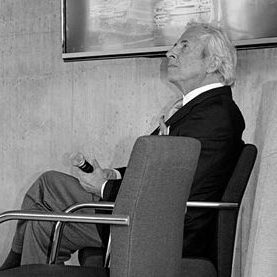
Founder, and former president and CEO Vincent DeSimone

DeSimone + Chaplin & Associates was founded in New York City in 1969 by Vincent "Vince" J. DeSimone and James "Jim" Chaplin, both graduates from Manhattan College who were working at Lev Zetlin & Associates (LZA) (now Thornton Tomasetti). By 1964 Vincent was running the day-to-day operations of LZA, while Chaplin was their best structural engineer.

In 1986 the firm was renamed to DeSimone, Chaplin, Dobryn & Associates after a third principle, Carlos M. Dobryn, was brought into the firm, a veteran at Skilling, Helle, Christiansen, and Robertson. But by 1998 the firm was rechartered as DeSimone Consulting Engineers a PLLC.

Vince stepped down as CEO in 2002, making way for his son, Stephen V. DeSimone. Vince would work as President of the firm until his passing in 2016 from a battle with cancer.

=== Stephen V. DeSimone (2002 - present) ===
In 2025 DeSimone unveiled a new logo (left), replacing their old logo (right) which they used since Stephen DeSimone became CEO in 2002.

On August 11, 2016, it was announced that DeSimone would be moving their headquarters from 18 West 18th Street to 140 Broadway, leasing the entire 25th floor. Although the amount the firm paid wasn't disclosed, it is estimated to have been ~$1,625,000. (Note: The 26th floor was also simultaneously up for rent, with an asking price of $65 per square foot, with the buildings floor-plates being 25,000 square feet.) Cushman & Wakefield facilitated the lease, stating that DeSimone moved to the new Downtown location to be closer to clients.

The firm has made a concerted effort to break into the engineering field in the United Kingdom, opening a London office in May 2022. However, struggled to gain significant clients due to the lack of the firms brand recognition in the United Kingdom. In an effort to remedy this, the firm acquired DP Squared on 1 August 2023, one of the leading British structural engineering firms in Manchester, and Northern England as a whole.

The Architect's Newspaper named DeSimone Consulting Engineering the best structural engineering firm in the Northeastern United States for 2023.

CEO Monthly named Stephen DeSimone the 2024 "Most Innovative Structural and Façade Consultancy CEO" due to his leadership style, commitment to the company's vision, and his capability to navigate the changing engineering industry landscape.

On November 17, 2025, DeSimone announced a brand "refresh" where they replaced their wordmark logo which had been in use since 2002 with a new logo designed by Michael Bierut and Pentagram over a two-year period along with a new tagline "Bridging science and humanity" lifted from a quote by Vincent DeSimone.

== Engineering ==
=== Exoskeleton buildings ===
DeSimone is recognized for its work with exoskeleton buildings, including the award-winning residential building on the Upper West Side of Manhattan at 170 Amsterdam Avenue. The 20-story residential high-rise features a concrete exoskeleton with a diagrid design and was developed using newly available modeling technology. The building's exoskeleton moves the structure to the exterior, allowing for flexible floor plans free of columns. A specialized concrete mix was used for the exterior structure which was made to look like limestone. Fiberglass was also used also used on the exterior. DeSimone was nominated and received a Diamond Award for Structural Systems from the American Council of Engineering Companies in 2016 for their work on 170 Amsterdam.

DeSimone is also the structural engineering firm for One Thousand Museum in Miami, Florida. Designed by Zaha Hadid, the building is the first skyscraper by the Pritzker-winning architect in the United States. DeSimone developed a curved "root" exoskeleton structure to support the building. The record setting auger cast pile deep foundation system was installed by HJ Foundation, part of the keller Group. Like with The Grove at Grand Bay project, placing the buildings support systems on the exterior allows for increased space inside and reduces the amount of materials used. The exoskeleton structure was originally purely cosmetic, but DeSimone was able to integrate the design into the structural engineering, creating the exterior support structure out of hollow, precast, concrete panels.

=== Twisting buildings ===
DeSimone engineered the first truly twisting towers in the US with The Grove at Grand Bay towers in Miami, Florida designed by the Danish starchitect Bjarke Ingels. Grove at Grand Bay features two 20-story buildings with 98 apartments that feature 12-foot high ceilings and 14-foot deep balconies. The twisting element of the buildings has a total rotation of 38 degrees, and provides panoramic views of the Biscayne Bay and the Miami skyline.

Like One Thousand Museum, the auger cast pile deep foundation system for this building was by HJ Foundation, part of the Keller Group. The twisting nature of the columns posed a number of structural challenges. The main challenge was to resist torsion generated in the tower core due to the sloping column geometry. The horizontal component of the gravity load in the columns is resolved in the slabs by transferring it to the interior core shear walls, which are the only consistently vertical structural elements in the building. DeSimone was nominated and received a Platinum Award for Structural Systems from the American Council of Engineering Companies in 2016 for their work on The Grove at Grand Bay

=== Skyscrapers and supertalls ===
DeSimone has served as structural engineer for many skyscrapers and is currently working on a supertall building, 125 Greenwich Street designed by Rafael Viñoly which tops out at over 1,000 feet. DeSimone is also the engineering firm behind 99 Hudson Street, an 889-foot residential tower under construction in Jersey City, New Jersey. Upon completion, it will be the tallest building in the state of New Jersey and the 4th tallest residential tower in the United States.

=== Work with "Starchitects" ===
DeSimone has worked on projects with many of the world's most renowned architects and architectural firms including Zaha Hadid, Bjarke Ingels, Richard Meier, Robert A.M. Stern, Foster and Partners, Rafael Viñoly, Rem Koolhas, Office for Metropolitan Architecture (OMA), Skidmore, Owings & Merrill (SOM), Kohn Pedersen Fox (KPF), Arquitectonica, and SLCE.

=== Neom ===
DeSimone is performing structural engineering services for Saudi Arabia's Neom, namely, The Line. It was also announced that the firm was providing the structural engineering consulting for another Neom project: Elanan.

== Sustainability ==
DeSimone is a U.S. Green Building Council (USGBC) National Member organization. DeSimone's work on P.S. 62, The Kathleen Grimm School for Leadership and Sustainability, New York City's first net zero energy school, has received numerous awards including the 2016 AIANY COTE Award, Best Green Project by the Staten Island Chamber of Commerce, Architizer A+ Awards – Primary and High Schools 2016, and Engineering News Record (New York Region) – Best Green Project 2016.

== Mergers and acquisitions ==
=== Henderson Rogers ===
Henderson Rogers' logo

DeSimone's first acquisition would be the April 28, 2020 purchase of Henderson Rogers Structural Engineers. The Houston based firm was previously owned by Ryan Binkley's Generational Equity and specialized in aviation, education, commercial, sports and healthcare facilities. The company was established in 2005, and since that time had worked on over 3,300 projects, for over 400 clients. At the time of the acquisition the firm was being led by principle engineer and president K. Elaine Rogers. DeSimone stated that they had acquired the firm to expand their reach into Texas and the American south as a whole.

=== RRC Engineering ===
RRC Engineering's logo

On September 2, 2020, DeSimone Consulting Engineering announced they had purchased RRC Engineering, a Massachusetts-based structural engineering firm specializing in the design of data centers to diversify the firms holdings and to offer RRC's engineers further resources. RRC Engineering was founded by its eponymous Robert Chartrand in November 2002. Prior to its merger into DeSimone, its profile boasted numerous data centers around the country, as well as the headquarters of the Mobile Press, the Winston-Salem Journal and Bob's Discount Furniture, as well as Tufts University's Equine Center as part of its University of Veterinary medicine. RRC would become DeSimone's Foxborough branch whose principle engineer would remain Robert Chartrand.

=== Fourzero ===
Fourzero's logo

On May 11, 2022, DeSimone announced its acquisition of the Coral Gables based engineering firm Fourzero. Part of the firm's larger expansion into Florida, and southeastern market, Fourzero was founded in 2013 and led by 20 year industry veteran Federico Balestrazzi, who had an extensive record of working with DeSimone's Miami office. Fourzero specialized in façade operations, namely in design, testing, manufacture, estimating, and installation. Fourzero also specialized in designing hurricane-proof structures expanding DeSimone's design capabilities in Hurricane Alley.

=== Dowco ===
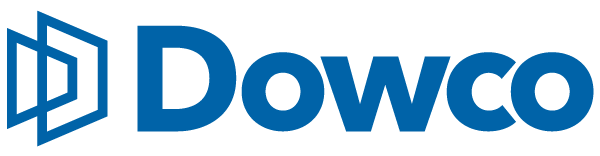
Dowco's logo

On January 6, 2023, DeSimone Consulting Engineering announced they had acquired Dowco, a Langley, British Columbia, based steel detailer for an undisclosed amount. Dowco was founded in June 1970 by Hugh Dobbie, Joe Ord and Jack Wilson (whose last initials spell DOW). The company had been an early adopter of computer-aided design (CAD) and even developed early software as well as running CAD classes. Prior to its acquisition in 2023, Dowco itself underwent several mergers and acquisitions, including Adveno Consultants in 1982, Total Structural Detailing in 2004, FabTrol Systems Inc. in 2008, SDE Steel Detailing and Consulting in 2013, RISA Technologies in 2015, and Acuna y Asociados in 2016 and had offices in Chile, India and the Philippines. DeSimone had acquired the firm in order to have in-house detailers, as opposed to contracting other firms, in order to limit risk to their clients.

=== DP Squared ===
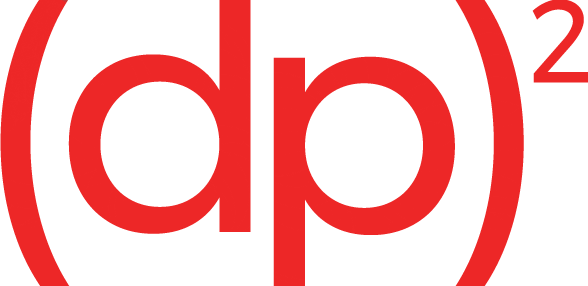
DP Squared's logo

On 1 August 2023, DeSimone acquired DP Squared, a civil engineering firm established by Darren and Deborah Paine in 2004. The firm was headquartered in Hebden Bridge, which will transform into DeSimone's Northern England branch, and has become DeSimone's second branch in the United Kingdom, besides their London branch. DP Squared was known for its environmental and LEEDs initiatives, and for being the structural engineers for Deansgate Square. The firm was noted by New Civil Engineer for punching above their weight, with a relatively small team that has been responsible for the structural engineering of 5 of the 6 tallest buildings in Manchester. They also noted the firms commitment to creating a friendly and inclusive work-space environment. DeSimone acquired the firm to expand their profile in the United Kingdom, mostly due to DP Squared working on projects similar to those DeSimone is known for, and also due to their name recognition in the British civil engineering field.

=== Decipher ===
Decipher's logo

On October 17, 2023, continuing the firm's push to establish themselves in the United Kingdom, DeSimone acquired the Cheshire based construction consultancy Decipher. The group was founded in 2001 and was continuously led by its founder Paul Gibbons. As with DP Squared, Decipher will continue to operate as a brand name of DeSimone, with the moniker "a DeSimone company".

=== MER Engineers ===
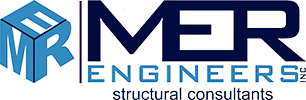
MER Engineers logo

On October 2, 2024, DeSimone acquired the Dayton, Ohio based MER Engineers that specialized in precast and tilt-up design and detailing in an effort to expand DeSimone's offered services to clients. Founded as Steinbicker & Associates in 1982, the firm has worked across the US, Canada, and Caribbean. MER will continue to operate out of Dayton as a DeSimone brand.

=== KP Elevator ===
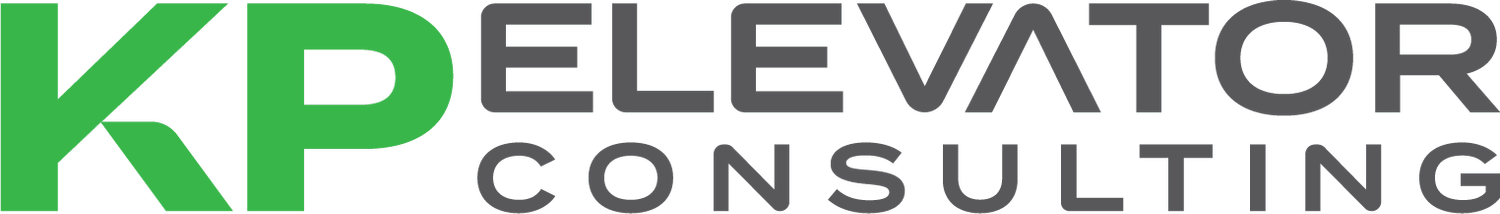
KP Elevator's logo

On April 2, 2025, DeSimone acquired the San Francisco based KP Elevator Consultants whose services included due diligence, concept development, and final construction of Elevators for new construction and renovation. The firm would be merged into DeSimone's existing San Francisco office. DeSimone and KP Elevator had collaborated on several projects, such as 290 Coles St. in Jersey City and is part of DeSimone's continuing strategy to diversify its offerings to clients. KP Elevator's founder was Kelly Houlihan, a 37-year industry veteran and will work at DeSimone as the principle of the new Vertical Transportation team.

=== Constructive Engineering Design ===
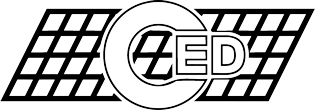
CED's logo

On March 18, 2026, DeSimone acquired Constructive Engineering Design (CED) a Overland Park, Kansas, based firm that specializes in steel procurement, structural engineering, structural connection design, and detailing. Founded in 1992, CED provided services for the construction of One Bloor West, 50 Hudson Yards, and 731 Lexington Avenue. The acquisition continues DeSimone's broader efforts to diversify their offerings to clients namely in data center and infrastructure projects. CED will continue to operate as a DeSimone brand.

== Notable projects ==
- 99 Hudson Street - Jersey City, New Jersey
- 100 11th Avenue - New York, New York
- 100 East 53rd Street - New York, New York
- 1450 Brickell - Miami, Florida
- 17 State Street - New York, New York
- 220 Central Park South - New York, New York
- 360 State Street - New Haven, Connecticut
- 45 East 22nd Street - New York, New York
- 90 West Street - New York, New York
- 900 Biscayne - Miami, Florida
- Akron Art Museum - Akron, Ohio
- Allianz Tower- Abu Dhabu
- Art Gallery of Alberta - Edmonton, Alberta
- Avalon Willoughby Square - Brooklyn, New York
- Casa 74 - New York, New York
- Erie Art Museum Expansion - Erie, Pennsylvania
- Four Seasons Hotel & Tower - Miami Miami, Florida
- IAC Headquarters New York, New York
- Jacksonville Public Library - Jacksonville, Florida
- Las Vegas City Hall - Las Vegas, Nevada
- Marbella South - Jersey City, New Jersey
- Marquis - Miami, Florida
- Millennium Tower - San Francisco, California
- O'Reilly Theater - Pittsburgh, Pennsylvania
- One Thousand Museum Tower - Miami, Florida
- Panorama Tower - Miami, Florida
- Paramount Miami World Center - Miami, Florida
- Santander Bank Building - Miami, Florida
- Sofitel New York - New York, New York
- Taubman Museum of Art - Roanoke, Virginia
- The Cosmopolitan of Las Vegas - Las Vegas, Nevada
- The Modern - Fort Lee, New Jersey
- The Ritz-Carlton Washington D.C. - Washington, DC
- The Standard High Line - New York, New York
- Tower 28 - Queens, New York
- Tropicana Casino & Resort Atlantic City - Atlantic City, New Jersey
- Trump SoHo - New York, New York
- The Dominick - New York, New York
- Madison Square Park Tower - New York, New York
- Selene - New York, New York
- Sheikh Khalifa Bin Zayed Al Nahyan Mosque - Al Ain, United Arab Emirates
- 100 Eleventh Avenue - New York, New York
- 360 State Street - New Haven, Connecticut
- One Thousand Museum - Miami, Florida
- Millennium Tower - Boston, Massachusetts
- The Modern - Jersey City, New Jersey
- 830 Brickell - Miami, Florida
