= Fotografiska New York =

Museum in Manhattan, New York

Coordinates: 40°44′21.4″N 73°59′12.2″W

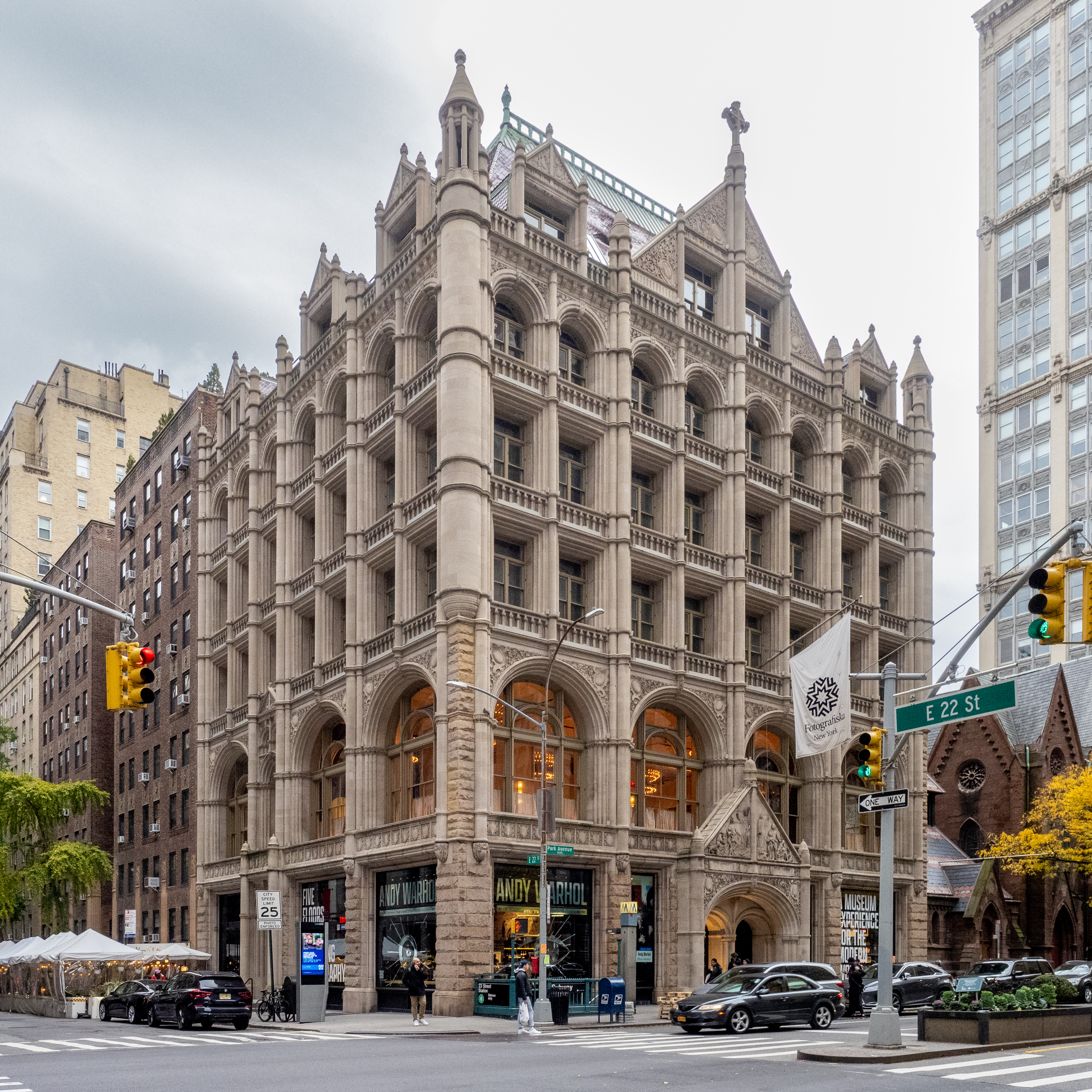
- Located in the Church Missions House from 2019 to 2024
- Established: December 5, 2019
- Dissolved: September 29, 2024
- Location: 281 Park Ave S, Manhattan, NY 10010
- Type: Contemporary photography museum, cafe, and event venue space
- Public transit access: Bus:BM3, BM4, M1; Subway: at 14th Street–Union Square
- Website: newyork.fotografiska.com

Fotografiska New York was a branch of the Swedish photography museum Fotografiska in Gramercy Park, Manhattan, New York City. The museum's home was the Church Missions House, a six-story, 45,000-square-foot (4,200 m^{2}) Romanesque Revival landmark. It opened in December 2019 and closed in 2024.

In addition to galleries, the museum was home to Veronika, a restaurant operated by Stephen Starr. Open for a few months before it paused due to the coronavirus pandemic, Veronika at Fotografiska Museum, according to Time Out was a "high profile, gilded restaurant" that "never truly got going again." It closed on September 1, 2021. A different restaurant subsequently reopened under the same name in the space.

On May 23, 2024, Fotografiska announced it would relocate to an as yet unannounced location as of September 29, 2024. The restaurant and Chapel Bar announced a June 2024 closing date.

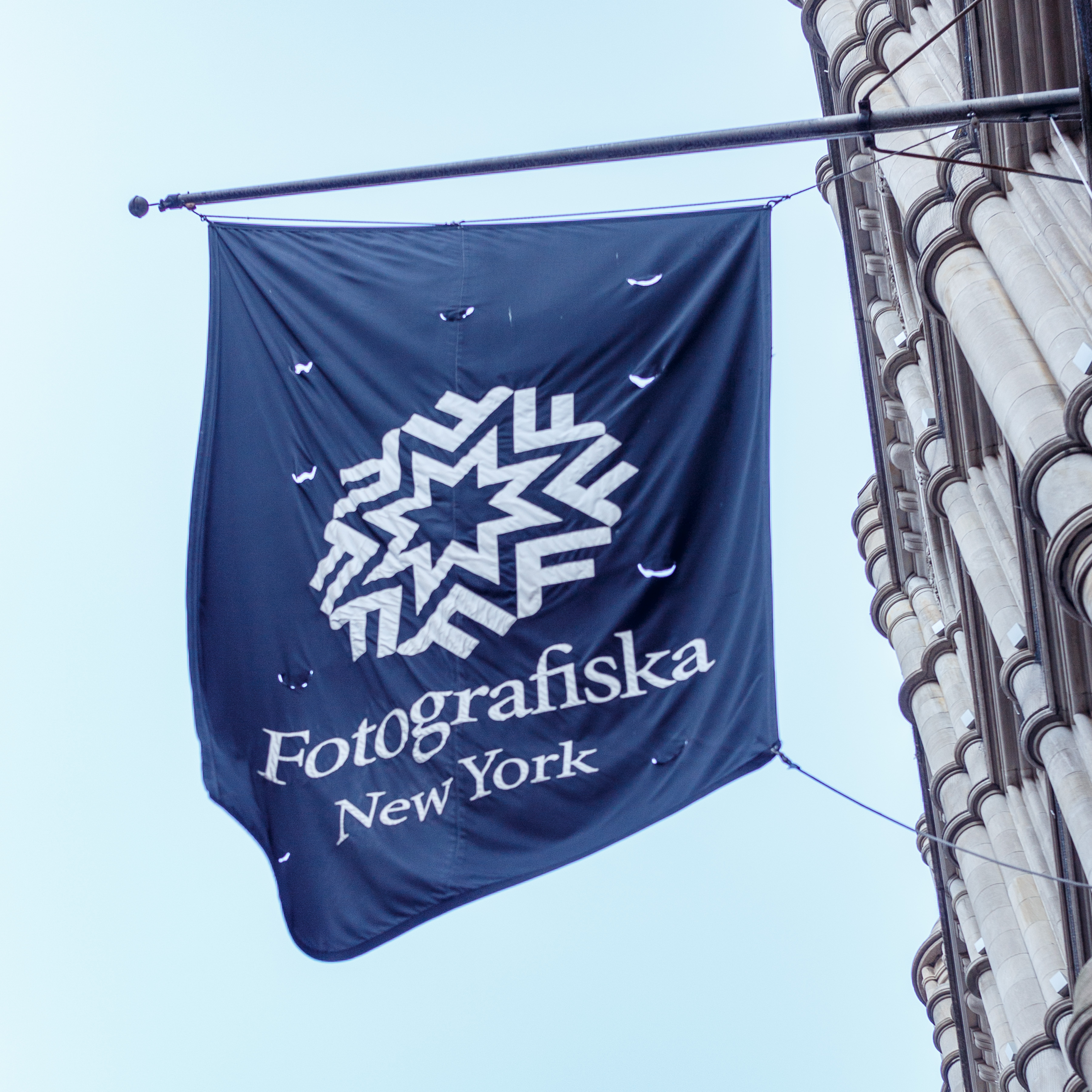
Flag of Fotografiska New York
