= One Thousand Museum =

High-rise condominium in Miami, Florida, US

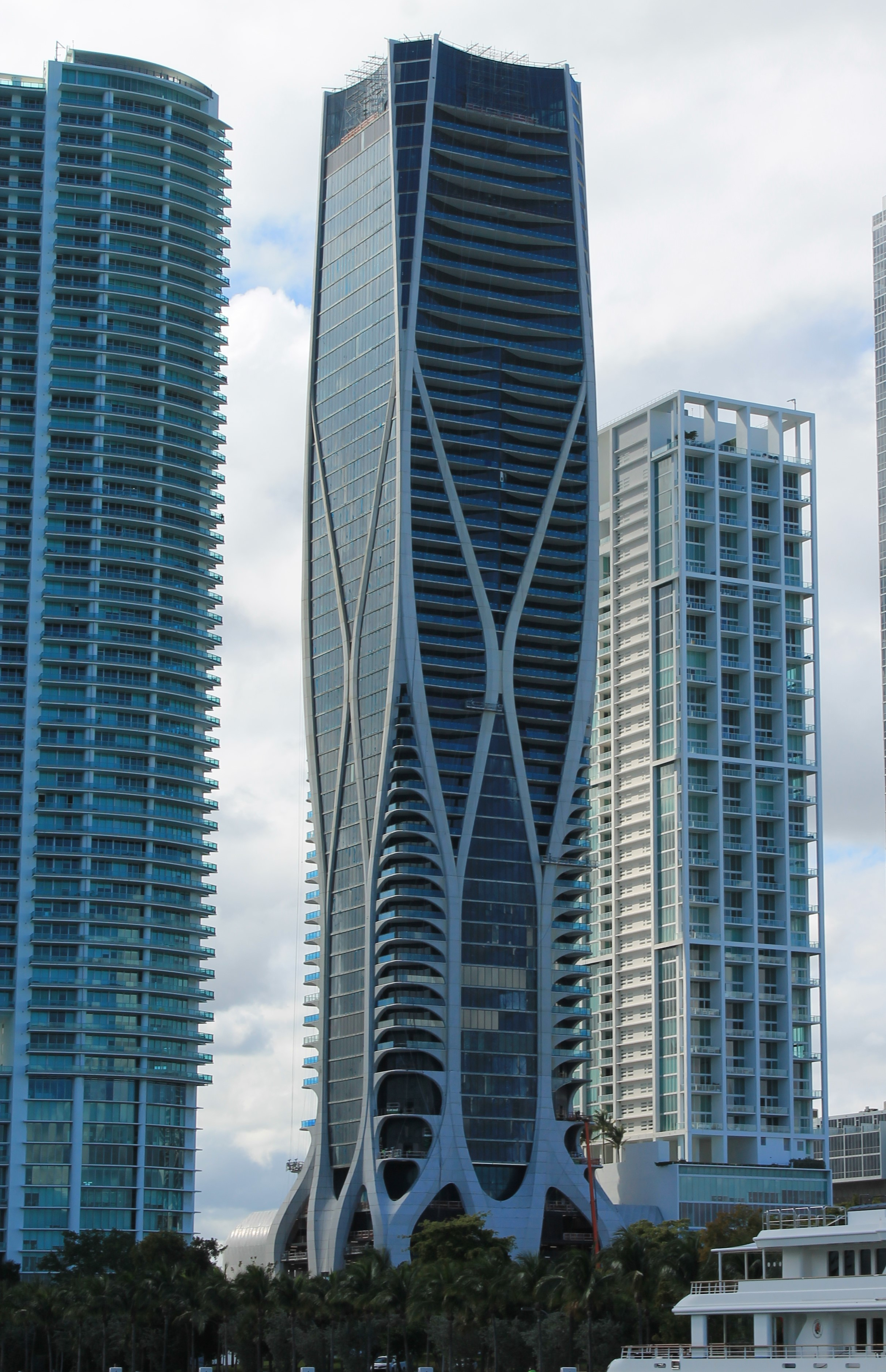
- March 2019

- Location within Florida

General information
- Status: Completed
- Type: Residential
- Location: 1000 Biscayne Boulevard, Miami, Florida, United States
- Coordinates: 25.7841°N 80.1900°W
- Construction started: 2015
- Completed: 2019

Height
- Roof: 707 ft (215 m)

Technical details
- Floor count: 62
- Floor area: 950,000 GFA

Design and construction
- Architect: Zaha Hadid Architects (architect_of_record = ODP Architects & Interior Design)
- Developer: 1000 Biscayne Tower, LLC
- Structural engineer: DeSimone Consulting Engineers
- Main contractor: Plaza Construction

One Thousand Museum, also known as the Scorpion Tower, is a high-rise residential condominium in Miami, Florida, United States. The building, which is located at 1000 Biscayne Boulevard, across from Museum Park, was designed by Zaha Hadid Architects. The initial design was started by Zaha Hadid. Completed in 2019, the 62-story building stands at a height of 707 feet (215 m), making it one of the tallest buildings in Miami.

The deep foundation required drilling to record depths of over 170 feet (52 m) by HJ Foundation, part of the Keller Group. The depths of two auger-cast piles broke a record for Miami-Dade County that had recently been set by HJ Foundation at the Porsche Design Tower in Sunny Isles Beach.

DeSimone Consulting Engineers' exotic design of the structure features a curving exoskeleton partially obscuring the balconies that also serves structural purposes, allowing the interior space to have fewer columns. To meet the architect's designs of smoothness and finish, the columns were finished with glass fiber reinforced concrete permanent form works. The effect of the design and height on wind loading is part of the reason the foundation had to be exceptionally deep. The building is considered ultra-luxury, containing about 84 large units priced at about double the cost per square foot of nearby condominium towers, with amenities possibly including a rooftop helipad.

In early 2018, before the building was finished, an episode of PBS' Impossible Builds featured the building, which they referred to as the "Scorpion Tower", and described it as "one of the most complex skyscrapers ever to make it off the drawing board."

== Design ==
Designed by Iraqi-British architect Zaha Hadid, One Thousand Museum was Zaha Hadid's first residential tower in the Western Hemisphere, and one of the final projects designed by Hadid in her lifetime. It was designed in association with O’Donnell Dannwolf Partners Architects, a local architecture firm.

A notable feature of the building is its curving exoskeleton, which allows the interior space to have fewer columns. The exoskeleton is composed of 5,000 pieces of glass fiber reinforced concrete. These pieces were shipped from Dubai early in the construction process. The exoskeleton is located in front of a glass facade.

The building was topped out in February 2018.

== Facilities ==
The building contains 84 residences, consisting of a two-story duplex penthouse, 4 townhouses, 10 full-floor residences, and 70 half-floor units.

A swimming pool is installed at the top of the building, covered by a curving, faceted metal ceiling that reflects the water. The double-height space is occupied by the pool on one side and a seating area on the other. A similar metallic canopy design is used for the bar. A full two-room treatment spa, hair and beauty salon, acai and juice bar, and sunbathing area are also installed, alongside a multimedia tower.

== Gallery ==
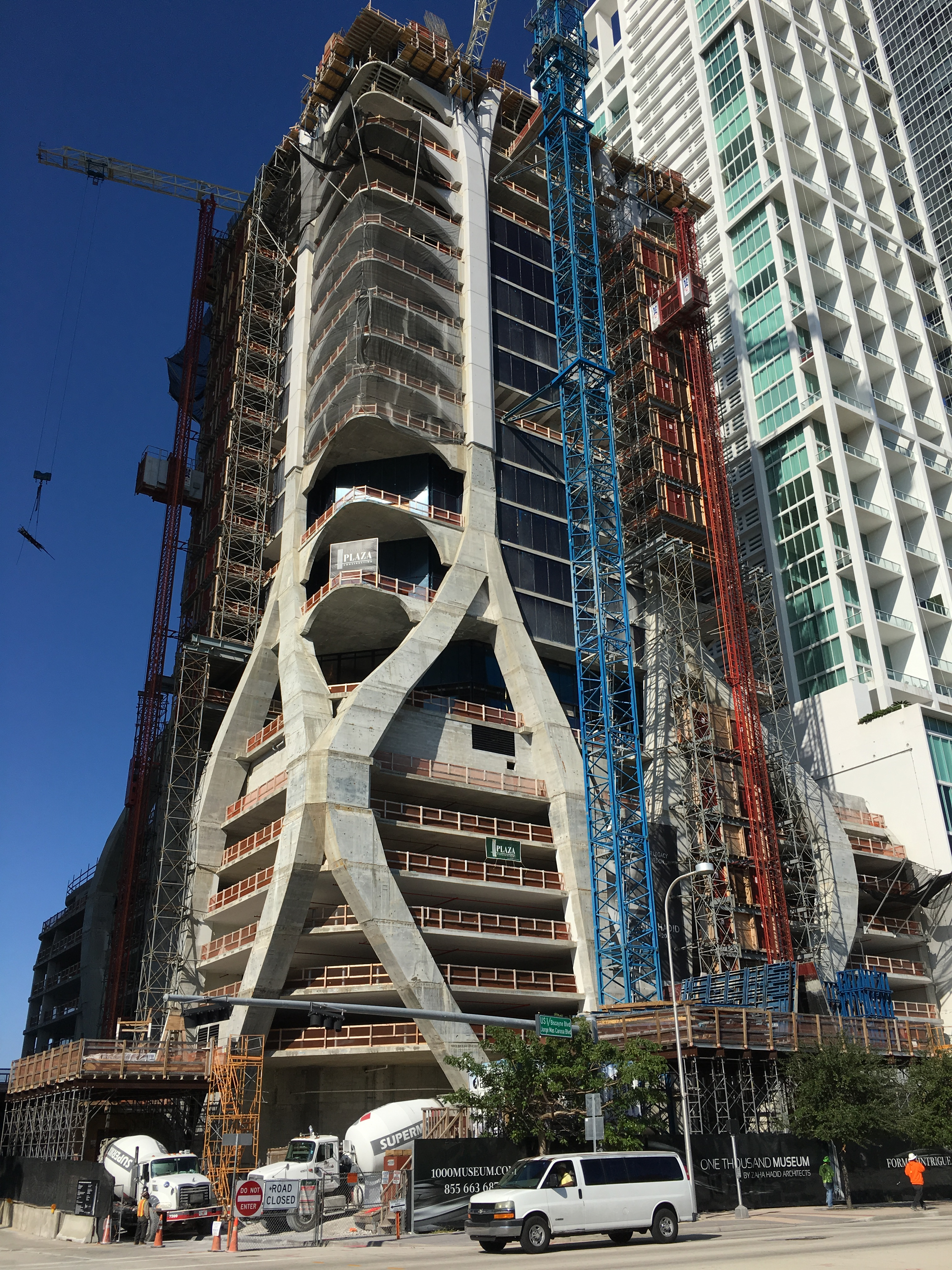
December 2016

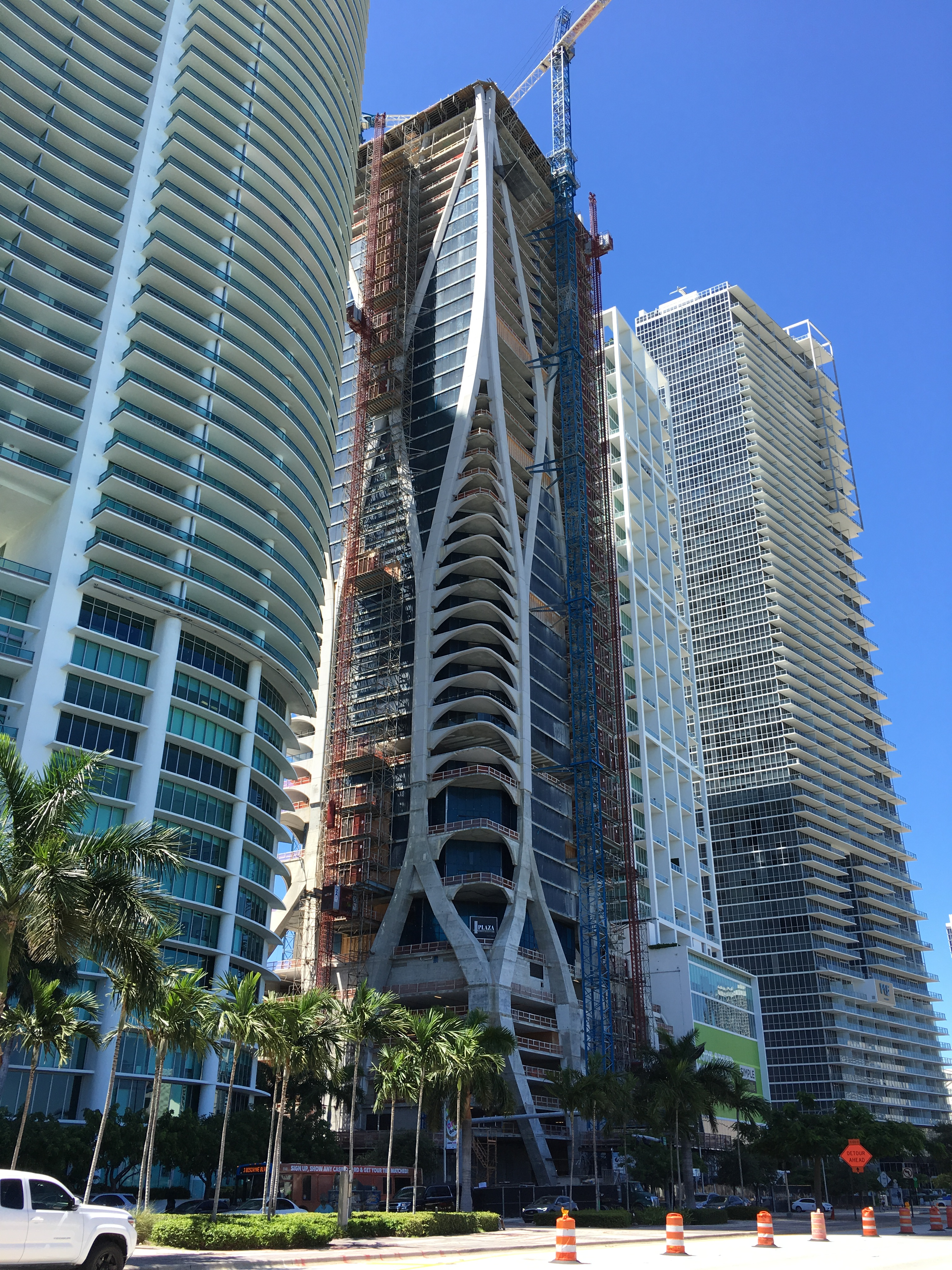
August 2017

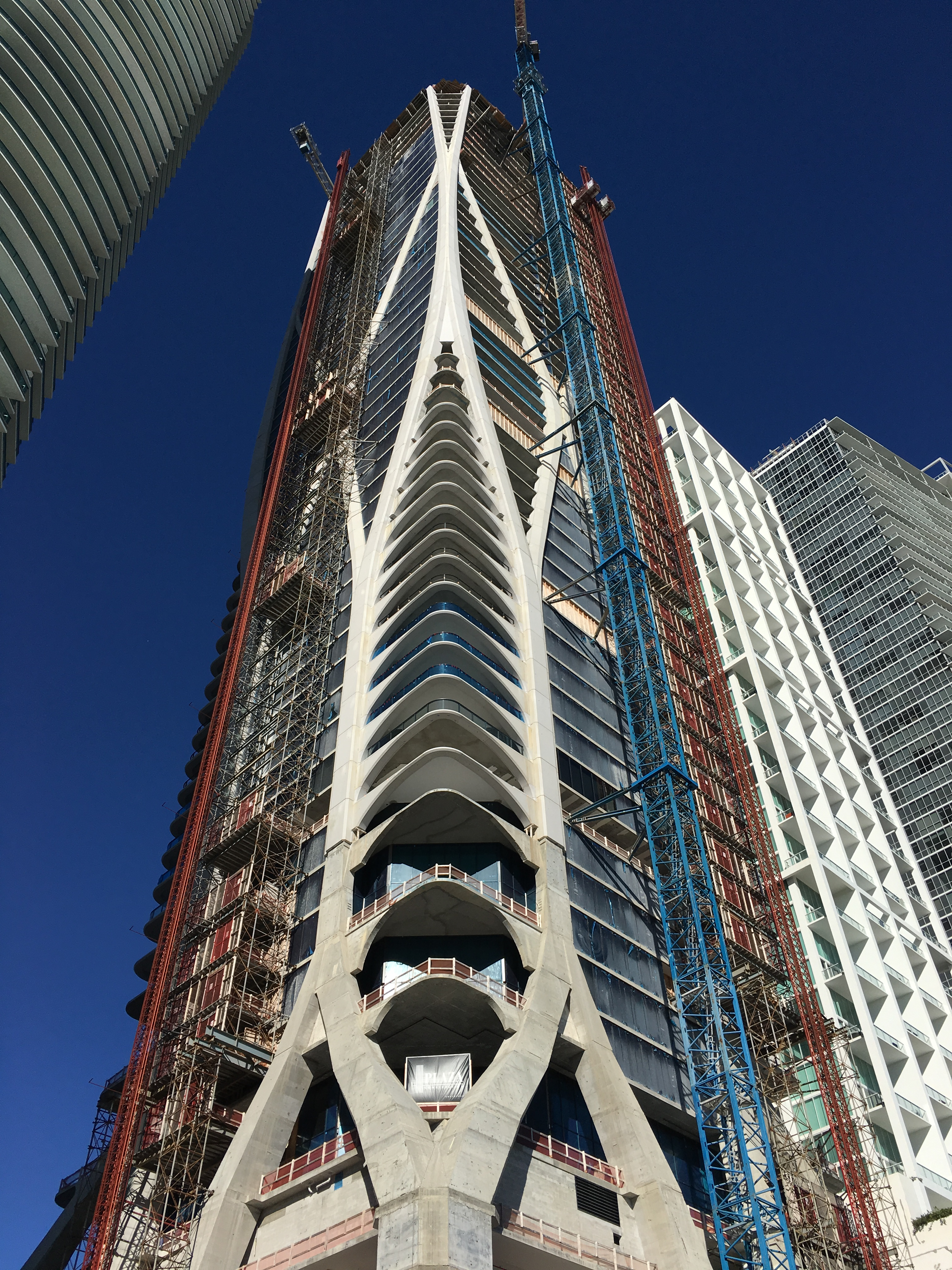
Construction in December 2017 showing the building's exoskeleton

== See also ==
- List of tallest buildings in Miami
- Downtown Miami
- List of tallest buildings in Florida
