= Madison Square Park Tower =

Building in Manhattan, New York

Coordinates: 40.7399°N 73.9872°W

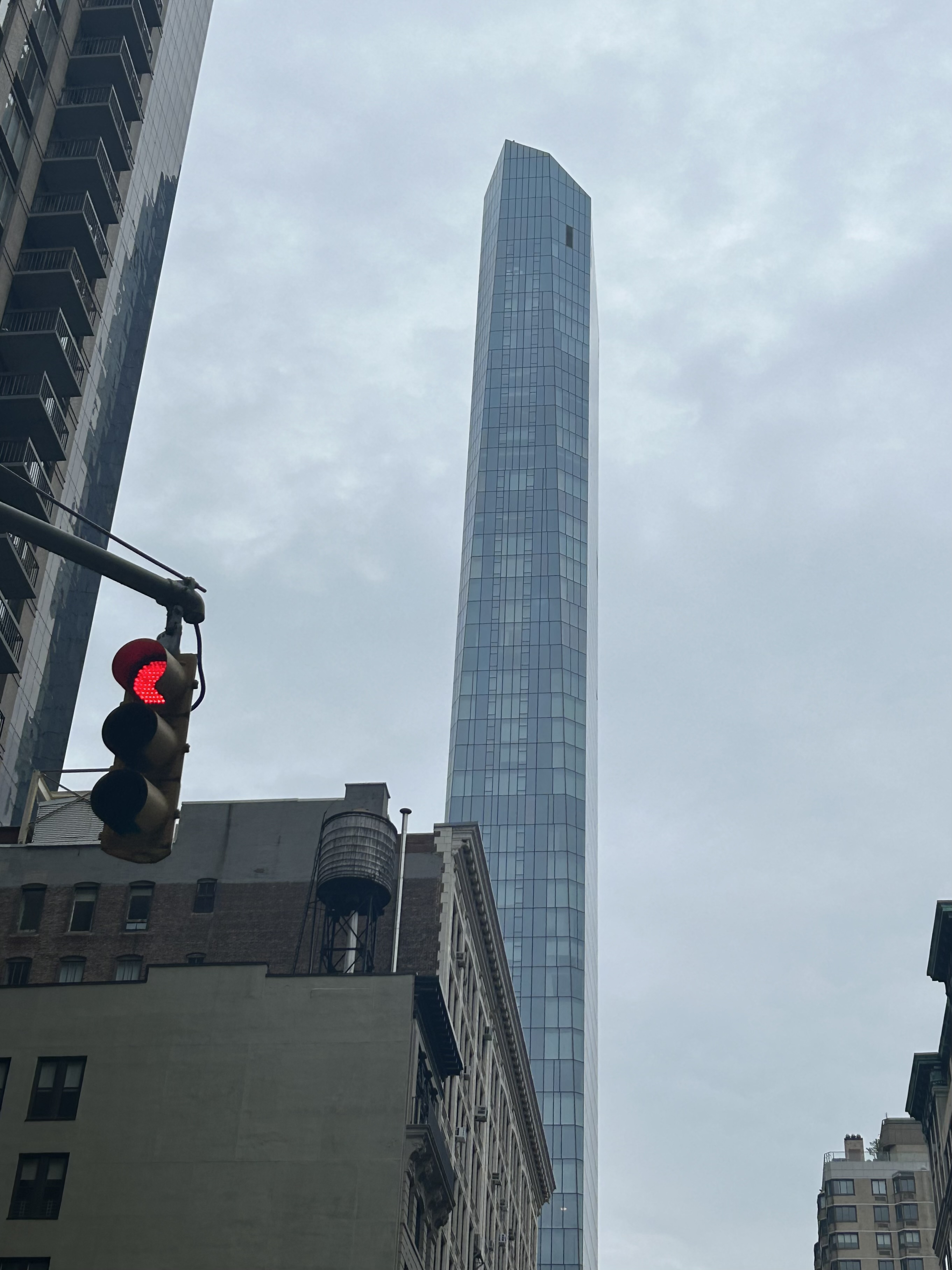
- Seen from the base of the Flatiron Building in May 2024

General information
- Status: Completed
- Type: Mixed use
- Construction started: 2015
- Completed: 2017
- Opening: 2018

Height
- Antenna spire: 777 ft (237 m)
- Top floor: 777 ft (237 m)

Technical details
- Floor count: 60
- Floor area: 372,684 sq ft (34,600 m^{2})

Design and construction
- Architect: Kohn Pedersen Fox
- Structural engineer: DeSimone Consulting Engineers

Website
- madisonsquareparktower.com

Madison Square Park Tower, previously 45 East 22nd Street, is a skyscraper completed in 2017 and located between Broadway and Park Avenue South in the Flatiron District neighborhood of Manhattan, New York City. The building was designed by Kohn Pedersen Fox and developed by Ian Bruce Eichner's Continuum Company. It was the second skyscraper to be built on that block, after One Madison.

== Construction ==
Demolition began on the buildings occupying the lot in April 2014 and was finished by July 2014. Construction finished in 2017.

== Architecture ==
Madison Square Park Tower was designed by Kohn Pedersen Fox and Goldstein, Hill & West Architects. Martin Brudnizki Design Studio is responsible for designing the interiors. There are 83 condominiums in the building.

The base is built from granite in order to resemble other buildings in the Flatiron District. Above the base stands a cantilevered tower that becomes progressively wider as the tower becomes taller. DeSimone Consulting Engineers is the structural engineering firm for the project. The structural system of the building comprises cast-in-place concrete slabs and columns with lateral load resisting shear wall cores. At the roof, there is a 1.2 million pounds (540 thousand kilograms) tuned mass damper which uses viscous liquid and steel plates to dampen the movement of the building during windy conditions for the comfort of occupants.

=== Amenities ===
It has a fitness center on the second through fourth level featuring a basketball court, a golf studio, private training facilities, and a fitness center. Also there is a children's playroom, a library, and a club with a private dining room on the fifty fourth floor. It contains a small garden outside the building.
