= Hill West Architects =

American architecture firm

- Type: Private company
- Industry: Architecture
- Founded: 2009
- Founder: L. Stephen Hill, David West
- Headquarters: New York City
- Number of employees: >100
- Website: www.hillwest.com

Hill West Architects (formerly Goldstein, Hill & West Architects) is a New York City based architecture firm which works on the planning and design of high-rise residential and hospitality buildings, retail structures and multi-use complexes. They have participated in the design of prominent structures in the New York City metropolitan area. The firm was founded in 2009 by Alan Goldstein, L. Stephen Hill and David West.

== History ==
The co-founders of Hill West, L. Stephen Hill and David West, are members of the American Institute of Architects. In 2017, the firm's name was changed from Goldstein, Hill & West Architects to Hill West Architects. The decision to rebrand and rename reflects the retirement of longtime partner, Alan Goldstein, who co-founded Goldstein, Hill & West in 2008.

== Notable projects ==
- Skyline Tower (Queens), 3 Court Square, 2021
- Tower 28, 42-12 28th Street, 2017
- Sky (skyscraper) Sky, 605 West 42nd Street, 2016
- One Riverside Park
- Toy Center Renovation and Conversion, 10 Madison Square West, 2013
- 775 Columbus Avenue
- 795 Columbus Avenue
- 805 Columbus Avenue
- 808 Columbus Avenue
- The Aldyn, 60 Riverside Boulevard
- Silver Towers, 620 West 42nd Street
- The Continental, 885 6th Avenue
- The Rushmore, 80 Riverside Boulevard
- 160 Riverside Boulevard
- 180 Riverside Boulevard
- 161 Maiden Lane

Lead Architect

- Plaza Hotel Renovation and Conversion, 768 Fifth Avenue

Executive Architect

- 130 William Street, 2023
- 11 Hoyt, 2022
- Waterline Square, 2021
- 56 Leonard Street, 2017
- 91 Leonard Street, 2019
- 111 Murray Street, 2018

- 508 West 24th Street, 2014

Source if not otherwise specified:

== Whitehall Interiors NYC ==
In February 2014, Hill West launched Whitehall Interiors NYC, a New York City-based, affiliated interior design firm focused on the creation of interiors for residential and commercial properties. The firm's projects have included the lobby renovation of The Feil Organization's 7 Penn Plaza and 488 Madison Avenue.

== Awards and honors ==
- 2013 - Architectural Record Top 5 Design Firms (#2)
- 2014 - Architectural Record Top 5 Design Firms (#3)
- 2014 - Architectural Record Top 300 Architecture Firms
- 2016 - The Real Deal Top New York Architects 2016
