= Izak Senbahar =

Turkish real estate developer (born 1959)

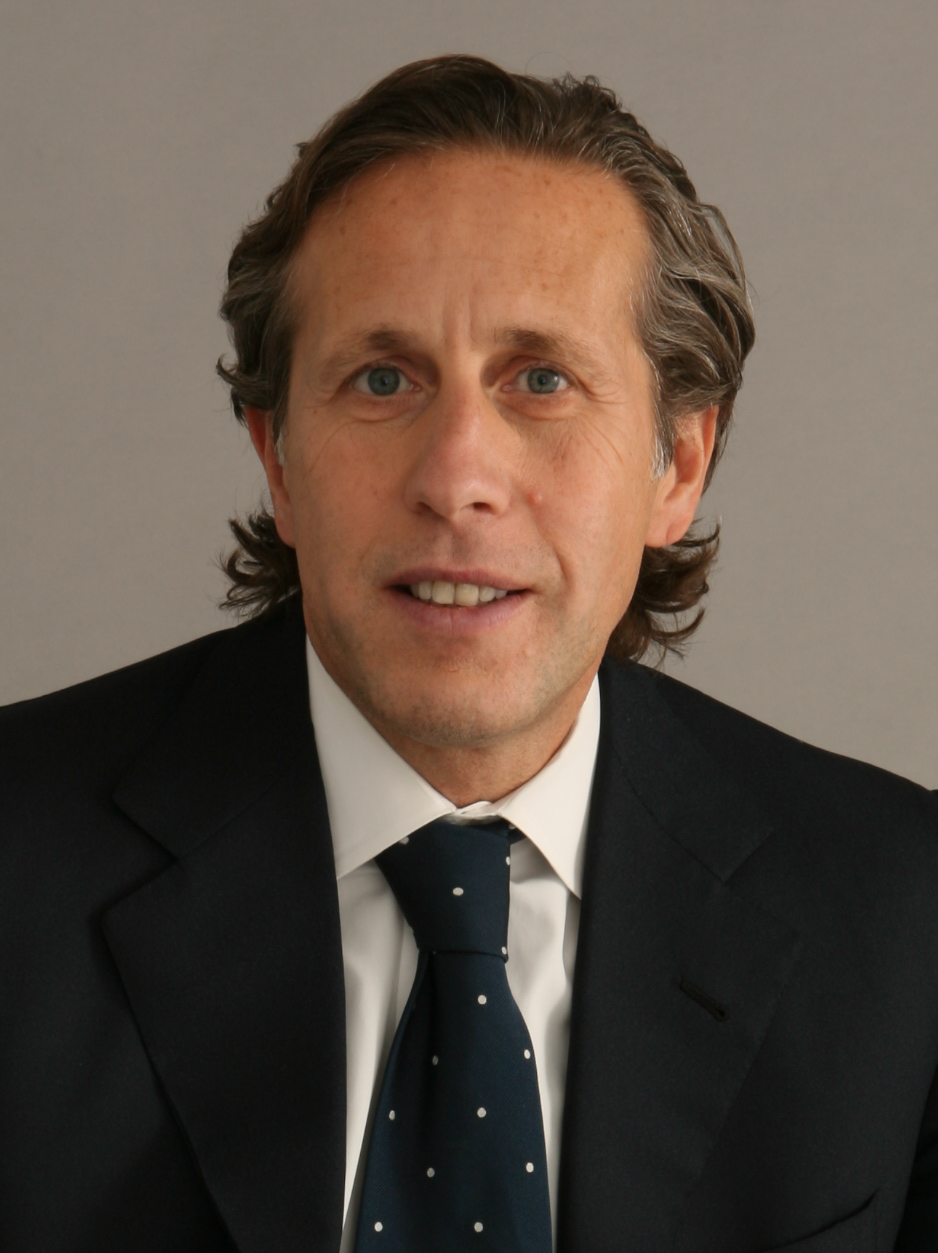
- Senbahar in 2007
- Born: March 21, 1959 (age 67); Istanbul, Turkey
- Education: Catholic University of America, New York University Stern School of Business
- Occupation: Real estate developer
- Known for: Development of 56 Leonard Street building in New York
- Spouse: Sarah Senbahar (née Genske)
- Children: 2, Alexi Senbahar and Oliver Senbahar

Izak Senbahar (born 1959) is an American hotelier and real estate developer. He is president of Alexico Group LLC, which is involved in luxury residential and hotel development. According to The Real Deal magazine, the combined value of the company's projects in 2014 was approximately $2 billion.

== Early life and education ==
Born to a Jewish family in Istanbul, he is the son of Fani and Sabatay Senbahar. Senbahar graduated from Lycée Saint Michel in Istanbul.

He moved to the United States aged 17 in 1977. He obtained a Bachelor's degree in mechanical engineering from Catholic University of America, Washington D.C. and an MBA degree in finance from New York University Stern School of Business.

== Career ==
Before entering real estate, Senbahar worked as a precious metals trader at the New York City offices of Sucres et Denrées (Sucden), a French commodities broker.

In the mid-1980s, he joined Kiska, a Turkish construction firm, to help the company establish itself in the New York real estate market. With Kiska, Senbahar oversaw the development of various properties including 353 Central Park West, a 19-story luxury condominium building.

Subsequently, he partnered with Steven Elghanayan to develop the Elektra, a 32-story condominium in New York City's Gramercy Park neighborhood; the building, completed in 1992, was later sold to Beth Israel Medical Center (now Mount Sinai Beth Israel).

In 1993, Senbahar formed Alexico Group and joint ventured with Simon Elias to develop a number of projects.

== Selected projects ==
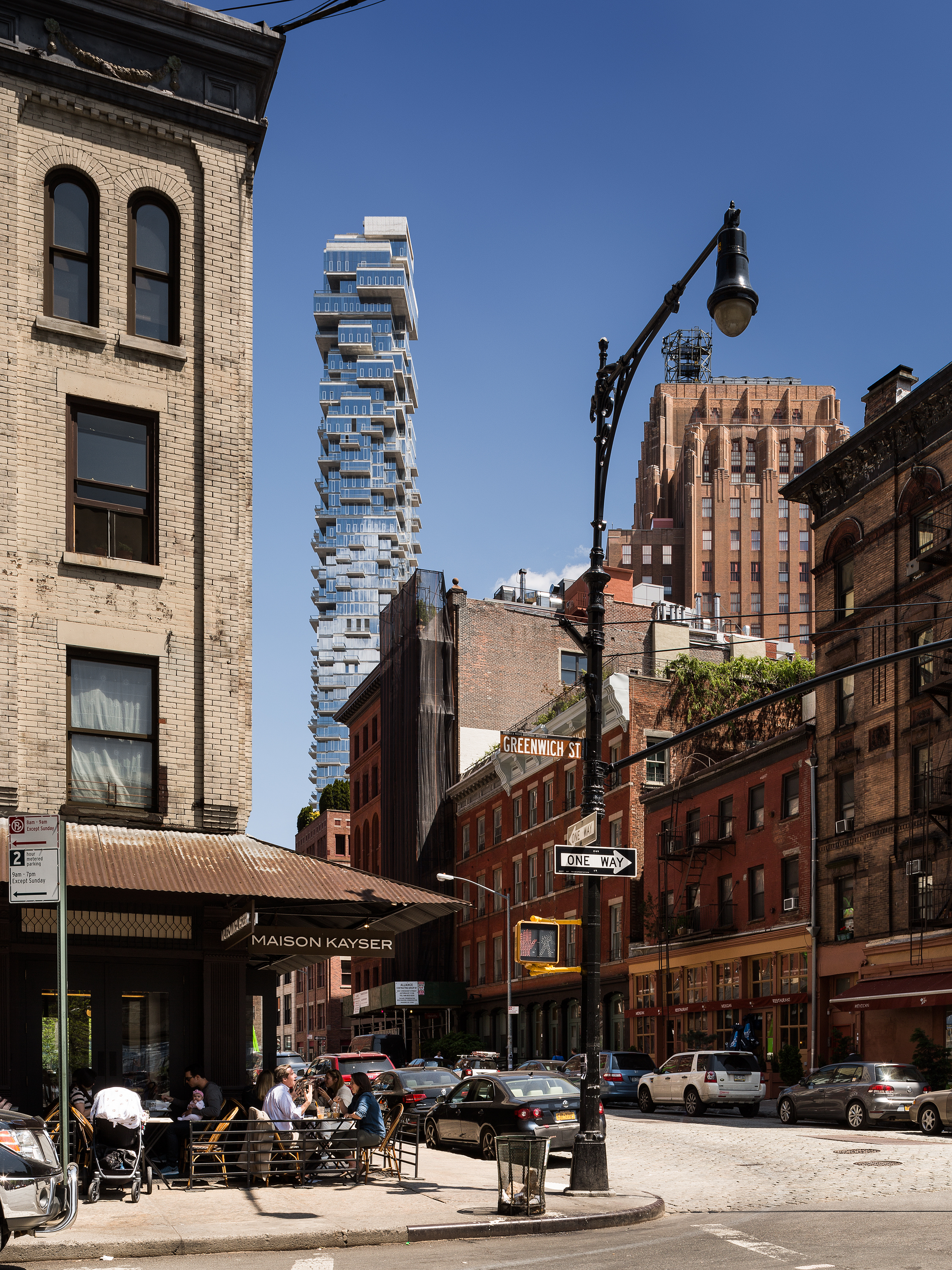
Image of 56 Leonard St. located in New York City

- The Grand Beekman, 2003. This 89-unit luxury condominium at 400 East 51st Street was designed by Costas Kondylis & Partners.
- 165 Charles Street, 2004. Designed by Pritzker Prize–winning architect Richard Meier, the 16-story glass tower in Manhattan's West Village neighborhood won the Housing Design Award from the American Institute of Architects New York chapter.
- The Laurel, 2008. At 400 East 67th Street, this 129-unit condominium was designed by Costas Kondylis & Partners with interiors by Brian Callahan.
- The Mark. Originally built in 1927, this Art Deco building at 25 East 77th Street houses a mix of hotel rooms/suites and cooperative apartments, a Frédéric Fekkai salon, a Jean-Georges restaurant, and a John Lobb Bootmaker kiosk. Its reimagined interiors are by Jacques Grange, known for his commissions for Yves Saint Laurent, Valentino, and Princess Caroline of Monaco. Many other designers and artists—including Eric Schmitt, Mattia Bonetti, Ron Arad, Guy de Rougement, Karl Lagerfeld, Todd Eberle, Patrice Dangel, Howard Spivak, Vladimir Kagan, Piero Lissoni, and Paul Mathieu—contributed to the project.
- In 2017, Bilanz magazine ranked The Mark Hotel as the Best City Hotel in the World. In 2020, Travel + Leisure Magazine ranked The Mark Hotel; #1 Hotel in New York City and #1 City Hotel in The Continental U.S. In 2022, U.S News & World Report ranked The Mark the Best Hotel in New York City. In 2023, Condé Nast Traveler ranked The Mark Hotel on Gold List. In 2024, Tatler Travel Guide ranked The Mark among the Best 101 Hotels in the World. In 2025, Robb Report ranked The Mark #1 out of The 15 Best Hotels in New York City. In 2025, The Mark Hotel was recognized on The World's 50 Best Hotels list - the only property in New York City and one of just two in the United States to receive this distinction.
- 56 Leonard, completed in 2017. Designed by the Swiss architecture firm Herzog & de Meuron, this 60-story condominium tower stands 821 feet high and is the tallest building in Manhattan's Tribeca neighborhood.
- 56 Leonard was awarded the 2017 Engineering Excellence National Recognition Award by ACEC and the 2017 Best Projects Winner in the Residential/Hospitality Category by Engineering News-Record. In 2019, 56 Leonard was named one of New York City's 10 Most Important Buildings of the past decade by Curbed New York, a publication for American real estate and urban design.
- Senbahar commissioned a sculpture at 56 Leonard Street. The sculpture – 48 feet long, 19 feet tall and weighing 40 tons – cost Senbahar $8 million.

== Film and television ==
Senbahar was featured in Season 1, Episode 1 of How Did They Build That?: Cantilevers & Lifts by the Smithsonian Channel. The show is centered on his 56 Leonard building in Tribeca, New York City.

== Personal life ==
He is married to Sarah Genske; they have two children, Alexi and Oliver. In an interview with The Real Deal magazine, Senbahar said that he enjoys "drumming, percussion and bongos."
