= 277 Fifth Avenue =

Residential skyscraper in Manhattan, New York

277 Fifth
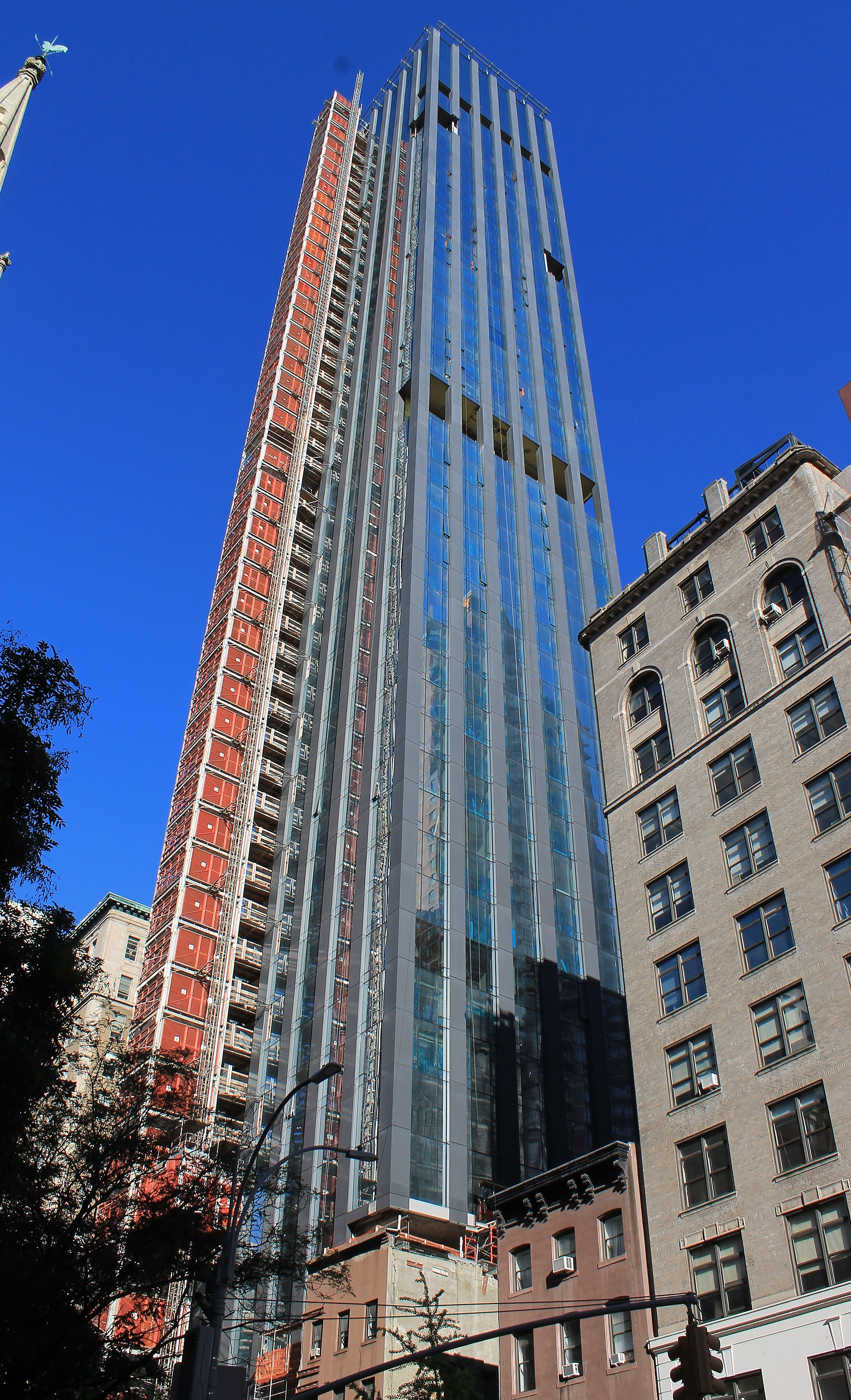
- Seen in October 2018
- Interactive map of the 277 Fifth area
- Alternative names: 281 Fifth Avenue

General information
- Status: Completed
- Architectural style: Modern
- Location: New York City, 277 Fifth Avenue, United States
- Coordinates: 40.745661°N 73.986275°W
- Topped-out: March 2018
- Completed: 2019
- Cost: $470 million

Height
- Height: 673 feet (205 m)

Technical details
- Floor count: 55
- Floor area: 268,441 square feet (24,939.0 m^{2})

Design and construction
- Architect: Rafael Viñoly
- Developer: Lendlease, Victor Group

277 Fifth (also called 281 Fifth Avenue) is a condominium tower in Manhattan, New York City designed by architect Rafael Viñoly. The building rises 55 stories and contains 130 residential condominiums. It is tied with two other buildings, One Grand Central Place and the Barclay Tower as the 94th tallest building in New York at 209 meters. It has been compared to another building of Viñoly's, 432 Park Avenue.

== History ==
In 2012, Kushner Real Estate Group and Ironstate Development acquired the three buildings at 277, 279, and 281 Fifth Avenue. The developers planned a 40-story, 132,000 square feet (12,300 m^{2}) high-end condo building designed by HWKN Architects. Victor Group purchased the site in June 2014 for $99 million and later purchased 273 and 275 Fifth Avenue for $50.3 million. In total, Victor Group reportedly spent a total of $174.1 million for the land and air rights underpinning the project. In early 2015, the Australian Lendlease purchased a stake in the project which valued it at approximately $400 million.

Plans for the building were first announced later in 2015, and construction began in 2016. In February 2017, the developers received a $269 million construction loan from three Singaporean banks including United Overseas Bank, OCBC Bank and DBS Bank. Chinese firm Beijing Shokai Group also invested $100 million in preferred equity in the project.

The building topped out in March 2018 and was completed by the end of the year.

== Usage ==
The building is residential. The building offers a fairly limited set of amenities compared to other, similar buildings.

== See also ==
- List of tallest buildings in New York City
