= 161 Maiden Lane =

Skyscraper in Manhattan, New York

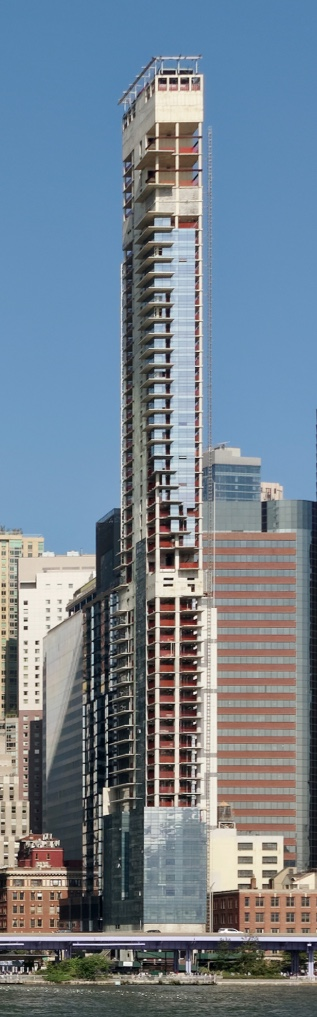
- 161 Maiden Lane, seen from Circle Line Sightseeing boat, October 1, 2023
- Alternative names: 1 Seaport

General information
- Status: On hold
- Type: Residential skyscraper
- Location: 161 Maiden Lane; Manhattan, New York City, United States
- Coordinates: 40°42′20″N 74°00′17″W
- Construction started: 2016
- Estimated completion: On hold

Height
- Roof: 670 ft (205 m)

Technical details
- Floor count: 60

Design and construction
- Architect: Hill West Architects
- Developer: Fortis Property Group
- Structural engineer: WSP Global
- Main contractor: Pizzarotti (until 2019); Ray Builders (2019–2020)

161 Maiden Lane (also known as One Seaport, 1 Seaport, Seaport Residences, or The Leaning Tower of New York) is an incomplete 670-foot-tall (200 m) residential skyscraper on Maiden Lane in the Financial District of Manhattan, New York City, United States. Designed by Hill West Architects, the building overlooks the East River and topped out in September 2018. The building leans three inches (76mm) to the north as a result of the method used to construct its foundation: instead of using deep pilings like neighboring skyscrapers, soil improvement methods were used. As of 2024, only half of the finishes, including windows, have been installed.

== Architecture ==
The building was designed by Hill West Architects and interior designer Groves & Co. According to The Wall Street Journal, 161 Maiden Lane's design includes a porte-cochère and a glass curtain wall. In addition, the building is planned to have a health club with a spa, fitness center, and infinity pool. The 60-story structure rises 670 ft (205 m). It would have 200,000 ft^{2} (19,000 m^{2}) of space, including 80 residential condominiums. Plans also call for the building to contain 17 storage units, which would be sold to residents.

The site was created in the 17th century as part of a program of land reclamation in Lower Manhattan. As a result, the underlying site is made of various debris, followed by a layer of marshland, pockets of glacial sand deposits, and decomposed rock. The underlying layer of bedrock is approximately 155 feet (47 m) below ground level. The foundation was constructed using a soil improvement method, where material is added to the soil to strengthen it, rather than the piling method, as used by all neighboring skyscrapers. The soil-improvement method ostensibly was intended to reduce the construction costs by US$6 million (equivalent to $8.0 million in 2025), though it also resulted in uneven settlement, which later caused the tower to lean.

== History ==
=== Site acquisition ===
As early as 2007, Bluerock Properties had proposed a 52-story building at 161 Maiden Lane, near the shore of the East River, in the Financial District of Lower Manhattan in New York City. Bluerock planned to have the tower designed by Rogers Marvel Architects. New York City's zoning regulations allowed a building of up to 249,242 ft^{2} (23,155.3 m^{2}) on the site, of which up to 138,468 ft^{2} (12,864.1 m^{2}) could be used as apartments.

In 2011, Kay Development bought the site for US$41.2 million (equivalent to $58.0 million in 2025). the company had planned to develop a 40-story building, the Seaborne, on the site; the building would have contained 175 apartments. This structure would have been designed by architect John Fotiadis. Kay Development placed the land for sale in May 2013 and Fortis Property Group bought the site at 151–161 Maiden Lane in September 2013, paying $64 million (equivalent to $87 million in 2025) for the 11,539 ft^{2} (1,072.0 m^{2}) lot.

=== Construction ===
Construction of the building, then known as One Seaport Residences, began in July 2015. Jack Resnick & Sons, which owned the similarly named One Seaport Plaza at 199 Water Street, sued Fortis for trademark infringement that September. The two firms came to an agreement in December 2015, when Fortis agreed to market the building using the numeral version of the name, 1 Seaport, for a limited period. After that period had ended, Fortis could not market the building as either "One Seaport" or "1 Seaport". Fortis submitted a condominium offering plan for the building to the New York Real Estate Finance Bureau, which approved the plan in late February 2016. Fortis estimated that it would be able to sell 80 condos for a total of $272 million. Fortis hired the Italian firm Pizzarotti as general contractor, likely in part because of Pizzarotti's low rates. SSC High Rise was hired as the concrete subcontractor.

Condo sales launched in April 2016, with the cheapest being offered for $1.2 million. Twenty percent of the units were in contract within one day. At the time, the structure was supposed to open in early 2018. Swedish real estate broker Fredrik Eklund was among the earliest condominium buyers, acquiring a duplex on the 46th and 47th floors. Fortis offered to make Eklund a monopoly on marketing the building's condos, provided that he was able to sell one-quarter of the units in eight weeks. Eklund opened a sales office in London after contemplating opening offices in other cities around the world.

Bank Leumi USA, a subsidiary of Bank Leumi, gave Fortis a $90 million construction loan for the property in June 2016. To attract buyers, Fortis announced a partnership with Hinckley Yachts in late 2016, renting three luxury yachts to condominium owners. Under the terms of its condo offering plan, Fortis was to have finalized the first condo sales in January 2018. If Fortis had failed to finalize any contracts by June 2018, the developer had to provide an updated budget; buyers could renege on their contracts if the project had overrun its $273 million budget by at least 25 percent.

==== Construction issues and delays ====
Between January and September 2017, the New York City Department of Buildings (DOB) issued 10 building-code violations to Pizzarotti. Construction workers in labor unions also protested outside the building, mounting an inflatable rat to protest the fact that non-unionized laborers were employed at 161 Maiden Lane. An employee of SSC High Rise died in September 2017 after falling from the building's 29th floor. Investigators determined that the employee had unhooked his safety harness after it was jammed in a scaffolding platform and that an SSC foreman had ordered the platform to be moved with workers on it, causing the employee to fall to his death. Because it is against New York City building code to move a platform with workers on it, SSC pleaded guilty to manslaughter in July 2018. The firm was ordered to pay $10,000, the maximum fine that could be levied for building-code violations in New York state. Following the incident, the project was halted indefinitely; two-thirds of the condos had already gone into contract.

Work resumed in December 2017. The next month, the DOB issued two stop-work orders due to incorrectly installed construction netting. By January 2018, Fortis planned to obtain $185 million in construction financing for 161 Maiden Lane. RC Structures replaced SSC as the concrete subcontractor, though sources disagree on whether SSC was fired or whether its employees refused to come to work. In any case, work resumed soon after, even though Pizzarotti had received a memo that April, indicating that the building was leaning 3 inches (76 mm) to its north. Construction was paused again that April after a concrete bucket hit the 34th floor, poured concrete onto the street, and lifted part of the 34th-story deck. Exacerbating the building's structural issues, contractors poured the upper stories' concrete slabs unevenly, in an attempt to cancel out the building's lean. This led Pizzarotti's lawyer to compare the building's shape to a banana.

The building topped out during September 2018. The same month, Mack Real Estate gave Fortis a $66 million mezzanine loan for the property. At the time, potential buyers had signed contracts for 72 of the building's 98 condominiums. Pizzarotti sued Fortis in March 2019 over the building's northward lean. By then, Pizzarotti was no longer employed as the general contractor. According to local website New York YIMBY, work on the building had been halted for several months. Pizzarotti claimed that, due to the developers' use of soil improvement to construct the foundation, the building had settled unevenly, causing it to tilt; a subcontractor first noticed the issue in April 2018. Pizzarotti claimed that it had difficulties installing the glass curtain wall because of the building's lean and that a continued lean would result in non-functioning windows, faulty elevators, and bad waterproofing.

Fortis filed a countersuit that May, blaming Pizzarotti for not properly surveying the construction site and for failing to ensure workers' safety. The developer hired engineering firms WSP Global and Arup Group, which both concluded that the building's lean did not compromise its structural integrity. Ray Builders, which replaced Pizzarotti as general contractor, designed a glass curtain wall that accommodated the lean. In June 2019, Fortis notified condominium buyers that the building was leaning about 8 inches (200 mm) to the north.

==== Work halts ====
Ray Builders stopped working on the project in July 2020, claiming that Fortis had failed to pay its workers. The next month, Fortis sued Bank Leumi, claiming that the bank had failed to distribute part of the loan as scheduled. Bank Leumi had placed the project's $120 million construction loan for sale in October 2020, and the bank was foreclosing on the loan by the end of that year. Due to the continuing delays, by February 2021, all except six of the condo buyers had reneged on their contracts. In addition, because the upper stories had not yet been enclosed, they were vulnerable to temperature changes and weather. A state judge appointed a receiver to secure the site in May 2021, as the lawsuits proceeded. Ray resigned as general contractor, and Engel Burman Construction was hired to secure the construction site. Richard Cohn was also appointed as the abandoned tower's manager.

Bank Leumi and Fortis agreed to mediation in August 2021. Both the lender and the developer had withdrawn from mediation by March 2022, when a lawyer for Bank Leumi said the "parties were too far apart in discussions to reach any resolution". Mack Real Estate sued Fortis, Harel Insurance Company, and Valley National Bank (which had acquired Bank Leumi's United States division) in September 2022. Mack claimed that Harel and Bank Leumi had fraudulently misused the $66 million mezzanine loan that Mack had placed on the project. The project remained halted as of late 2022, in part due to continuing litigation over the site. By mid-2023, the building had not had a working standpipe for over a year, making it difficult to put out any fires that might start in the tower.

In August 2023, a judge ordered Fortis and Valley National to resume mediation. By that October, Shelly Listokin, who had previously agreed to buy the loans on the property, had filed for Chapter 11 bankruptcy protection to avoid buying the loans. Fortis was also sued by its own lawyers that December, as the developer had not paid its legal team. Although there was no imminent safety risk at the tower, there were still concerns over how much the tower would move after cladding was completed. Three graffiti artists had spray-painted the upper part of the facade; The New Yorker quoted one of these artists as saying that the building completely lacked a security detail. By 2025, there were several ongoing lawsuits over the building, which had cost $250 million to date.
