= Pizzarotti =

Pizzarotti is a surname. Notable people with the surname include:

- Federico Pizzarotti (born 1973), Italian politician and mayor of Parma

== See also ==
- Impresa Pizzarotti, construction and civil engineering company based in Parma, Italy
