= Louis Kestenbaum =

American real estate developer (born 1952)

- Born: 1952 (age 72–73)
- Occupation: Real Estate Developer
- Known for: Founder of Fortis Property Group
- Spouse: married
- Children: Joel Kestenbaum
- Parent: Zvi Kestenbaum
- Website: fortispropertygroup.com

Louis Kestenbaum (born 1952) is an American real estate developer who is the founder and chairman of New York City-based Fortis Property Group.

== Biography ==
Kestenbaum was born to a Hasidic Jewish family, the son of Rabbi Zvi Kestenbaum. His father lost most of his family in the Holocaust and founded the ODA Primary Health Care Network, a federally subsidized health care center that serves the Hasidic community in South Williamsburg. He is a follower of the Satmar Hasidic dynasty.

Kestenbaum operated a sportswear company. In the early 1980s, Kestenbaum paid $4 million for Austin, Nichols and Company Warehouse, a vacant 500,000-square-foot industrial property at 184 Kent Avenue in Williamsburg, Brooklyn. He used part of the building for his company and leased the remainder. Kestenbaum later converted the building to apartments and tripled his rental income using the proceeds to buy other properties in the neighborhood. He went on to develop Northside Piers in Williamsburg.

In 2004, he co-founded the Fortis Property Group with his son and Jonathan Landau, a modern Orthodox Jewish attorney from Cleveland, Ohio. Within two years, the company acquired over $3 billion in properties, primarily Class A office buildings in Dallas, Boston, and Norfolk, Connecticut. In 2009, Kestenbaum purchased a portion of the real estate portfolio of prolific Brooklyn real estate developer Isaac Hager who declared bankruptcy. Initially focusing on smaller projects and asset purchases, in the early 2010s, he began a ground-up development.

Since its founding, Fortis has acquired or developed more than $3 billion of commercial real estate across the United States.

== Projects ==
Development projects he has been involved with include:

- The redevelopment of Long Island College Hospital in Cobble Hill, Brooklyn.
- 161 Maiden Lane. Failed.

== Personal life ==
His son, Joel Kestenbaum, works with him at Fortis. Kestenbaum has continued the work of his father who restored more than 50 Jewish cemeteries in eastern Europe.
