= 56 Leonard Street =

Residential skyscraper in Manhattan, New York

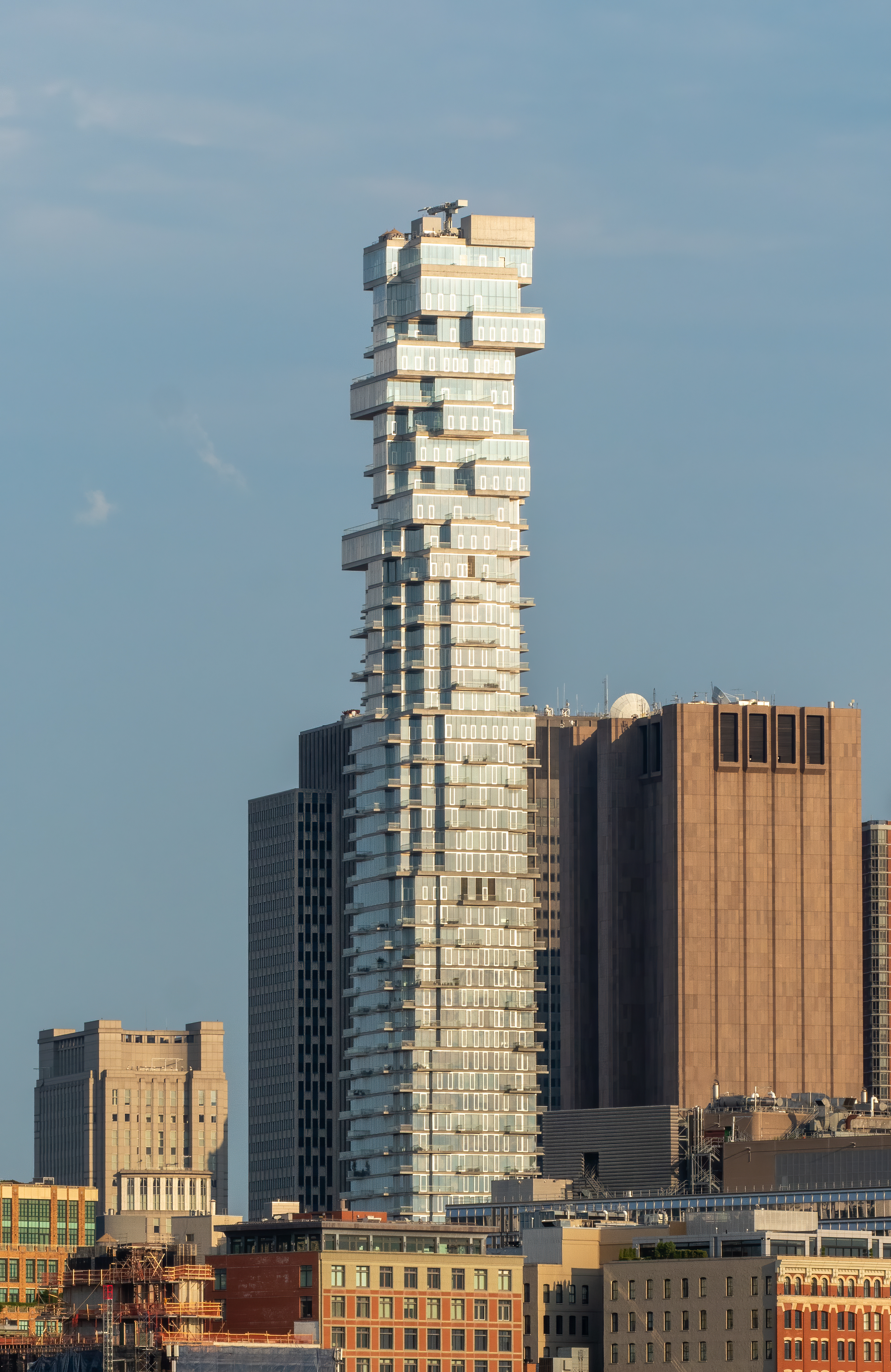
- View from the Hudson River, 2021

General information
- Status: Completed
- Type: Residential condominium
- Architectural style: High-Tech
- Location: Manhattan, New York, U.S.
- Coordinates: 40.71767°N 74.00637°W
- Construction started: Mid-2007
- Completed: 2017
- Opening: 2017

Height
- Roof: 821 ft (250 m)
- Top floor: 796 ft (243 m)

Technical details
- Floor count: 60
- Floor area: 500,005 sq ft (46,452.0 m^{2})

Design and construction
- Architects: Herzog & de Meuron; Goldstein, Hill & West Architects
- Developer: Alexico Group
- Structural engineer: WSP Global

Website
- 56leonardtribeca.com

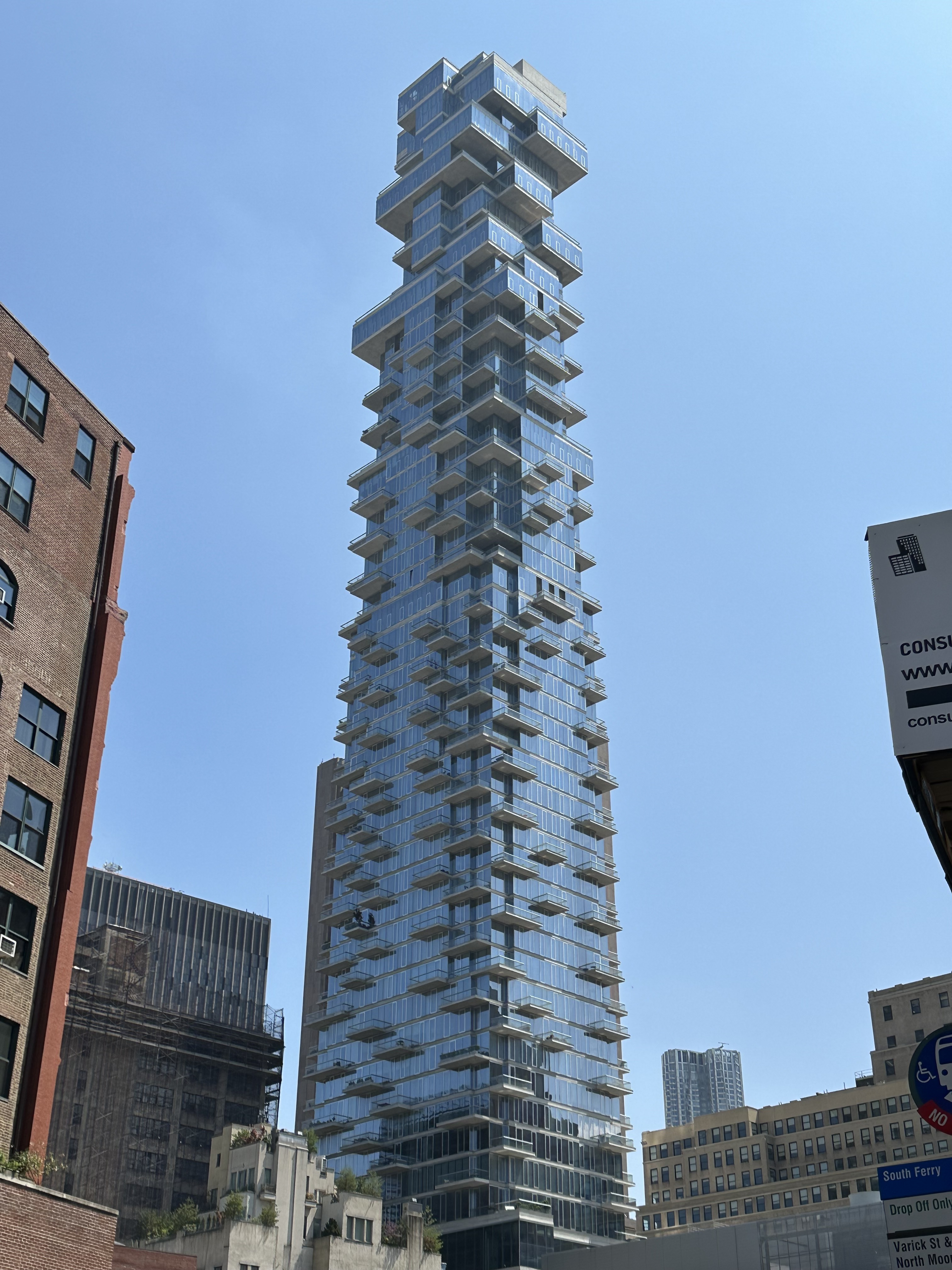
View of 56 Leonard Street from Franklin St in Tribeca

56 Leonard Street (known colloquially as the Jenga Building or Jenga Tower) is an 821 ft-tall (250 m), 57-story skyscraper on Leonard Street in the neighborhood of Tribeca in Manhattan, New York City. Completed in 2017, the building was designed by the Swiss architecture firm Herzog & de Meuron, which describes the building as "houses stacked in the sky." It is the tallest structure in Tribeca.

The tower's penthouse, contracted for US$47 million in 2013, is the most expensive residential property ever sold below Midtown Manhattan.

== History ==
Alexico Group's Izak Senbahar purchased the land and the air rights in 2007 from the New York Law School for US$150 million. Construction began that same year. Foundation work on this tower began in 2008, but was shut down before the end of the year when the project was put on hold. After nearly four years, construction resumed in October 2012.

In 2013, the developers secured a US$350 million loan from a syndicate led by Bank of America.

As of May 2013, 70% of the building had sold. According to building developer Izak Senbahar, the building was 92% sold in seven months. In June 2013, a penthouse at 56 Leonard went into contract for US$47 million, making it the most expensive residential property ever sold below Midtown Manhattan. In 2024, it was reported that the value of a residence at 56 Leonard Street had nearly doubled over four years.

On September 2, 2022, Venezuelan businessman Gustavo Arnal jumped to his death from his apartment on the 18th floor. Arnal was serving as the chief financial officer of Bed Bath & Beyond, which had been in a financial crisis for the past few months. Arnal was also one of the targets of a class action lawsuit regarding Bed Bath & Beyond's stock price.

== Architecture ==
56 Leonard is designed by the 2001 Pritzker Prize-winning Swiss architecture firm Herzog & de Meuron. Anish Kapoor, known for the public sculpture Cloud Gate in Chicago, designed a similar sculpture to sit at the base of the building. Herzog & de Meuron also designed the building's interiors, which include custom-designed kitchens, fixtures, bathrooms, and fireplaces. Goldstein, Hill & West Architects LLP is the architect of record.

=== Interior ===
There is 17,000 ft^{2} (1,600 m^{2}) of amenity spaces on the ninth and tenth floors, including a 75 ft (23 m) pool, a 25-seat screening room, a private dining room, and a children's playroom. The building has a total of ten elevators; owners will share a hallway with at most one other apartment. The developers also figured a generator on the ninth floor into the plans. There are eight full-floor apartments at the top, ranging from 5,200 to 6,400 ft^{2} (480 to 590 m^{2}), with 14-to-19 ft-high (4.3-to-5.8 m) ceilings. In addition, the building features a double-height lobby sheathed in "gleaming" black granite.

The designer of 56 Leonard specified a unique high-end expanded mesh ceiling for the recreational areas, helping these areas feel elevated and special. Expanded mesh metal ceilings are usually acoustically transparent and do not contribute to echoes, and will not corrode in high-moisture areas.

=== Exterior ===
In February 2023, an Anish Kapoor sculpture, superficially similar to his Cloud Gate work, was unveiled at the ground level, following four years of on-site construction and delays. Measuring 19 feet in height, 48 feet in (curved) length, and weighing 40 tons, the sculpture was commissioned in 2008 at an estimated cost of $8–10 million.

== Awards ==
- 2017 Engineering Excellence National Recognition Award by ACEC
- 2017 Best Projects Winner in the Residential/ Hospitality Category by Engineering News-Record
- 2019 Named as one of New York City’s 10 Most Important Buildings of the Past Decade, Curbed New York, a publication for American real estate and urban design.

== In media ==
The building was featured in Season 1, Episode 1 of How Did They Build That?: Cantilevers & Lifts by the Smithsonian Channel.

== See also ==
- List of tallest buildings in New York City
