= One Grand Central Place =

Office skyscraper in Manhattan, New York

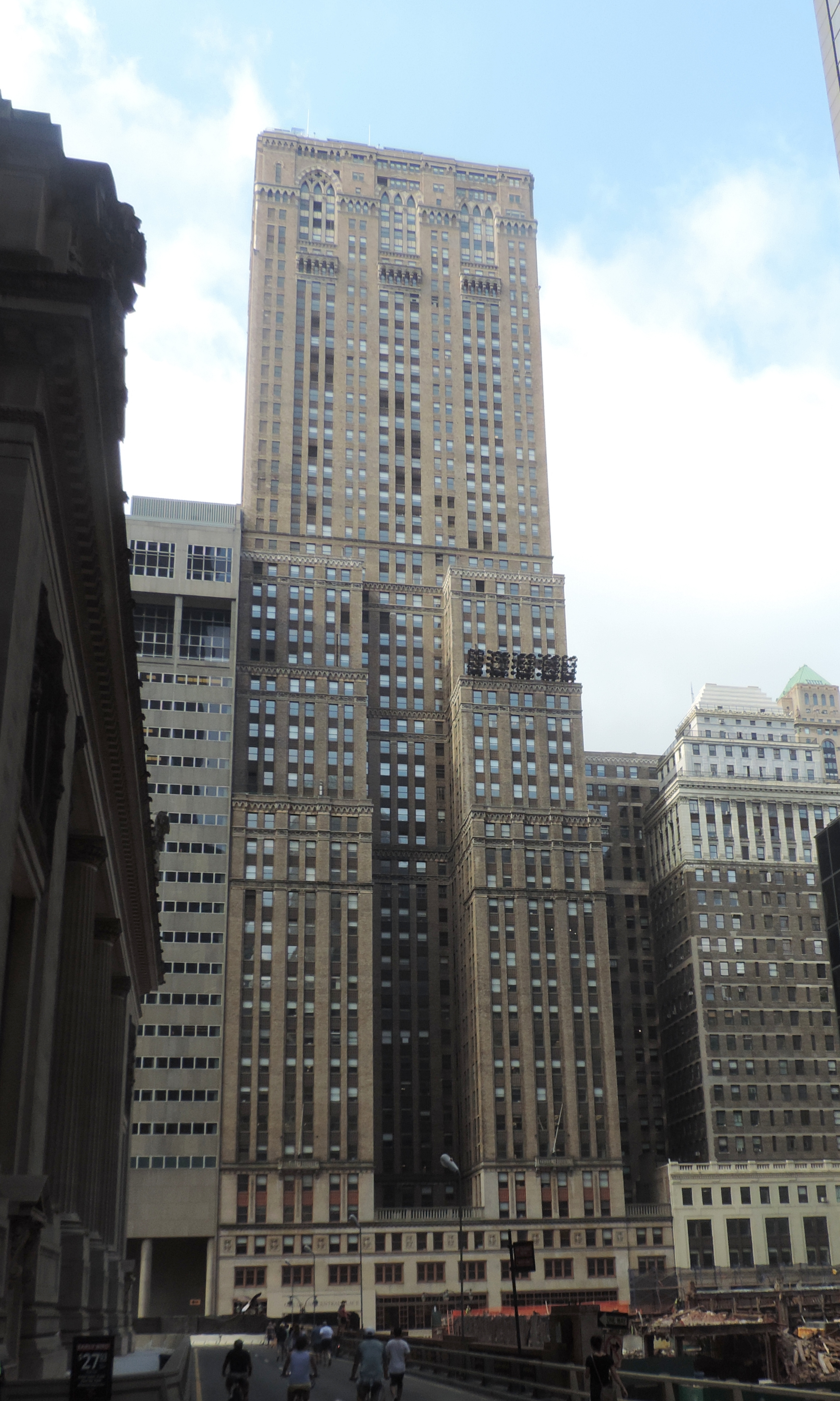
- Looking south from Park Avenue Viaduct beside Grand Central Terminal
- Interactive map of the One Grand Central Place area
- Former names: Lincoln Building

General information
- Status: Completed
- Type: Office
- Architectural style: Neo-Gothic
- Location: 60 East 42nd Street 10165; Manhattan, New York City, New York, U.S.
- Coordinates: 40°45′08″N 73°58′44″W
- Completed: 1930
- Opened: 1930
- Owner: Empire State Realty Trust One Grand Central Place

Height
- Roof: 673 feet (205 m)

Technical details
- Material: Steel
- Floor count: 55
- Floor area: 1,252,063 sq ft (116,320 m^{2})
- Lifts/elevators: 27 passenger, 2 freight

Design and construction
- Architect: Kenneth Norton of J.E.R. Carpenter

One Grand Central Place, originally the Lincoln Building, is a 55-story, 673 feet (205 m) tall neo-Gothic office building at 60 East 42nd Street in Midtown Manhattan, New York City, United States. It is bounded by Madison Avenue to the west, East 41st Street to the south, and Park Avenue to the east. One Grand Central Place is near other skyscrapers such as the Chrysler Building, MetLife Building, and One Vanderbilt. It has direct in-building access to Grand Central Terminal to the north. As of 2021, it is the 91st-tallest building in the city, tied with the 277 Fifth Avenue, Barclay Tower, and One Court Square. The building is assigned its own ZIP Code, 10165; it was one of 41 buildings in Manhattan that had their own ZIP Codes as of 2019.

== Description and history ==
Designed by architect Kenneth Norton of James Edwin Ruthven Carpenter Jr., the skyscraper was completed in 1930 as the Lincoln Building. Among the building's features are the Gothic windows at the top. In June 2009, the Lincoln Building was renamed One Grand Central Place, and it underwent a $85 million renovation, which included new windows, renovated elevators, renovated air-conditioned public corridors and restrooms, and upgraded building-wide systems.

In March 2020, One Grand Central Place had New York's first reported person-to-person spread of SARS-CoV-2 during the COVID-19 pandemic.

== Abraham Lincoln sculpture ==
In 1956, Lawrence Wien paid his daughter, Margaret French Cresson, $3,000 to acquire Daniel Chester French's 3-foot (0.91 m) bronze model of Abraham Lincoln, a cast of one of the sketches used to create the statue for the Lincoln Memorial. Wien put the sculpture on display in the visitor center in the lobby the same year. When the building was renamed One Grand Central Place in 2009, the model was removed and loaned to Chesterwood estate in Stockbridge, Massachusetts. It was returned to the lobby on April 15, 2015.

== See also ==
- Architecture of New York City
- List of tallest buildings in New York City
