= The Mark Hotel =

Luxury hotel in Manhattan, New York

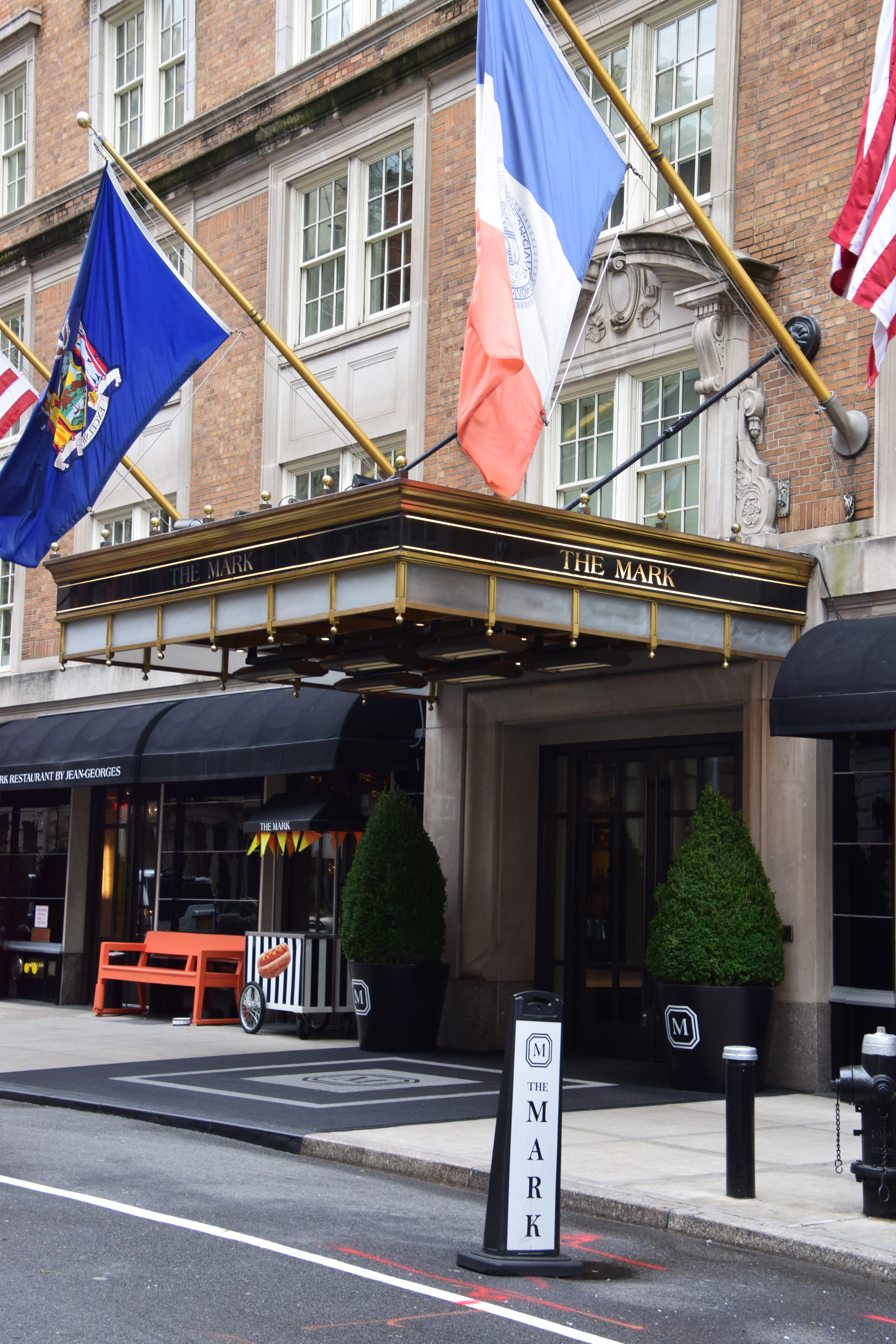
- View from outside The Mark Hotel

General information
- Status: Completed
- Type: Hotel
- Architectural style: Renaissance Revival
- Location: 25 East 77th Street at Madison Avenue, Manhattan, 10075, New York City, New York, United States
- Coordinates: 40°46′30.88″N 73°57′48.37″W
- Opened: 1927; 99 years ago
- Renovated: 2009
- Owner: Alexico Group

Height
- Height: 177.21 feet (54.01 m)

Technical details
- Floor count: 16

Design and construction
- Architect: Spivak Architects

Renovating team
- Architect: Spivak Architects
- Other designers: Jacques Grange (Interior design)

Other information
- Number of rooms: 106
- Number of suites: 47
- Number of restaurants: 2 (The Mark Restaurant by Jean-Georges and Caviar Kaspia at The Mark)
- Number of bars: 1 (The Mark Bar)
- Facilities: Technogym Fitness
- Public transit: 77th Street

Website
- www.themarkhotel.com

The Mark Hotel is a luxury hotel, situated at 25 East 77th Street, at Madison Avenue, on the Upper East Side of Manhattan, New York City. It was designed by architects Schwartz & Gross in the Renaissance Revival style and was built in 1927.

The building consists of 16 floors and is located near Central Park and several cultural institutions, including the Metropolitan Museum of Art.

== History ==
The hotel opened for business in September 1927 as the Hyde Park Hotel, an apartment hotel. In 1966, it was purchased by the real estate investment partnership of Sol Goldman and Alex DiLorenzo. In 1984, the hotel was purchased by a group of investors led by E. William Judson, at which time it was renovated and renamed the Madison Avenue Hotel. In 1988, it was converted into a luxury hotel under the management of the Rafael Group, and the name was changed to The Mark; further renovations ensued in 1990. In 2000, the Mandarin Oriental Hotel Group acquired the Rafael Group and rebranded the hotel as a Mandarin property. The building was purchased from Mandarin Oriental by Izak Senbahar of Alexico Group and Simon Elias in 2006, and the building's interiors were reimagined by French designer Jacques Grange in 2009.

In 2026, Alexico Group obtained $345 million in financing for the property from Deutsche Bank and JPMorgan Chase.

== Description ==
Housing 106 hotel rooms and 47 suites, the building features a Jean Georges Vongerichten restaurant and bar, a Frédéric Fekkai salon, John Lobb shoe care services, and a scent by Frédéric Malle and illustrations by Jean-Philippe Delhomme. The hotel's interior design incorporates custom furnishings and artworks commissioned for the property. Jacques Grange commissioned artists and artisans, including Karl Lagerfeld, Ron Arad, Eric Schmitt, Mattia Bonetti, Vladimir Kagan, Piero Lissoni and Rachel Howard to create furnishings and artwork for The Mark collection.

== Popular culture ==
Vogue dubbed The Mark 'The Starriest Hotel Lobby in the World' and 'Perhaps the Most Famous Lobby in the World'. The Mark has been included in numerous television series including Succession and Just Like That... and was featured in the inaugural episode of The World’s Most Luxurious Holidays on Channel 4.

== Awards and recognitions ==
The Mark Hotel has received the following awards and recognitions.

- 2026 Travel and Tour World (TTW) #9 – Top 100 Luxury Hotels in the World.
- 2026 Condé Nast Traveler Triple Crown Award.
- 2026 Tatler Travel Awards Best City Hotel in The World.
- 2025 The World's 50 Best Hotels.
- 2023 Condé Nast Traveler's 2023 Gold List.
