= Costas Kondylis =

American architect

- Born: Constantine Andreas Kondylis; April 17, 1940; Usumbura, Burundi
- Died: August 17, 2018 (aged 78); Manhattan, New York City, U.S.
- Education: University of Geneva; Columbia University
- Occupation: Architect
- Spouses: Gretchen Barnes (m. 1969, divorced) Lori Lotte Neuner (m. 1979; died 1995)
- Children: 2
- Awards: Service Award (ORT, 1995); Lifetime Achievement Award for Design Excellence (New York Society of Architects, 1997); Leader of Industry Award (Concrete Industry Board, 1997)
- Practice: Davis, Brody & Associates (1967–1979); Philip Birnbaum & Associates (1979–1989); Costas Kondylis & Associates (1989–2001); Costas Kondylis & Partners (2001–2009); Kondylis Design (2009–2018)
- Buildings: Trump World Tower

Costas Kondylis (April 17, 1940 – August 17, 2018) was an Greek-American architect. He designed over 85 buildings in New York City, through his eponymous architectural firm.

== Biography ==
Kondylis was born on April 17, 1940 in Bujumbura, the capital of Burundi, where his parents, Vassiliki and Andreas Constantine Kondylis, had migrated from Samos in Greece, with his father initially opening a chain of general stores across East Africa. Kondylis completed his secondary education at the model Anavrita Experimental Lyceum in Athens, Greece, continuing his studies in architecture at the University of Geneva in Switzerland, followed by a master's degree in urban design at Columbia University (1969, US). Kondylis worked at Davis, Brody & Associates, and then at Philip Birnbaum & Associates. In 1989, Kondylis created Costas Kondylis Architects; the firm's work has been featured in several magazines and was the subject of a television documentary. The company was renamed Costas Kondylis and Partners LLP in 2000, when several of the firm's architects became partners in the organization including Alan Goldstein, L. Stephen Hill, Marta Rudzka, and David West. The company, which was headquartered in New York City, dissolved in 2009. Afterward, he created another firm called Kondylis Design. Kondylis died on August 17, 2018, of complications of Parkinson's disease.

== Works ==
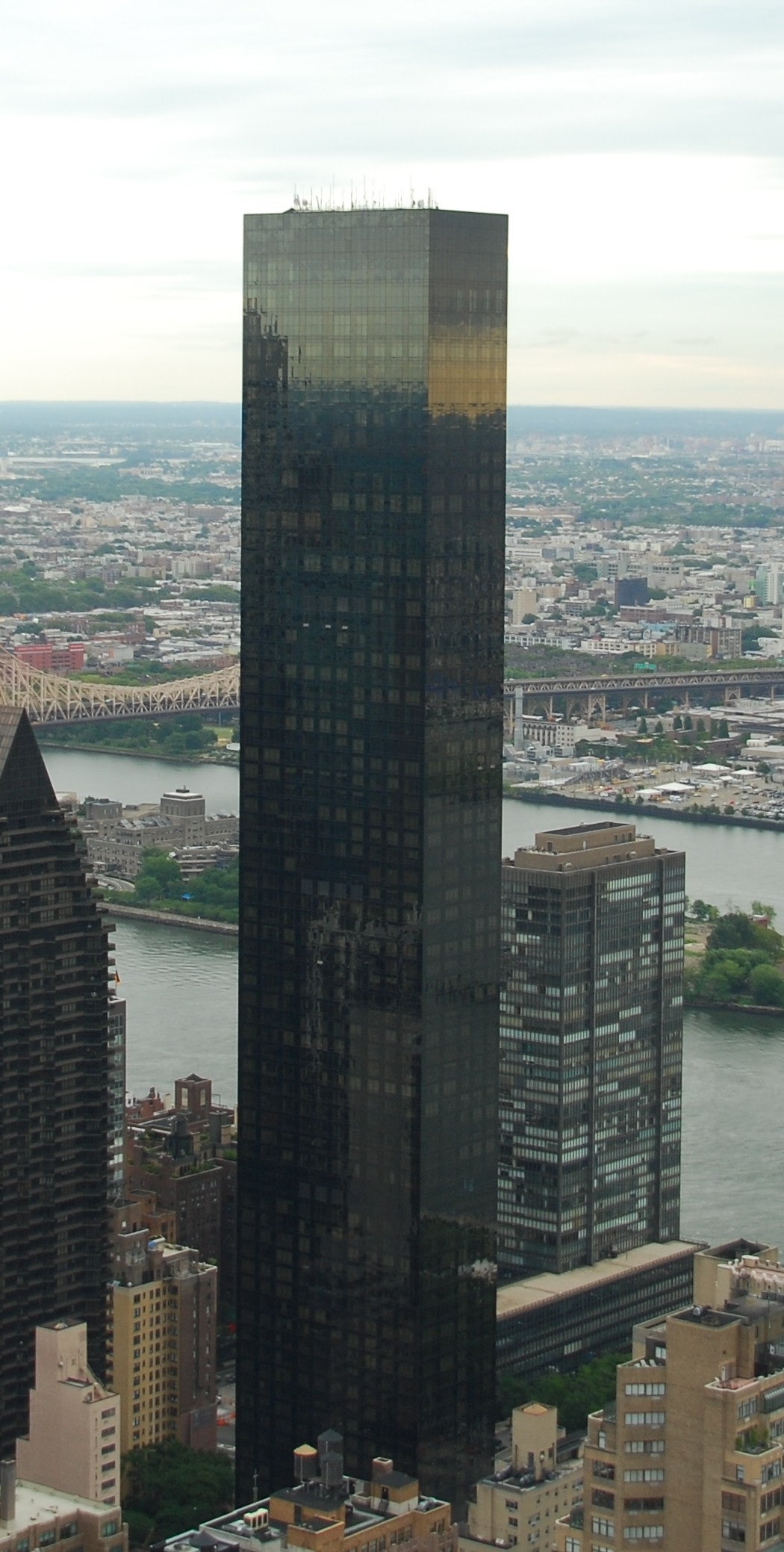
Trump World Tower

Kondylis was known for his conventional designs of skyscrapers in Manhattan, at a time when developers were either building low-rises or unconventional high-rises. He created 86 residential towers in Manhattan over the course of his career. From 2000 to 2007, it was estimated that he designed one residential building in Manhattan every six weeks on average. A 2007 New York Times profile noted that Kondylis had designed 75 projects in New York City and was designing 15 more at the time.

Some of Kondylis' projects were controversial. The 90-story Trump World Tower in Turtle Bay, Manhattan, New York City, was opposed by nearby residents and the United Nations, whose headquarters were located nearby. However, the tower was built without further controversy.

=== New York metropolitan area projects ===
Kondylis' projects in the New York metropolitan area include:

- Manhattan Place (1984)
- Trump Plaza (1984)
- 279 Central Park West (1988)
- 1049 Fifth Avenue (1992)
- The Strathmore (1997)
- Trump International Hotel and Tower (1998)
- Riverside South (1999–2004)
- Trump World Tower (2001)
- The Caroline (2002)
- The Beekman Regent (2002)
- The Anthem (2003)
- The Grand Tier (Glenwood Management, 2004)
- Trump Park Avenue (2004)
- Trump Tower at City Center (2005)
- Barclay Tower (2007)
- Columbus Square (2008)
- Trump Parc Stamford (2008)
- The Continental (2008)
- Silver Towers (2009)
- One Riverview (2019)

== See also ==
- Architecture of New York City
- List of architecture firms
