= Barclay Tower =

Residential skyscraper in Manhattan, New York

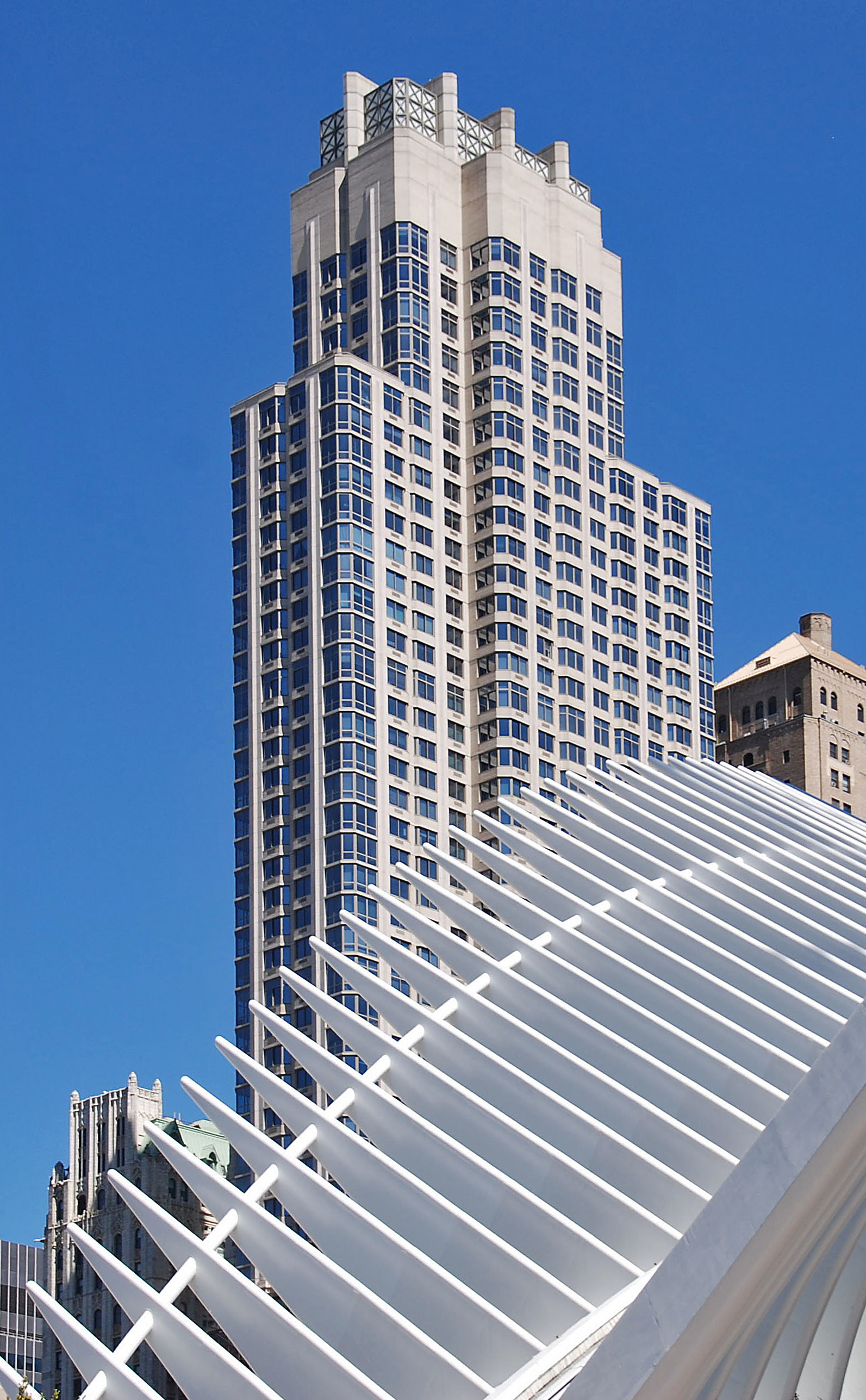
- Interactive map of the Barclay Tower area

General information
- Status: Completed
- Type: Residential
- Architectural style: Modernism
- Location: 10 Barclay Street; New York City
- Coordinates: 40°42′43.9″N 74°00′32.7″W
- Construction started: 2005
- Opening: 2007

Height
- Antenna spire: 673 feet (205 m)
- Roof: 584 feet (178 m)

Technical details
- Floor count: 56
- Floor area: 564,976 square feet (52,488 m^{2})

Design and construction
- Architect: Costas Kondylis & Partners

The Barclay Tower is a skyscraper located in the Tribeca neighborhood of Lower Manhattan, New York City. The residential building rises 673 feet (205 m) above street level, containing 56 floors and 441 rental units. It is tied with One Grand Central Place as the 81st tallest building in New York. The building was erected from 2005 to 2007 and had a topping out ceremony in late 2006.

The land that the building is standing on was formerly occupied by numerous five-story business buildings, including the Pearl Desk Company structure at 10 Barclay Street.

== See also ==
- List of tallest buildings in New York City
