= Columbus Square (New York City) =

Five buildings in Manhattan, New York City

Coordinates: 40°47′42.47″N 73°58′4.36″W

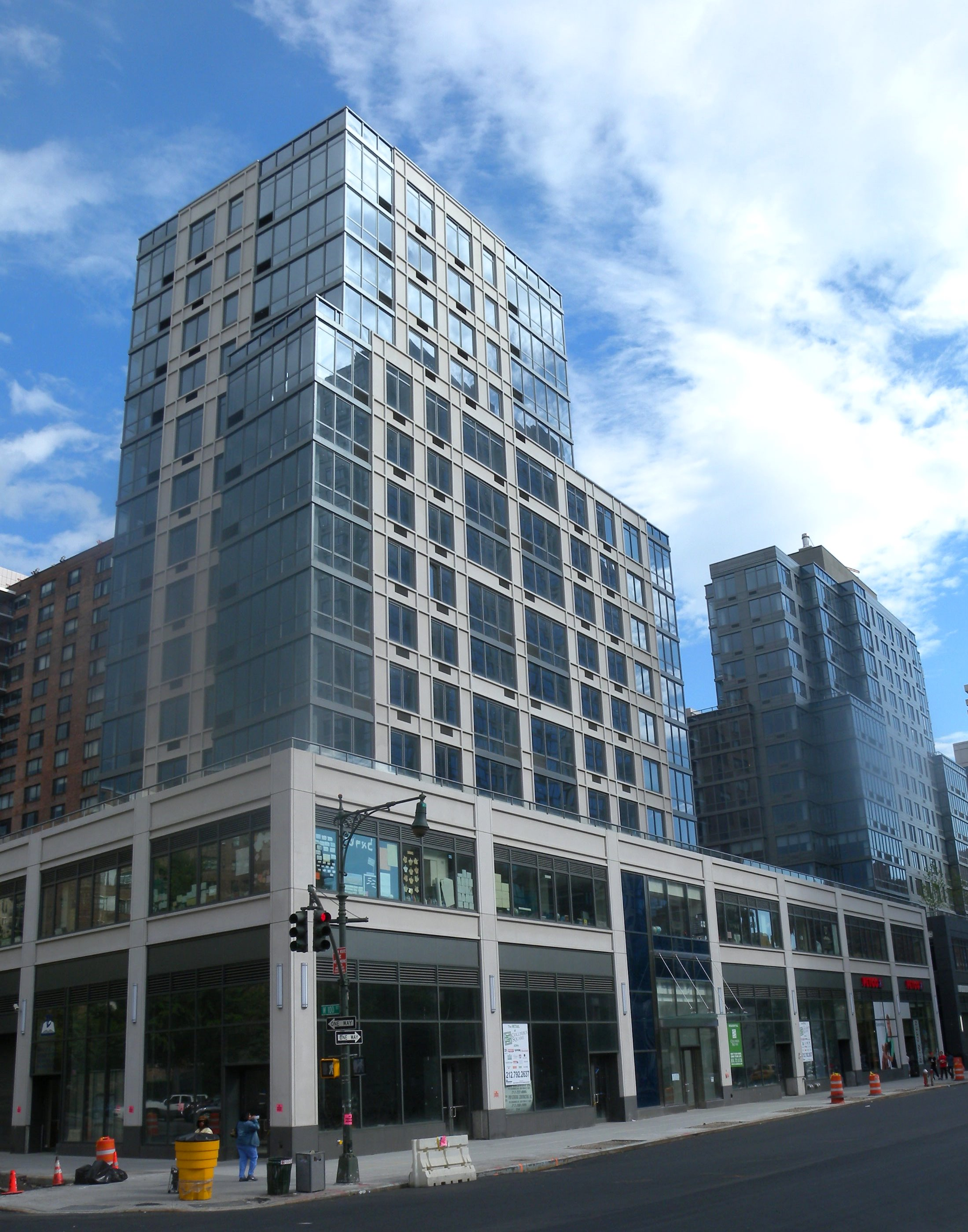
805 Columbus Avenue

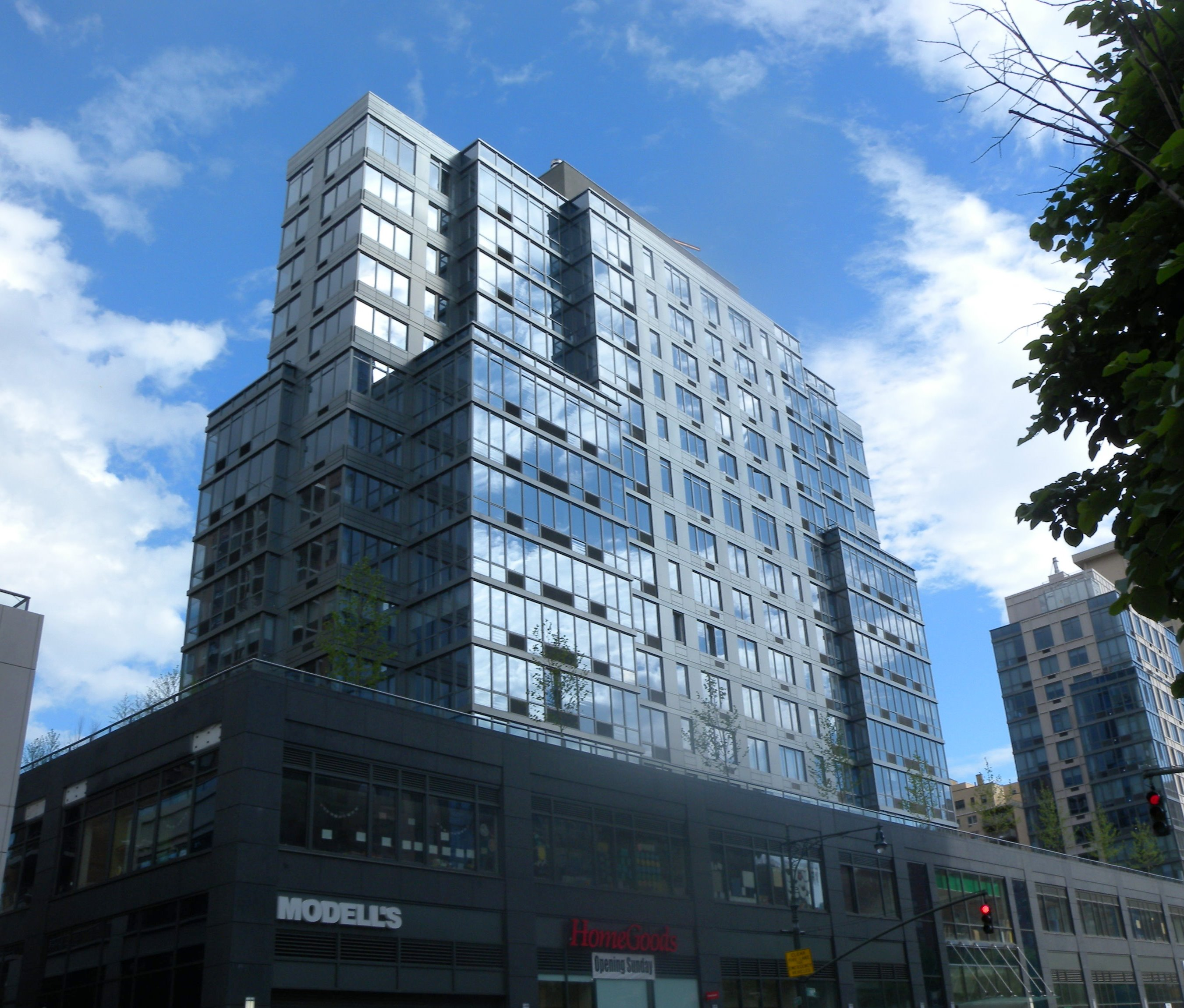
795 Columbus Avenue

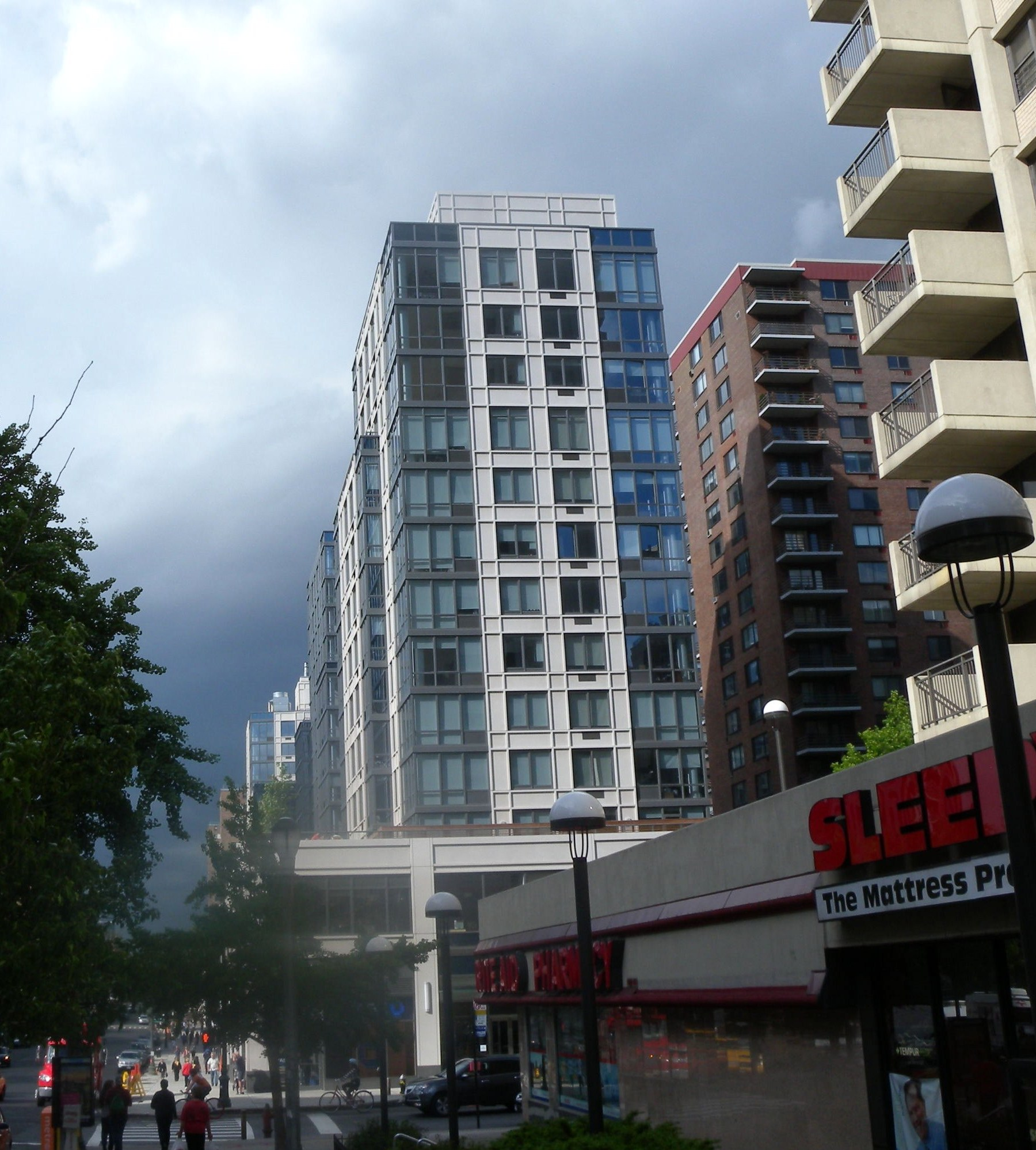
775 Columbus Avenue

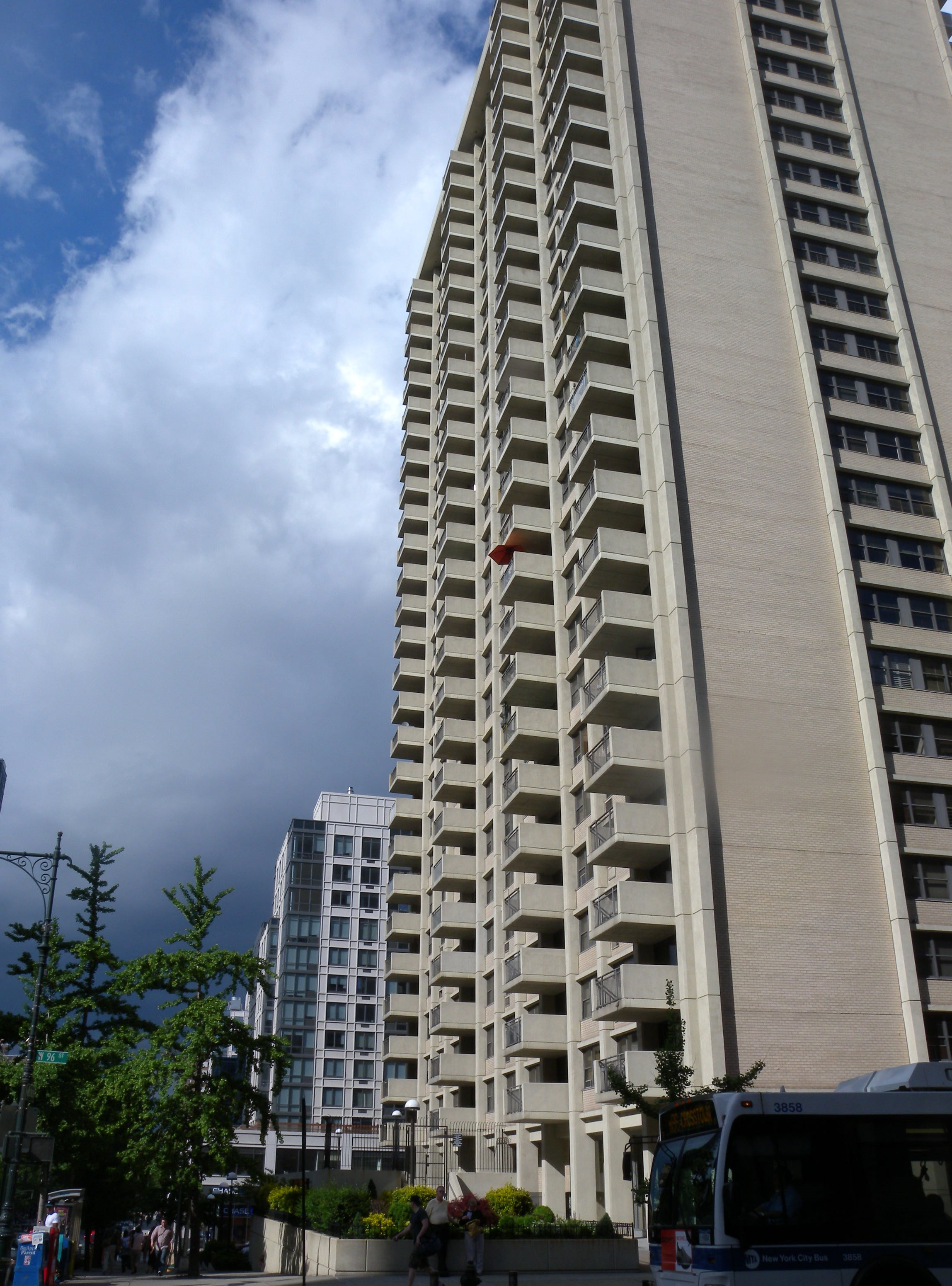
65 West 96th Street

Columbus Square consists of five luxury rental buildings located on the Upper West Side of Manhattan, in New York City. The real estate development runs from 97th Street to 100th Street between Columbus Avenue and Amsterdam Avenue, with over 300,000 square feet (28,000 m^{2}) of retail space. Initially known as Columbus Village, the five buildings include: 808 Columbus Avenue on the west side of Columbus Avenue between 97th and 100th Streets; 775 Columbus Avenue at the northeast corner of 97th Street and Columbus Avenue; 795 Columbus Avenue on the east side of Columbus Avenue between 98th and 99th Streets, 805 Columbus Avenue on the southeast corner of 100th Street and Columbus Avenue, and 801 Amsterdam Avenue on the southeast corner of 100th Street and Amsterdam Avenue. In 2009, according to the New York Daily News, Columbus Square was the largest residential development currently being built in Manhattan.

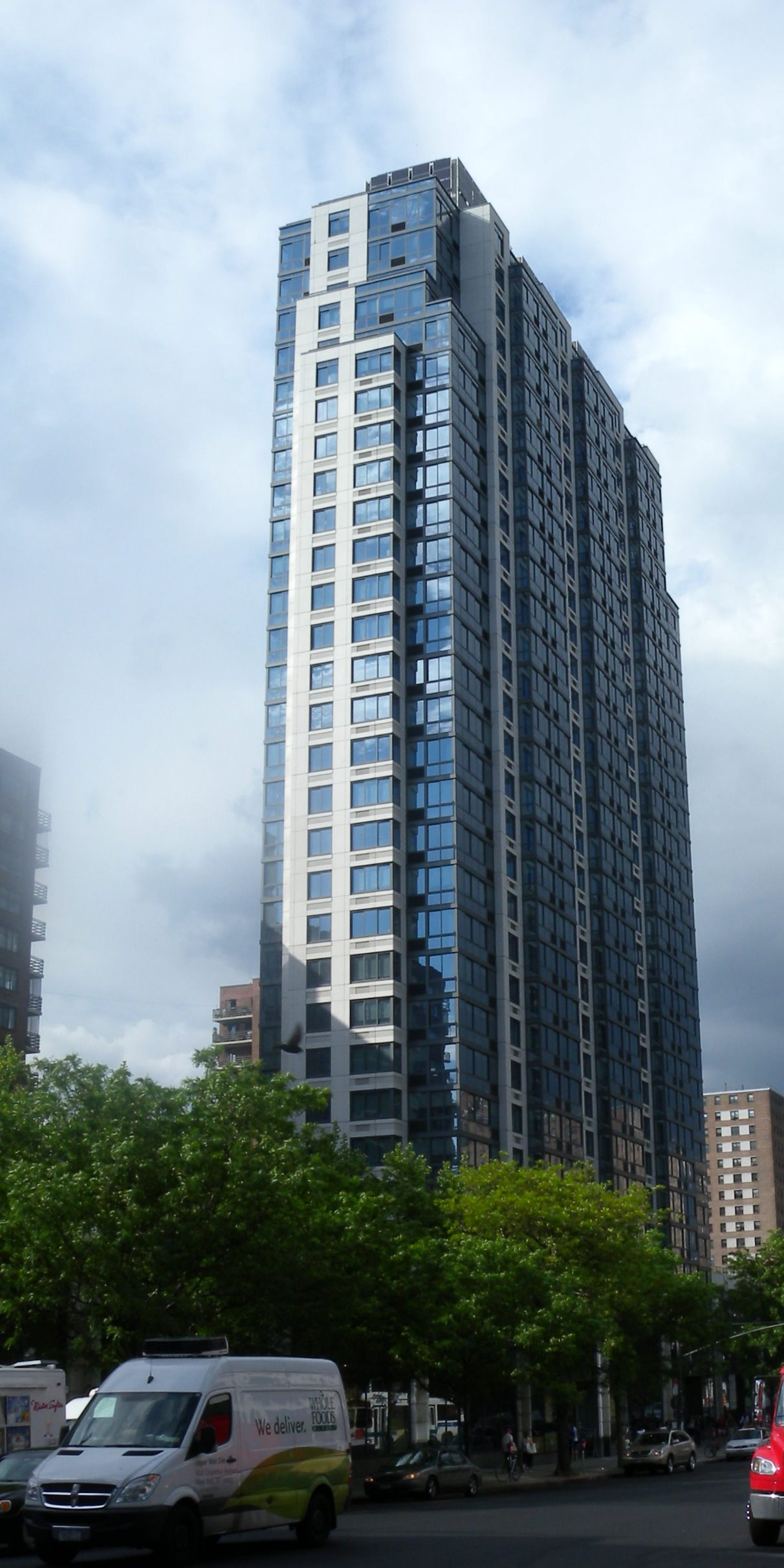
808 Columbus Avenue

== Retail space ==
The retail space is being leased by Winnick Realty. The 60,000-square-foot (5,600 m^{2}) Whole Foods Market, which anchors the 808 Columbus Avenue building, opened in August 2009. TJ Maxx, Michael's, Sephora, and Modell's have also opened, and Petco have confirmed their lease. Other rumored tenants include Crumbs Bakery, Associated Supermarket, Chase Bank, and Borders Books. A community health center, the Ryan Center, will have space in the complex as will the Mandell School and the Solomon Schechter School of Manhattan.

== Structural design ==
The 808 tower on Columbus Avenue was designed by Costas Kondylis and Partners, LLP. Design features include valet parking, a lobby, a residents’ lounge with a fireplace, a catering kitchen, a fitness center, a children's playroom, a bicycle storage room and a media center. Interior designs were by Andrés Escobar, featuring floor-to-ceiling windows, soundproof oak floors, washer-dryers, stainless-steel appliances and CaesarStone countertop.

In May 2009, the 29-story tower located on 808 Columbus Avenue became available with 359 residential units. The remaining buildings were scheduled to be completed by October 2010.
