= Impresa Pizzarotti =

Italian construction and civil engineering company

Impresa Pizzarotti & C. S.p.A.
- Type: Private (S.p.A.)
- Founded: 1910
- Founder: Gino Pizzarotti
- Headquarters: Parma, Italy
- Key people: Paolo Pizzarotti (chairman); Riccardo Garrè (CEO)
- Revenue: €1,031.6 million (2024)
- Net income: −€10.7 million (2024)
- Parent: Mipien S.p.A. (about 97%)
- Website: www.pizzarotti.it

Impresa Pizzarotti & C. S.p.A. is an Italian construction and civil engineering company headquartered in Parma.

== History ==
Impresa Pizzarotti was founded in 1910 as a sole proprietorship by Gino Pizzarotti. In 1945 it became a limited liability company and in 1961 a joint-stock company. According to the company, it won its first contracts outside Italy between 1960 and 2000, and entered the prefabricated construction sector in the same period.

The company says that its work has included thermal and nuclear power stations, roads and motorways, civil and military airports, hydraulic works, dams, railways and prisons, and that it took part in the reconstruction after the 1980 Irpinia earthquake.

Between 2016 and 2020 the company reduced its involvement in concession projects in order to finance new initiatives.

In October 2023 Riccardo Garrè was appointed chief executive officer, with the stated aim of doubling turnover by 2027.

== Ownership ==
Impresa Pizzarotti is about 97% owned by Mipien S.p.A., a holding company belonging to the Pizzarotti family, which provides general services and manages a series of strategic holdings for the group. Paolo Pizzarotti is chairman of the board of directors.

== Operations ==
The company designs and builds large civil engineering works in Italy and abroad. It operates mainly as an engineering, procurement and construction (EPC) contractor, and is also active in concessions and project financing, prefabricated structures and real estate development. Its current business areas are infrastructure, precasting, buildings, facility management, real estate, and "smart and green" activities. The company lists among its major works Charles de Gaulle Airport, Eurodisney, the new Milan fair complex at Rho, the Children's Hospital in Parma and sections of the Autostrada del Sole.

In 2017, Engineering News-Record's Top 250 International Contractors ranked Impresa Pizzarotti 121st, up from 178th in 2016.

In early 2017 Enrica, Pietro and Michele Pizzarotti, children of Paolo Pizzarotti, established Fondazione Pizzarotti, a private non-profit foundation supporting disadvantaged children, social development, culture, the environment and education in Italy and abroad.

== Financial data ==
In 2021 the company's revenues were €1,098.6 million and it closed the year with a loss of €67.9 million. According to filings with the Italian company register, revenues were €880.6 million in 2022 (net loss €22.1 million), €872.8 million in 2023 (net loss €55.4 million) and €1,031.6 million in 2024 (net loss €10.7 million).

== See also ==
- List of Italian companies
- 161 Maiden Lane
