= Silver Towers =

Residential skyscrapers in Manhattan, New York

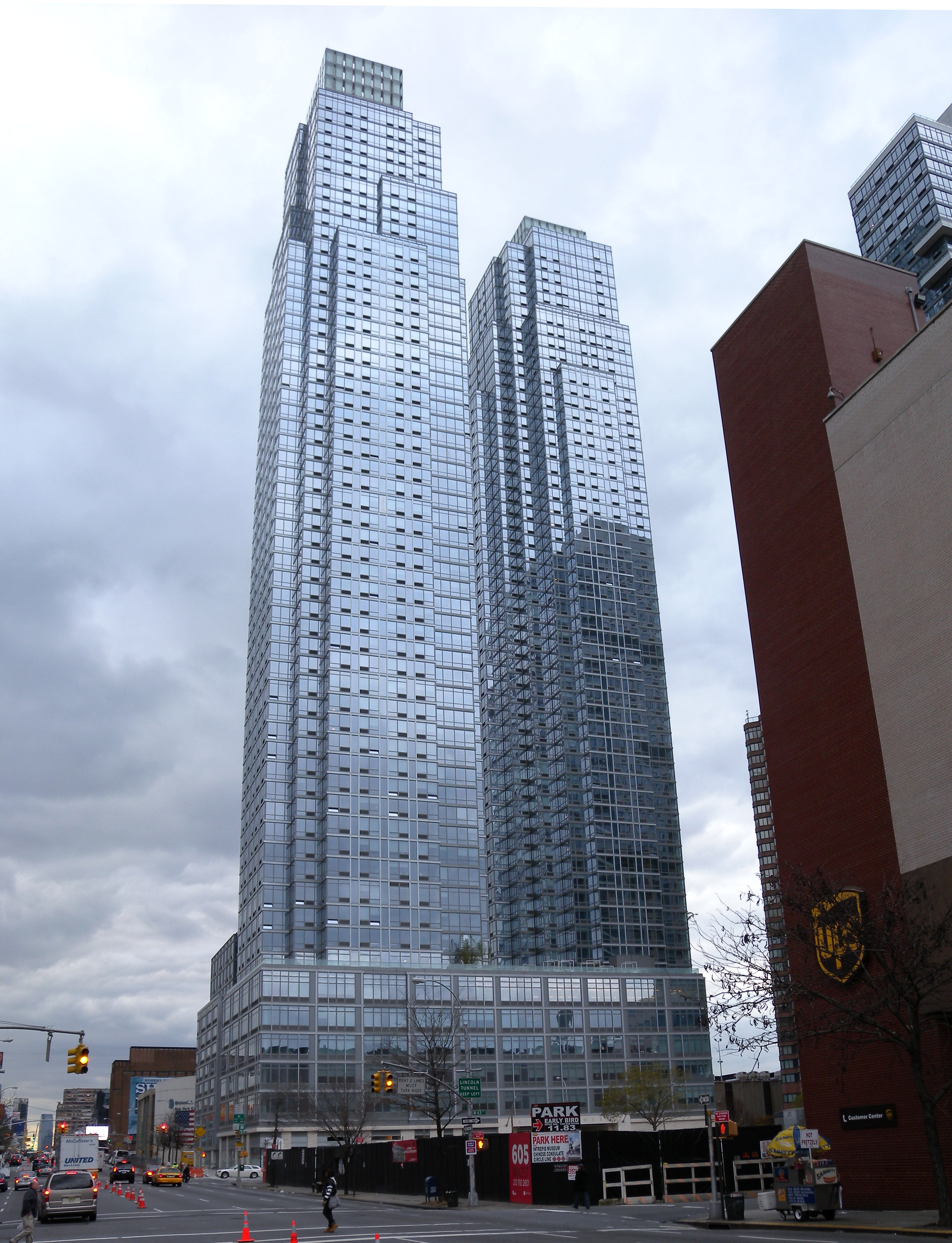
- From 44th Street

General information
- Status: Completed
- Type: Residential
- Location: 620 West 42nd Street
- Coordinates: 40°45′38.6″N 73°59′57.1″W
- Completed: 2009

Height
- Roof: 199 m (653 ft)

Technical details
- Floor count: 57

Design and construction
- Architect: Costas Kondylis
- Developer: Silverstein Properties

The Silver Towers are twin residential buildings in the Hell's Kitchen (formerly also known as Clinton) neighborhood of Manhattan, New York City. The 60-story buildings stand on the west side of Eleventh Avenue between 41st Street and 42nd Street near the Hudson River and contain 1,359 units. The project includes a 75-foot (23 m) pool, the largest in a New York City residential building, as well as a quarter-acre public park on the west side of the towers. The Silver Towers were completed in June 2009.

Larry Silverstein, who developed the buildings, bought the block between 42nd and 41st Streets between 11th and 12th Avenues in 1984 for $20 million. At the time, the site was vacant and zoned for single story industrial use. The block was rezoned in 1989, and One River Place, a 41-story residential high-rise, opened on the west end in 2000. In 2000, Silverstein contemplated developing an office building on the east end of the block. A few years later, the site was considered as the location for a 1,500-room hotel as part of the plans to expand the Jacob K. Javits Convention Center.

Costas Kondylis designed the Silver Towers and One River Place. The original design called for a single large residential building (Two River Place), like its neighbor on the west end of the block, but this was changed to two buildings to make the halls feel more intimate.

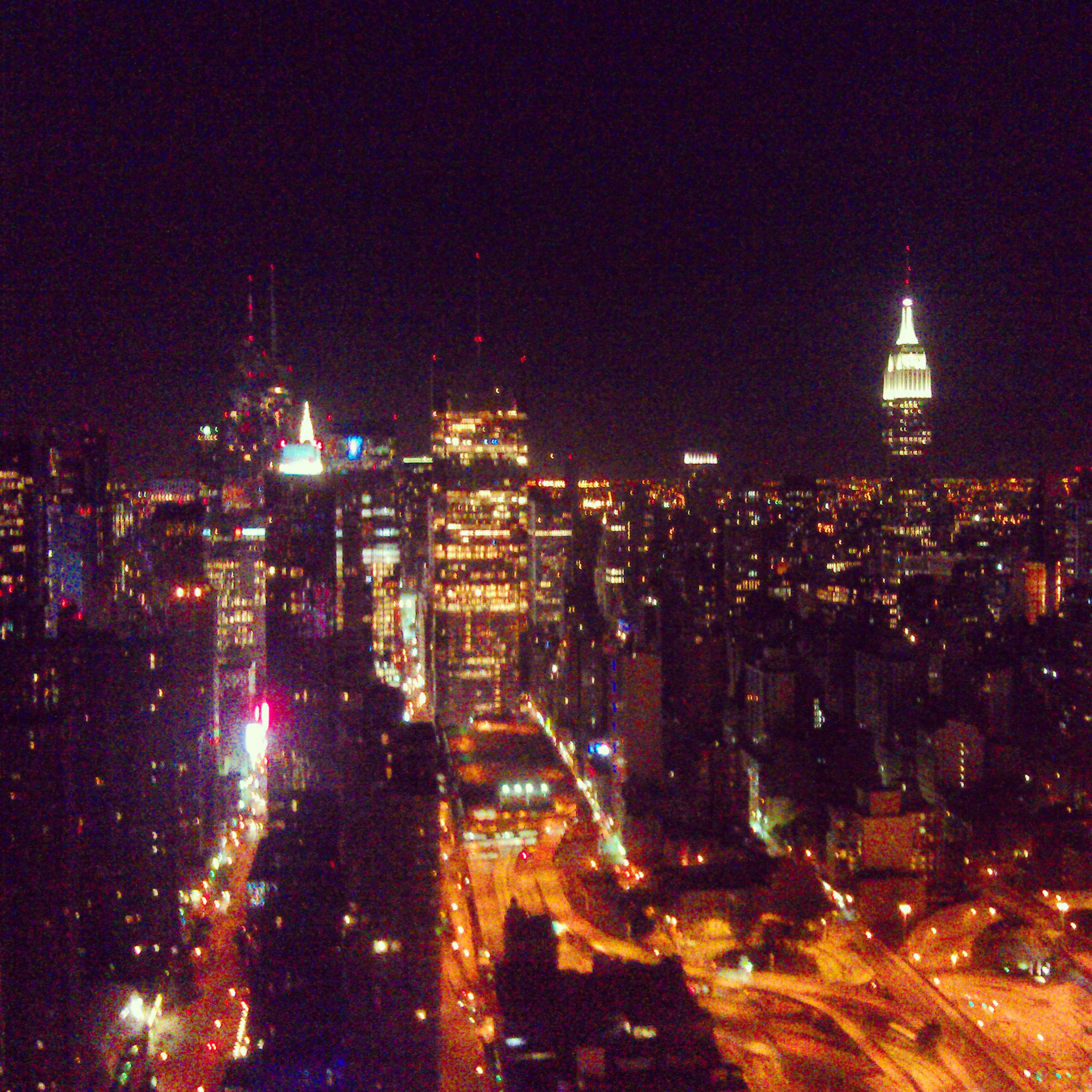
A View of Midtown Manhattan from Silver Towers

== See also ==
- List of tallest buildings in New York City
