= The Continental NYC =

Residential skyscraper in Manhattan, New York

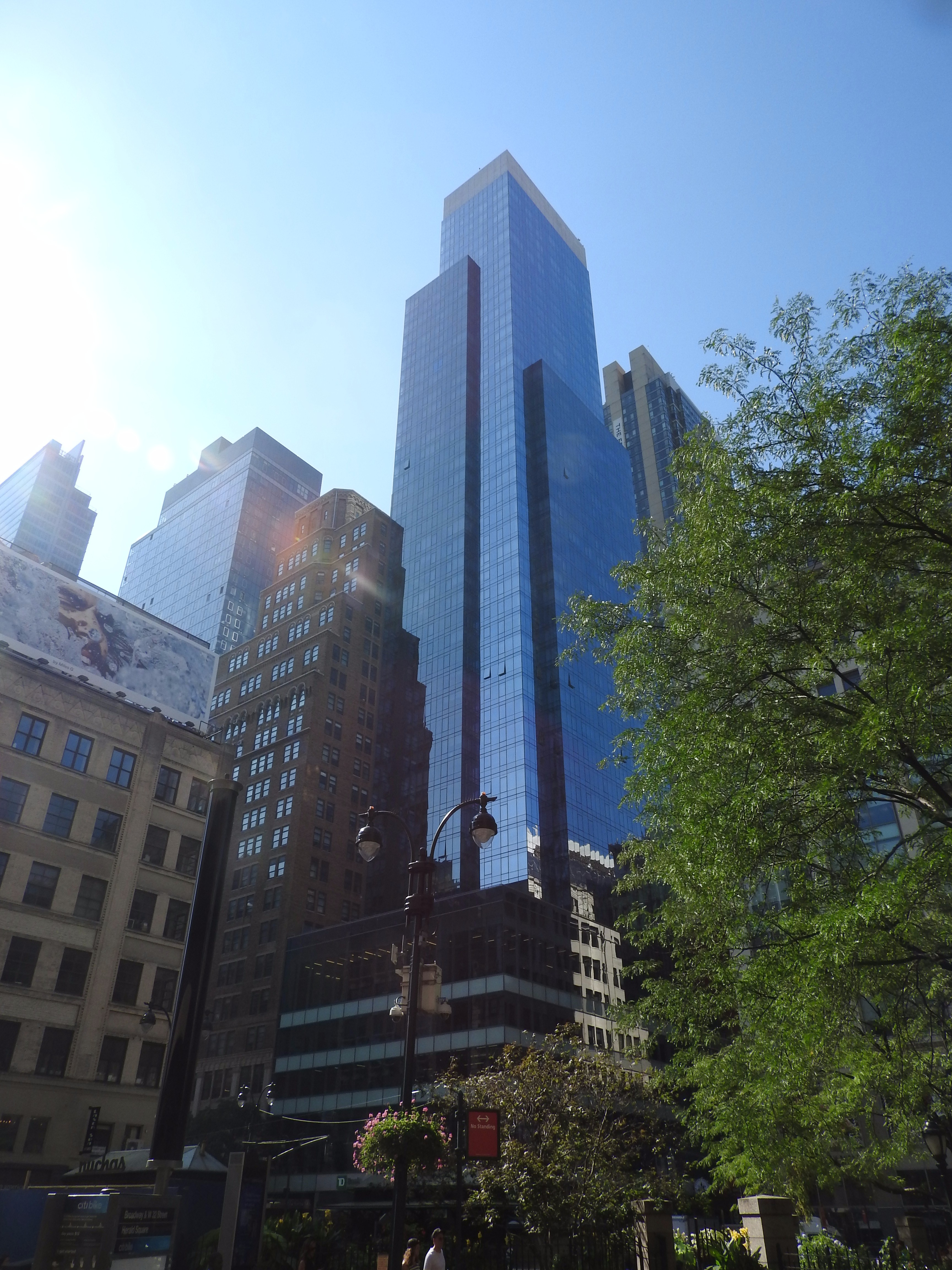
- Interactive map of the The Continental NYC area

General information
- Type: Residential
- Location: Manhattan, New York
- Coordinates: 40.7483°N 73.9890°W
- Construction started: 2010
- Completed: 2011

Height
- Top floor: 53

Technical details
- Floor count: 53

Design and construction
- Architect: Costas Kondylis

Website
- www.thecontinental.com

The Continental NYC, originally known as Tower 111, is a 53-story, 338-unit luxury rental apartment skyscraper designed by architect Costas Kondylis at 885 Sixth Avenue and 32nd Street in Midtown Manhattan, New York City, United States. Its exclusive representative is the Atlantic Development Group.
