= Frédéric Fekkai =

French hairstylist and businessman (born 1958)

Frédéric Fekkai (born 1958) is a French celebrity hairstylist and entrepreneur in the beauty industry.

== Early life ==
Fekkai was born and raised in Aix-en-Provence, France, to an Egyptian father and Vietnamese mother. In 1979 at the age of 21, Fekkai moved to New York City to start his career.

== Career ==
Fekkai moved to Paris in 1979 as a 21-year-old apprentice to the hairdresser Jacques Dessange. A quick learner, three years later he would move to New York to launch an American salon for Dessange.

By 1989, he opened his own salon in the city's Bergdorf Goodman Building. Famous for creating hairstyles for models on both catwalks and magazines, he opened salons in both New York City and Los Angeles and went on to launch his own line of hair-care products. Fekkai has styled the hair of many prominent women, including Kim Basinger, Jessica Lange, Sigourney Weaver, Claudia Schiffer, Debra Messing, Renée Zellweger, and Hillary Clinton. He is often regarded as a celebrity hair stylist.

In 2015, Fekkai and his wife acquired Côté Bastide, a 25-year-old lifestyle brand from his hometown of Aix-en-Provence. The couple relaunched the business as Bastide, a collection of natural beauty and luxury home products. The name is inspired by the couple's own bastide (manor house) in Aix.

In 2025, the official price for a "Haircut with Frédéric Fekkai" at the Fekkai Salon within the Mark Hotel cost US$1,000.

== Personal life ==
Fekkai has been named in documents regarding Jeffrey Epstein, alleging that Epstein attempted to "look for girls" for him at a time he was in Hawaii, which was stated during a deposition that took place on May 18, 2016. In 2026 he was sued in the New York Supreme Court by seven women, who claim that Fekkai and one of his employees, Patrick Coombs, aided Epstein's sex trafficking operation for years, grooming Epstein's victims "to look as young as possible under Epstein's direction."
