= 508 West 24th Street =

Building in Manhattan, New York

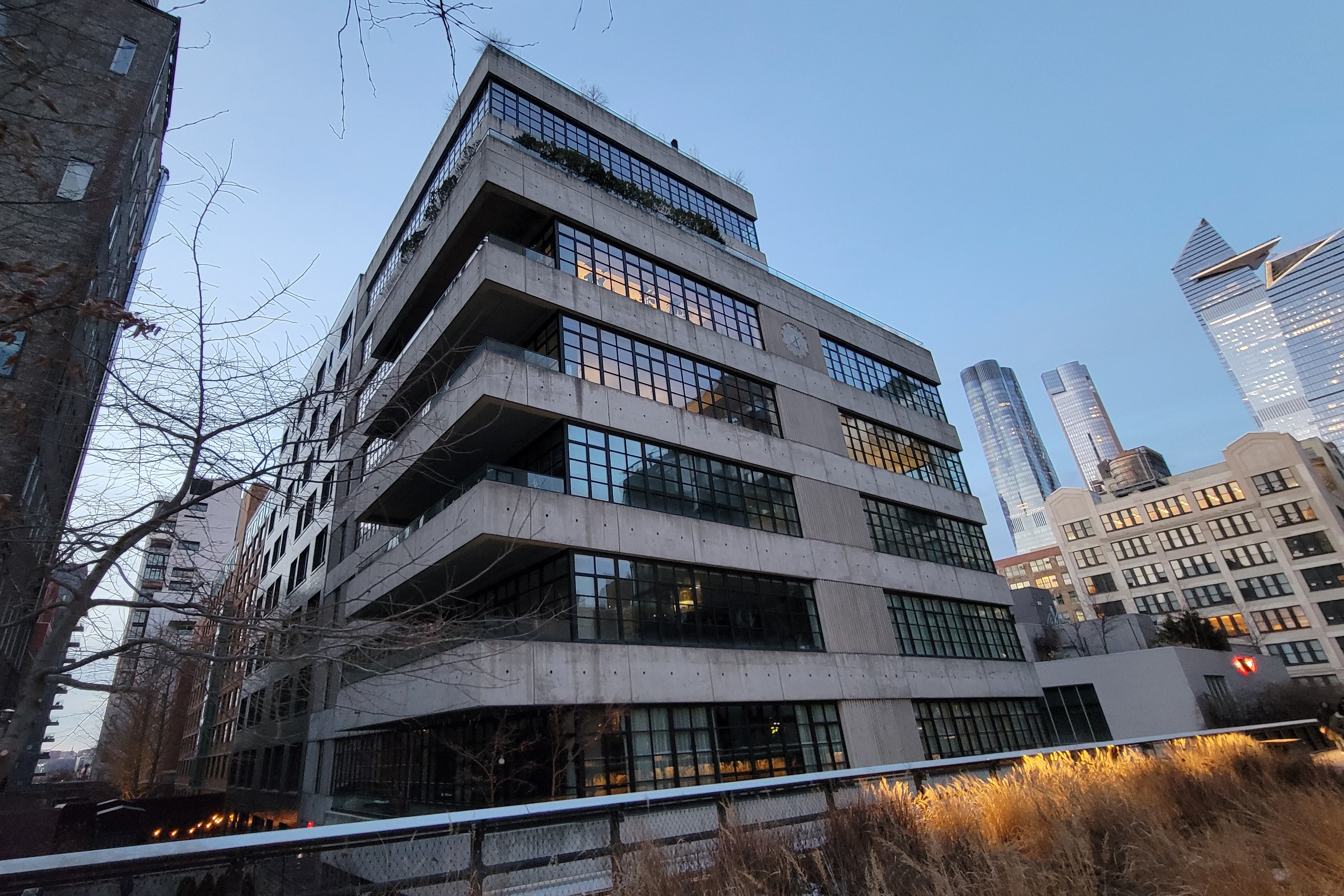
- Looking from the High Line.
- Interactive map of the 508 West 24th Street area
- Alternative names: 508W24

General information
- Status: Completed
- Type: Residential
- Architectural style: Bauhaus-inspired
- Location: Chelsea, Manhattan, New York
- Coordinates: 40°44′54.5″N 74°00′16.5″W

Design and construction
- Architect: Tamarkin Co.

508 West 24th Street (also known as 508W24) is a residential building in the Chelsea neighborhood of Manhattan in New York City, near the High Line. The building was designed by Cary Tamarkin.

== History and construction ==
The previous building on the site was purchased by Tamarkin in 2011. The foundations of the building were finished in June 2013, and by July of that year, the development was in level with the adjacent High Line park, and was placed on the market. During the building's construction, the facade of the building was darkened by grime, but was cleaned when the building was finished.

== Design ==
The building appears to draw inspiration from Bauhaus architecture, and incorporates a large clock onto its exterior, which faces the High Line. The clock is intended to contribute to the tradition of public art around the park.

== Usage and amenities ==
The building is entirely residential, with fifteen units. Fourteen of the fifteen units have three bedrooms, specifically catering to families interested in moving to the neighborhood. Amenities include a fitness room, a playroom, and a courtyard open to all tenants.

Carmelo Anthony is a resident of the building.
