= Glenwood Management =

Real estate company in New York City, U.S.

- Company type: Incorporated
- Industry: Rental apartment building, ownership, and management
- Founded: 1961; 64 years ago
- Founder: Leonard Litwin; Harry Litwin
- Headquarters: Manhattan, New York, U.S.
- Number of locations: 350 (2022)
- Area served: Manhattan, New York

Glenwood Management is a New York City private, multi-generational real estate developer, owner, and management company focusing on multifamily apartment rentals. The company was incorporated in 1961 by father and son, Harry and Leonard Litwin. Glenwood is known for luxury apartment rental buildings with an emphasis on amenities, service, and LEED standard green building. Glenwood's footprint spans the entirety of Manhattan from the Upper East Side to Downtown Tribeca.

== Company ==
Harry Litwin and his son Leonard began their careers in landscaping when they founded Woodbourne Cultural Nursery in Melville, Long Island. In the late 1950s, they ventured into building wood framed multifamily housing on Long Island and the outer boroughs of New York City. Their first large-scale project was in Briar Hill, Riverdale, NY. The property mixed suburban amenities with urban luxury living on a four-acre parcel, which included an Olympic-sized outdoor pool, snack bar, tennis courts, playground, and fitness center. In 1962, Glenwood expanded to Manhattan with the development of the Pavilion, a luxury rental building on the Upper East Side of Manhattan. Harry Litwin died during the Pavilion's construction, and Leonard took over management of the construction.

== The Pavilion ==
In 1962 Glenwood delivered its first property in Manhattan, The Pavilion. Comprising over 800 apartments, the Pavilion was so large it was given its own zip code. The project also earned Leonard Litwin a key to New York City, awarded to him by then-Mayor John Lindsay. The building was renowned for its size and pioneering amenities such as a grocery store, salon, shoe repair, a maid and butler service, and bus service to local shopping and the Lexington Avenue subway station.

Glenwood continued to expand along the York Avenue corridor of the Upper East Side with The Andover, The Brittany, The Barclay, The Caldwell, The Hamilton, The Somerset and The Stratford. Following the success of these buildings, the company expanded their developments into the West Side, Midtown, Lincoln Center area, and Downtown. A champion of New York City's real estate industry, Glenwood showed its belief in Manhattan as it was the first developer to build Downtown following 9/11 with 10 Liberty Street. This building, Liberty Plaza, was added to The National Registrar of Historic Places.

== Glenwood's model ==
Glenwood provides apartment rentals that cater to various lifestyles, from single young professionals to mature families, as well as those in their golden years. It was an early innovator in offering rental tenants the same upscale amenities usually reserved for high-end condo and co-op buildings. All Glenwood buildings feature high-end finishes such as marble bathrooms, filtered water systems, luxury counter tops, stainless steel appliances, auxiliary services such as laundry valet and garages, and amenities such as lap pools, fitness centers, yoga studios and children's playrooms.

== Social responsibility ==
The developers place emphasis on building green. Many of the company's latest buildings including Emerald Green, Crystal Green, Hawthorn Park and the Encore were built to meet LEED Certification Standards.

== Charity ==
Glenwood is recognized for its various charitable and community oriented actions, which typically support the surrounding community. Glenwood supports Asphalt Green, a nonprofit located on the Upper East Side of Manhattan, which provides neighborhood adults and children with high caliber swimming and sports instruction. Maggie Siegel, executive director of Asphalt Green said “without Glenwood's vision and dedication, our Yorkville neighborhood would not be the thriving community that it is today.” Glenwood has supported Asphalt Green since its founding in 1984, as it strove to provide the greater community with free programs and scholarships that benefit over 30,000 children annually. In 2015, Glenwood was honored at Asphalt Green's 20th annual charity swim meet “The Big Swim.” The event raises money to fund free programs like swim lessons for public school students.

Glenwood has planted more than 150,000 tulip bulbs each year in the neighborhoods that its buildings are in and donates to the Central Park Conservancy, Lincoln center, the Met, PS 158 Bayard Taylor School, and several hospitals including NYU, Mt Sinai, Weill Cornell, Lenox Hill, Sloan Kettering Memorial, and North Shore/ LIJ.
