= One Seaport Plaza =

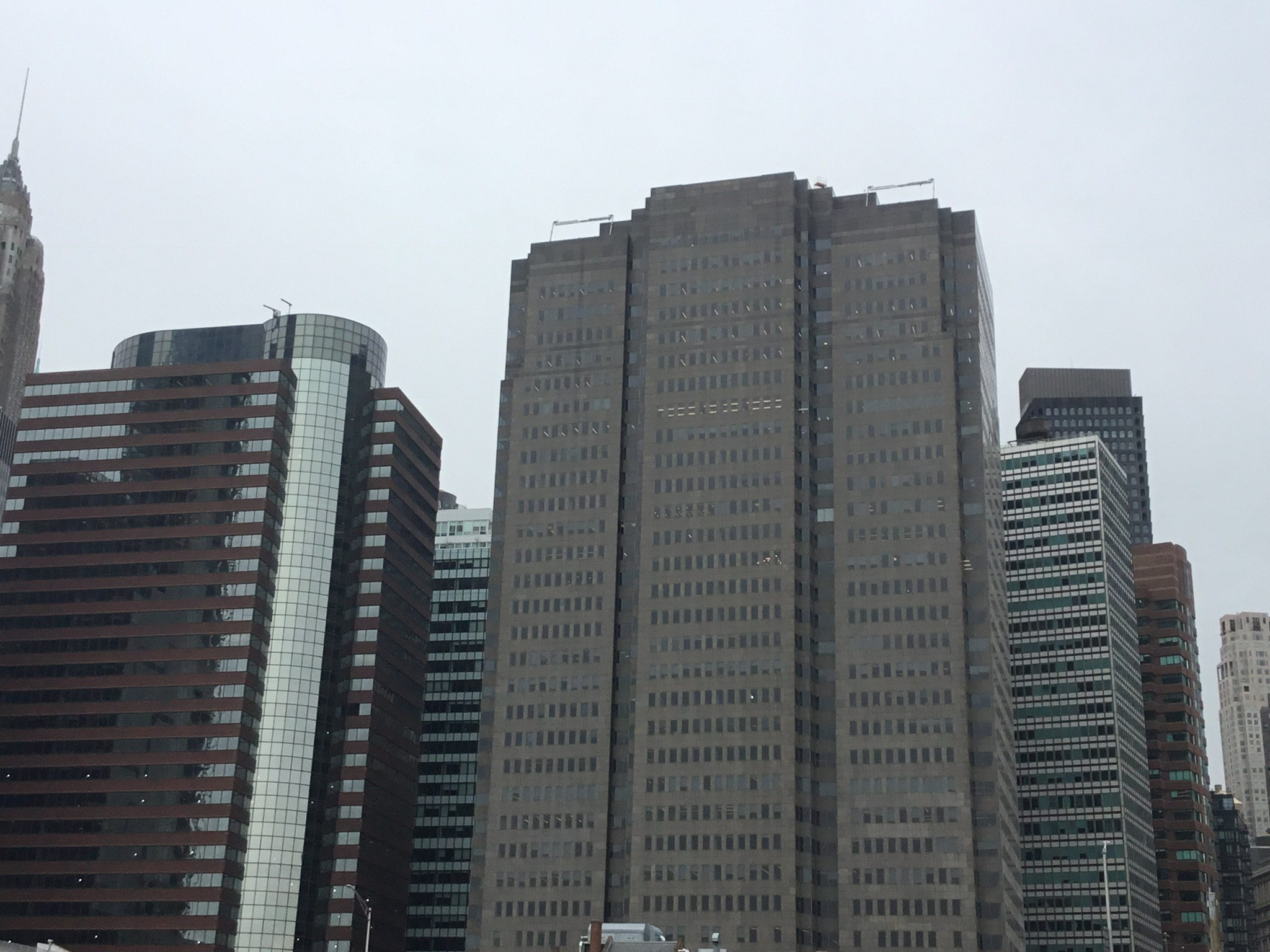
- Interactive map of the One Seaport Plaza area

General information
- Type: Office
- Location: New York City, New York, United States
- Coordinates: 40°42′25″N 74°0′16″W
- Construction started: 1982
- Completed: 1984
- Owner: Jack Resnick & Sons

Height
- Height: 440 ft (134 m)

Technical details
- Floor count: 35
- Floor area: 1,100,000 sq ft (100,000 m^{2})

Design and construction
- Architecture firm: Swanke Hayden Connell Architects

One Seaport Plaza (also known as 199 Water Street) is an office building in the Financial District of Manhattan in New York City, located at Water Street near South Street Seaport. The building, standing at 440 feet (134 m) with 35 floors, is an important office building in Lower Manhattan. The building was designed by Swanke Hayden Connell Architects architecture firm.

Construction took place from 1982 to 1984. The building is to the north of 161 Water Street.

The building received the Leed certification in 2012, 2017 and 2023.

== Tenants ==
- Allied World Insurance
- Cantor Fitzgerald
- Euro Brokers Inc
- Howard Hughes Corporation
- Stripe
- Accounting and Compliance International
